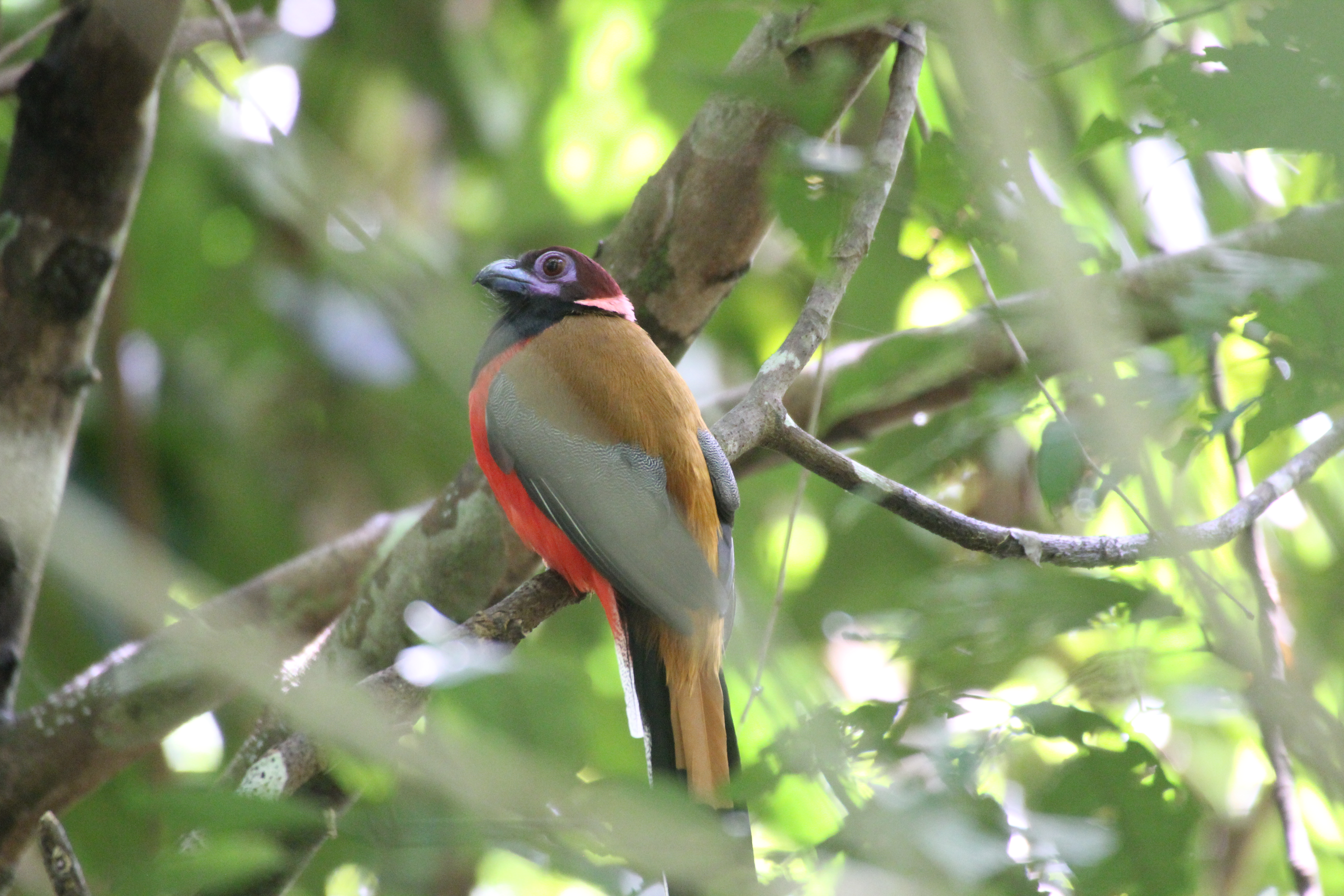

Conservation status
- Near Threatened (IUCN 3.1)

Scientific classification
- Kingdom: Animalia
- Phylum: Chordata
- Class: Aves
- Order: Trogoniformes
- Family: Trogonidae
- Genus: Harpactes
- Species: H. diardii

Binomial name
- Harpactes diardii (Temminck, 1832)

= Diard's trogon =

Species of bird

Diard's trogon (Harpactes diardii) is a species of bird in the family Trogonidae. It is found in Brunei, Indonesia, Malaysia, Singapore, and Thailand. Its natural habitat is subtropical or tropical moist lowland forests. It is threatened by habitat loss.

Apalodermatinae is the African subfamily consisting of one genus, Apaloderma. The Asian subfamily is Harpactinae and contains two genera, Harpactes and Apalharpactes.

Males are black headed and breasted with a pink breast line. Females are brown headed and breasted with pink under parts. Diard's trogon eats caterpillars, beetles, stick-insects, locustids and other Orthoptera, and fruits. The breeding times of Diard's trogon range from February to August: February to mid-May in Malaysia, Mid-May to August in Borneo.

The Dayak Iban community believes that hearing the Diard's trogon's call is a bad omen.

== Taxonomy ==
The trogons are birds with colorful plumage that belong to the order Trogoniformes which only comprises one family, the Trogonidae. The genus Harpactes, which is one of the seven genera contained in this family, are all residents of South and Southeast Asia. Two biogeographical hypotheses propose different origins of trogons, one being they originated from Gondwana, and the other Laurasia. Although a paper from 1998 originally supported the Gondwanan origin of Trogons, more recent research rejected this hypothesis. As of now, the biogeography of trogons remains unresolved but data analyses strongly suggest they originated from Laurasia.

The Diard's trogon is closely related to the Philippine trogon (H. ardens) as its sister taxon, while the Orange-breasted trogon (H. oreskios) forms their sister group.

== Description ==
The Diard's trogon is a medium-sized bird, measuring approximately 34 cm (13.4 in) in length and weighting about 100 g. Like other trogons, it has hunched shoulders, a long tail and vibrant plumage with a striking mix of contrasting colors. Males and females are similar in size but showcase differences in their plumage. Both males and females have a blue bill with a black tip.

The adult male has a black head and upper breast paired with a purplish-blue eye ring. Its mid-crown to hind-crown has a maroon wash, while the hind collar and breastline are pink. The male's belly and vent are bright red, and its upperparts and uppertail are pale brown. Its undertail is marked with blackish patterns that appears grayish-white.

The adult female has a plumage with more earthy tones and softer hues, featuring a muted brownish head and upper breast, with lower underparts displaying a brighter pinkish-red hue compared to the male. Juvenile individuals look like females.

== Habitat and distribution ==
The Diard's trogon is primarily found in the middle and lower layers of both primary and logged forests within lowland and hilly regions, extending up to an elevation of 900 m in Peninsular Malaysia, while in Thailand, it is encountered at altitudes rarely exceeding 600 m. It is also present in peat swamp forests found in Brunei and Sumatra, highlighting its adaptability to diverse habitats.

In Borneo, its habitat includes a variety of environments such as lowland, upland, and highland dipterocarp forests, as well as logged dipterocarp areas, streamside vegetation, and kerangas, which is an impoverished heath forest. Additionally, it can be seen in cocoa plantations located near secondary forest areas, typically at elevations up to 1200 m, although it is usually found at significantly lower altitudes.

Diard's Trogon inhabits regions in Indonesia and the Malaysian sections of Borneo, along with the island of Bangka, located east of Sumatra in Indonesia, as well as the Thai peninsula.

== Behavior ==
=== Vocalizations ===
The Diard's trogon vocalizations are characterized by a sequence of 10 to 12 "kau" notes, with the second note higher than the first, while the subsequent notes generally decrease in pitch. The final few notes usually descend further, resulting in a characteristic and rhythmic sequence.

=== Diet ===
Their diet consists of a variety of insects, including caterpillars, beetles, stick insects, locusts, and other members of the Orthoptera order. In addition to these insects, they also consume various fruits including those from different species of Ficus.

=== Reproduction ===
It excavates its nest in an old or dead trunk, typically at a height between 1m and 3 m. The breeding season for Diard's Trogon occurs from February to mid-May in Peninsular Malaysia, while in Borneo, it spans from mid-May to August, potentially extending into September. However, some birds have also been observed in breeding condition during February and April.

== Conservation ==
The species is currently categorized by the IUCN Red list as near-threatened, and was last assessed in October 2016. In this case, Diard's trogons are threatened by practices such as the cultivation of annual and perennial non-timber crops, logging and wood harvesting, as well as fire management activities, including both fire use and suppression [7].
