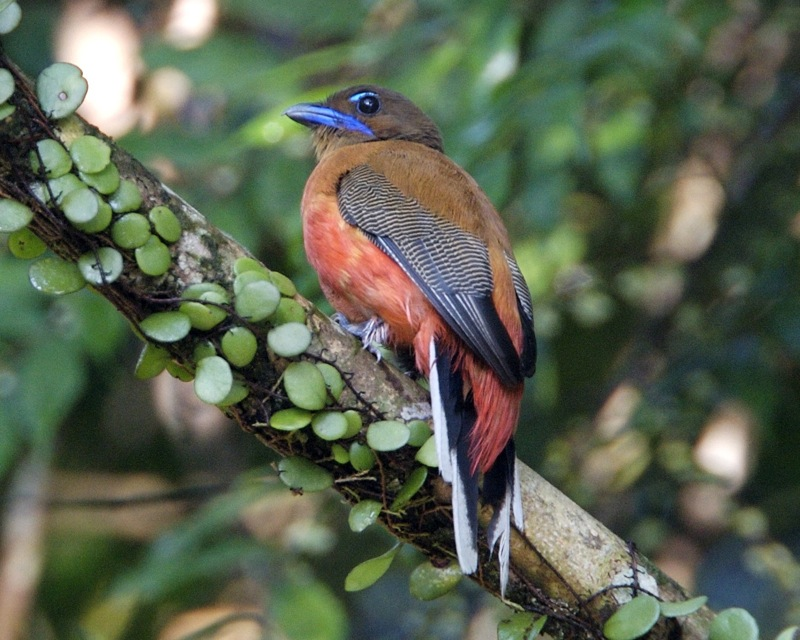
- Female

Conservation status
- Near Threatened (IUCN 3.1)

Scientific classification
- Kingdom: Animalia
- Phylum: Chordata
- Class: Aves
- Order: Trogoniformes
- Family: Trogonidae
- Genus: Harpactes
- Species: H. duvaucelii

Binomial name
- Harpactes duvaucelii (Temminck, 1824)

= Scarlet-rumped trogon =

Species of bird

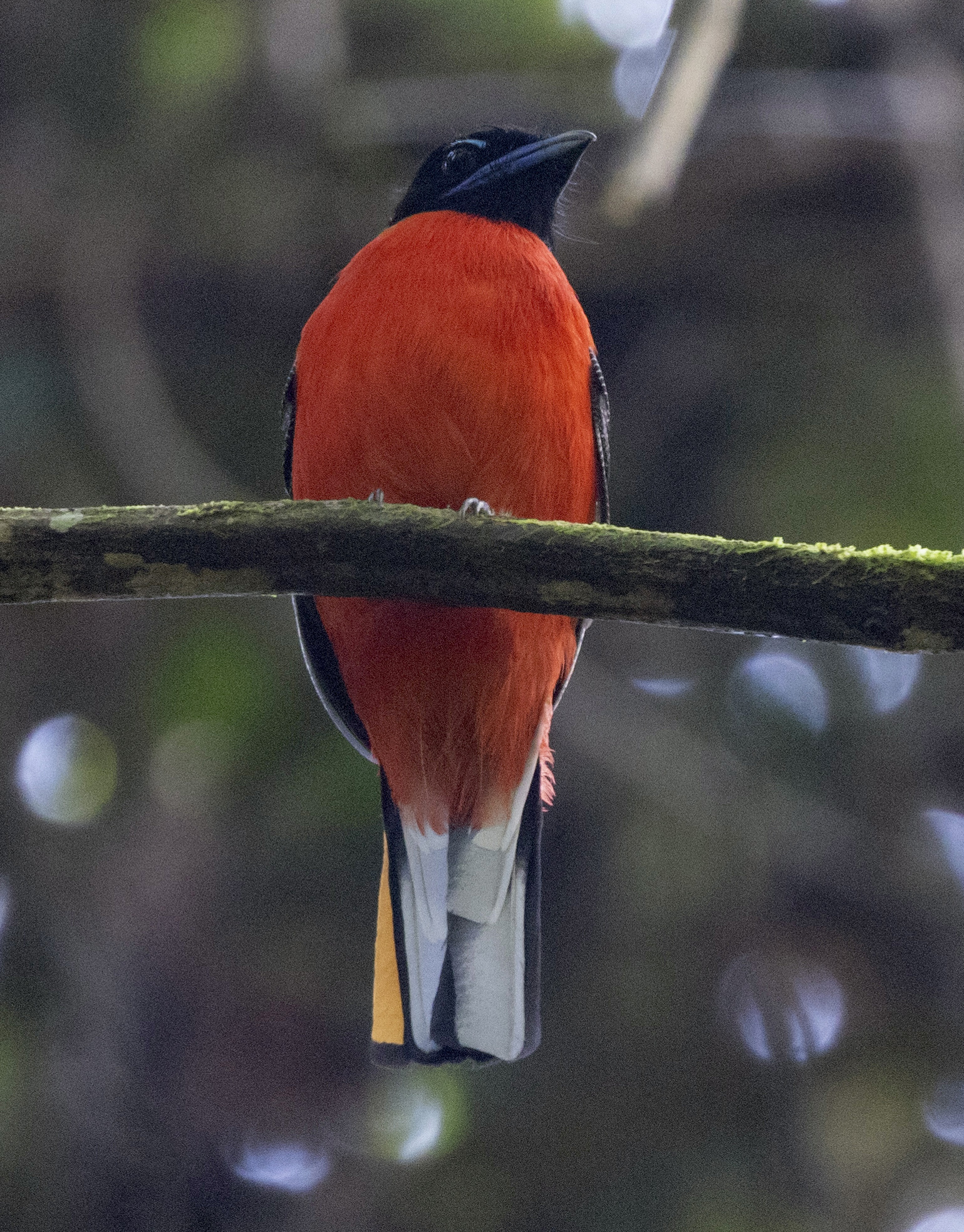
Male in Thailand

The scarlet-rumped trogon (Harpactes duvaucelii) is a species of bird in the family Trogonidae. It has also been called the red-rumped trogon and Duvaucel's trogon. It is distinguishable from other trogons by its small size and reddish rump. This species is generally solitary except mating and raising young, which is done in pairs. It is found within certain lowland forests of Indonesia, Malaysia, Myanmar, and Thailand. It is currently considered near threatened by Red List Assessments due to habitat loss.

== Taxonomy ==
This species was named by Coenraad Jacob Temminck in 1824, a Dutch zoologist, in Sumatra. The common name, Duvaucel's trogon, and its species epithet duvaucelii, is in honor of Aldred Duvaucel, a naturalist and explorer. It is most closely related to the cinnamon-rumped trogon (Harpactes orrhophaeus). These two species were formerly in their own separate genus, Duvaucelius, before being moved into Harpactes. Following DNA sequencing of mitochondrial and nuclear loci done in 2010, it was determined that they were in a separate clade.

== Description ==
The scarlet-rumped trogon is the world's smallest trogon, with adults measuring around 23–24 cm (9.1–9.4 in) with wings of 10 to 11 cm (3.9 to 4.3 in) in length, tails of about 11 to 13.5 cm (4.3 to 5.3 in), and weighing between 34 and 43 g (1.2 and 1.5 oz). Its eggs are estimated to measure 23.7 mm × 19.9 mm (0.93 in × 0.78 in) and weigh 5.2 g (0.18 oz).

Males have a black head, neck and throat, but females and juveniles are a duller brown. Males have red underparts, rump and uppertail coverts along with rich buff or yellowish-brown upperparts and uppertail. On the other hand, females have a buffy-brown breast, a reddish-pink belly, and pinkish rump and uppertail-coverts. Juveniles are similar to females in coloration, yet lack pink, instead being more rufously colored. Both sexes have a blue bill, eyebrow and thin eye ring along with pinkish, blueish, or rarely grayish black feet and toes. The underside of their tail is white with black bordering, and their wings are vermiculated with black and white (sometimes black and cinnamon in immature males). The scarlet-rumped trogon's distinguishable features, when compared to other species, are its small size and reddish rump.

== Habitat and distribution ==
This species is a native resident of lowland forests across southern Thailand, southern Myanmar, the Malay Peninsula, Sumatra, Riau Archipelago, and the islands of Banjak, Bangka, Belitung, Borneo, and Natuna. It hangs around the middle storeys of lowland semi-evergreen and evergreen forests, which include freshwater swamp forests, in lowlands and in hills. It is sometimes in the lower storeys and borders of forests, and in mature secondary growth forests but tends not to live in mangroves, in cultivated areas, or in open country. The presence of lianas is also favored by this species. The highest sightings of individuals vary depending on the location: in the Malay Peninsula, the highest sighting was at 1,070 m (3,510 ft), and on Mount Kinabalu, it was at 1,500 m (4,900 ft), while it was only about 400 m (1,300 ft) in Thailand. In Kalimantan, the height the birds were inhabiting varied between 120–900 m (390–2,950 ft).

== Behavior ==
There is no evidence to prove that the scarlet-rumped trogon largely migrates, except for augmented calling occurrences suggesting the possibility of local migration in the Bahan zone of Borneo. Individuals are usually alone or in mixed-species flocks, only sometimes occurring in pairs. Occasionally, they follow flocks of babblers looking for food. The scarlet-rumped trogon is often found perched on branches in the lower storeys of thick jungle forests. Once perched, it is unable to walk or turn around unless is uses its wings due to highly reduced leg muscles.

=== Vocalizations ===
Males have been recorded to emit a call of 12 short and rapid "yau" notes that accelerate in a diminuendo, sometimes to the point that they seem to merge, a much quicker call than other trogons. Females produce quiet rattles. When in alarm, the scarlet-rumped trogon utters quiet "kir-r-r-r" whirrings. This species also has a call that is similar to a scolding squirrel.

=== Diet ===
Its diet mainly consists of moths, beetles, stick insects, locustid orthopterans, larvae, and caterpillars, other "bugs", and in one case even a nymphalid. It also consumes fruit and vertebrates that are small enough to fit down its throat. Trogons are still-hunting predators: they wait on branches in the middle storeys of the forest before rushing at prey on other surfaces or in the air. Sometimes, they rest at the edge of cleared areas before swooping in, similarly to shrikes.

=== Reproduction ===
Adults molt their wings typically from May to October, mostly between June and August. The breeding period occurs from February to June, specifically in March and May in Peninsular Malaysia and May in Perak. Hatched chicks were recorded between mid-March and May, and care is done by both parents. Adults were seen still supplying the bulk of the food for their young and tending them at the 17-week mark after hatching. Birds excavate or reuse tree cavities for their nests. There is only one specifically documented nest for this species: it was 1.6 m (5.2 ft) up in a 2.5 m (8.2 ft) tall rotten stump and contained two eggs. However, this nest finding is questioned, and there is no further information available on the reproduction of this species.

== Status and conservation ==
This species was listed as Near Threatened (NT) in 2024 by the IUCN, the same as it has been since 2004, previously being listed as unknown (low risk/near threatened). This assessment was due to it being suspected of declining at a "moderately rapid" rate (20-29% over the course of three generations). The reason for this suspected decline is the loss of habitat, specifically in the Sundaic lowlands. Trogons are amongst the taxa where logging rarifies their presence. The global population size is unknown, but as it is the most common Sundaic trogon in many places, it is estimated to be relatively large. It is recommended to continue monitoring its population rates via habitat size and to protect more lowland forest areas, its range already encompassing a few protected areas.

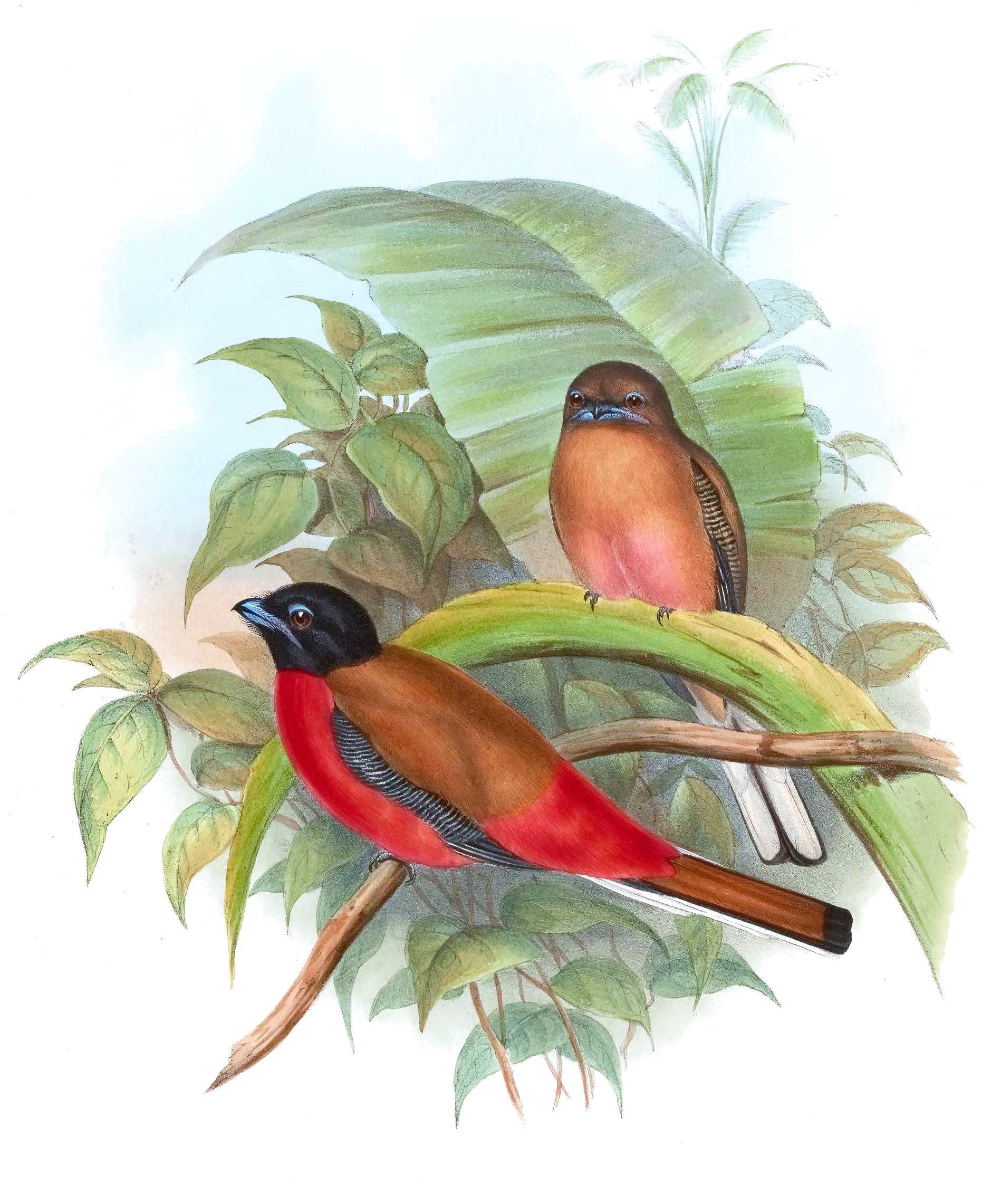
Male and Female
