= Daniatrogon =

Daniatrogon Temporal range: Early Eocene, Ypresian
- Holotype

Scientific classification
- Kingdom: Animalia
- Phylum: Chordata
- Class: Aves
- Order: Trogoniformes
- Genus: †Daniatrogon; Mayr, 2026
- Species: †D. kochi

Binomial name
- †Daniatrogon kochi Mayr, 2026

Extinct bird genus

Daniatrogon is an extinct genus of trogon bird known from the early Eocene (Ypresian age) of Denmark. The genus contains a single species, Daniatrogon kochi, known from a well-preserved, nearly complete skeleton. The highly elongated hallux of Daniatrogon suggests that it and other stem group trogoniforms were much more mobile whilst they were foraging, contrasting with the sedentary foraging habits of extant trogonids.
