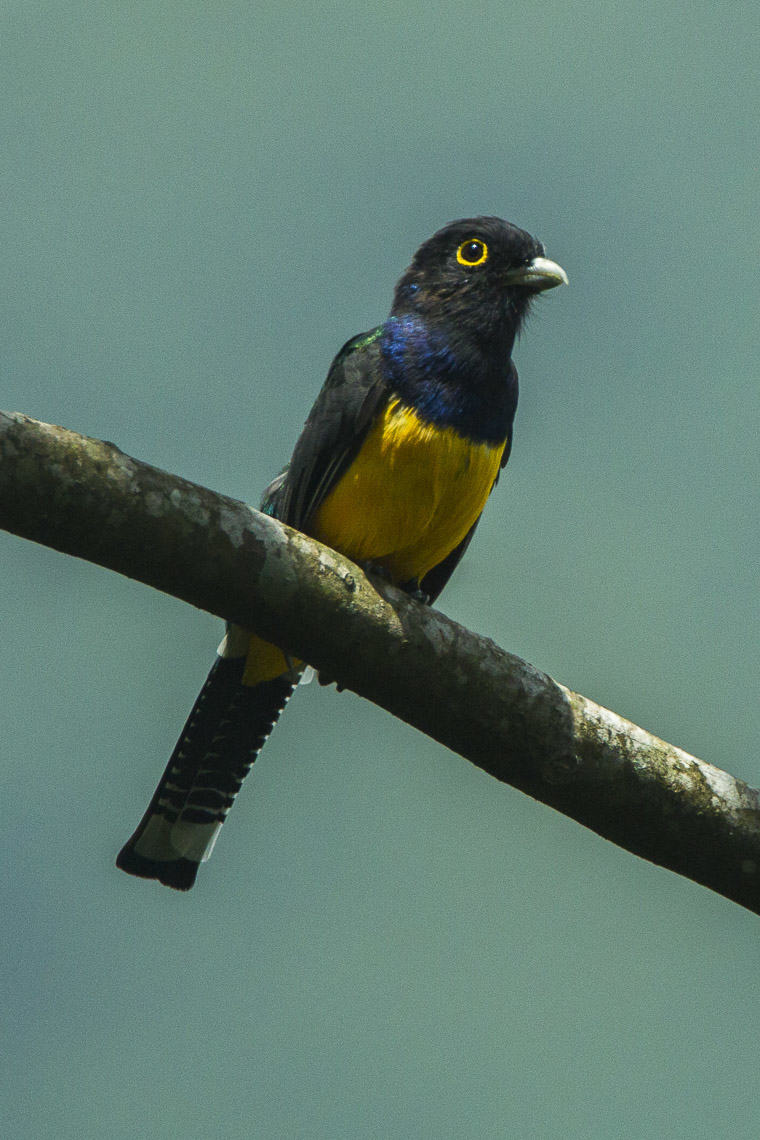
- Male, Mexico
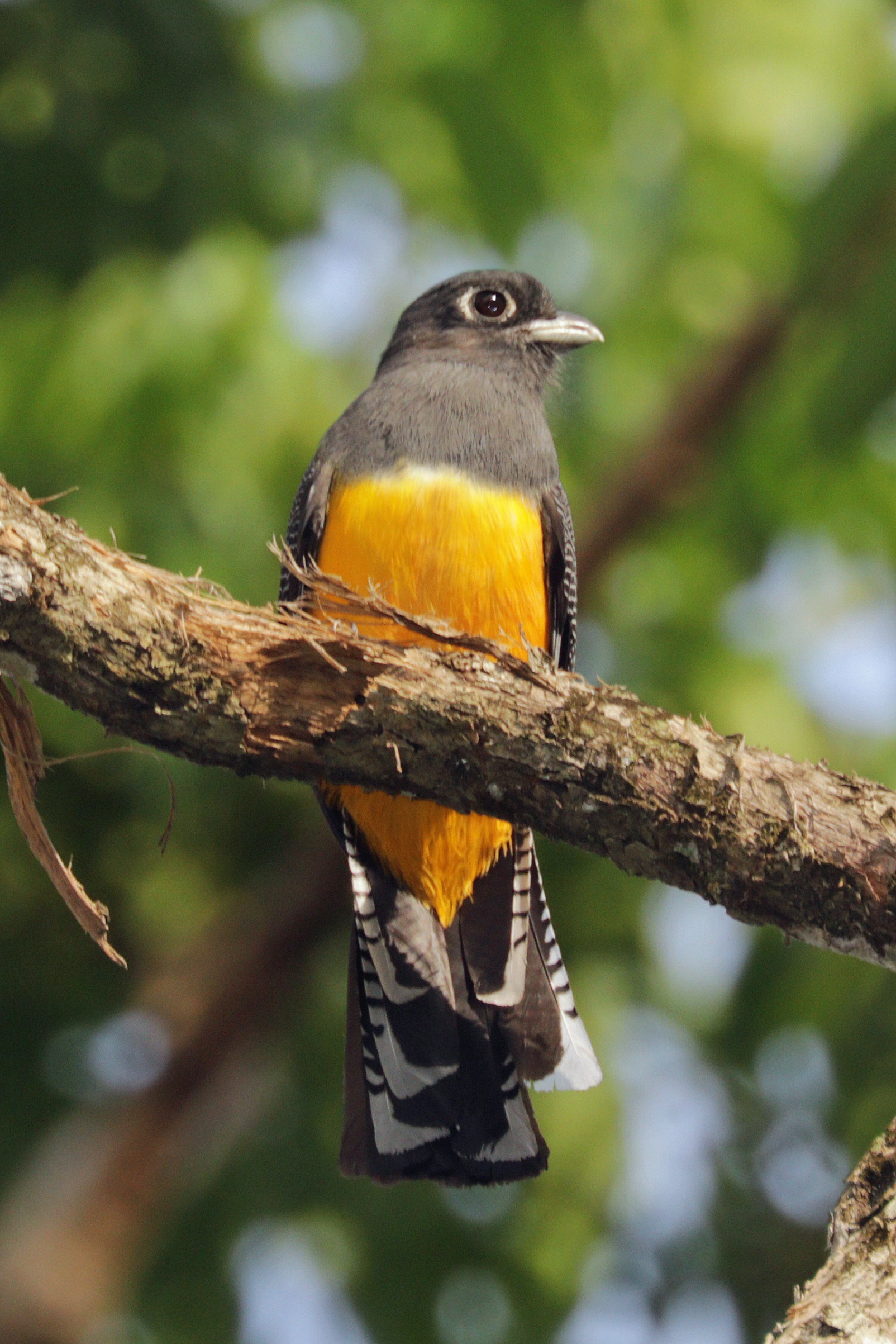
- Female, Panama

Scientific classification
- Kingdom: Animalia
- Phylum: Chordata
- Class: Aves
- Order: Trogoniformes
- Family: Trogonidae
- Genus: Trogon
- Species: T. caligatus

Binomial name
- Trogon caligatus Gould, 1838

Synonyms
- Trogon violaceus caligatus

= Gartered trogon =

Gartered violaceous trogon

Species of bird

The gartered violaceous trogon (Trogon caligatus), also known as the northern violaceous trogon, is a bird in the family Trogonidae, the quetzals and trogons. It is found in Mexico, all of Central America, and Colombia, Ecuador, Peru, and Venezuela.

== Taxonomy and systematics ==
Until the early 2000s, what are now the gartered trogon and the Amazonian trogon (T. ramonianus) were considered subspecies of the violaceous trogon (T. violaceous). The International Ornithological Committee (IOC), the Clements taxonomy, and the South American Classification Committee of the American Ornithological Society (AOS-SACC) have implemented the split making them separate species and renaming T. violaceous the Guianan trogon. However, BirdLife International's Handbook of the Birds of the World (HBW) retains them as subspecies. The classification schemes that treat the gartered trogon as a species assign three subspecies, the nominate T. c. caligatus, T. c. sallaei, and T. c. concinnus.

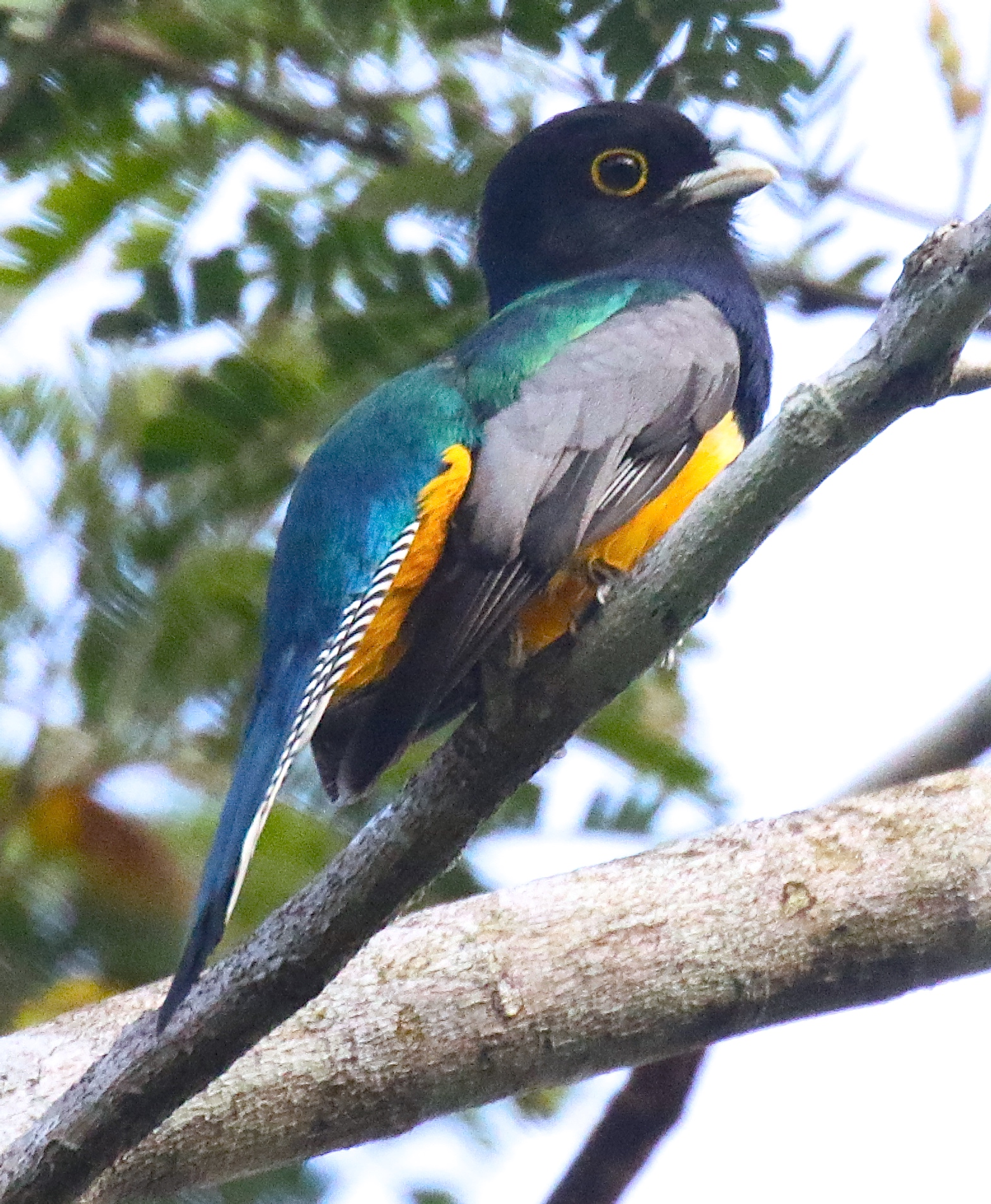
Chan Chich Lodge area - Belize

== Description ==
Most trogons have distinctive male and female plumages, with soft, often colorful, feathers. The gartered trogon is 23 to 25 cm (9.1 to 9.8 in) long and weighs 38 to 57 g (1.3 to 2.0 oz). The nominate male's head, neck, and upper breast are a violet-blue. The face and throat are black with a pale yellow ring around the eye. A narrow white band separates the upper breast from the bright yellow lower breast and belly. The upperparts are metallic green. The tail's upperside is violet-blue with black feather tips; the underside has fine black and white bars and broad white feather tips. The wings are mostly black with some whitish inclusions. The female's head and face, upper breast, and upperparts are gray; the eyering is not complete, the belly is a duller yellow than the male's, and the underside of the tail has a different pattern of black and white.

T. c. sallaei has a blackish head and upper breast and a blue nape and lower breast. Its upperparts are a yellower green than the nominate's and the upper side of the tail is green. T. c. concinnus is similar to sallaei but its upperparts and tail are bluer.

== Distribution and habitat ==
T. c. sallaei is the northernmost subspecies of gartered trogon. It is found on the Caribbean slope of central Mexico and from the Caribbean and Pacific slopes of southern Mexico through Belize, Guatemala, and El Salvador into northern Honduras and possibly into Nicaragua. T. c. concinnus is found from Costa Rica through most of Panama into western Colombia, and separately from western Ecuador into northwestern Peru. The nominate T. c. caligatus is found from the Caribbean slope of Panama's Darién Province through northern Colombia into western Venezuela. It is a year round resident in Mexico but its movements elsewhere, if any, are unknown.

The gartered trogon is generally a bird of semi-open landscapes such as forest edges, clearings, gallery forest, secondary forest, and shaded coffee and cacao plantations. In Mexico it is also found in denser evergreen forest and rainforest. In elevation it ranges as high as 1,400 m (4,600 ft) in Central America but is generally more common in lowlands.

== Behavior ==
=== Feeding ===
The gartered trogon usually feeds by hovering to pick fruit and invertebrates from vegetation. It diet includes a larger amount of fruit than most other trogons but also many types of insects and other invertebrates. It sometimes joins mixed-species foraging flocks.

=== Breeding ===
The gartered trogon's breeding season spans from March to June in Mexico, May to July in El Salvador, and February to June in Costa Rica. It nests in a wasp, ant, or termite arboreal nest or a hole in a rotten tree, with a typical clutch of two or three eggs.

=== Vocalization ===
The gartered trogon's song is "a long series of rapid hollow downslurred notes, kyu-kyu-kyu-kyu-kyu-kyu". It also makes a "rolling chattering" call.

== Status ==
The IUCN has not assessed the gartered trogon separately from violaceous trogon sensu lato. It is fairly common to common in most of its range though very rare in Venezuela.
