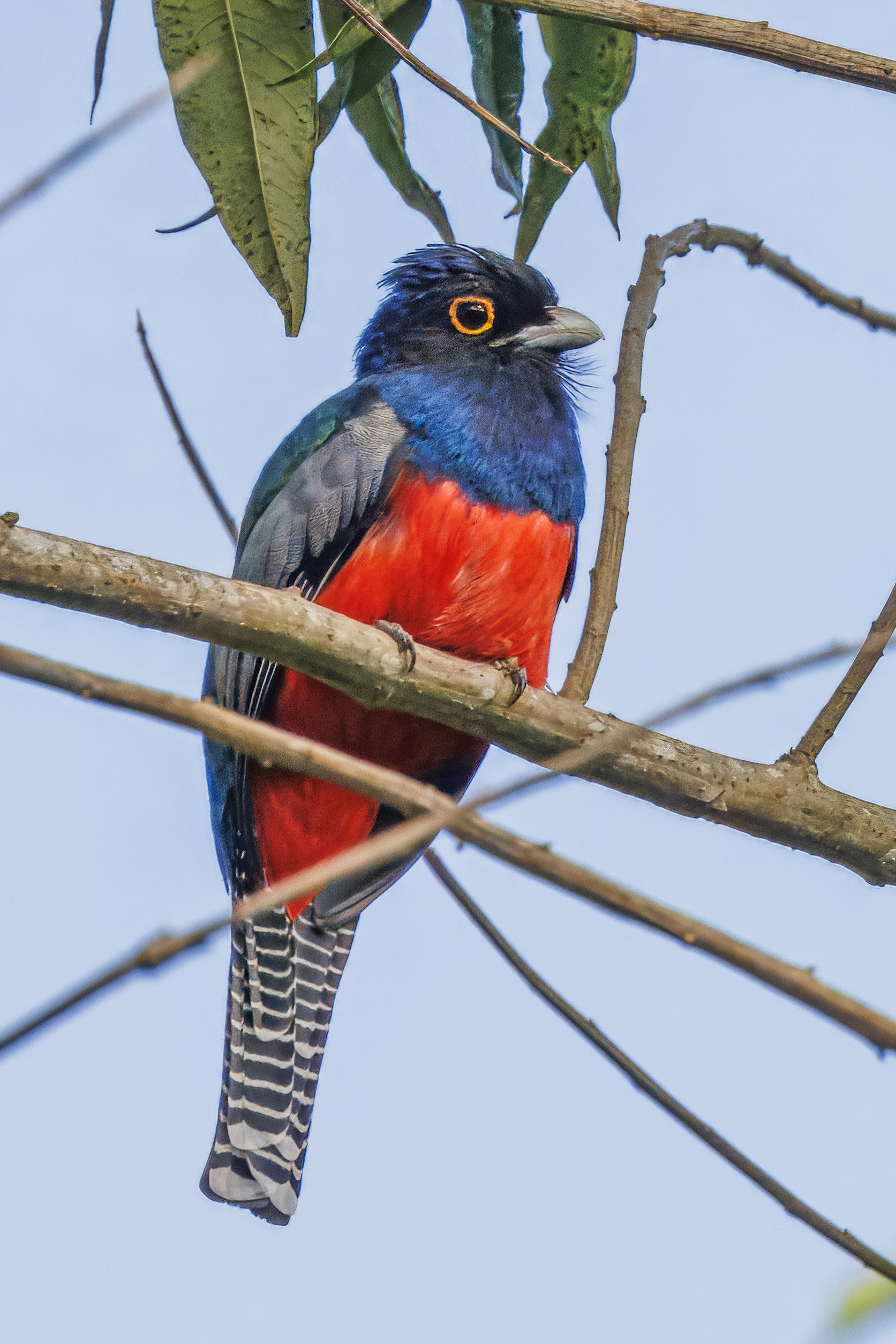
- Male T. c. peruvianus, Ecuador

Conservation status
- Least Concern (IUCN 3.1)

Scientific classification
- Kingdom: Animalia
- Phylum: Chordata
- Class: Aves
- Order: Trogoniformes
- Family: Trogonidae
- Genus: Trogon
- Species: T. curucui

Binomial name
- Trogon curucui Linnaeus, 1766

Synonyms
- Trogon bolivianus Ogilvie-Grant, 1892

= Blue-crowned trogon =

Species of bird

The blue-crowned trogon (Trogon curucui) is a species of bird in the family Trogonidae, the quetzals and trogons. It is found in Brazil, Argentina, Bolivia, Colombia, Ecuador, Paraguay, and Peru. As with all trogons, this species is sexually dimorphic. The male has a blue head with an orange orbital ring, a red belly with a narrow white breastband and a green back. The female differs in having a grey head, a grey back and a broken white eye-ring.

== Taxonomy ==
The blue-crowned trogon was formally described by the Swedish naturalist Carl Linnaeus in 1766 in the twelfth edition of his Systema Naturae. He placed it with the other trogons in the genus Trogon and coined the binomial name Trogon curucui. Linnaeus based his description on the "Curucui" that had been described and illustrated in 1648 by the German naturalist Georg Marcgrave in his book Historia Naturalis Brasiliae. The name "Curucui" and the specific epithet are derived from Surucui, a word from the extinct Brazilian Tupi language for a small bird. A 2008 molecular phylogenetic study of the genus Trogon found that the blue-crowned trogon was sister to the yellow-bellied Guianan trogon (T. violaceus).

Three subspecies are recognised:

- T. c. peruvianus Swainson, 1838 – south Colombia to Bolivia and central Brazil
- T. c. curucui Linnaeus, 1766 – east Brazil
- T. c. behni Gould, 1875 – east Bolivia, southwest Brazil, Paraguay and north Argentina

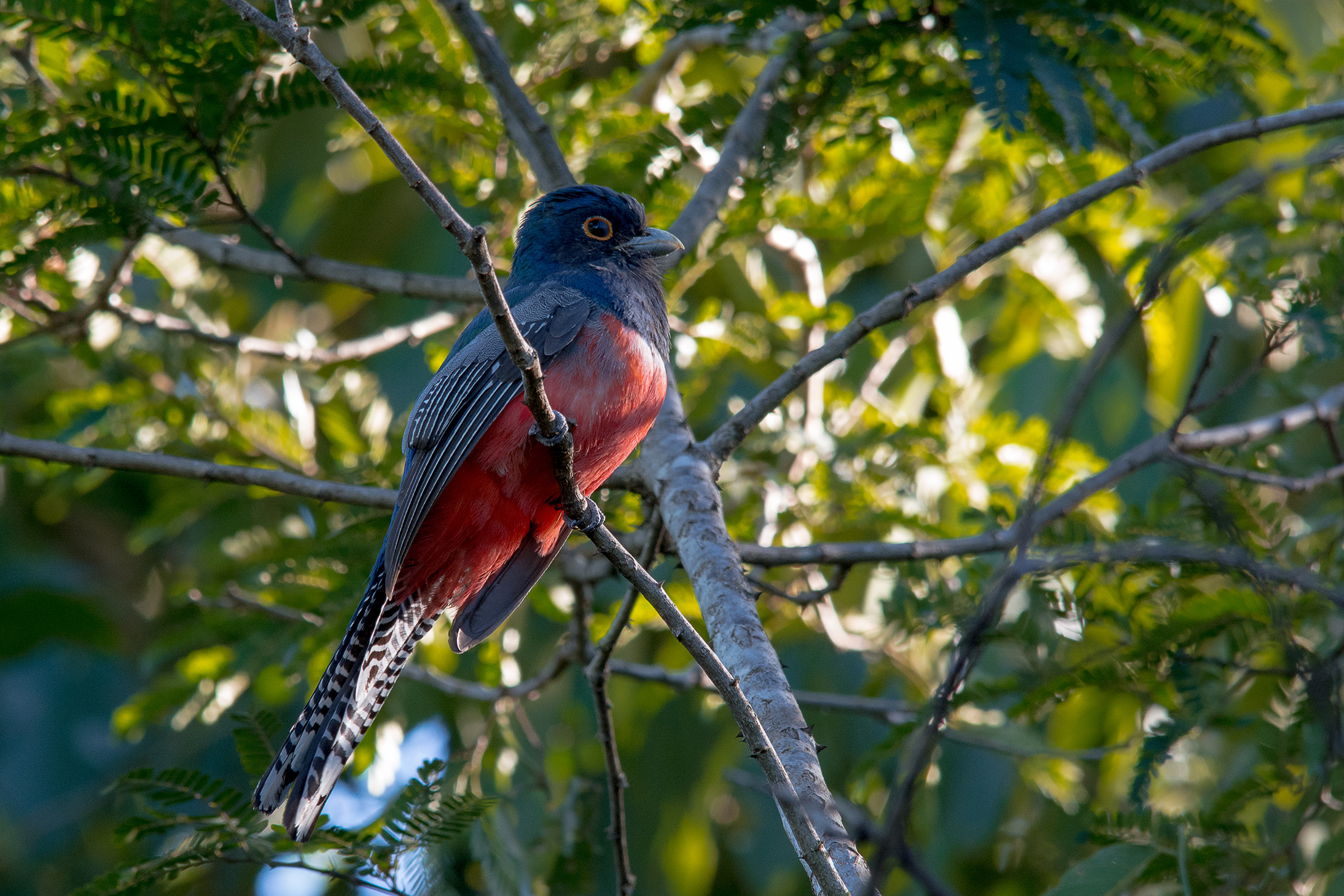
Near Campo Grande in Brazil

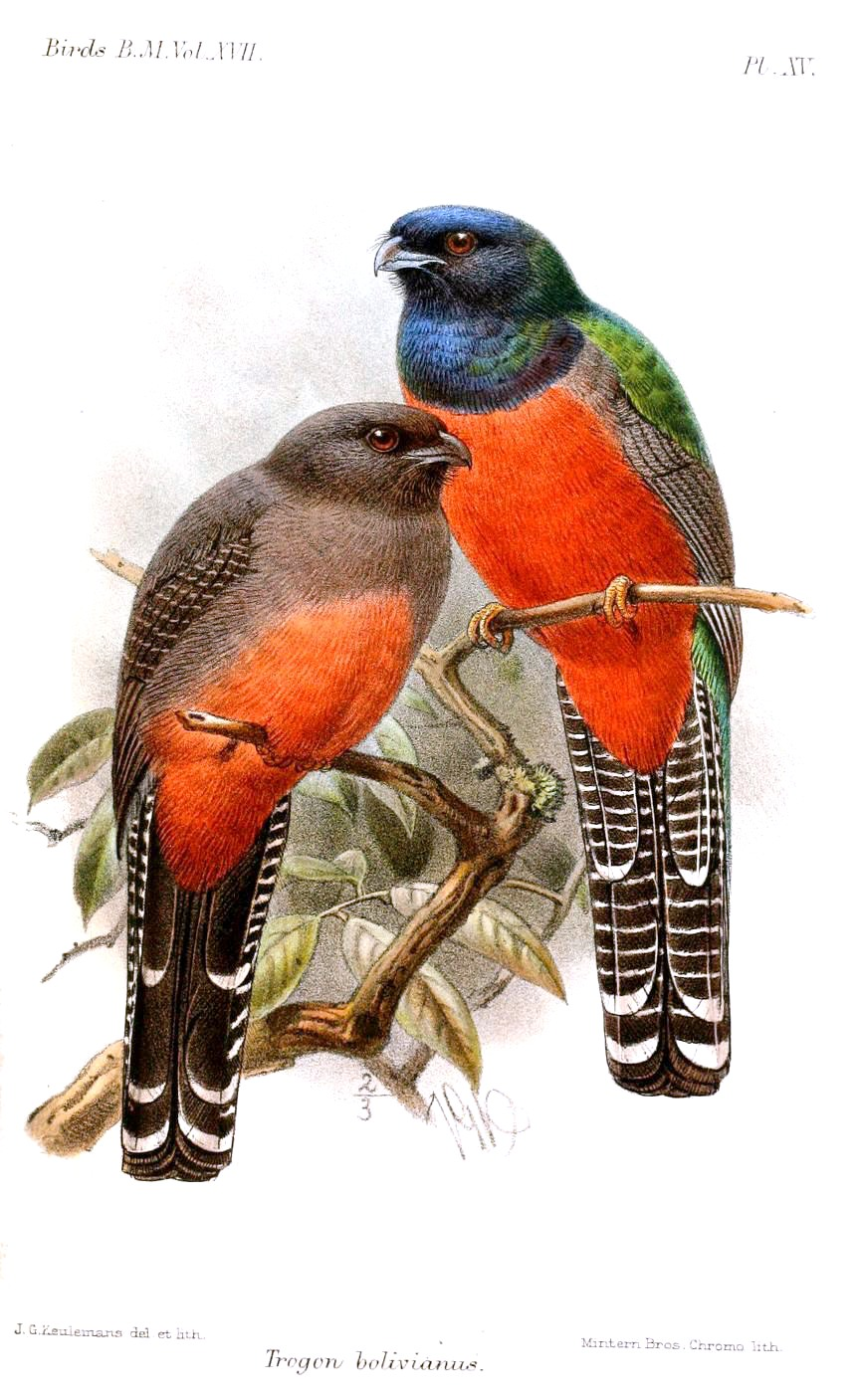
Illustration by Keulemans, 1892

== Description ==
The blue-crowned trogon is about 24 cm (9.4 in) long and weighs 39 to 63 g (1.4 to 2.2 oz). The male of the nominate subspecies has a blackish face and throat with an orange ring around the eye. The crown, sides of the neck, and breast are glossy greenish blue, the nape turquoise-green, and the back metallic bronzy green. The upperside of the tail is greenish blue and the underside has black and white bars. The folded wing has fine vermiculation that looks gray at a distance. The breast is separated from the rosy red belly and vent by a white band. The female is gray where the male is green and the belly is pinkish red. Instead of the orange ring around the eye there are white arcs before and after it. The underside of the tail has a different black and white pattern. The male of T. c. peruvianus has a bluish gloss to the bronzy green back, a much reduced white breast band, and narrower white bars on the undertail. The male T. c. behni's back is more intensely bronze than the nominate's, and the breast is greener.

The male blue-crowned trogon's song is "a fast, evenly paced repetition of...'kow' [notes], lasting about 4-5 seconds and ending abruptly". Both sexes give a "churrr" call.

== Distribution and habitat ==
The blue-crowned trogon is found throughout the Amazon Basin south of the Amazon River and south and east from there as well. The nominate subspecies is found from Amazonian central Brazil east to the Atlantic Ocean. T. c. peruvianus is found in the Andean foothills of southern Colombia, eastern Ecuador and Peru, and northwestern Bolivia and from there east into Amazonian Brazil as far as the Tapajós River. T. c. behni is found in eastern and southern Bolivia, southwestern Brazil, much of Paraguay, and northern Argentina.

It inhabits a variety of landscapes across its large range. Forest types include várzea, gallery, tall secondary, and dry semi-deciduous. It occupies all levels from the understory to the canopy. It is also found in savanna woodland, dry palm forest, caatinga, and scrublands. In the northern part of its range it seldom occurs above 500 m (1,600 ft) of elevation but reaches as high as 1,500 m (4,900 ft) in Argentina and 1,750 m (5,700 ft) in Bolivia.

== Behavior ==
=== Feeding ===
The blue-crowned trogon's diet includes a wide variety of insects and spiders, and also fruits. It sometimes joins mixed-species foraging flocks.

=== Breeding ===
The blue-crowned trogon's breeding season varies across its range. It starts as early as May in Colombia and spans from October to December in Argentina. It nests in cavities in arboreal termitaria. The clutch size is two or three eggs.

== Status ==
The IUCN has assessed the blue-crowned trogon as being of Least Concern, though its population is unknown and is believed to be decreasing. It is rare to common in different parts of its range and occurs in several protected areas in Bolivia, Brazil, and Argentina.
