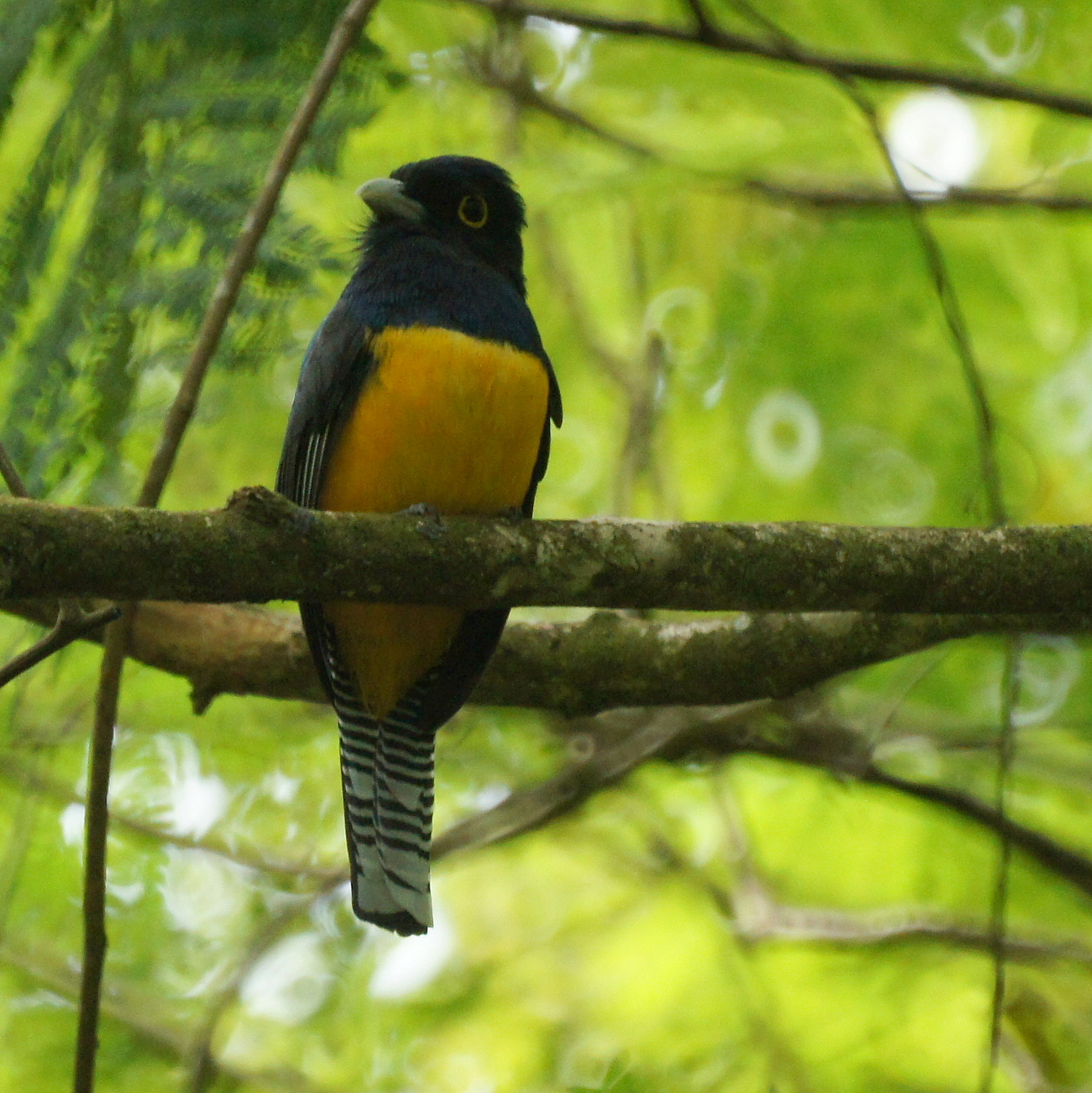

Scientific classification
- Kingdom: Animalia
- Phylum: Chordata
- Class: Aves
- Order: Trogoniformes
- Family: Trogonidae
- Genus: Trogon
- Species: T. violaceus

Binomial name
- Trogon violaceus Gmelin, JF, 1788

= Guianan trogon =

Species of bird

The Guianan trogon (Trogon violaceus) is a species of bird in the trogon and quetzal family Trogonidae. It is found in Brazil, French Guiana, Guyana, Suriname, Trinidad, and Venezuela.

== Taxonomy and systematics ==
The Guianan trogon was formally described in 1788 by the German naturalist Johann Friedrich Gmelin in his revised and expanded edition of Carl Linnaeus's Systema Naturae. He placed it with the other trogons in the genus Trogon and coined the binomial name Trogon violaceus. Gmelin based his account on a description and illustration by the German botanist Joseph Gottlieb Kölreuter that had been published 1765. Gmelin did not specify a type locality, but this has been designated as Suriname. The specific epithet violaceus is from Latin and means "violet-coloured". The species is now considered to be monotypic: no subspecies are recognised.

The Guianan trogon was formerly named the violaceous trogon and included the gartered trogon (T. caligatus) and the Amazonian trogon (T. ramonianus) as subspecies. A molecular phylogenetic study of the genus Trogon based on a single mitochondrial gene was published in 2008. It found that the Guianan trogon, the blue-crowned trogon (T. curucui) and the Surucua trogon (T. surrucura) formed a well defined clade but the three Guianan trogon subspecies did not form a monophyletic group.

The Guianan trogon is treated as a monotypic species by the South American Classification Committee of the American Ornithological Society (SACC), the International Ornithological Committee (IOC), and the Clements taxonomy. BirdLife International's Handbook of the Birds of the World (HBW) treats it as the nominate subspecies of violaceous trogon. HBW also includes five other subspecies that the SACC, IOC, and Clements treat as members of two full species, gartered trogon (T. caligatus) and Amazonian trogon (T. ramonianus). The SACC notes that the split into three species might deserve reevaluation.

== Description ==
The Guianan trogon is 23 to 25 cm (9.1 to 9.8 in) long and weighs 38 to 57 g (1.3 to 2.0 oz). Males and females have very different plumage. Adult males have a violet-blue head with a black mask and throat; their bill is pale blue-gray and their dark eye is surrounded by bare pale yellow skin. The violet-blue of their head extends to the middle of their breast, where a narrow white band separates it from the bright yellow of the rest of their underparts. Their upperparts are bright metallic green and their wings so finely marked with black and white that they appear dark gray-brown. Their tail's upper surface is violet-blue with black tips to the feathers; the lower surface has fine black and white bars and wide white tips to the feathers. Adult females' bills have a blackish culmen and the face has white arcs above and below the eye. Their head and upperparts are dark gray and their wings are thinly but densely barred black and white. Their belly is a duller yellow than the male's and has a gray wash on the flanks. The underside of their tail appears barred on its sides. Juvenile males have browner wings and less white on their undertail than adults. Juvenile females are like the adult.

The Guinan trogon's song is "a long series of rapid hollow downslurred whistles, kyu-kyu-kyu-kyu-kyu-kyu". Its calls include "rolling chattering."

== Distribution and habitat ==
The Guianan trogon is non-migratory. It is found in Trinidad, eastern Venezuela, the Guianas, and adjacent northern Brazil. It inhabits a variety of semi-open landscapes such as savanna, the edges and openings of primary forest, young secondary forest, cacao and coffee plantations, and terra firme forest. It ranges as high as 1,200 m (3,900 ft) in Venezuela.

== Behavior ==
=== Feeding ===
The Guianan trogon's diet is fruit and arthropods that it collects while hovering after short sallies from a perch. It often joins mixed-species foraging flocks.

=== Breeding ===
The Guianan trogon's breeding season is not fully defined but appears to be within the November to June period. It excavates a cavity in arboreal nests of paper wasps, ants, or termites and also in rotten wood or a fern root mass. The clutch size is two or three eggs. The incubation time is not known; fledging occurs at least 17 days after hatch.

== Status ==
The IUCN follows HBW taxonomy and so has not assessed the Guianan trogon separately from the violaceous trogon sensu lato. The species is "[r]are and local in Venezuela, but common in Trinidad and Suriname."
