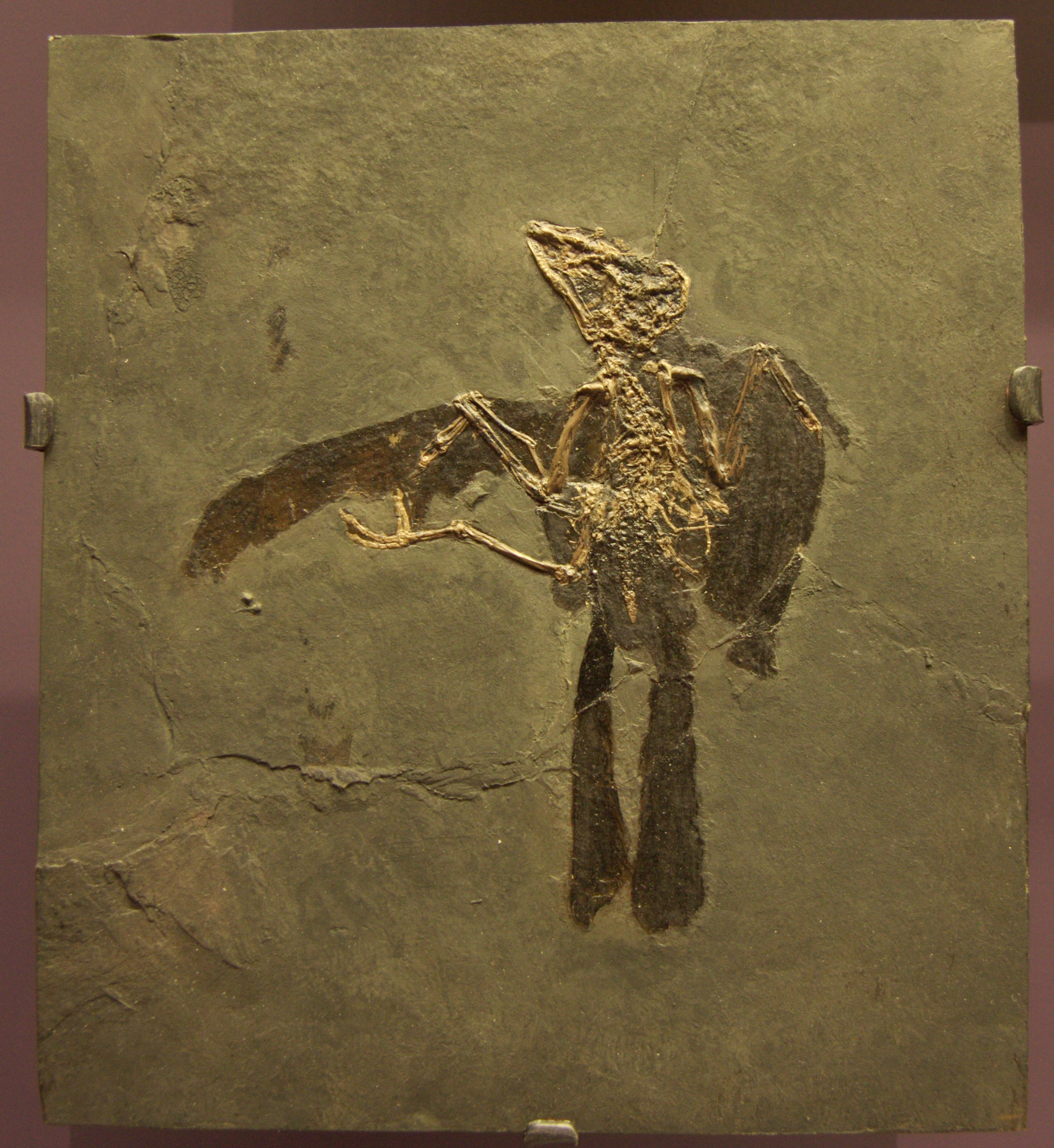
- Fossil

Scientific classification
- Kingdom: Animalia
- Phylum: Chordata
- Class: Aves
- Order: Trogoniformes
- Family: Trogonidae
- Genus: †Masillatrogon; Mayr, 2009

= Masillatrogon =

Extinct genus of birds

Masillatrogon is an extinct genus of trogon. Its remains were found in the Messel Pit of Germany.
