= Bare-cheeked trogon =

Conservation status
- Least Concern (IUCN 3.1)

Scientific classification
- Kingdom: Animalia
- Phylum: Chordata
- Class: Aves
- Order: Trogoniformes
- Family: Trogonidae
- Genus: Apaloderma
- Species: A. aequatoriale

Binomial name
- Apaloderma aequatoriale Sharpe, 1901

Species of bird

The bare-cheeked trogon (Apaloderma aequatoriale) is a species of bird in the family Trogonidae found in the rainforests of western central Africa.

== Description ==
The bare-cheeked trogon physically resembles the narina trogon, but it has bright yellow facial skin while narina trogons have green facial skin. They also differ from narina trogons in smaller size and shorter tail. Bare-cheeked trogons are sexually dismorphic. The male's back, head and upper breast is green blueish; and its lower breast is pinkish red. Its wings are pale grey and finely barred; and it has a yellow bare facial patch. The female shares the same wing coloration and also has that distinct yellow facial patch, however its whole breast is pinkish red and only the back and the back of its head are bluish-green. Both sexes have a white undertail and a yellow bill, and measure 28-31 cm.

They have heterodactyl feet which is a distinctive feature only Trogons share.

== Taxonomy ==
Bare-cheeked trogons are part of the order Trogoniformes which only includes one family, Trogonidae. This family includes a variety of species which live in tropical and subtropical forests throughout the Americas, Africa, Asia and Pacific islands. The bare-cheeked trogon is one of three African species belonging to the genus Apaloderma; the other two species are bar-tailed trogon and Narina trogon. Based on molecular data, narina trogons and bare-cheeked trogons are sister-taxa. The bare-cheeked trogon is monotypic, with no subspecies accepted.

== Distribution and habitat ==
=== Distribution ===
Bare-cheeked trogons are found year-round across central west Africa and do not typically migrate. It is found in Cameroon, Central African Republic, Republic of the Congo, Democratic Republic of the Congo, Equatorial Guinea, Gabon, and Nigeria.

=== Habitat ===
The bare-cheeked trogon lives in interior of lowland rainforests. They can be found in closed-canopy swamp-forest, low-lying liana-rich flood forest and logged forest with intact canopy. They spend most of their time in the subcanopy and rely on tree cavities to nest.

== Behaviour ==
=== Vocal behaviour ===
Bare-cheeked trogons can be easily differentiated from narina trogon by their songs. They have a distinct song described as a series of 6-8 "chuu"s repeated every 15–20 seconds. When adults arrive at the nest with food, they emit low grunting calls. It has been reported that bare-cheeped trogons engage in singing aggregations. This calling assemblage involves a group of 3 to 10 adult males, with occasional instances of up to 20, continuously calling as they pursue each other from one perching spot to another. Male narina trogons may also join this aggregation. These calling assemblages happen during brood period so they may be related to reproduction, but it still remains uncertain as they do not lead to copulation. This behaviour is common to several trogon species.

=== Diet ===
Just like their sister-taxa, narina trogons, bare-cheeked trogons are insectivores and feed on large green caterpillars, beetles, moths, mantises and bush-crickets. They also feed on grass and moss. They hunt similarly to drongos and can sometimes chase their prey to the ground. Indeed, their sister-taxa narina are sallying insectivores and hunt by launching from a stationary position onto stationary or moving prey, which might be a shared behaviour, however little is known about their hunting practices.

=== Reproduction ===
There is no fixed breeding season, it varies from region to region. They are monogamous and territorial. The male will fight for the possession of the nest which are formed in cavities 2–8 m up in rotting trees. Two eggs will be laid and will take 16 days to hatch. Once hatched, the young will be fed by both parents for another 16 days, hence both sexes participate in parental care.
