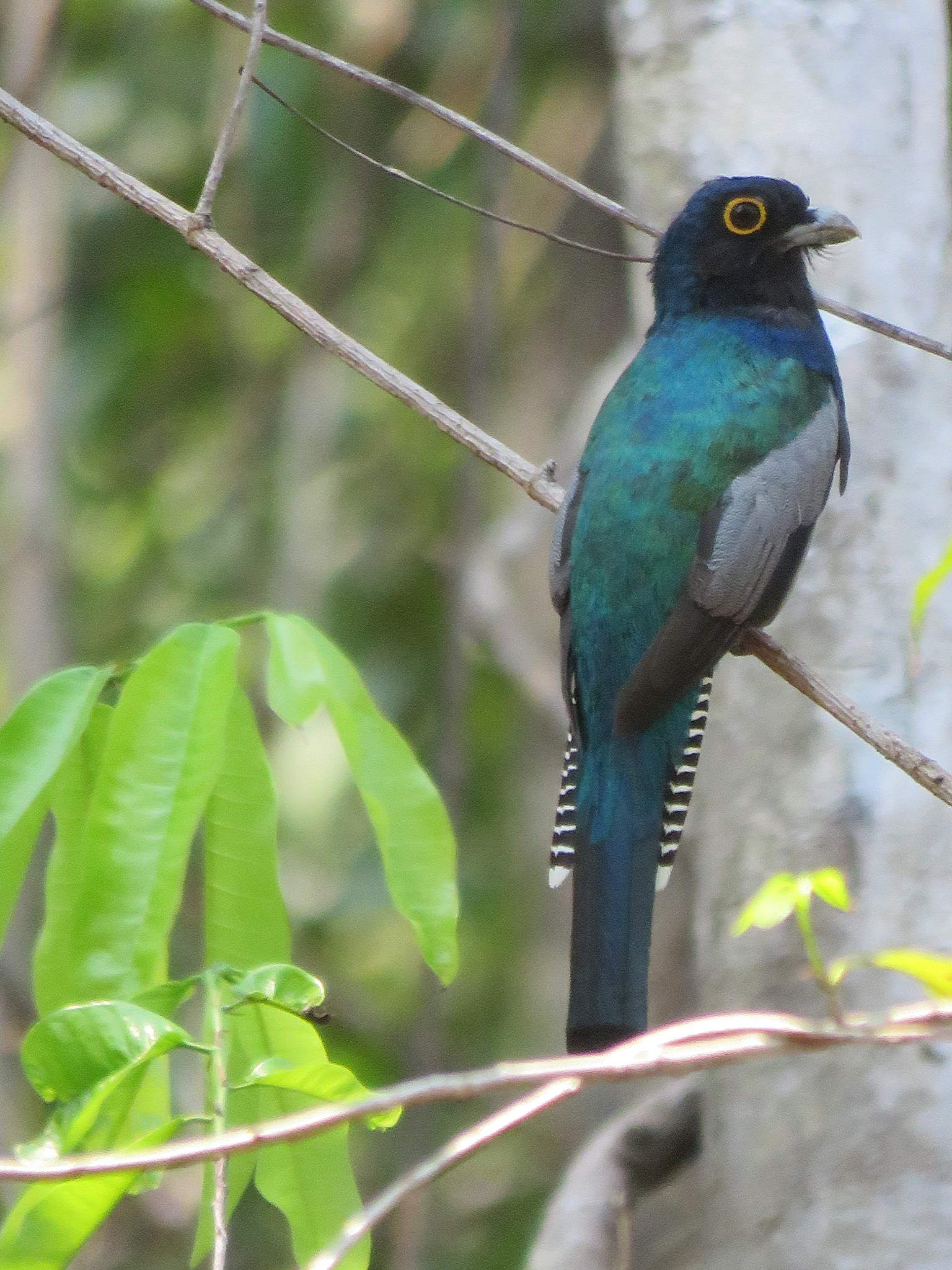

Scientific classification
- Kingdom: Animalia
- Phylum: Chordata
- Class: Aves
- Order: Trogoniformes
- Family: Trogonidae
- Genus: Trogon
- Species: T. ramonianus

Binomial name
- Trogon ramonianus Deville & Des Murs, 1849

= Amazonian trogon =

Species of bird

The Amazonian trogon (Trogon ramonianus), is a species of bird in the family Trogonidae, the trogons and quetzals. It is found in Bolivia, Brazil, Colombia, Ecuador, Peru, and Venezuela.

== Taxonomy and systematics ==
Until the early 2000s, what are now the Amazonian trogon and the gartered trogon (T. caligatus) were considered subspecies of the violaceous trogon (T. violaceous). The International Ornithological Committee (IOC), the Clements taxonomy, and the South American Classification Committee of the American Ornithological Society (AOS-SACC) have implemented the split making them separate species and renaming T. violaceous the Guianan trogon. However, BirdLife International's Handbook of the Birds of the World (HBW) retains them as subspecies. The classification schemes that treat the Amazonian trogon as a species assign two subspecies, the nominate T. r. ramonianus and T. r. crissalis. The two subspecies are so similar that some authors maintain that the Amazonian trogon is monotypic.

== Description ==
Trogons have distinctive male and female plumages, with soft, often colorful, feathers. The Amazonian trogon is about 23 to 25 cm (9.1 to 9.8 in) long; three males weighed 44 to 46 g (1.6 to 1.6 oz). The male's head, neck, and upper breast are a deep metallic blue-black. The face and throat are black, with little contrast between them and the rest of the head. A narrow white band separates the upper breast from the bright yellow lower breast and belly. The upperparts are metallic green to blue-green. The tail's upperside is deep blue with black feather tips; the underside has fine black and white bars and broad white feather tips. The wings are mostly black with some whitish inclusions. The female's head and face, upper breast, and upperparts are dark gray; the belly is a duller yellow than the male's, and the underside of the tail has a different pattern of black and white. The two subspecies' plumages differ very little, with the differences between them being similar to those among individuals of each.

== Distribution and habitat ==
The Amazonian trogon is found from the Andean foothills of Colombia, Ecuador, Peru, and Bolivia slightly north into western Venezuela and east across the western and southern Amazon basin of Brazil. The exact delination of the two subspecies' ranges is obscure, but T. r. crissalis is generally considered to be found south of the Amazon River and east of the Tapajós River.

The Amazonian trogon inhabits a variety of landscapes including transitional and terra firme forest, palm and bamboo forest, and permanently flooded igapó forest. It is found mostly below 500 m (1,600 ft) of elevation but reaches as high as 1,000 m (3,300 ft) in Ecuador.

== Behavior ==
=== Feeding ===
The Amazonian trogon's diet and feeding behavior have not been studied in detail. It is assumed to behave like the other "violaceus" trogons, feeding with sallies from a perch and hovering to pick insects and fruit from vegetation. They also eat small vertebrates such as frogs.

=== Breeding ===
Almost nothing is known about the Amazonian trogon's breeding phenology. The only nest that has been described was excavated in an active arboreal termite nest and held two eggs.

=== Vocalization ===
The Amazonian trogon's song is "a relatively short, fairly rapid series of clipped cow notes, or 'mewing whistles'". Their calls are "a variety of rolling chatters".

== Status ==
The IUCN has not assessed the Amazonian trogon separately from violaceous trogon sensu lato. It has a large range and is considered fairly common to common in some areas.
