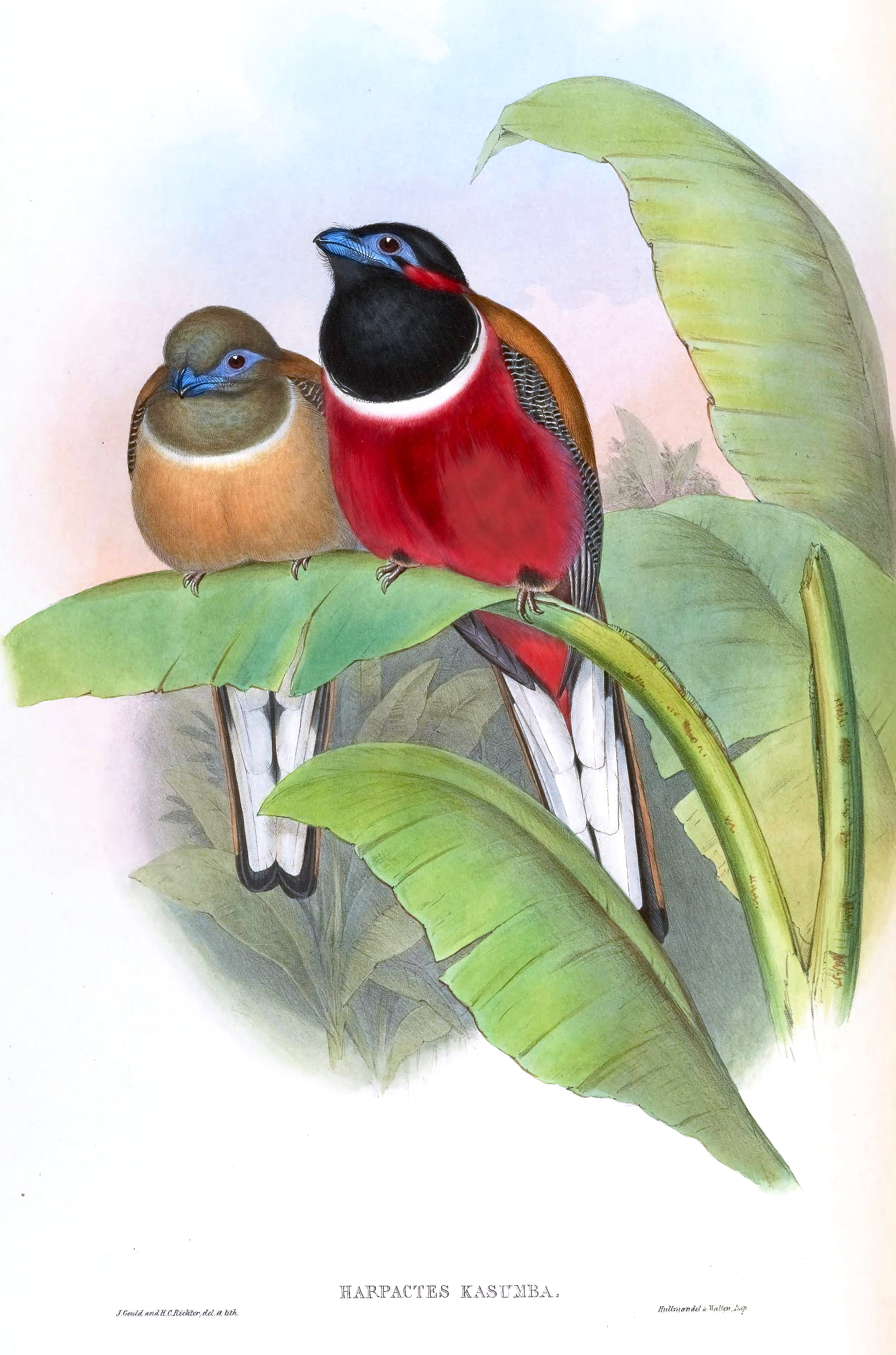
- Female and male

Conservation status
- Near Threatened (IUCN 3.1)

Scientific classification
- Kingdom: Animalia
- Phylum: Chordata
- Class: Aves
- Order: Trogoniformes
- Family: Trogonidae
- Genus: Harpactes
- Species: H. kasumba

Binomial name
- Harpactes kasumba (Raffles, 1822)

Audio
- Song recorded near Bangar, Brunei

= Red-naped trogon =

Species of bird

The red-naped trogon (Harpactes kasumba) is a species of bird in the family Trogonidae. It is found in Brunei, Indonesia, Malaysia, and Thailand. Its natural habitat is subtropical or tropical moist lowland forests. It is threatened by habitat loss.

== Name in different languages ==
- Latin - Harpactes kasumba
- French – Couroucou a masque rouge
- German – Rotnacken-Trogon
- Spanish – Trogon kasumba
- Dutch - Roodnektrogon

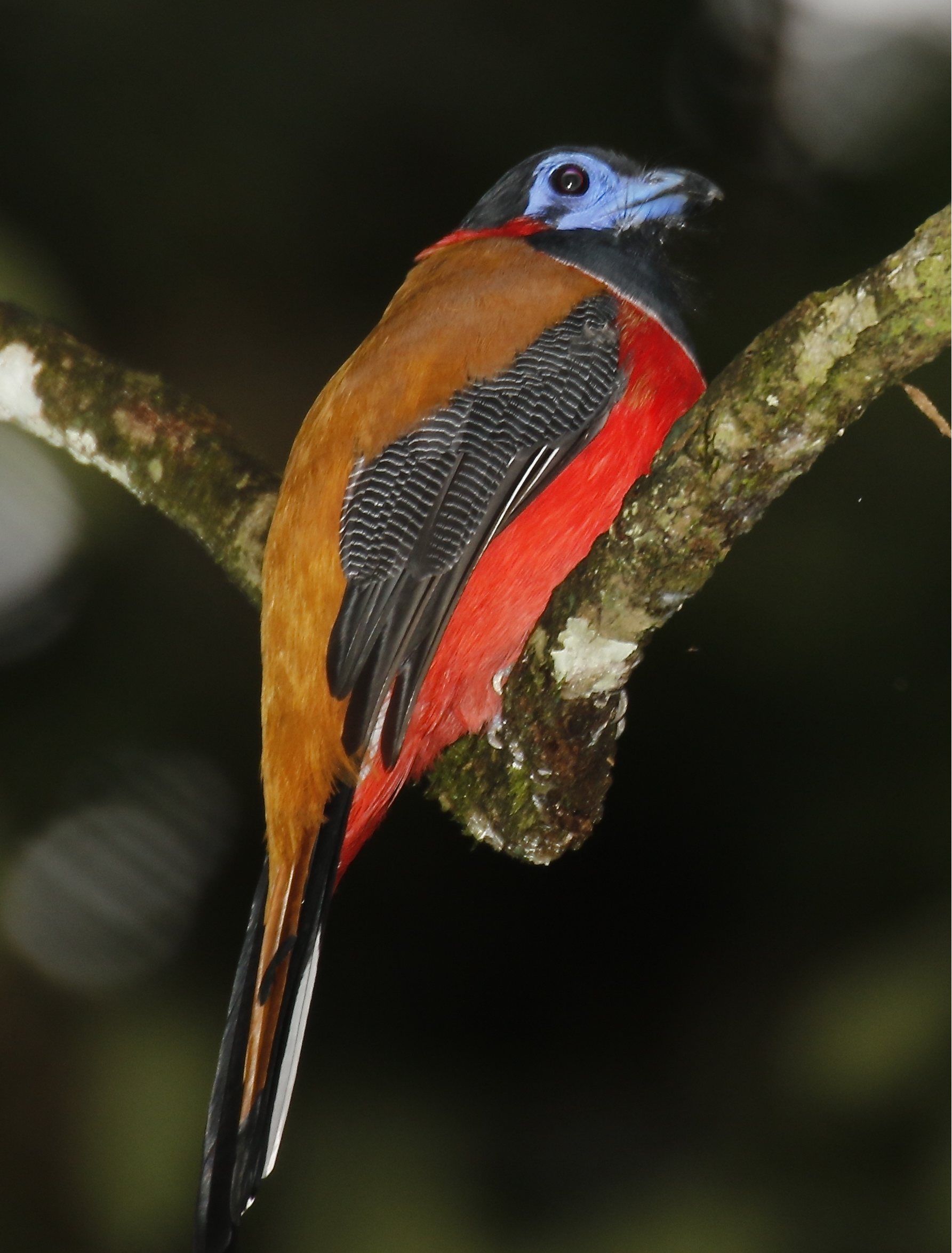
Borneo Rainforest Lodge - Danum Valley, Sabah, Borneo - Malaysia

== Life history ==
The red-naped trogon was discovered in 1822 by Sir Stamford Raffles, a military and British naturalist (1781-1826) best known for having founded Singapore in 1817.

== Morphology and flight ==
The red-naped trogon is a strongly sexually dimorphic species, with the females generally being duller than the males. The male red-naped trogon is physically defined by a black head and upper breast, blue bill and eye ring with a bright blue coloured face. He has yellow-brown upperparts and upper tail with black outlines, a white breast-line, bright red underparts and the under-tail is black and white. The most defining physical characteristic of the red-naped trogon is a band of bright red feathers around the back of the head, which gives the species its name. The females are blander in colour than the males, consisting of a grey-brown head and upper breast with yellow underparts.

Both the males and females grow in height up to 32 centimetres, or 12.5 inches. They have a life span of approximately 7.3 years. Their legs and feet are short and weak which makes them unable to walk, instead they are limited to the occasional shuffle along a branch. The ratio of leg muscle to body weight in all Trogonidae species is only 3%, the lowest known ratio of any bird. The arrangement of the toes on Trogonidae species feet is also unique among birds and are arranged with the third and fourth toes projecting forward and the first and second toes projecting backwards, an arrangement known as heterodactylous. Because of this arrangement, the red-naped trogon is unable to turn around on a branch if its wings are not aiding the movement.

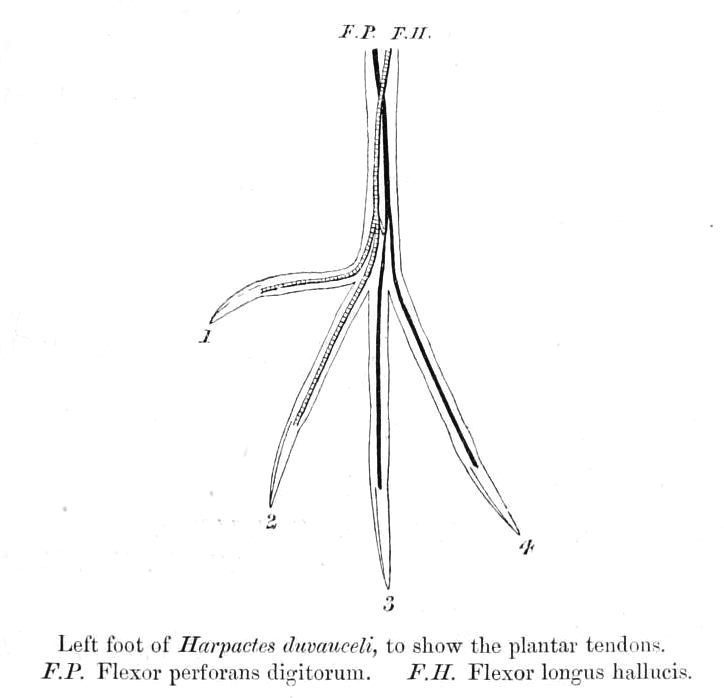
Arrangement of toes on Trogonidae species, known as heterodactylous

They have compact bodies, short wings and a long tail. Though the wings are short, they are quite strong, with the wing muscle ratio being approximately 22% of the body weight. In spite of their strength of flight, red-naped trogons do not fly great distances, generally flying no more than a few hundred metres at a time.

== Behaviour ==
Red-naped trogons are generally inactive outside of their regular feeding patterns. Because of this, birdwatchers and biologists have noted that "apart from their general beauty, they are notorious for their lack of other immediately engaging qualities". Their lack of activity has been considered a defence against predation. As with other Trogonidae species, red-naped trogons have been reported to shift along branches to keep their dull coloured backs turned towards observers, while their heads, which can rotate at 180 degrees like owls, are turned to keep watch on any potential predators. They are preyed upon by hawks and predatory mammals.

=== Diet and feeding ===
The red-naped trogon is mainly insectivorous, feasting on arthropods with a preference for stick insects and spiders. This regime is embellished with small lizards, fruits and seeds. The word "Trogon" is Greek for "to gnaw or eat" and refers to the structure and function of their beaks. The cutting edges of the maxilla and mandible are serrated which aids in securing live prey and fruit. These serrations, along with the decurved tip of the bill, are also useful in cutting food items into smaller pieces. Prey is mostly obtained on the wing, with the most commonly used foraging technique known as sally-glean flight. This is where the red-naped trogon flies from an observation perch to a target on another perch or in the foliage. Once in position, the red-naped trogon hovers over its target before snatching up they prey and returning to its original perch to consume the prey.

=== Call ===
The red-naped trogon's song voice is a slow, sad-sounding five to eight note "pau pau pau pau pau." Each short note slightly down slurred (1.5-1.2 kHz) and delivered at a rate of c.1 note/s. In addition to the territorial and breeding calls given by males and females during the breeding seasons, red-naped trogons have also been recorded as having aggression and alarm calls.

=== Breeding ===
The red-naped trogon is a territorial and monogamous species. The males repel other members of the same species, and even other nesting species, from around their nesting sites to ensure the safety of the nest. The males attract females by singing. Flocks of 3-12 individuals have been observed prior to, and sometimes during the breeding season, calling and chasing each other, however, the function of these flocks is unknown. Little is known about the nesting habits of the red-naped trogon, only that they are assumed to be cavity nesters. The only recorded account of a red-naped trogon nest was that of a brood found in July 1976 in Peninsular Malaysia. The nest was dug in a cavity of a rotten stump a few meters off the ground. They produce a clutch size of between one and three eggs. The incubation period lasts between 16 and 19 days. Upon hatching, the chicks are altricial, blind and naked, however, they do acquire feathers rapidly. The nesting period generally takes between 16 and 23 days to fledge.

== Distribution and population ==
The red-naped trogon is presumed to be a permanent resident or sedentary bird. Sedentary is "commonly used in the special sense of 'non-migratory,'" and resident is defined as "remaining throughout the year in the area under reference". At least 4,000 species of bird are regular migrants, which is approximately 40 percentage of the world's population of birds, however the red-napped trogon is not one of these. It does not migrate, but instead remains in the same location all year round. Red-naped trogons are confined to the Sundaic regions lowlands, also known as Sundaland, with a distribution size of 989,000 km^{2}. The Sundaic lowlands is a biogeographical region of South-eastern Asia which encompasses the Sunda shelf, Malay Peninsula of the Asian mainland, and the large islands of Borneo, Java and Sumatra, including their surrounding islands. The eastern boundary of the Sundaic region is the Wallace Line which separates the Indomalaya and Australasia ecotones.

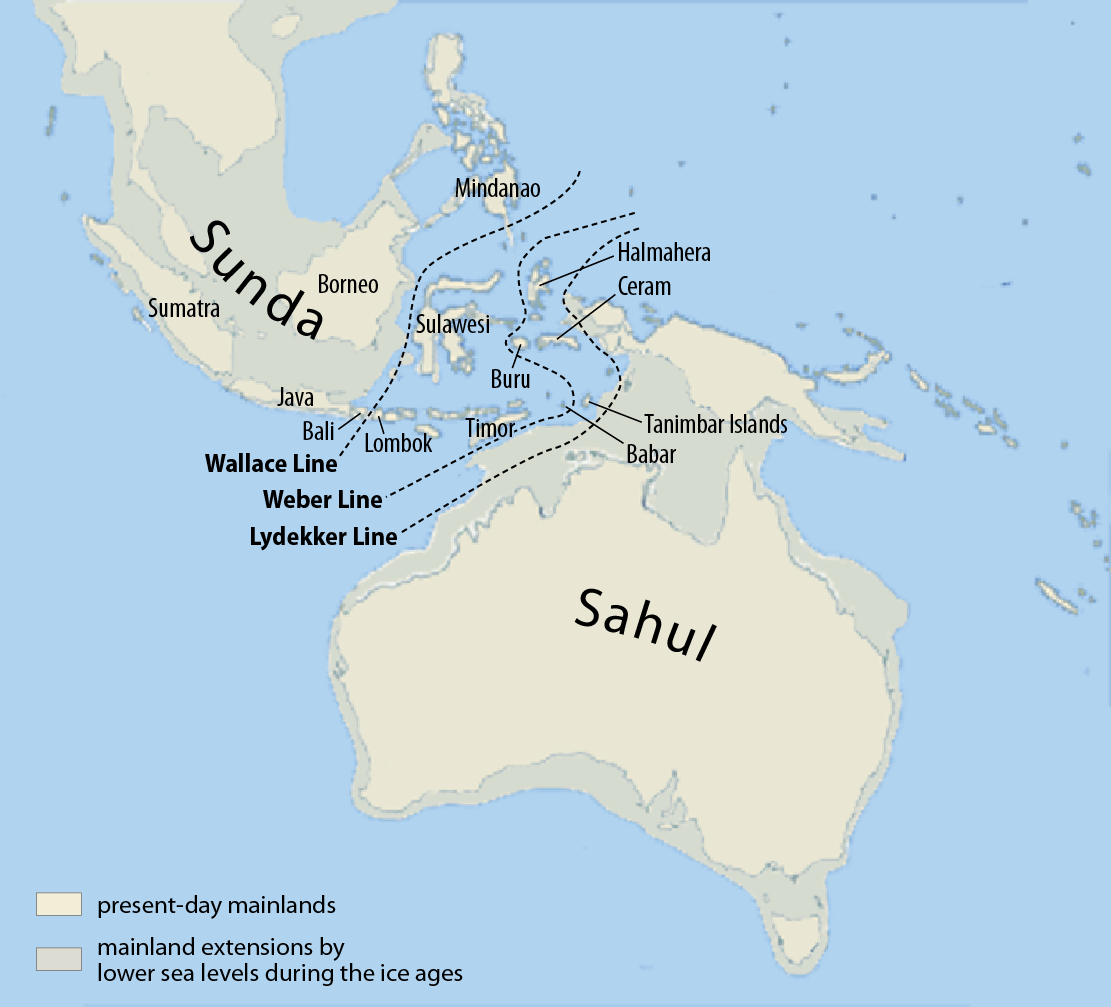
Map of Sundaland and Wallace line

The global population size has not been quantified, but the species is described as rare in Thailand, fairly common in Peninsular Malaysia and Sumatra, rather scarce in Sarawak and uncommon in Singapore, Indonesia, Sarawak, Sabah and Brunei. The current population trend shows a decline in the number of red-naped trogons at a moderately rapid rate, owing to habitat loss and degradation throughout its distribution range.

- Number of mature individuals = unknown
- Extreme population fluctuations = no
- Continuing decline of mature individuals = yes
- Population severely fragmented = no
- All individuals in one subpopulation = no
- Continuing decline in subpopulations = unknown
- Extreme population fluctuations in subpopulations = no

== Ecology ==
The red-naped trogon occurs mainly in primary, or lightly logged, lowland evergreen forests. They are most abundant below 600 metres, but have been located occasionally up to 1,200 metres in montane dipterocarp forest in Borneo. Another location that they have been recorded in is peat-swamp forest, as well as some logged areas, thick bamboo groves, coconut and cocoa plantations.

== Threats ==
High rates of deforestation in the Sundaic lowlands have been extremely rapid, owing to the escalation of illegal logging and land conversion that targets all remaining stands of valuable timber. Another impact has also been forest fires that have had a severely damaging effect. Because of these threats, the red-naped trogon has been ranked by Birdlife as a near threatened species (NT). IUCN Red List History:

- 2012= Near Threatened
- 2008= Near Threatened
- 2004= Near Threatened
- 2000= Low Risk/Near Threatened
- 1994= Lower Risk/Least Concern
- 1988= Lower Risk/Least concern

== Conservation actions ==
There are currently no targeted conservation actions for this species, however, conservation actions have been proposed to conduct ecological studies to improve the understanding of the red-naped trogon's habitat requirements. In particular, the studies would aim to determine the levels of tolerance of secondary habitats. Other conservation actions to be looked into are the improvement of management of protect areas within the species range, to increase the area of suitable habitat and the implement measures to ensure the protection of the suitable habitat from illegal activities.
