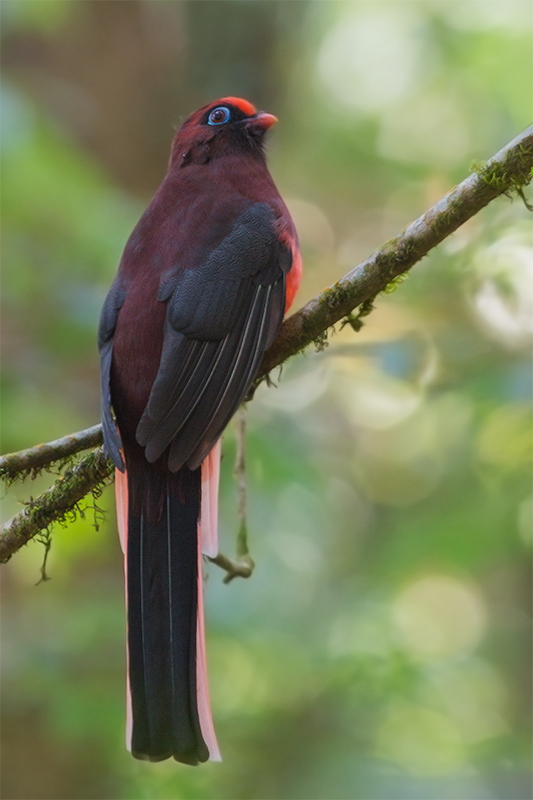
- Male in Eaglenest Wildlife Sanctuary

Conservation status
- Least Concern (IUCN 3.1)

Scientific classification
- Kingdom: Animalia
- Phylum: Chordata
- Class: Aves
- Order: Trogoniformes
- Family: Trogonidae
- Genus: Harpactes
- Species: H. wardi

Binomial name
- Harpactes wardi (Kinnear, 1927)

= Ward's trogon =

Species of bird

Ward's trogon (Harpactes wardi) is a species of bird in the family Trogonidae. Its range includes the northeastern parts of the Indian subcontinent stretching eastwards to Southeast Asia. It is found in Bhutan, India, Tibet, and Myanmar. It also has a disjunct population in northern Vietnam, but there are no recent records from there. Its natural habitats are temperate forests and subtropical or tropical moist lowland forests. It is threatened by habitat loss.

Its common name and Latin binomial commemorate the English botanist and explorer Francis Kingdon-Ward.

== Description ==
Ward's trogon measures 35 to 38 cm (14–15 in) in length and weighs 115–120 g (4.1–4.2 oz). The male have a pink-red breast, belly, undertail and forehead and the chest, back and wings and uppertail are dark slate with a maroon wash. The tip of the bill is deep red. The plumage of the female matches the male but the red is replaced with yellow and the dark parts are dark olive. The female's beak tip is yellow, and both sexes have a blue ring around the eye.

== Distribution and habitat ==
Ward's trogon ranges from Bhutan and Arunachal in North Eastern India and into northern and eastern Myanmar and southern China (in western Yunnan). A disjunct population was reported to be common in Fan Si Pan in Vietnam in 1939, but there are no modern records of that species there. The species is generally montane, usually occurring between 1,500–3,200 m (4,900–10,500 ft) but occasionally coming down as low as 300 m (980 ft). There is some evidence that it moves to lower altitudes in winter.

The preferred habitat of Ward's trogon is subtropical hill forest dominated by Quercus and Castanopsis and temperate broadleaf evergreen forest. Within these forests it is found in the understory, undergrowth and within bamboo stands.

This species was first categorized as Vulnerable by the IUCN from 1994 - 2000, and was subsequently downlisted to Near Threatened from 2000 - 2023. As of 2023, the species is considered Least Concern due to its large range, and slow rate of population decline.

== Behaviour ==
Little is known about the behaviour of Ward's trogon. It feeds on insects, including moths, stick-insects, grasshoppers and bugs, as well as large seeds. Its nests have not been found or described, but birds in breeding condition have been found in March and April.
