= Violaceous trogon =

Violaceous trogon has been split into the following species:

- Guianan trogon, Trogon violaceus
- Gartered trogon, Trogon caligatus
- Amazonian trogon, Trogon ramonianus
