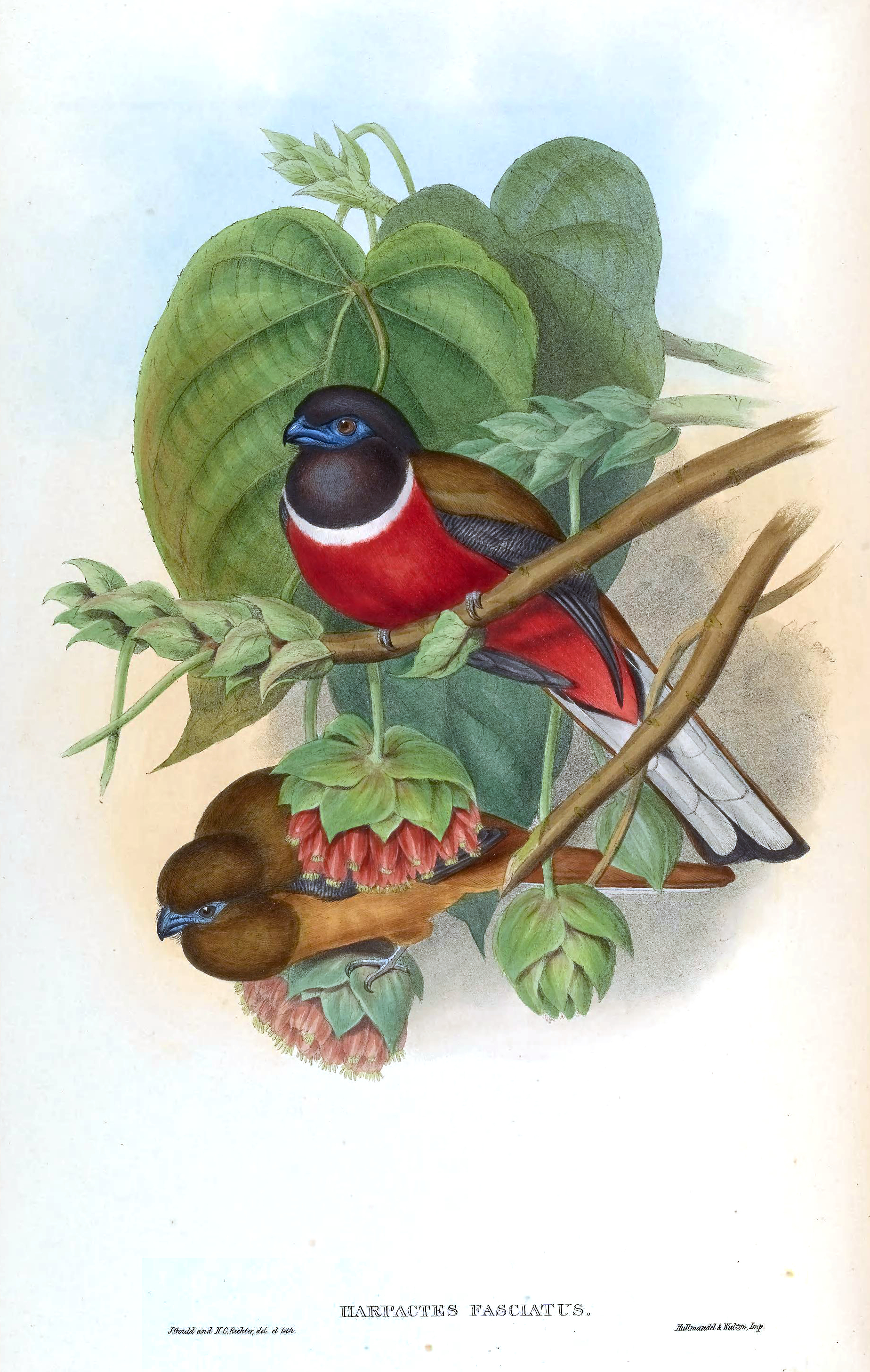
- Malabar trogon, Harpactes fasciatus

Scientific classification
- Kingdom: Animalia
- Phylum: Chordata
- Class: Aves
- Order: Trogoniformes
- Family: Trogonidae
- Genus: Harpactes; Swainson, 1833

Type species
- Trogon malabaricus Gould, 1834

Synonyms
- Duvaucelius

= Harpactes =

Genus of birds

Harpactes is a genus of birds in the family Trogonidae found in forests in South and Southeast Asia, extending into southernmost China. They are strongly sexually dimorphic, with females generally being duller than males. Their back is brownish, the tail is partially white (best visible from below), and males of most species have red underparts. They feed on arthropods, small lizards and fruit.

== Taxonomy ==
The genus Harpactes was introduced in 1833 by the English zoologist William Swainson. He did not specify a type species but in 1840 by the English zoologist George Gray designated the type as Trogon malabaricus Gould, 1834. This taxon is now considered as a subspecies of Harpactes fasciatus Pennant, 1769, the Malabar trogon. The genus name is from Ancient Greek ἁρπακτης/harpaktēs meaning "robber".

Two species, cinnamon-rumped and scarlet-rumped trogons, were previously classified in a separate genus, Duvaucelius, and a 2010 study found that these two were closely related and formed a separate clade from all of the other Harpactes trogons (except orange-breasted trogon, which forms a third group), but recommended that all three groups should be treated as congeneric. This same study also found that the genus Apalharpactes, containing two species sometimes included in Harpactes, is actually distantly related and thus a valid genus.

== Species ==
The genus contains ten species.

Male	Female	Common name	Scientific name	Distribution
		Malabar trogon	Harpactes fasciatus	India and Sri Lanka
		Red-naped trogon	Harpactes kasumba	Malay Peninsula, Sumatra and Borneo
		Diard's trogon	Harpactes diardii	Malay Peninsula, Sumatra and Borneo
		Philippine trogon	Harpactes ardens	Philippines (except West Visayas, Palawan group and Sulu Archipelago)
		Whitehead's trogon	Harpactes whiteheadi	montane north Borneo
		Cinnamon-rumped trogon	Harpactes orrhophaeus	Malay Peninsula, Sumatra and Borneo
		Scarlet-rumped trogon	Harpactes duvaucelii	Malay Peninsula, Sumatra, Batu Islands (west of central Sumatra), Riau Islands (east of central Sumatra), Bangka Island and Belitung (east of south Sumatra), Natuna Islands (northwest of Borneo) and Borneo
		Orange-breasted trogon	Harpactes oreskios	southeast Asia and Greater Sundas
		Red-headed trogon	Harpactes erythrocephalus	Himalayas and south China to Sumatra
		Ward's trogon	Harpactes wardi	northeast India to north Vietnam
