= Eotrogon =

Eotrogon Temporal range: Ypresian

Scientific classification
- Kingdom: Animalia
- Phylum: Chordata
- Class: Aves
- Order: Trogoniformes
- Family: Trogonidae
- Genus: Eotrogon
- Species: E. stenorhynchus

Binomial name
- Eotrogon stenorhynchus Mayr et al., 2023

Extinct genus of trogon

Eotrogon is an extinct genus of trogon that inhabited England during the Ypresian stage of the Eocene epoch. It is a monotypic genus that contains the species E. stenorhynchus.
