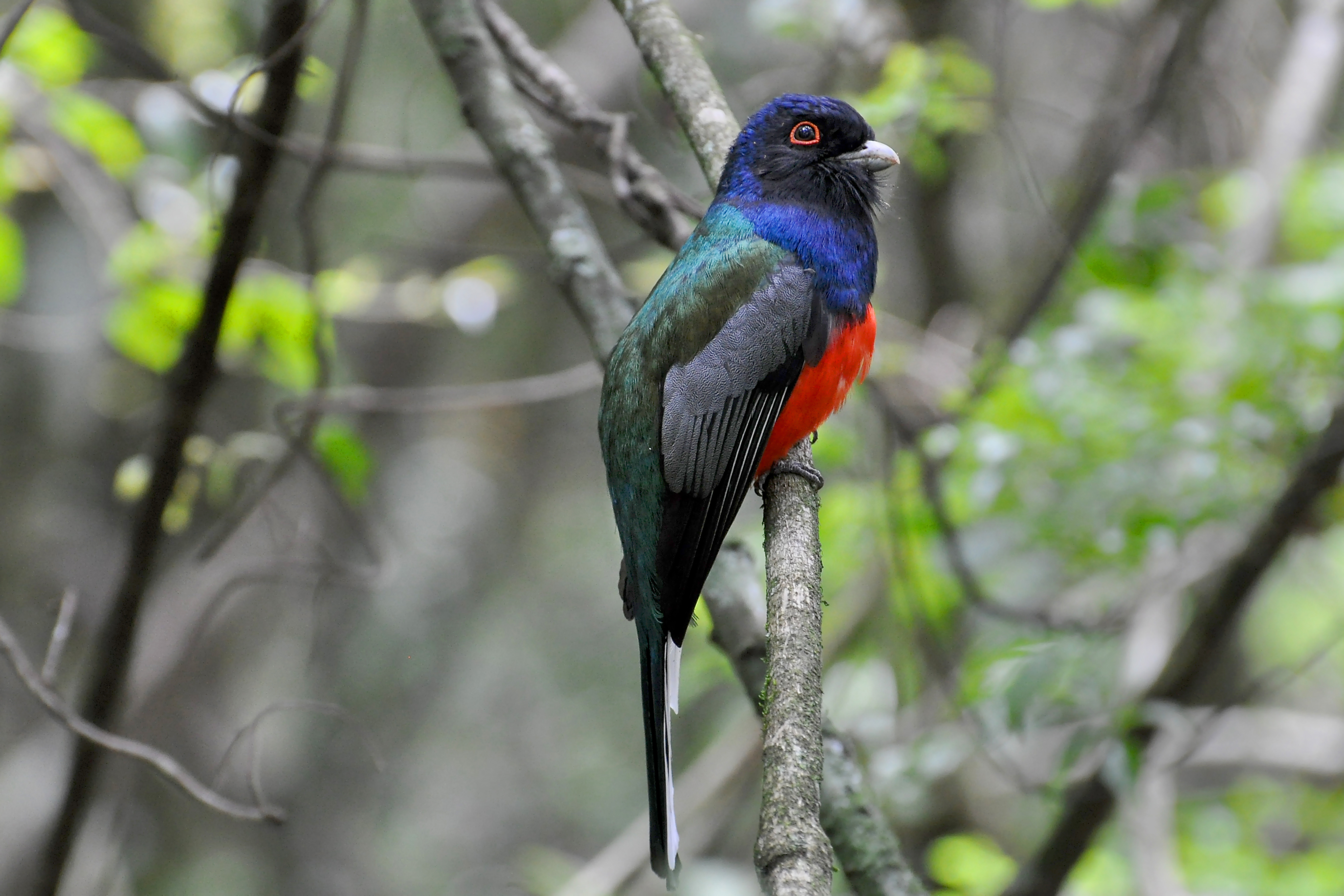
- male Trogon s. surrucura

Conservation status
- Least Concern (IUCN 3.1)

Scientific classification
- Domain: Eukaryota
- Kingdom: Animalia
- Phylum: Chordata
- Class: Aves
- Order: Trogoniformes
- Family: Trogonidae
- Genus: Trogon
- Species: T. surrucura

Binomial name
- Trogon surrucura Vieillot, 1817

= Surucua trogon =

Species of bird

The Surucua trogon (Trogon surrucura) is a species of bird in the family Trogonidae, the quetzals and trogons. It is found in Argentina, Brazil, Paraguay, and Uruguay.

== Taxonomy and systematics ==
The International Ornithological Committee (IOC) and the Clements taxonomy recognize two subspecies of Surucua trogon, the nominate T. s. surrucura and T. s. aurantius. BirdLife International's Handbook of the Birds of the World (HBW) treats these two forms as separate species, the "southern" and "northern" Surucua trogons respectively.

== Description ==
The nominate subspecies T. s. surrucura is 26 to 28 cm (10 to 11 in) long and weighs 56.3 to 78 g (2.0 to 2.8 oz). The male has a blackish face and throat with an orange ring around the eye. The crown, neck, and breast are royal blue and the back a coppery green that transitions to turquoise-green on the upperside of the tail. The folded wing has fine vermiculation that looks gray at a distance. The belly is pinkish red and the flanks gray. The underside of the tail is white with a black bar across the end. The female is mostly gray with the red of the belly beginning lower. Instead of the orange ring around the eye there are small white spots before and after it. The underside of the tail has a black and white pattern. T. s. aurantius is about 28 cm (11 in) long. The male differs from the nominate by having a yellow eye ring and an orange belly. The female's belly is yellowish white to orange-yellow.

== Distribution and habitat ==
The nominate subspecies of Surucua trogon is found from eastern Paraguay and northeastern Argentina east into Uruguay and in Brazil as far north as southeastern Tocantins. T. s. aurantius has a more restricted range in east central and eastern Brazil from Bahia south to São Paulo state. They inhabit the mid levels of primary and well-developed secondary forest and semideciduous woodland. T. s. aurantius often associates with bamboo. T. s. surrucura occurs as high as 1,150 m (3,800 ft) in Bahia, 1,550 m (5,100 ft) in Minas Gerais, and higher still in Rio de Janeiro state. T. s. aurantius occurs up to about 2,000 m (6,600 ft).

== Behavior ==
=== Migration ===
The more northerly T. s. aurantius appears to be a year round resident in its range. T. s. surrucura is mostly sedentary but the southernmost birds move north for the austral winter.

=== Feeding ===
The Surucua trogon's diet includes a wide variety of insects, both adults and larva, and also fruits and occasionally flowers. It sometimes joins mixed-species foraging flocks.

=== Breeding ===
The Surucua trogon's breeding season spans from September to December and possibly into January. The nest is a cavity in a decayed tree or an arboreal termite nest. The one described clutch contained three eggs.

=== Vocalization ===
The Surucua trogon's song is "an ascending sequence of moderately high-pitched, 14–20 full 'diu' or 'kwa' notes, which increase slightly in amplitude". It makes a "kiarr" warning call.

== Status ==
The IUCN follows HBW taxonomy and so treats the southern and northern Surucua trogons separately. It assesses both as being of Least Concern. The population of neither has been quantified but both are believed to be decreasing. Both subspecies are found in several protected areas but outside them are known to be affected by forest fragmentation.
