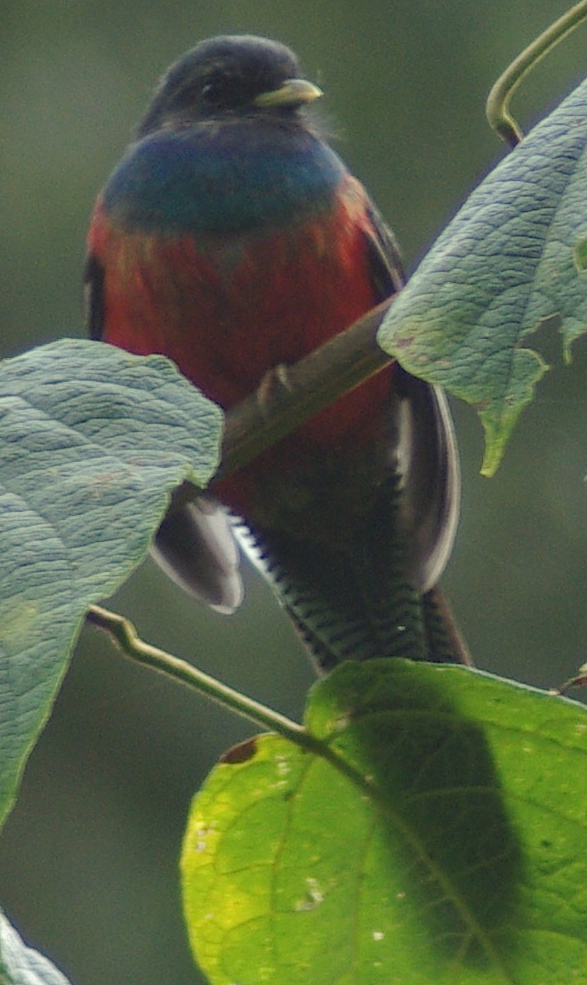
- Bar-tailed trogon Apaloderma vittatum

Scientific classification
- Kingdom: Animalia
- Phylum: Chordata
- Class: Aves
- Order: Trogoniformes
- Family: Trogonidae
- Genus: Apaloderma; Swainson, 1833

Type species
- Trogon narina Stephens, 1815

Species
- 3, see text

= Apaloderma =

Genus of birds

Apaloderma is a genus of birds in the family Trogonidae, native from tropical Africa south to southern Africa.

The name is a compound word composed of two Greek words, hapalos, meaning "delicate", and derma, meaning "skin". Established by William Swainson in 1833, the genus contains the following species:

Image	Scientific name	Common name	Distribution
	Apaloderma narina (Stephens, JF, 1815)	Narina trogon	Sierra Leone to Ethiopia, and east Africa to eastern and southern South Africa
	Apaloderma aequatoriale Sharpe, RB, 1901	Bare-cheeked trogon	Cameroon, Central African Republic, Republic of the Congo, Democratic Republic of the Congo, Equatorial Guinea, Gabon, and Nigeria
	Apaloderma vittatum Shelley, GE, 1882	Bar-tailed trogon	Angola, Burundi, Cameroon, DRC, Equatorial Guinea, Kenya, Malawi, Mozambique, Nigeria, Rwanda, Tanzania, Uganda, and Zambia
