= List of Trogoniformes by population =

This is a list of Trogoniformes species by global population. While numbers are estimates, they have been made by the experts in their fields. For more information on how these estimates were ascertained, see Wikipedia's articles on population biology and population ecology.

This list is not comprehensive, as not all Trogoniformes have had their numbers quantified.

== Species by global population ==
Common name	Binomial name	Population	Status	Trend	Notes	Image
Baird's trogon	Trogon bairdii	1,000 – 4,000	NT	▼	Best estimate for population of mature individuals is 4,000. Total population expected to be less than 10,000 individuals.	
Javan trogon	Apalharpactes reinwardtii	2,500 – 9,999	VU	▼	Global population is suspected to have been previously underestimated.	
Eared quetzal	Euptilotis neoxenus	20,000 – 49,999	LC	▼		
Lattice-tailed trogon	Trogon clathratus	20,000 – 49,999	LC	▼		
Resplendent quetzal	Pharomachrus mocinno	50,000 – 499,999	NT	▼		
Slaty-tailed trogon	Trogon massena	50,000 – 499,999	LC	▼		
Black-headed trogon	Trogon melanocephalus	50,000 – 499,999	LC	▼		
Golden-headed quetzal	Pharomachrus auriceps	50,000 – 499,999	LC	▼		
Citreoline trogon	Trogon citreolus	50,000 – 499,999	LC	Steady		
Mountain trogon	Trogon mexicanus	50,000 – 499,999	LC	▼		
Black-throated trogon (Amazonian black-throated trogon)	Trogon rufus	500,000 – 4,999,999	LC	▼	IOC taxonomic classifications split three additional species from this bird on the basis of genetic divergence: Northern, Atlantic, and Choco black-throated trogon. IUCN/BirdLife International maintain these are subspecies of black-throated trogon.	
White-tailed trogon	Trogon chionurus	500,000 – 4,999,999	LC	▼		
Collared trogon	Trogon collaris	5,000,000 – 49,999,999	LC	▼		
Black-tailed trogon	Trogon melanurus	5,000,000 – 49,999,999	LC	▼		

== See also ==
- Lists of birds by population
- Lists of organisms by population
