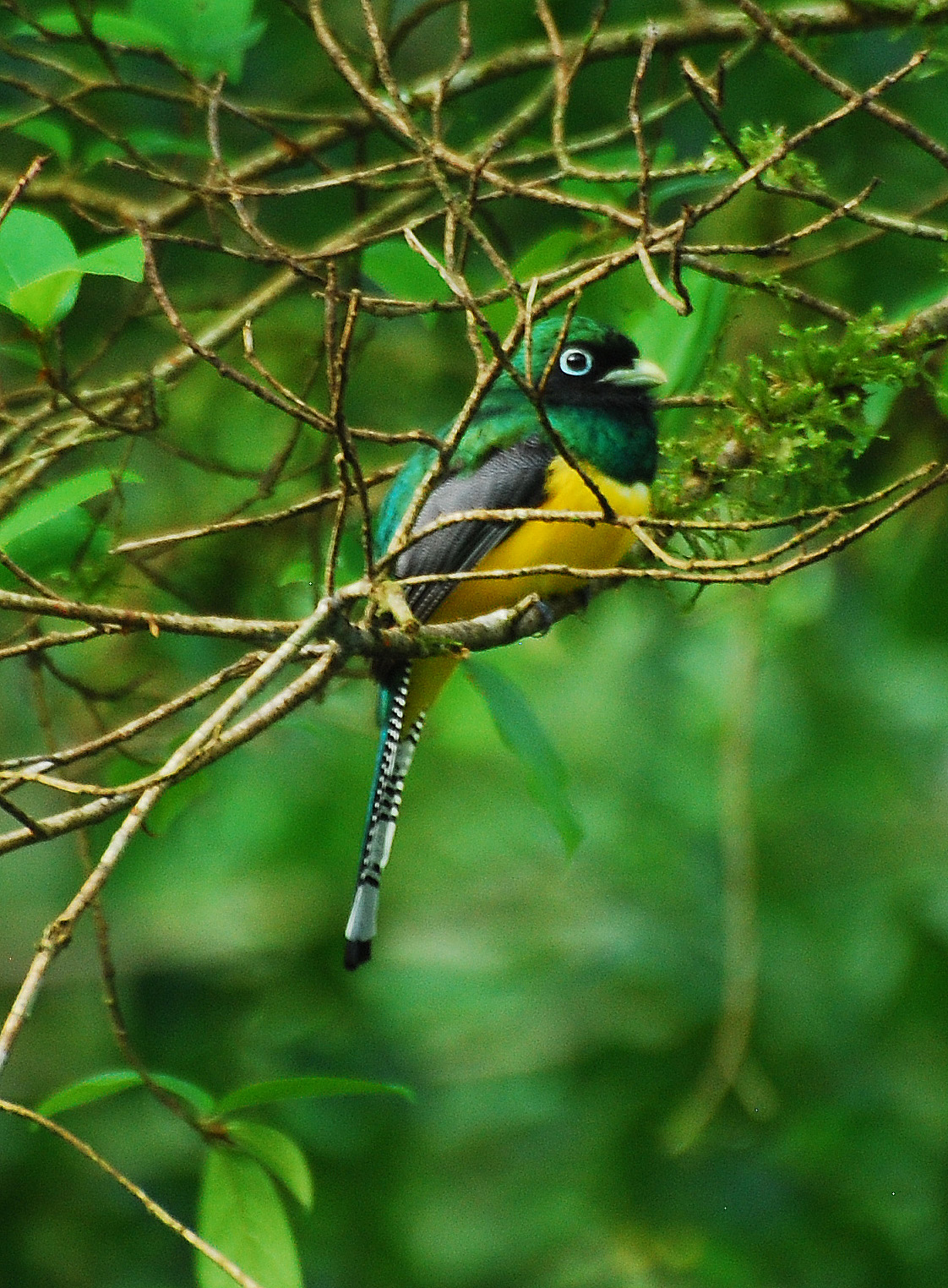
- A closely-related black-throated trogon variant showing the shared characteristic yellow underparts and barred tail markers

Conservation status
- Critically Endangered (IUCN 3.1)

Scientific classification
- Kingdom: Animalia
- Phylum: Chordata
- Class: Aves
- Order: Trogoniformes
- Family: Trogonidae
- Genus: Trogon
- Species: T. muriciensis

Binomial name
- Trogon muriciensis Dickens, Bitton, Bravo & Silveira, 2021

= Alagoas black-throated trogon =

Species of bird in Brazil

The Alagoas black-throated trogon (Trogon muriciensis) is a bird in the family Trogonidae, the trogons and quetzals. It was described in 2021. It is endemic to the Estação Ecológica de Murici in the Brazilian state of Alagoas. It is sometimes considered a subspecies of the Atlantic black-throated trogon (Trogon chrysochloros)

== Taxonomy and systematics ==
The Alagoas black-throated trogon was described in 2021 following in-depth research of the Trogon rufus complex, which also includes the Choco black-throated trogon (Trogon cupreicauda), Northern black-throated trogon (Trogon tenellus), and the Atlantic black-throated trogon (Trogon chrysochloros). Researchers compared 906 museum specimens and used an integrative approach that combined morphological analysis, vocalization recordings, and genetic sequencing. This study involved five reproductively isolated populations within what had previously been considered a single species. Among these, the population found in Alagoas showed a distinct mixture of traits such as unique plumage patterns, vocalizations, and mitochondrial DNA sequences that validated its classification as a new species, Trogon muriciensis.

== Description ==
Like most trogons, the Alagoas black-throated has distinctive male and female plumages with soft colorful feathers. Adult males have a vibrant green head, a yellow belly, and a strong looking black throat. One of the most unique traits of this species is the bright blue ring bordering its eyes. The males wings and tail have a barred pattern, which is less evident in females. The species is considered to look like an intermediate between T. chrysochloros and T. rufus.

== Distribution and habitat ==
The Alagoas black-throated trogon is confined to the Estação Ecológica de Murici in the Alagoas state, at just over 500 m (1,600 ft) elevation, where it occurs in mid-levels of the montane Atlantic Forest. The species is found in just 30 km^{2} (12 sq mi) of forest due to large scale deforestation in the area.

== Conservation ==
The Alagoas black-throated trogon is currently listed as Critically Endangered due to its extremely restricted distribution and the ongoing threats and problems involving its habitat. The Atlantic Forest struggles to keep up with its deforestation, agricultural expansion, and urban developments, which all contribute to the overall loss of its habitat. Efforts are heavily requested to revive the lasting forest fragments in Murici in order to increase the population of the Alagoas black-throated trogon. These efforts may include habitat restoration, stricter enforcement of environmental protections, and increased public awareness of the species ongoing critical endangerment.
