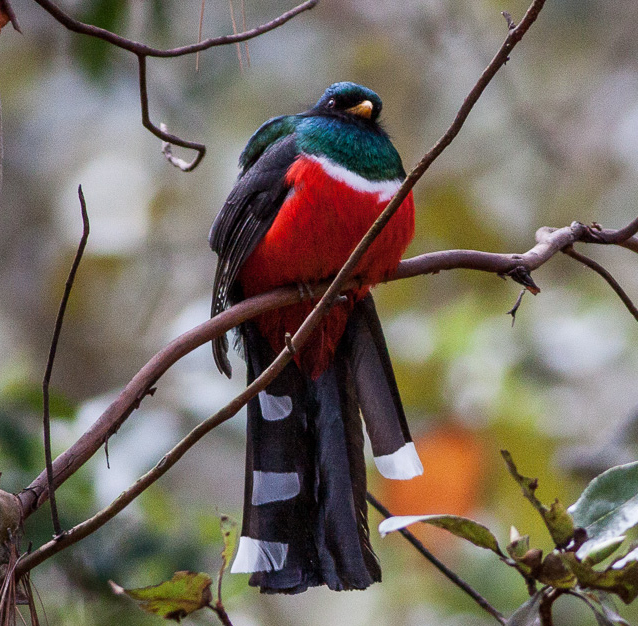
- Male

Conservation status
- Least Concern (IUCN 3.1)

Scientific classification
- Kingdom: Animalia
- Phylum: Chordata
- Class: Aves
- Order: Trogoniformes
- Family: Trogonidae
- Genus: Trogon
- Species: T. mexicanus

Binomial name
- Trogon mexicanus Swainson, 1827

Synonyms
- Trogon glocitans Lichtenstein, 1830; Trogon morgani Gould, 1838; Trogonurus mexicanus Bonaparte, 1854

= Mountain trogon =

Species of bird

The mountain trogon (Trogon mexicanus), also known as the Mexican trogon, is a species of bird in the family Trogonidae. First described by William Swainson in 1827, it is resident in Guatemala, Honduras, and Mexico and has occurred in El Salvador as a vagrant. Like all trogons, the mountain trogon is sexually dimorphic. The male is metallic green on the crown, nape, upperparts and chest, the latter separated from its bright red belly and vent by a narrow band of white. The female is warm brown on the head, upperparts and chest, separated from its paler brown lower chest and red belly and vent by a narrow white band.

Its natural habitat is subtropical and tropical moist montane forests. It prefers pine-evergreen and pine-oak woodland between 3,000 and 10,000 ft (914 and 3,048 m) in elevation. Unlike some rarer trogons, this species shows some adaptability to human land use and has utilized coffee plantations with suitable shade trees like oaks.

== Taxonomy ==
When he first described the mountain trogon in 1827 from a specimen collected in Temascáltepec, Mexico, William Swainson gave the species its current scientific name. Most ornithologists have agreed with this assignment, though Charles Lucien Bonaparte assigned it to the genus Trogonurus, and several other ornithologists described it again later under other names. It has three subspecies:

- T. m. clarus was described by Ludlow Griscom in 1932.
- T. m. lutescens was also described by Griscom in 1932.
- T. m. mexicanus was described by Swainson in 1827.

DNA studies have shown that the mountain trogon is part of the "Elegant" sub-clade of the genus Trogon—along with the elegant trogon, the collared trogon, the black-throated trogons (Amazonian, Atlantic, choco, and northern) and the masked trogon—but have not revealed which species are its closest relatives.

The genus name Trogon is a Greek word meaning "grawing" or "nibbling". This may be a reference to the way trogons gnaw into rotting trees to make their nest holes. The species name mexicanus means "Mexico", a reference to where the first specimen was collected.

== Description ==
The mountain trogon measures 11.5–12.5 in (29–31.5 cm) in length. It weighs between 61.5 and 85 g (2.2 and 3.0 oz), with a mean of 71 g (2.5 oz). Like all trogons, it is sexually dimorphic. The adult male is green on the crown, nape and upperparts; the upper side of its tail is bluish-green, with black tips to the rectrices. His face and throat are blackish, with an orange-red orbital ring and a bright yellow bill. He is green on the chest and red on the belly and undertail; the two colors are separated by a narrow band of white. The underside of his tail is black with three large white blocks created by white tips to the outer rectrices. His primaries are blackish, with black and white vermiculations on the wing coverts. The female is warm brown on her head and upperparts; her tail is rufous-brown on the upperside, with black tips to the rectrices. She has a small white crescent in front of her eye and a bold white crescent behind her eye. Her bill is dark above. Her chest is warm brown, separated from her brown lower chest and red belly by a narrow band of white. Her undertail is black and white; the outer webs of the rectrices are barred black and white, while the inner webs are black, broadly tipped with white. Her primaries are blackish with white outer webs, which form white streaks along her folded wing. Her wing coverts are pale brown, with dusky vermiculations.

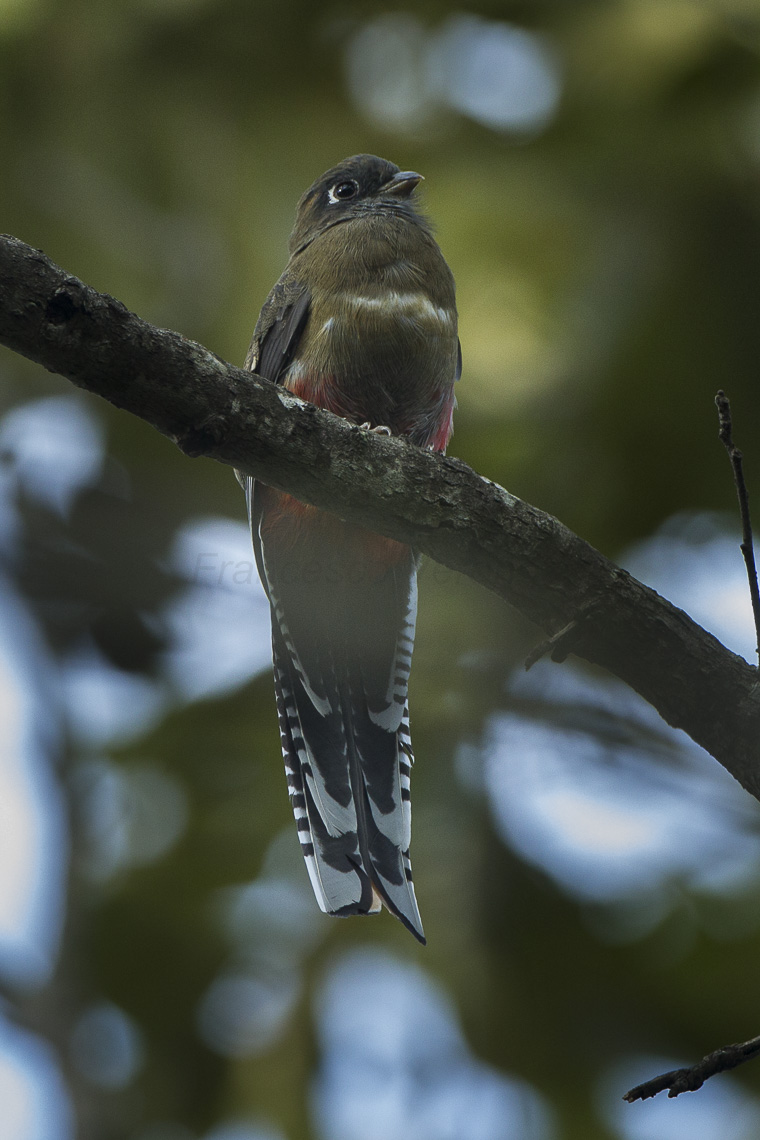
The female is less colorful than the male.

=== Similar species ===
There are several species with which the mountain trogon might be confused; they differ primarily in the color and patterning on their tails. The male elegant trogon's tail is copper-colored (rather than green) above and finely vermiculated black and white (rather than all black) below, while the female has a white patch behind and below her eye. The male collared trogon is golden-green on the back and uppertail, and its undertail is black with narrow white barring. The female collared trogon's tail is grayish below with a narrow dark bar at the tip of each rectrice.

== Range and habitat ==
The mountain trogon is found in the highlands of Mexico, Guatemala and Honduras. Although it was formerly recorded as a resident in El Salvador, the area where it was found was ceded to Honduras in 1992 and it now occurs in El Salvador only as a vagrant. It also occurs in Nicaragua, though the origin of these birds is uncertain. The ornithological collection at Vassar College contains a mountain trogon that was purportedly shot in Texas, but the species is not on the list of accepted North American birds.

Found at elevations ranging from 3,000 to 10,000 ft (910 to 3,050 m), the mountain trogon prefers pine or pine-oak woodlands and cloud forest.

== Behavior ==
The mountain trogon may associate with mixed species flocks. It joins such flocks sporadically and in small numbers, but is an active member of the flock, moving in the upper and middle levels of the forest, when it is present.

=== Food and feeding ===
The mountain trogon eats insects and small fruits, which it catches or plucks while on the wing.

=== Breeding ===
Like all trogons, the mountain trogon is a cavity nester. It is both a primary and secondary cavity nester, meaning that it both excavates its own nest cavities, and uses those cavities already excavated by another species. When it excavates its own nest, it uses its beak to gnaw a hole in rotting wood, either in a decaying stump or branch. The cavity is typically less than 4 ft (1.2 m) off the ground, but occasionally as high as 12 ft (3.7 m). When it uses a cavity made by another species, it typically uses those made by large woodpeckers. The female lays two white eggs, which both parents incubate, though the female does far longer stints than the male. The eggs hatch after 19 days.

=== Voice ===
The mountain trogon has several vocalizations. If alarmed, it gives a sharp, low-pitched call variously transcribed as "cut" or "tuck". In flight, it gives a quick, low-pitched call transcribed as "cut-a-cut-cut". When perched, it makes a slow, repetitive "cowh" or a "tucka-tucka-tucka". Young mountain trogons make quiet hissing calls when food begging, and when approached by potential predators.

== Conservation and threats ==
Because of its large range and large population, estimated to number between 50,000 and 499,999 individuals, the mountain trogon is rated as a species of least concern by the International Union for Conservation of Nature. Its population appears to be stable.
