= Black-throated trogon =

Black-throated trogon was a common name for birds in a species complex, which included birds now known as:

- Northern black-throated trogon, Trogon tenellus
- Choco black-throated trogon, Trogon cupreicauda
- Amazonian black-throated trogon, Trogon rufus
- Atlantic black-throated trogon, Trogon chrysochloros
