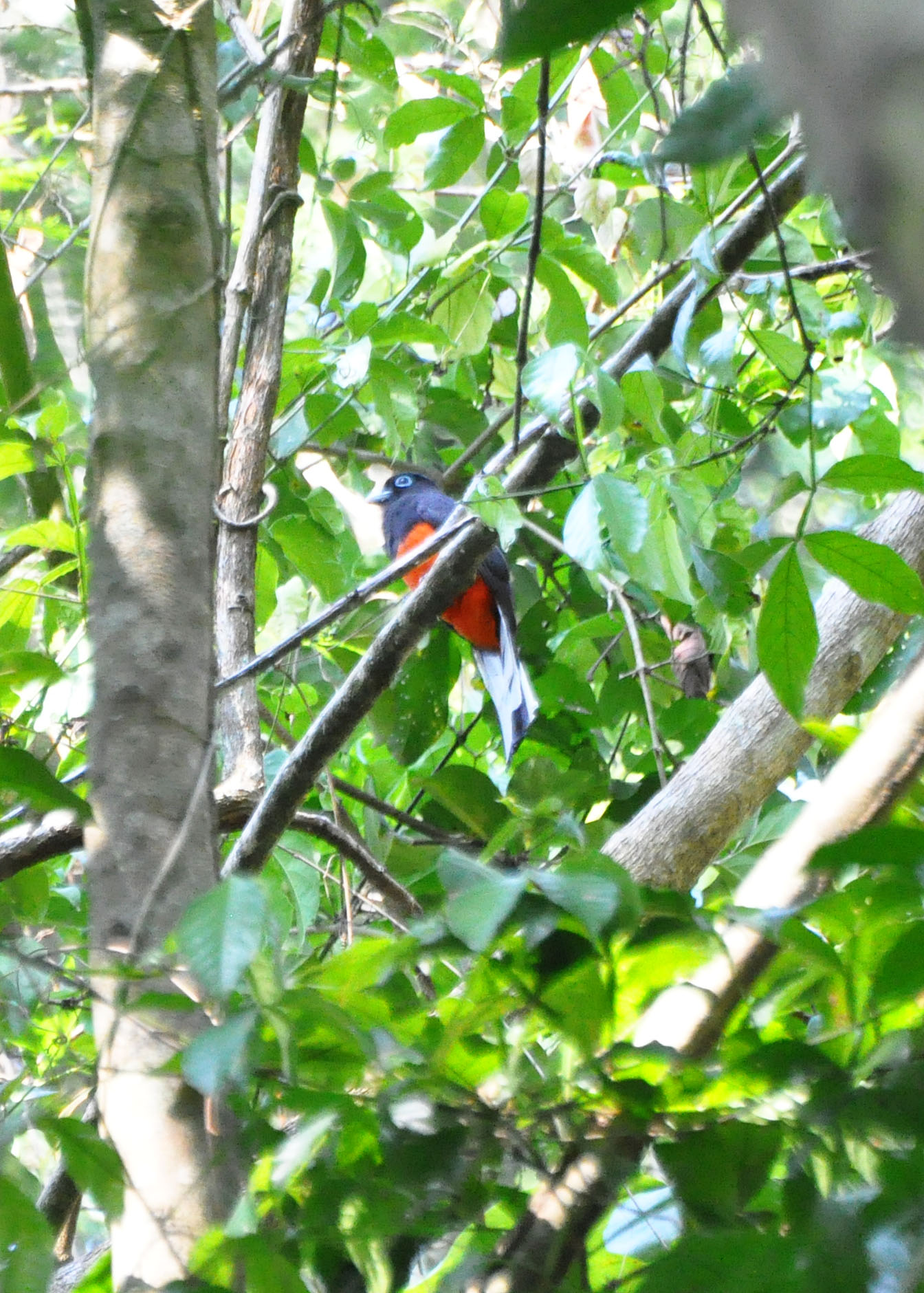

Conservation status
- Near Threatened (IUCN 3.1)

Scientific classification
- Kingdom: Animalia
- Phylum: Chordata
- Class: Aves
- Order: Trogoniformes
- Family: Trogonidae
- Genus: Trogon
- Species: T. bairdii

Binomial name
- Trogon bairdii Lawrence, 1868

= Baird's trogon =

Species of bird

Baird's trogon (Trogon bairdii) is a bird species belonging to the family Trogonidae, which includes quetzals and trogons. It is native to Costa Rica and Panama. The species is named in honor of Spencer Fullerton Baird, a renowned naturalist of the 19th century who served as the first curator of the Smithsonian Institution.

== Taxonomy and systematics ==
Baird's trogon is sometimes treated as conspecific with one or both of green-backed trogon (T. viridis) and white-tailed trogon (T. chionurus). They do form a sister group with black-headed trogon (T. melanocephalus) and citreoline trogon (T. citreolus). Baird's trogon is monotypic.

== Description ==
Baird's trogon is 25 to 28 cm (9.8 to 11.0 in) long and weighs about 95 g (3.4 oz). The male's head and most of the breast are bluish black and the rest of the underparts a rich bright red. It has a stout light blue bill and ring around the eye. The upperparts are metallic blue-green and the wings mostly blackish with some white on the primary feathers. The upper side of the tail feathers are greenish- to violet-blue with black tips. Their underside is white with black tips. The female replaces the blue and green with dark slate above and a paler gray in the throat and breast. The underparts have less red and the underside of the tail is barred with black and white.

== Distribution and habitat ==
Baird's trogon is found on the Pacific slope of Costa Rica from approximately the Tárcoles River south just into western Panama's Chiriquí Province. It primarily inhabits the interior canopy of humid rainforest but also occurs at its edges, in tall secondary forest, and in shady semi-open woodland. In elevation it ranges from sea level to 1,200 m (3,900 ft).

== Behavior ==
=== Feeding ===
Baird's trogon forages by sallying to take fruits and insects from foliage and will also take prey from the ground. Small vertebrates are a minor part of its diet.

=== Breeding ===
Baird's trogon breeds between April and August. They nest in a cavity in the decaying trunk of a dead tree. The clutch size is two to three eggs; incubation takes 16 to 17 days, and fledging takes about 25 days from hatching.

=== Vocalization ===
The song of Baird's trogon is a "series of barking notes, first level, then accelerating and falling abruptly, sometimes terminating with several widely spaced notes on [a] lower pitch". It also makes a "sharp cackle" when bothered.

== Status ==
The IUCN originally assessed Baird's trogon in 1988 as Threatened, but since 2004 has rated it Near Threatened. It has a small range and is losing habitat to deforestation. It is mostly restricted to protected areas in Costa Rica and is rare in Panama, with few records in the 2000s.
