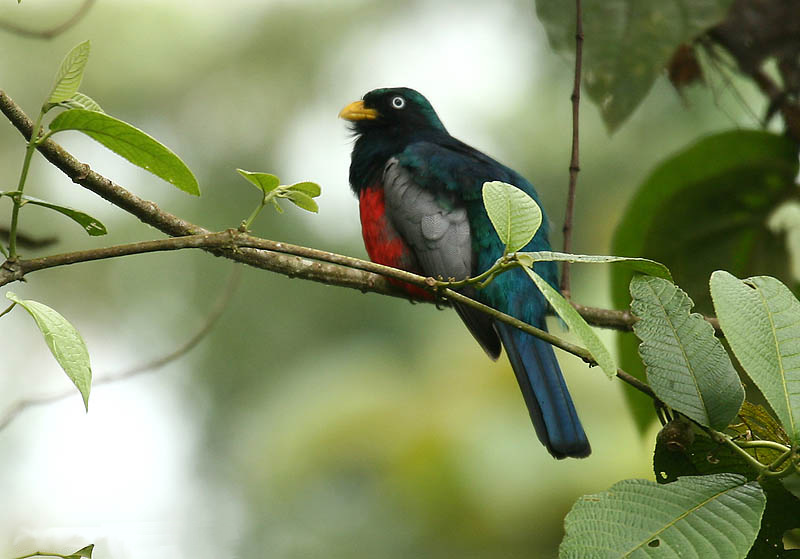
- Male in northwestern Ecuador

Conservation status
- Least Concern (IUCN 3.1)

Scientific classification
- Kingdom: Animalia
- Phylum: Chordata
- Class: Aves
- Order: Trogoniformes
- Family: Trogonidae
- Genus: Trogon
- Species: T. comptus

Binomial name
- Trogon comptus Zimmer, 1948

= Chocó trogon =

Species of bird

The Chocó trogon (Trogon comptus), also known as the white-eyed trogon or blue-tailed trogon, is a species of bird in the family Trogonidae, the quetzals and trogons. It is found in Colombia and Ecuador.

== Taxonomy and systematics ==
The Chocó trogon is monotypic.

== Description ==
The Chocó trogon is about 28 cm (11 in) long and weighs about 104 g (3.7 oz). The male has a yellow bill, a black face and throat, and a white eye. Its crown, back, and breast are green with a bluish tinge, the rump purplish blue, and the belly and vent area red. The upperside of the tail is purplish blue with a broad black tip and the underside is slaty. The folded wing is gray with vermiculation. The female differs in having a slaty maxilla and gray head, back, breast, and upper belly.

== Distribution and habitat ==
The Chocó trogon is found from Colombia's northern Antioquia and northeastern Chocó Departments south into northwestern Ecuador's Pichincha Province. It inhabits the interior and edges of humid and wet forest. It favors hilly terrain from sea level to 1,800 m (5,900 ft) of elevation.

== Behavior ==
=== Feeding ===
Nothing is known about the Chocó trogon's foraging behavior or diet. Evidence of the Chocó trogon eating fruits and arthropods has been found through stomach content analysis.

=== Breeding ===
Individuals in breeding condition were noted in March but nothing else is known about the Chocó trogon's breeding phenology.

=== Vocalization ===
The Chocó trogon's song is "a slow repetition of 7-15 'cow' notes" and its call "a fast 'krr-krr-krr'."

== Status ==
The IUCN has assessed the Chocó trogon as being of Least Concern, though it population is unknown and believed to be decreasing.
