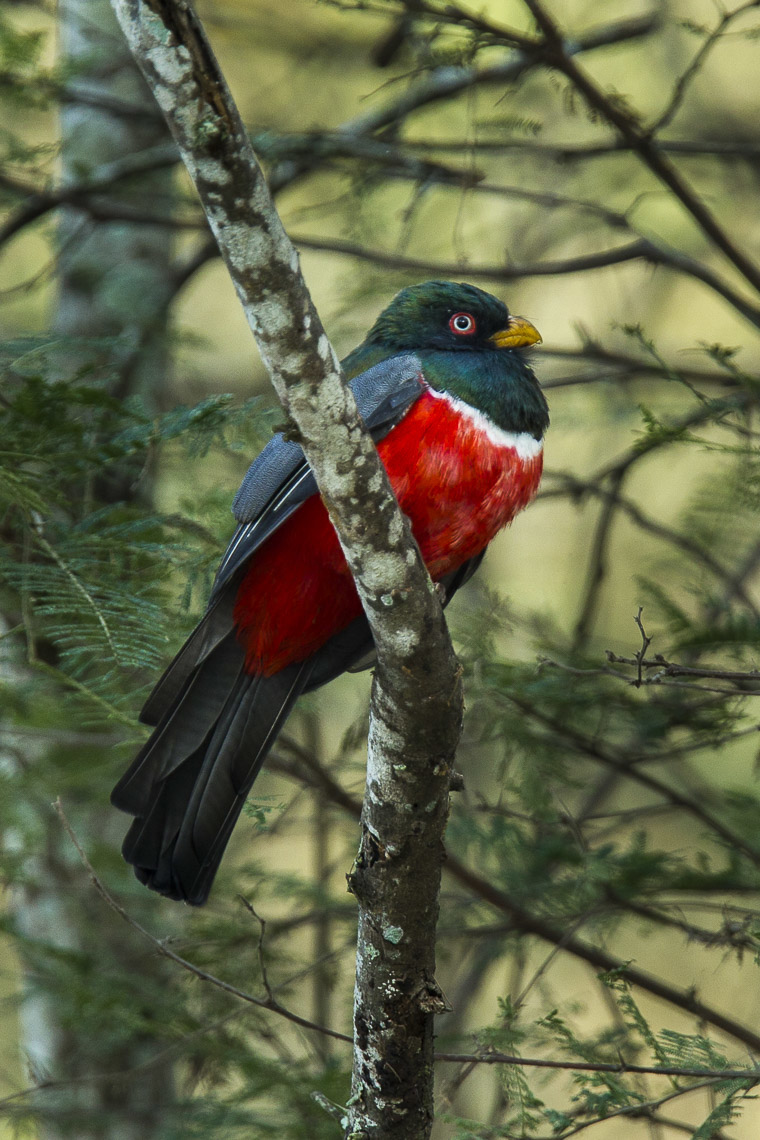

Conservation status
- Least Concern (IUCN 3.1)

Scientific classification
- Kingdom: Animalia
- Phylum: Chordata
- Class: Aves
- Order: Trogoniformes
- Family: Trogonidae
- Genus: Trogon
- Species: T. mesurus

Binomial name
- Trogon mesurus (Cabanis & Heine, 1863)

Synonyms
- Troctes mesurus; Curucujus melanurus pacificus; Trogon melanurus mesurus

= Ecuadorian trogon =

Species of bird

The Ecuadorian trogon (Trogon mesurus) is a species of bird in the family Trogonidae, the quetzals and trogons. It is found in Ecuador and Peru.

== Taxonomy and systematics ==
What is now the Ecuadorian trogon went through several scientific name changes. The last before the current binomial was Trogon melanurus mesurus, a subspecies of black-tailed trogon. Genetic studies in the early 2000s determined, that it is a species in its own right. It is monotypic.

== Description ==
The Ecuadorian trogon is 30.5 to 32 cm (12 to 13 in) long. One male weighed 96 g (3.4 oz) and a female 100 g (3.5 oz). The male has a black face and throat with a red ring around the eye. The crown, nape, upperparts, and upper breast are iridescent green. A white band separates the upper breast from the deep red lower breast, belly, and vent. The upperside of the tail is green, and the underside is slaty gray. The folded wing has fine black and grayish white vermiculation. The female replaces the male's green parts with shades of gray.

== Distribution and habitat ==
The Ecuadorian trogon is found from Ecuador's most northerly province, Esmeraldas, south into Peru's Lambayeque Province. It inhabits the edges and interior of humid evergreen forest and semideciduous forest. In Ecuador, it ranges in elevation from sea level to about 2,000 m (6,600 ft) and in Peru it occurs between 400 and 1,250 m (1,300 and 4,100 ft).

== Behavior ==
=== Feeding ===
The feeding behavior and diet of the Ecuadorian trogon have not been studied. It is assumed to sally from a perch to pluck fruit or arthropods from vegetation in the same manner as other trogons.

=== Breeding ===
The only described nests of the Ecuadorian trogon were cavities excavated in active arboreal termitaria. The clutch size was three eggs. Both sexes incubated the eggs.

=== Vocalization ===
The Ecuadorian trogon's song is "a slow, short series of cow notes that often starts slowly and builds in strength, e.g., cuh-cuh-cuh-cuh-cow-cow-ców-ców-ców." Both sexes make a call of "a rapid series of churring notes: crra crra crra crra."

== Status ==
The IUCN has assessed the Ecuadorian trogon as being of The Least Concern. Though its population has not been quantified, it is believed to be stable. However, "As with other species that occupy forested habitats, [the] Ecuadorian Trogon is vulnerable to habitat loss or degradation."
