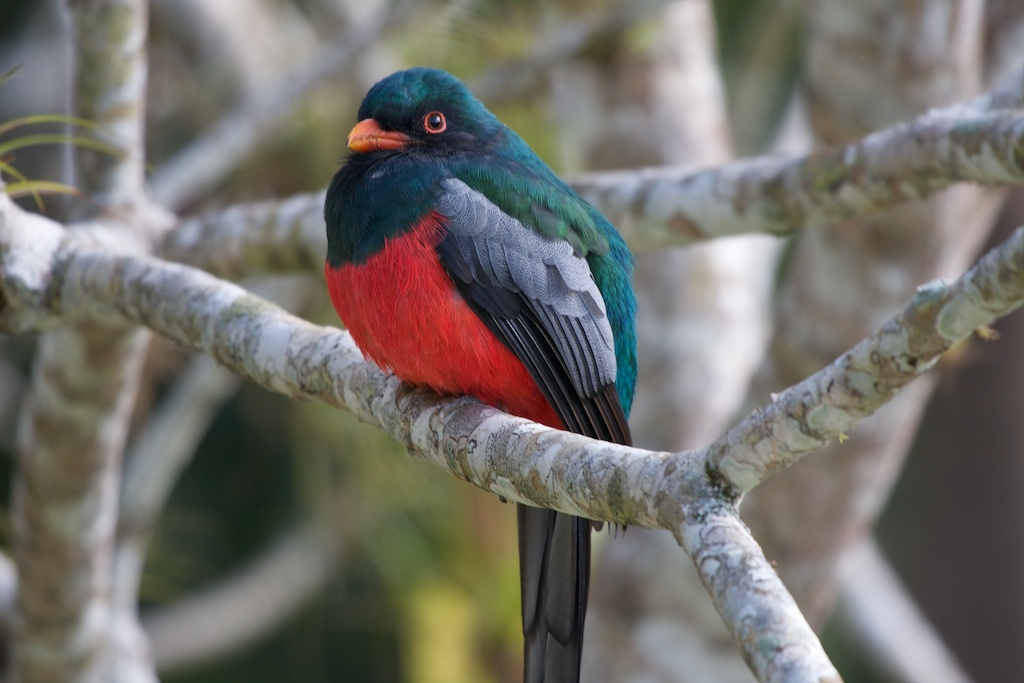
- Male, Belize
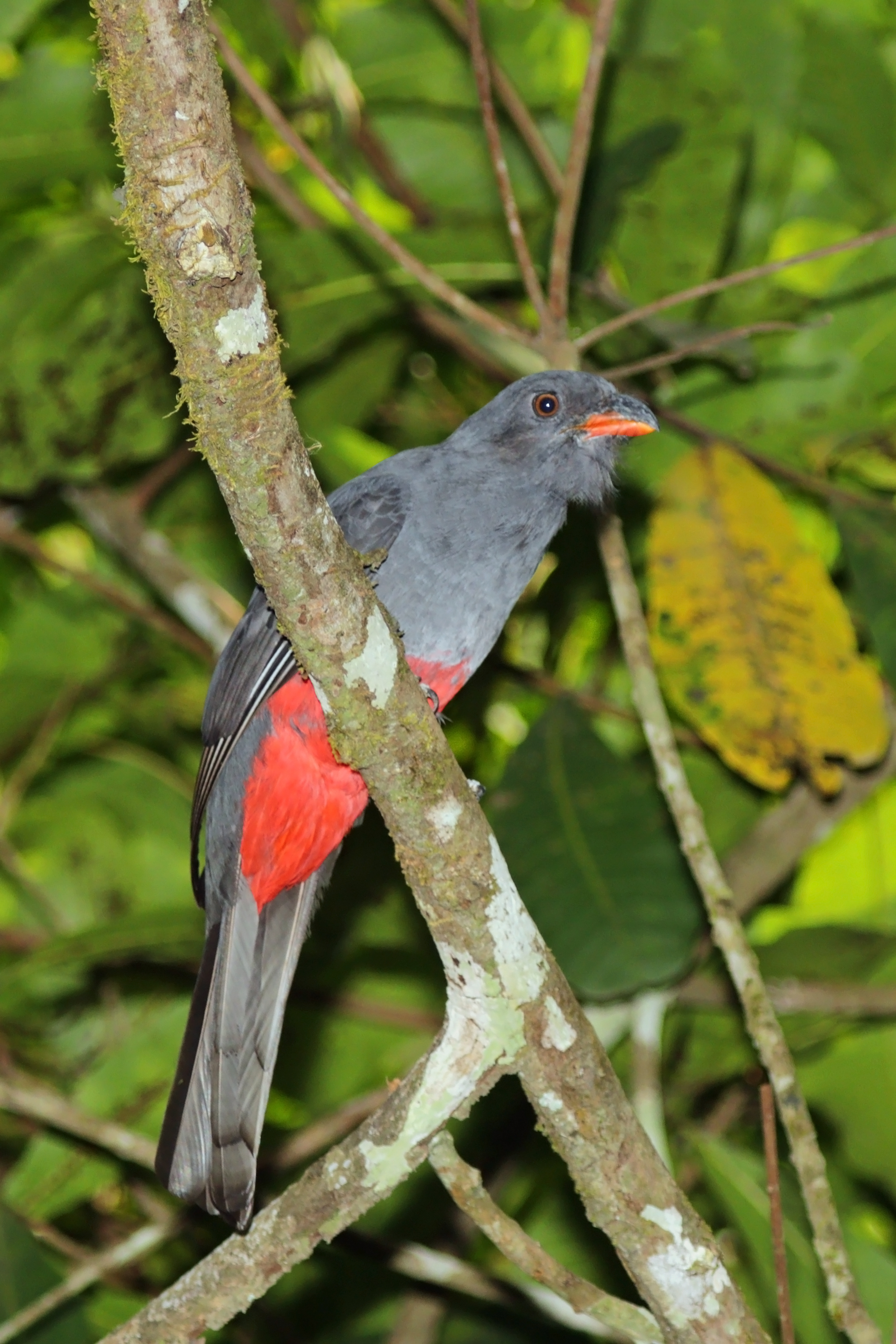
- Female T. m. hoffmanni, Panama

Conservation status
- Least Concern (IUCN 3.1)

Scientific classification
- Kingdom: Animalia
- Phylum: Chordata
- Class: Aves
- Order: Trogoniformes
- Family: Trogonidae
- Genus: Trogon
- Species: T. massena

Binomial name
- Trogon massena Gould, 1838

= Slaty-tailed trogon =

Species of bird

The slaty-tailed trogon (Trogon massena) is a species of bird in the family Trogonidae, the quetzals and trogons. It is found in Mexico, throughout Central America, and in Colombia and Ecuador.

== Taxonomy and systematics ==
Three subspecies of slaty-tailed trogon are recognized as of 2021: the nominate T. m. massena, T. m. hoffmanni, and T. m. australis. The last has sometimes been treated as a subspecies of black-tailed trogon (T. melanurus) or as a separate species.

== Description ==
Trogons have distinctive male and female plumages, with soft, often colorful, feathers. The slaty-tailed trogon is 30 to 35.5 cm (12 to 14 in) long and weighs about 140 to 155 g (4.9 to 5.5 oz). The nominate male has an orange-red bill and a dull black face, chin, and upper throat with a red to orange ring around the eye. The upperparts are metallic green that tends to golden green on the back and bluish green on the crown and rump. The breast is metallic green and the belly and vent deep red. The folded wing has fine black and white vermiculation that looks gray at a distance. The upperside of the four central tail feathers are metallic green to bronzy green with black tips, the next pair mostly black, and the outermost pair entirely black. The undersides of the tail feathers are slate gray with black tips. The female replaces most of the male's green with gray that is paler on the upper breast than on the upperparts. The upperside of the tail is black. The female's maxilla is dusky gray.

The male T. m. hoffmanni's plumage is essentially the same as the nominate's but the upperside of the tail is more golden. T. m. australis is smaller than the nominate. Compared to the nominate, the male's uppertail is bluish green and the female's darker gray. The male's undertail is browner than the nominate's and there is more metallic green on the face and throat.

== Distribution and habitat ==
The nominate subspecies of slaty-tailed trogon is found on the Caribbean slope from southern Mexico through Belize, Honduras, and Guatemala into Nicaragua. T. m. hoffmanni is found on the Caribbean and Pacific slopes of Costa Rica and Panama, and also in extreme northwestern Colombia. T. m. australis is found in western Colombia and far northwestern Ecuador. The species primarily inhabits the midstory to the canopy of tropical evergreen forest and mature secondary forest, and can also be found in gallery forest, coffee plantations, and mangroves. It is a bird of the lowlands, reaching only 600 m (2,000 ft) in Mexico and northern Central America. It is found locally as high as 1,200 m (3,900 ft) in Costa Rica, 1,400 m (4,600 ft) in Panama, and 1,100 m (3,600 ft) in Colombia.

== Behavior ==
=== Feeding ===
The slaty-tailed trogon forages for fruits and insects by sallying or hover gleaning from a perch. It often follows white-faced capuchin monkeys (Cebus capucinus and C. imitator) to catch insects displaced by them.

=== Breeding ===
The slaty-tailed trogon's breeding season varies geographically, but appears to span from February to July overall. Males and females display to each other by raising the tail and fluffing the uppertail covert feathers. It nests as high as 15 m (49 ft) in a cavity excavated in an occupied termite nest or decaying tree trunk. Both sexes excavate the nesting chamber. The typical clutch is two or three white or bluish-white eggs, and both sexes incubate them.

=== Vocalization ===
The slaty-tailed trogon's song is "a steady deliberate series of cow or cue notes"; another description is "a deep full-throated wuk, wuk, wuk …." Its calls include "a quiet clucking huh-huh-huh-huh" and a "chuckling chatter".

== Status ==
The IUCN has assessed the slaty-tailed trogon as being of Least Concern. It has a large range, and though its population has not been quantified it is believed to be stable. No immediate threats have been identified. However, "The primary threats to this species are logging of mature forests, and habitat conversion for agriculture."
