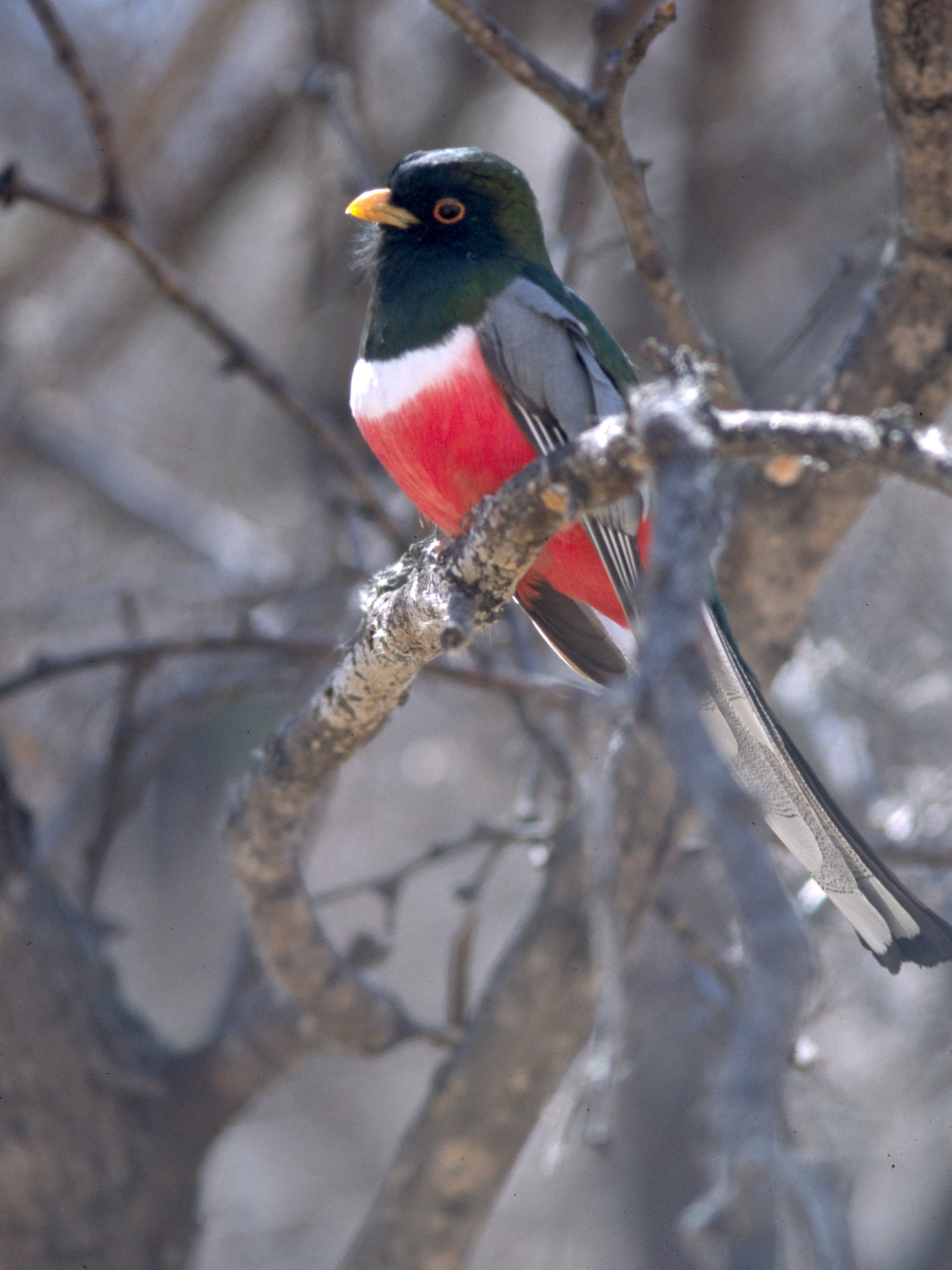
- Elegant trogon (Trogon elegans)

Scientific classification
- Kingdom: Animalia
- Phylum: Chordata
- Class: Aves
- Order: Trogoniformes
- Family: Trogonidae
- Genus: Trogon; Brisson, 1760

Type species
- Trogon viridis Linnaeus, 1766

Species
- See text.

= Trogon (genus) =

Genus of birds

Trogon is a genus of Coraciimorphae birds in the trogon family. Its members occur in forests and woodlands of the Americas, ranging from southeastern Arizona to northern Argentina.

They have large eyes, stout hooked bills, short wings, and long, squared-off, strongly graduated tails; black and white tail-feather markings form distinctive patterns on the underside. Males have richly colored metallic plumage, metallic on the upperparts. Although many have brightly coloured bare eye-rings, they lack the colorful patches of bare facial skin in their African counterparts, Apaloderma. Females and young are duller and sometimes hard to identify in the field. Eggs are white or bluish-white, unlike the pale blue eggs of quetzals. See the family account for further details.

== Taxonomy ==
The genus Trogon was introduced by the French zoologist Mathurin Jacques Brisson in 1760 with the green-backed trogon (Trogon viridis) as the type species. The name of the genus is from the Ancient Greek τρωγων trōgōn for "fruit-eating" or "gnawing". The name had previously been used by the German naturalist Paul Möhring in 1752 for the blue-crowned trogon (Trogon curucui).

The following cladogram shows the relationships between 21 of the species placed in the genus. It is based on a molecular phylogenetic study by Jeffrey Dacosta and John Klicka that was published in 2008. The cladogram incorporates the species splits that resulted from this study.

- Trogon
  - Clade A
    - - - Amazonian black-throated trogon (T. rufus)
        - Atlantic black-throated trogon (T. chrysochloros)
      - - Choco black-throated trogon (T. cupreicauda)
        - Graceful black-throated trogon (T. tenellus)
    - - - Elegant trogon (T. elegans)
        - Coppery-tailed trogon (T. ambiguus)
      - - Mountain trogon (T. mexicanus)
        - - Collared trogon (T. collaris)
          - Masked trogon (T. personatus)
  - - Clade B
      - Lattice-tailed trogon (T. clathratus)
      - - - Slaty-tailed trogon (T. massena)
          - Ecuadorian trogon (T. mesurus)
        - - Choco trogon (T. comptus)
          - Black-tailed trogon (T. melanurus)
    - Clade C
      - - - Citreoline trogon (T. citreolus)
          - Black-headed trogon (T. melanocephalus)
        - - Green-backed trogon (T. viridis)
          - - Baird's trogon (T. bairdii)
            - White-tailed trogon (T. chionurus)
      - - Gartered trogon (T. caligatus)
        - - Amazonian trogon (T. ramonianus)
          - - Surucua trogon (T. surrucura)
            - - Guianan trogon (T. violaceus)
              - Blue-crowned trogon (T. curucui)

Certain plumage features map onto the phylogeny. In Clade A the females are brown-backed while in the other two clades females are gray-backed. The males in Clade A are all green-headed. In Clade B the males are green-headed and have mostly dark undertail patterns. In Clade C males are blue- or black-headed and have white or contrasting black-and-white undertail patterns. The belly color does not map onto the phylogeny. For example, in Clade C Baird's trogon is red-bellied while the white-tailed trogon is yellow-bellied. Similarly, the blue-crowned trogon is red-bellied while the Guianan trogon is yellow-bellied.

=== Species ===
The 24 species now recognised in the genus are:

Male	Female	Scientific name	Common name	Distribution
		Black-throated trogon or Yellow-bellied Trogon	Trogon rufus	Honduras south to western Ecuador and northern Argentina
		Graceful black-throated trogon or Northern black-throated trogon	Trogon tenellus	northern Honduras to far northwestern Colombia
		Choco black-throated trogon	Trogon cupreicauda	tropical western Colombia and western Ecuador
		Atlantic black-throated trogon	Trogon chrysochloros	east, south Brazil, Paraguay and northeast Argentina
		Elegant trogon	Trogon elegans	Guatemala in the south as far north as the upper Gila River in Arizona and New Mexico
		Coppery-tailed trogon	Trogon ambiguus	southeast Guatemala, Honduras, Nicaragua, and northwest Costa Rica
		Mountain trogon	Trogon mexicanus	Guatemala, Honduras, and Mexico and has occurred in El Salvador
		Collared trogon	Trogon collaris	northern Colombia, northern Venezuela and Trinidad and Tobago
		Masked trogon	Trogon personatus	the Andes
		Lattice-tailed trogon	Trogon clathratus	Costa Rica and Panama
		Slaty-tailed trogon	Trogon massena	southeastern Mexico south through Central America, to Colombia, and a small region of northwestern Ecuador
		Ecuadorian trogon	Trogon mesurus (split from T. melanurus)	western Ecuador and far north-western Peru
		Chocó trogon	Trogon comptus	western Colombia and north-western Ecuador.
		Black-tailed trogon	Trogon melanurus	north-western South America and adjacent Panama
		Citreoline trogon	Trogon citreolus	western Mexico
		Black-headed trogon	Trogon melanocephalus	northern Colombia, northern Venezuela and Trinidad and Tobago
		Green-backed trogon	Trogon viridis	the Amazon, the Guiana Shield, Trinidad, and the Atlantic Forest in eastern Brazil
		Baird's trogon	Trogon bairdii	Costa Rica and far western Panama
		White-tailed trogon	Trogon chionurus (split from T. viridis)	Chocó, ranging from Panama, through western Colombia, to western Ecuador
		Gartered trogon	Trogon caligatus (split from T. violaceus)	east-central Mexico, south through Central America, to west or north of the Andes in Colombia, Ecuador and Venezuela
		Amazonian trogon	Trogon ramonianus (split from T. violaceus)	the Amazon
		Surucua trogon	Trogon surrucura	south-eastern Brazil, eastern Paraguay, and far north-eastern Argentina and Uruguay
		Guianan trogon	Trogon violaceus	Mexico, Central America, and northern South America
		Blue-crowned trogon	Trogon curucui	Argentina, Bolivia, Brazil, Colombia, Ecuador, Paraguay, and Peru
