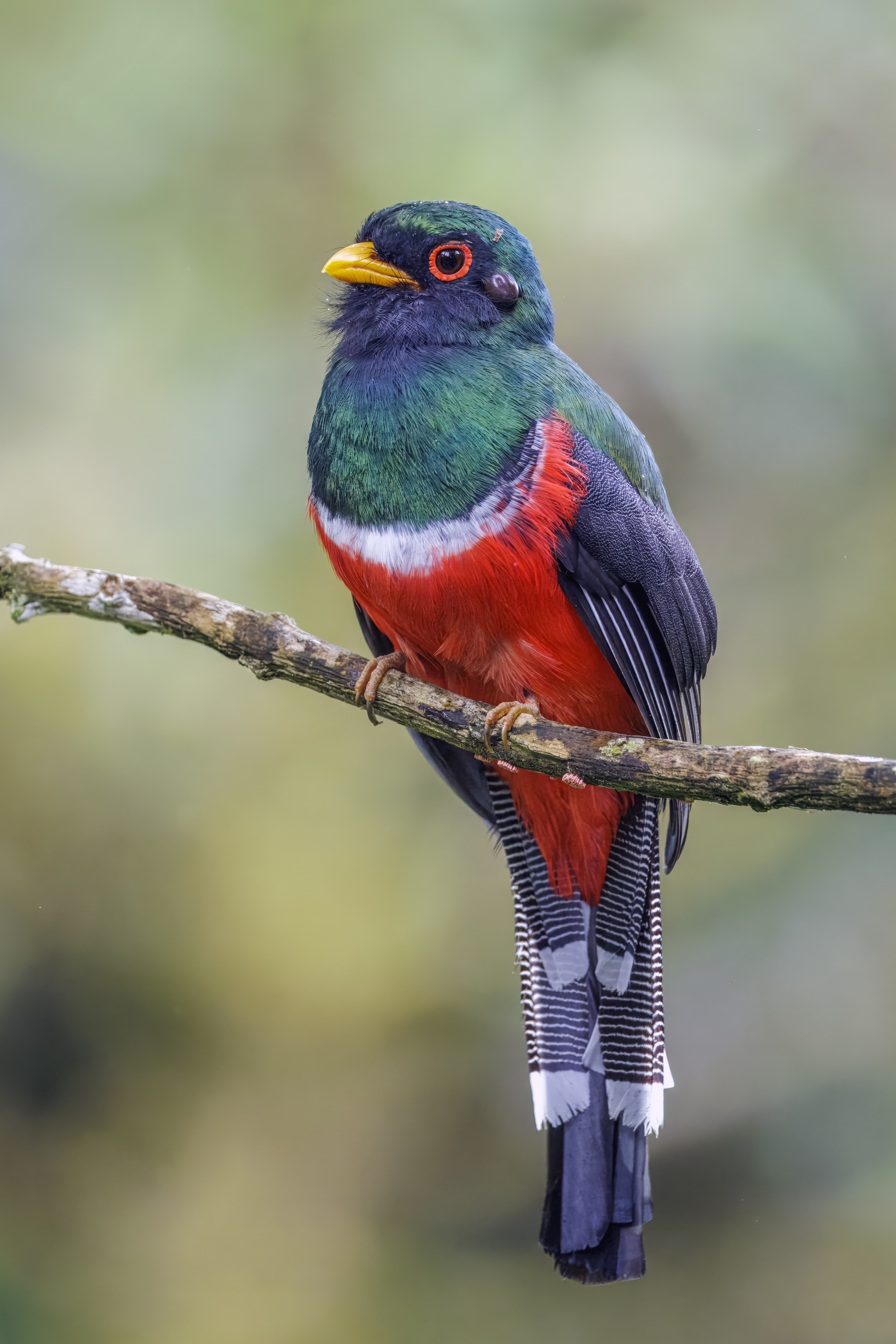
- Male T. p. temperatus, Ecuador
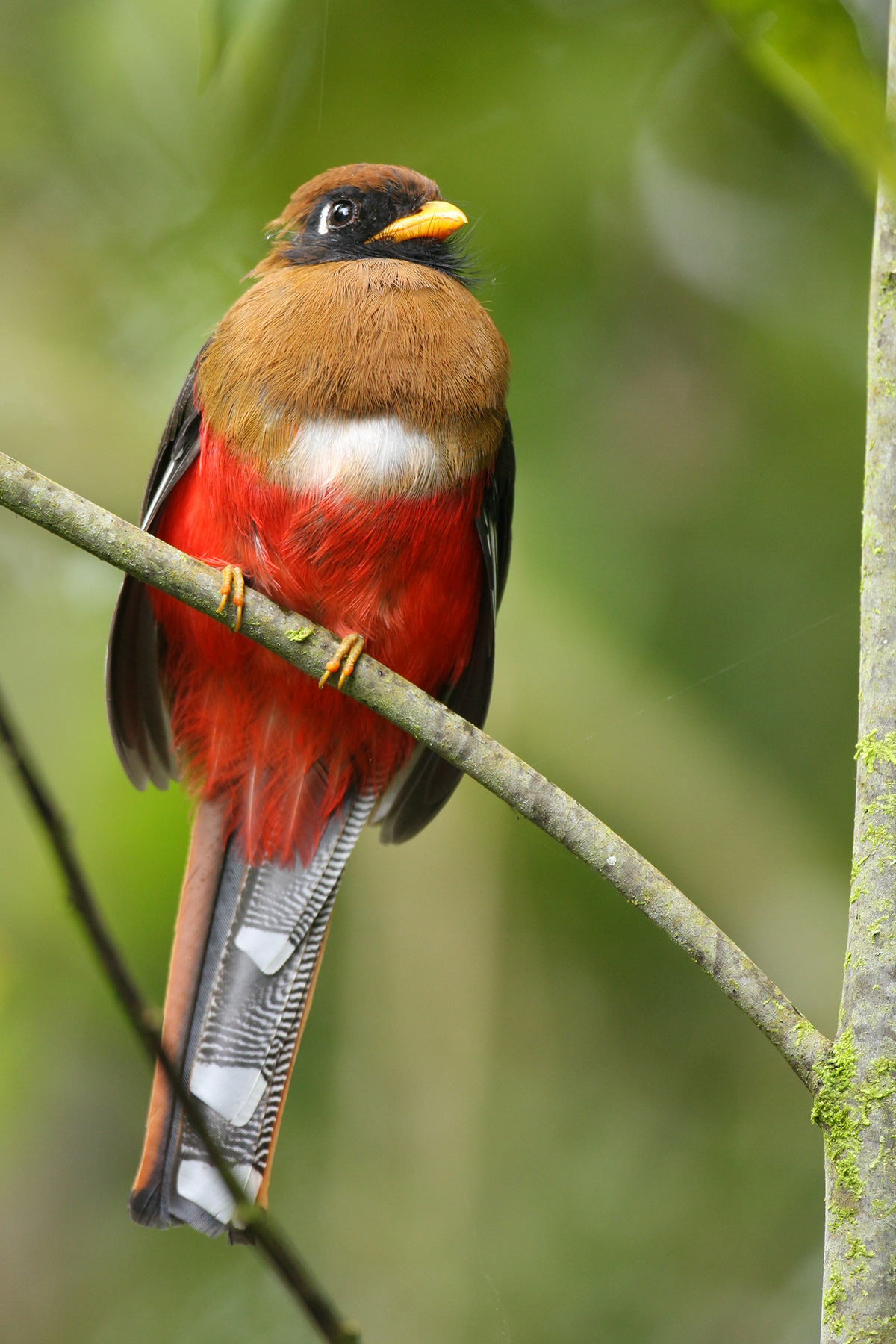
- Female, Tandayapa Valley, NW Ecuador

Conservation status
- Least Concern (IUCN 3.1)

Scientific classification
- Kingdom: Animalia
- Phylum: Chordata
- Class: Aves
- Order: Trogoniformes
- Family: Trogonidae
- Genus: Trogon
- Species: T. personatus

Binomial name
- Trogon personatus Gould, 1842

= Masked trogon =

Species of bird

The masked trogon (Trogon personatus) is a species of bird in the family Trogonidae. It is fairly common in humid highland forests in South America, mainly the Andes and tepuis, and is resident in Bolivia, Brazil, Colombia, Ecuador, Guyana, Peru and Venezuela.

== Taxonomy ==
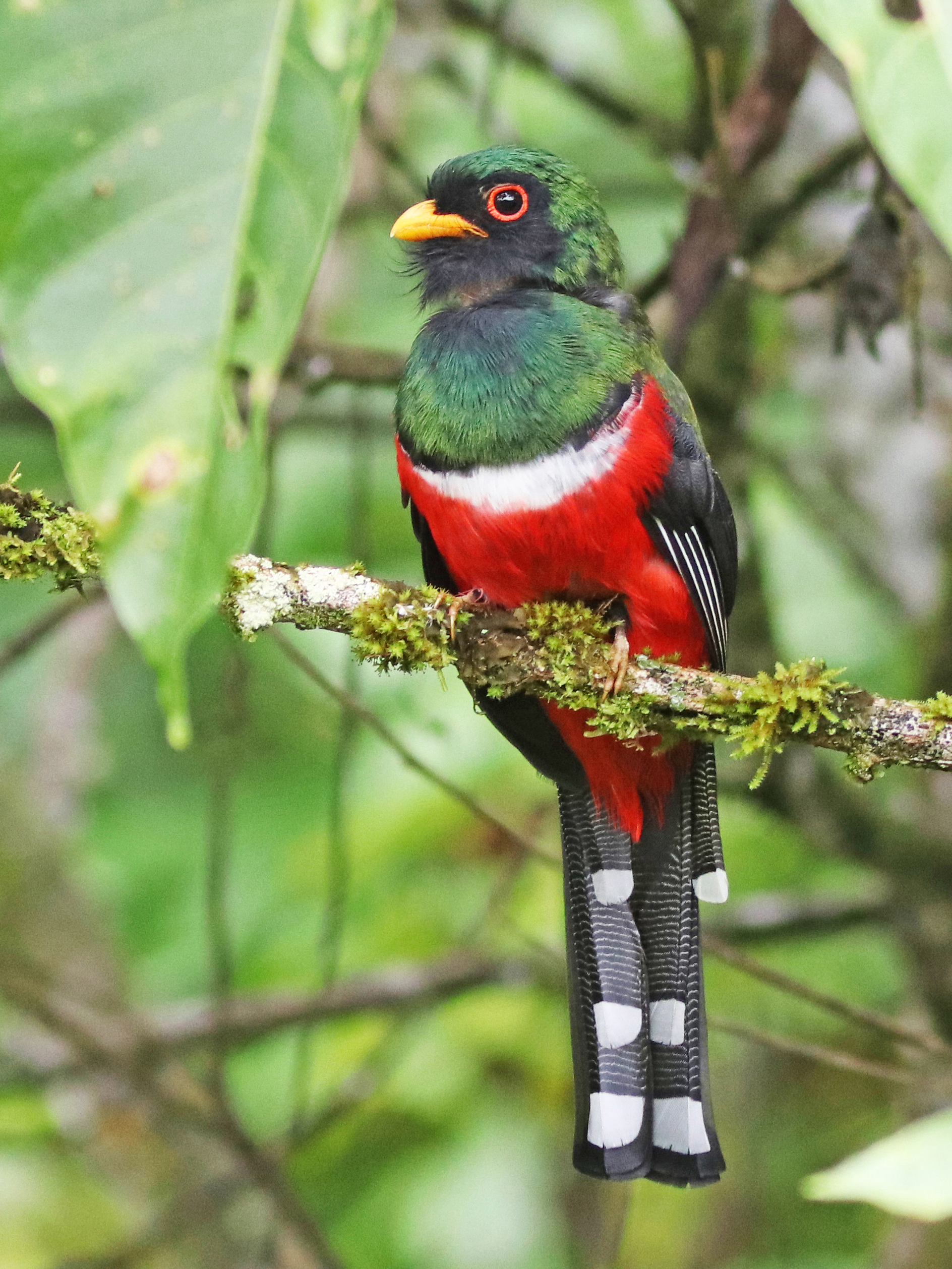
Male in northwestern Ecuador showing black "mask"

There are eight recognized subspecies of masked trogon:

- T. p. assimilis is found in the subtropics of the west Andean slope in Ecuador.
- T. p. duidae is found on cerro Duida in the tepui region of southern Venezuela; males of this subspecies are reddish-bronze on the back.
- T. p. personatus is found in the subtropical Andes of Venezuela, central and east Andean slopes in Colombia, and east Andean slopes in Ecuador and Peru; males of this subspecies are glossy green above.
- T. p. ptaritepui is found in the tepui region of southern Venezuela; males of this subspecies are golden-green on the back.
- T. p. roraimae is found on Auyantepui and Monte Roraima, on the border between Venezuela, Guyana and Brazil.
- T. p. sanctamartae is found in the Santa Marta Mountains of northeastern Colombia.
- T. p. submontanus is found in the Andean foothills in Bolivia.
- T. p. temperatus, sometimes considered to be a separate species, the highland trogon, is found in the temperate Andes of Colombia, Ecuador and Peru.

== Description ==
The masked trogon is a mid-sized trogon, averaging 27 cm (11 in) in length and 56 g (2.0 oz) in mass. Like all trogons, it displays sexual dimorphism. The upperparts, head, and upper chest of the male are variously glossy green, reddish-bronze, or golden-green (depending on the subspecies). The belly and lower breast are red; the latter separated from the greenish upper chest by a narrow white band. The male has a distinct eye-ring, which is red in most subspecies, but tending towards orange in the subspecies from the tepuis. The female is brown above, with a pinkish to red belly and breast; the white band separating brown and red on her underside is often either narrow or obscured. Females of all subspecies have a partial white eye-ring.

== Behavior ==
=== Feeding ===
Like all trogons, the masked trogon feeds on fruits and insects.

=== Breeding ===
The masked trogon excavates a cavity nest in the soft wood of a rotting vertical tree trunk.
