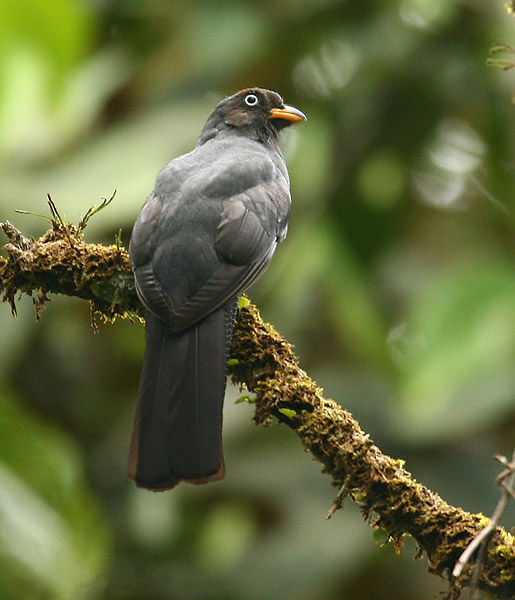
- Female in Costa Rica
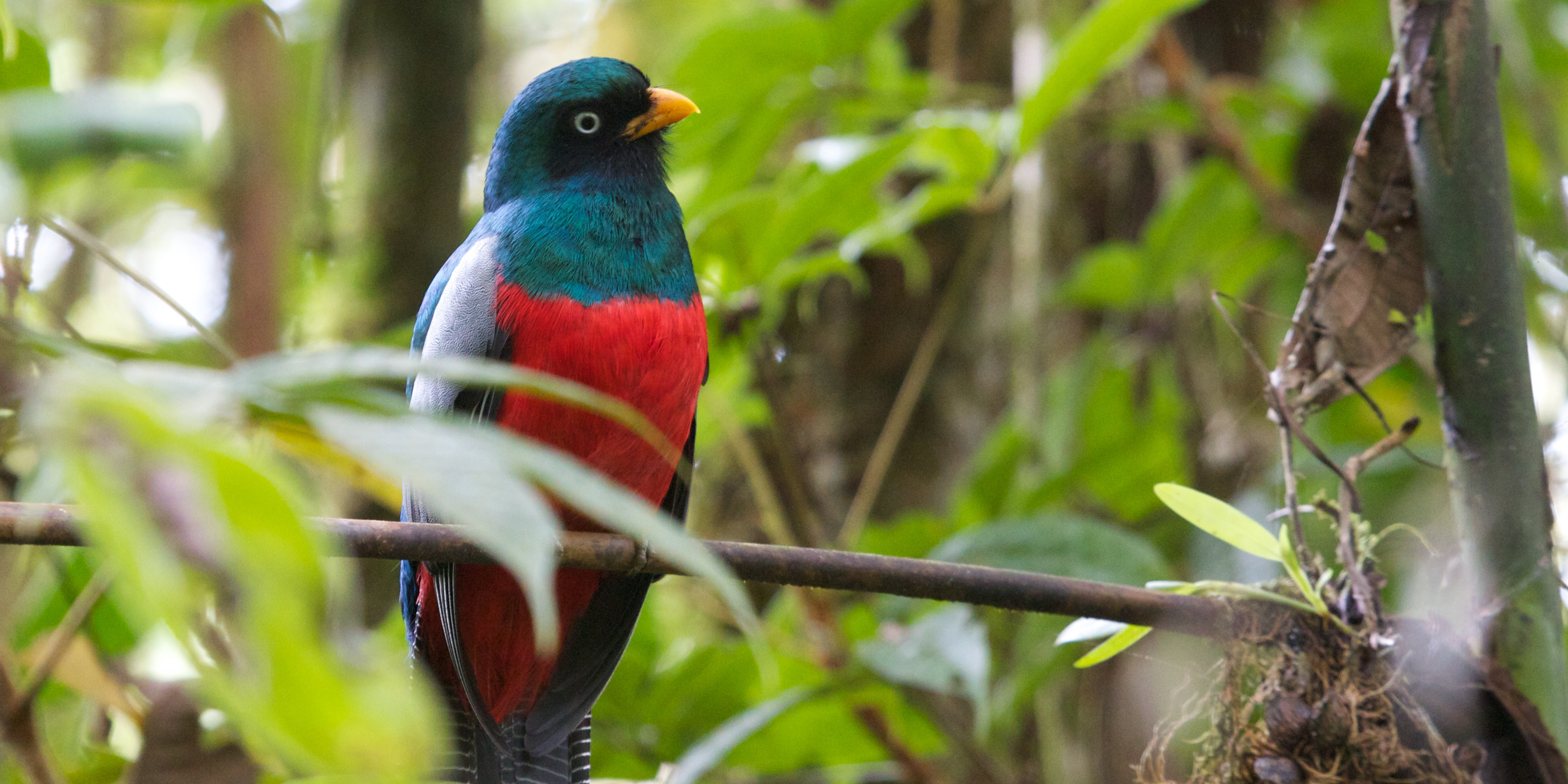
- Male in Costa Rica

Conservation status
- Least Concern (IUCN 3.1)

Scientific classification
- Domain: Eukaryota
- Kingdom: Animalia
- Phylum: Chordata
- Class: Aves
- Order: Trogoniformes
- Family: Trogonidae
- Genus: Trogon
- Species: T. clathratus

Binomial name
- Trogon clathratus Salvin, 1866

= Lattice-tailed trogon =

Species of bird

The lattice-tailed trogon (Trogon clathratus) is a species of bird in the family Trogonidae, the quetzals and trogons. It is found in Costa Rica and Panama.

== Taxonomy and systematics ==
The lattice-tailed trogon is monotypic.

== Description ==
The lattice-tailed trogon is about 30 cm (12 in) long and weighs about 130 g (4.6 oz). The male has a yellow bill, a whitish eye, and a blackish face, chin, and throat. The crown, nape, upperparts, and breast are iridescent green. The belly and vent are rosy red. The folded wing has fine black and white vermiculation that looks gray at a distance. The upperside of the tail is bluish green and underside slate gray with fine white bars. The female replaces the male's green with slaty gray, with an olive tint to the breast. The female's maxilla is dark.

== Distribution and habitat ==
The lattice-tailed trogon is found along the Caribbean slope for the length of Costa Rica and into western Panama; it is also found locally on the Pacific slope in Panama. It inhabits the midstory and lower canopy of mature humid to wet foothill and lower mountain forest. It is usually found in the forest interior but also at the edges and into shady semi-open landscapes. In elevation it ranges between 90 and 1,360 m (300 and 4,500 ft). It descends to the lower elevations towards the end of the rainy season, but is almost never found in the level lowlands.

== Behavior ==
=== Feeding ===
The lattice-tailed trogon's diet is mostly fruits and large insects but also occasionally includes small frogs and lizards.

=== Breeding ===
The lattice-tailed trogon's breeding season extends from February to May. It nests in a cavity excavated in a rotten tree or snag and sometimes an arboreal termitarium, usually between 5 and 8 m (16 and 26 ft) above ground.

=== Vocalization ===
The lattice-tailed trogon's song is a "rapid series of c.15 loud, resonant clucking 'kwa' notes rising in pitch and volume to a crescendo in [the] middle, then becoming faster, lower and softer".

== Status ==
The IUCN has assessed the lattice-tailed trogon as being of Least Concern, though it has a restricted range and its unquantified population is believed to be decreasing. "Habitat destruction within its range [is] now extensive, however, and careful evaluation of status needed."
