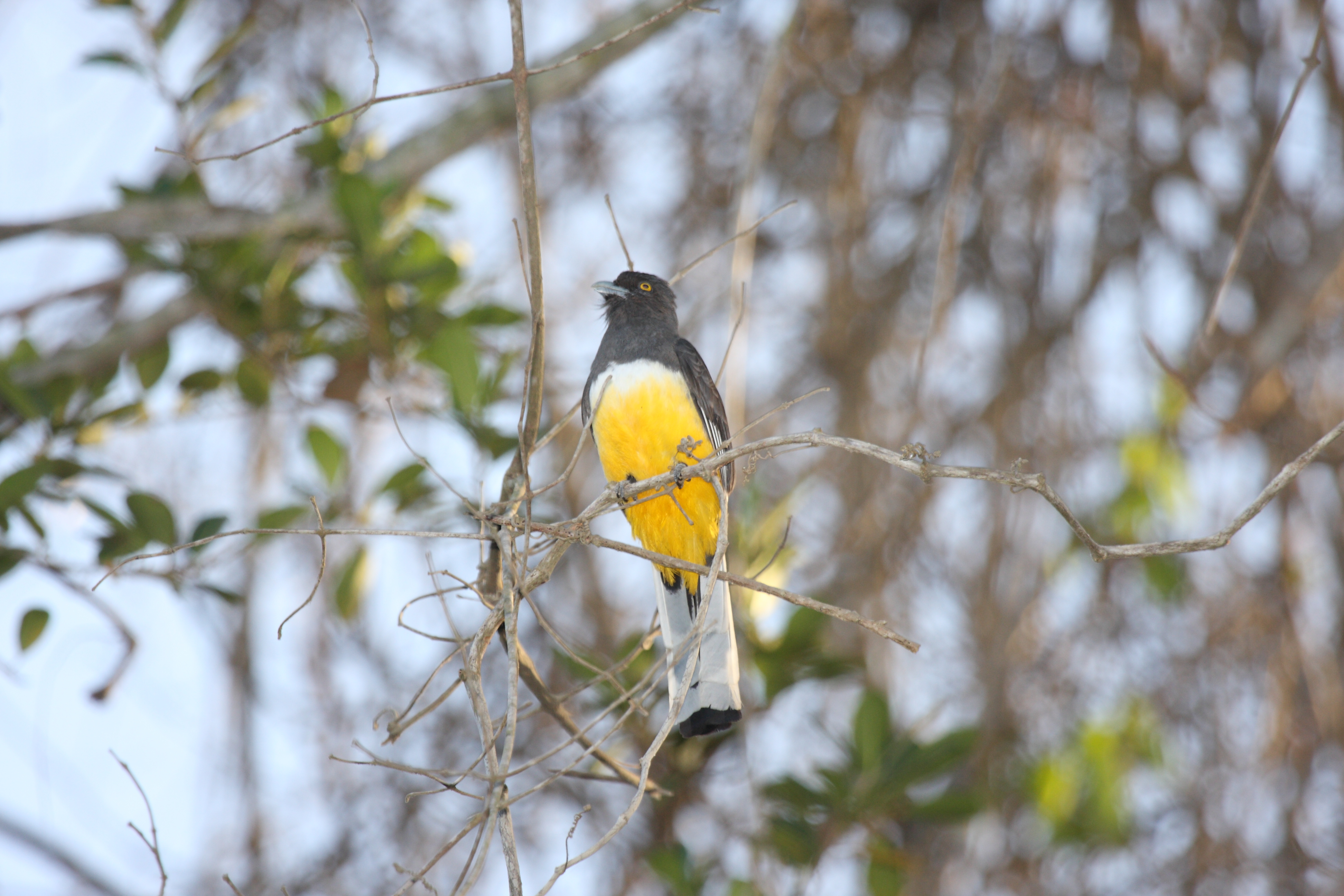

Conservation status
- Least Concern (IUCN 3.1)

Scientific classification
- Kingdom: Animalia
- Phylum: Chordata
- Class: Aves
- Order: Trogoniformes
- Family: Trogonidae
- Genus: Trogon
- Species: T. citreolus

Binomial name
- Trogon citreolus Gould, 1835

= Citreoline trogon =

Species of bird

The citreoline trogon (Trogon citreolus) is a species of bird in the family Trogonidae. It is endemic to western Mexico, with an estimated distribution size of 539,000 km^{2} Due to this very large range, the IUCN consider it a species of Least Concern and that the current population trend is stable. T. citreolus has also been studied as an Ecosystem engineer.

Much of our knowledge about this species comes from the work of Alexander Skutch.

== Habitat ==
Its natural habitats are arid or semi-arid woodland habitats, low coastal jungle, thorny brushland, thorn-forest, mangroves and plantations. This species build nests in cavities in arboreal termitaria (termite nests built in trees). It is thought that this nesting technique provides a critical role in creating necessary cavities for many organisms in tropical dry forests.

== Reproduction ==
Trogon citreolus reproduces between May and August, nesting in arboreal termite nests, in relatively sheltered vegetation, with 2-4 eggs per nest.

== Feeding ==
Trogon citreolus eats mainly fruit from January to June, and insects from July to November, both during December and January. Most insects are eaten, including flying species, which they catch whilst they hover momentarily at the end of a long upward or outward dart. There is wide range to their animal prey, including dragonflies; mantises, grasshoppers and other orthopterans; big caterpillars, both hairy and hairless; and many smaller insects. The fruit is often swallowed with the seed, which is later regurgitated. They also eat the orange coloured pulp of the Central American rubber tree (Castilla elastica) and the green fruiting catkins of cecropia.

== Identification ==
Around 27 cm in size, weighing between 85 and 90 grams. Adult males have a uniform gray head and upper breast and a metallic green mantle, fading to a violet-blue rump. The bill is pale blue-grey, and the eyes are yellow. The uppertail is blue-green with a black tip, and the wings are dark, with outer webs of the primaries white. The dark gray upper breast is separated from the bright yellow belly and undertail, with a creamy white breastband. Females are entirely dark gray above and tend to have a paler gray breast and paler yellow belly. Both sexes have dark bills and yellow eyes and predominantly white undertails. Near Ocozocoautla de Espinosa, the Citreoline can overlap with the Black-headed trogon, in this area the Citreoline is paler overall with more white in the undertail (extending all the way to the undertail coverts in the outer webs) and lacks the dark eye and white eyering.

The voice is similar to Trogon melanocephalus, a rapid sequence of low, throaty, short notes, resembling an antbird. In the mating season, several of each sex gather close together in scattered trees. Skutch observed that

"As each calls, it jerks its tail up and down with rapid but mincing strokes and shakes its slightly relaxed wings. Occasionally one trogon darts at another, who usually retreats without any show of resistance. The birds are evidently courting, but the proceedings are so long drawn out that it requires extraordinary patience to follow them to their natural conclusion. Later, while carving out the nest cavity, the trogons give voice to low, whining notes which resemble the grunts of new-born puppies."

== Subspecies ==
There are two subspecies of citreoline trogon:

- Trogon citreolus citreolus Gould, 1835 – Pacific slope of Mexico from Sinaloa to Oaxaca.
- Trogon citreolus sumichrasti Brodkorb, 1942 – Pacific coastal plain of Mexico in Oaxaca and Chiapas.
