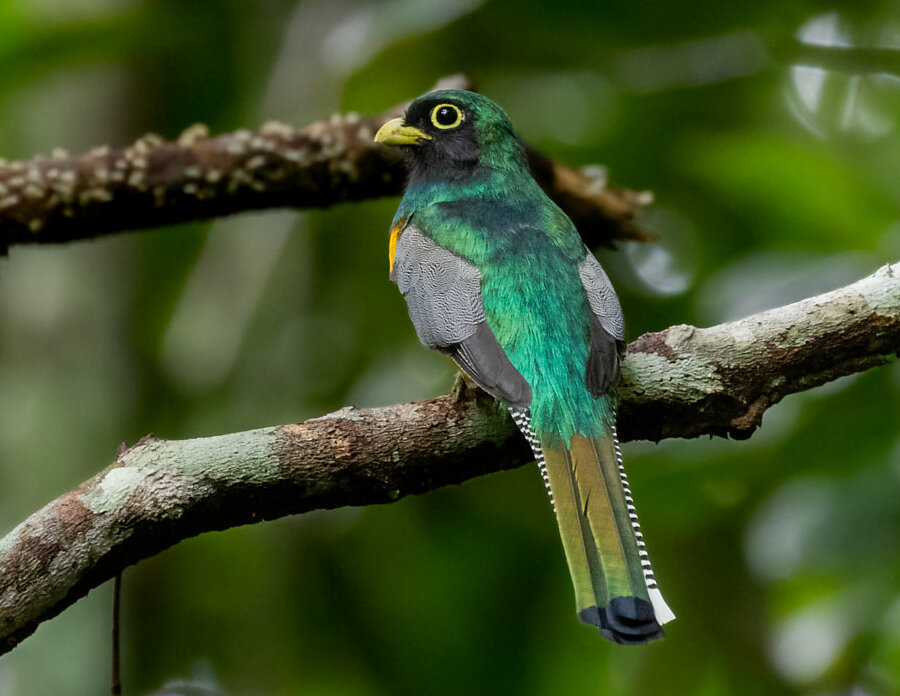
- Adult male in Manacapuru, Amazonas, Brazil
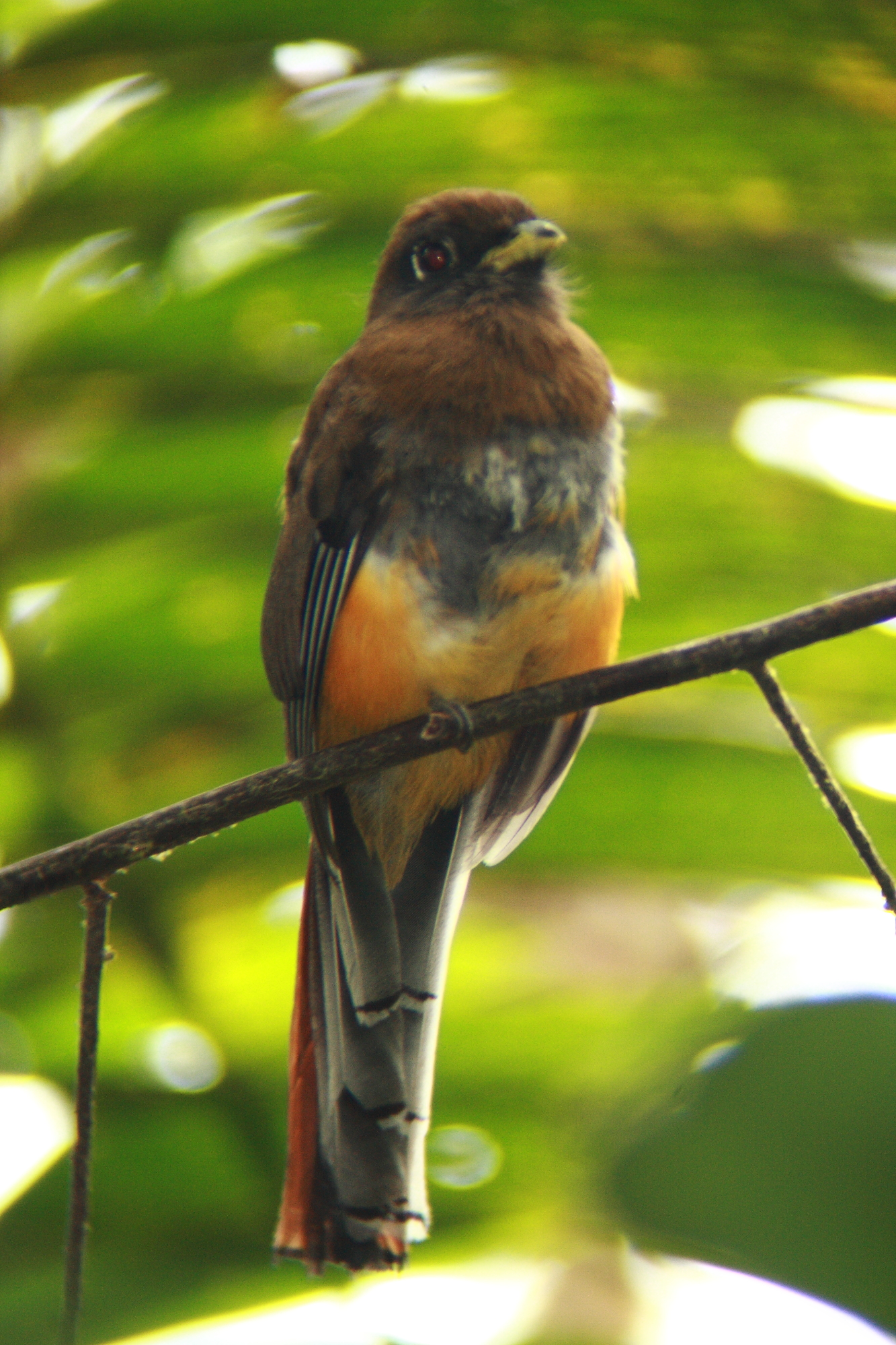
- Female

Scientific classification
- Kingdom: Animalia
- Phylum: Chordata
- Class: Aves
- Order: Trogoniformes
- Family: Trogonidae
- Genus: Trogon
- Species: T. rufus

Binomial name
- Trogon rufus Gmelin, JF, 1788

= Amazonian black-throated trogon =

Species of bird

The Amazonian black-throated trogon (Trogon rufus) is a bird in the family Trogonidae, the trogons and quetzals. Although it has also been called "yellow-bellied trogon" it is not the only trogon with a yellow belly (such a description would apply to the Black-headed trogon, or the Citreoline trogon as well). It is found in every mainland South American country except Argentina, Chile, Paraguay, and Uruguay.

== Taxonomy and systematics ==
The Amazonian black-throated trogon was formally described in 1788 by the German naturalist Johann Friedrich Gmelin in his revised and expanded edition of Carl Linnaeus's Systema Naturae. He placed it with the other trogons in the genus Trogon and coined the binomial name Trogon rufus. Gmelin based his description on the "Couroucou à queue rousse de Cayenne" that had been described and illustrated in 1779 by the French polymath Comte de Buffon in his Histoire Naturelle des Oiseaux. Buffon's specimen was a female with brown upperparts that had been collected in Cayenne. It later gained the English name "black-throated trogon". The specific epithet rufus is Latin for "red" or "ruddy".

The black-throated trogon was long treated as having six subspecies. Starting in 2022, the South American Classification Committee of the American Ornithological Society (AOS), the International Ornithological Congress, and the Clements taxonomy split it into four species. In this split Trogon rufus was renamed the Amazonian black-throated trogon and assigned these three subspecies:

- T. r. rufus Gmelin, JF, 1788
- T. r. sulphureus Spix, 1824
- T. r. amazonicus Todd, 1943

The other three subspecies that were previously considered part of the black-throated trogon sensu lato became the northern black-throated trogon or graceful black-throated trogon (T. tenellus), the Choco black-throated trogon or Kerr's black-throated trogon (T. cupreicauda), and the Atlantic black-throated trogon (T. chrysochloros, with the newly-described T. chrysochloros muriciensis). However, as of 2024 the North American Classification Committee of the AOS and BirdLife International's Handbook of the Birds of the World (HBW) have not recognized the split.

All three subspecies have been assigned a multitude of binomials since their description.

== Description ==
Like most trogons, the Amazonian black-throated has distinctive male and female plumages with soft colorful feathers. This relatively small species is 24 to 26 cm (9.4 to 10 in) long and weighs 45 to 60 g (1.6 to 2.1 oz). Adult males of the nominate subspecies T. r. rufus have a black forehead and face with a pale blue ring of bare skin around their eye. They are metallic green to blue on their crown, back, lesser wing coverts, rump, and uppertail coverts. Their flight feathers, primary coverts, and secondary coverts are various patterns of black and white. The upper side of their tail is metallic green to blue with a black band at the end. The underside of their tail has narrow black bars and moderate-width white bars. Their chin and throat are black, their upper breast metallic green to blue, and their lower breast and belly are yellow, sometimes with a thin white band below the upper breast. Adult females have mostly brown upperparts; their crown is darker and their rump and uppertail coverts lighter. Their face is brown with a pale blue ring of bare skin around their eye. Their primaries are mostly fuscous-black with a narrow white edge on their outer webs. Their secondaries and their greater and median coverts are copper with a dusky tinge. Their lesser wing coverts are black with brown tips. Their tail's upper side is mostly dark reddish brown with a wide black band at the end. Its underside has narrow black and white bars. Their throat and upper breast are a paler brown than their back with a white band below the upper breast. Their lower breast and belly are yellow. Immatures resemble the adults but are duller, and young males have a brown throat, breast, and wing coverts. Males have a mostly bright yellow to yellow-green bill; females' bills are highly variable from black with some yellow to dusky yellow with some black. Nestlings and juveniles have a mostly black bill. All ages of both sexes have a dark brown iris. Adults' legs and feet are bluish gray; those of nestlings and juveniles can be pinkish.

Both sexes of subspecies T. r. sulphureus are larger than the nominate. Males have a yellow or yellow green eye ring. They have a golden-green rump. Their tail's upper side is mostly reddish copper with a black band at the end and a green band between the colors. The underside's black and white bars are both wider than the nominate's. They usually have little or no white on their breast. Females have a green or yellow-green eye ring. They have a narrower black band than the nominate on the upper side of their tail. The underside's black and white bars are both wider than the nominate's.

Males of subspecies T. r. amazonicus have a yellow or yellow green eye ring. They have a golden-green rump and chest. Their tail's upper side is mostly reddish copper to shiny olive-green with a black band at the end and a green band between them. The underside's black bars are narrow and the white ones of medium width. They usually have little or no white on their breast. Females have a yellow eye ring. The upper side of their tail is dark reddish brown to very dark brown with a narrow black band at the end. The underside's black and white bars are both narrow.

== Distribution and habitat ==
The subspecies of the Amazonian black-throated trogon are found thus:

- T. r. rufus: from eastern Venezuela east through the Guianas and northern Brazil to the Atlantic
- T. r. sulphureus: east-central and southeastern Colombia south through eastern Ecuador into northeastern Peru and east into southern Venezuela, western Brazil, and far northern Bolivia
- T. r. amazonicus: southern Venezuela and northeastern Brazil

T. r. sulphureus and T. r. amazonicus intergrade along the Madeira River as do T. r. rufus and T. r. amazonicus along the Amazon.

The Amazonian black-throated trogon generally inhabits the understory to mid-story in the interior of humid primary forest and mature secondary forest, where it favors areas near streams. In Colombia it occurs in terra firme forest, and in southwestern Brazil is sometimes associated with stands of Guadua bamboo. In elevation it reaches 1,400 m (4,600 ft) in Colombia, 700 m (2,300 ft) in Ecuador, 650 m (2,100 ft) in Peru, 900 m (3,000 ft) in Venezuela, but in Bolivia only reaches about 300 m (1,000 ft).

== Behavior ==
"Trogons and quetzals perch erectly with tail hanging downward, and they may remain motionless and quiet for protracted periods." (emphasis in original)

=== Movement ===
The Amazonian black-throated trogon is a year-round resident throughout its range.

=== Feeding ===
The Amazonian black-throated trogon's diet has not been detailed but includes both fruit and insects. The usually capture insects by sallying or hovering from a perch and returning to it or another perch to eat. They sometimes follow army ant swarms to capture prey disturbed by the ants. A study in French Guiana found that there the species foraged alone 89% of the time and joined mixed-species feeding flocks at about 11%.

=== Breeding ===
Little is known about the Amazonian black-throated trogon's breeding biology. It is assumed to be similar to that of its formerly conspecific northern black-throated trogon, which see here.

=== Vocalization ===
Male trogons' song is "far-carrying and hollow...many more will be heard than seen" (emphasis in original). That of the Amazonian black-throated trogon is "a slow, regularly spaced series of 2–6 (typically 3–4) nasal, over-slurred coo notes". The pace and number of notes varies in a minor way among the subspecies. The species' call is a "churr".

== Status ==
The IUCN follows HBW taxonomy and so has assessed the undivided black-throated trogon rather than separately assessing the Amazonian black-throated trogon.
