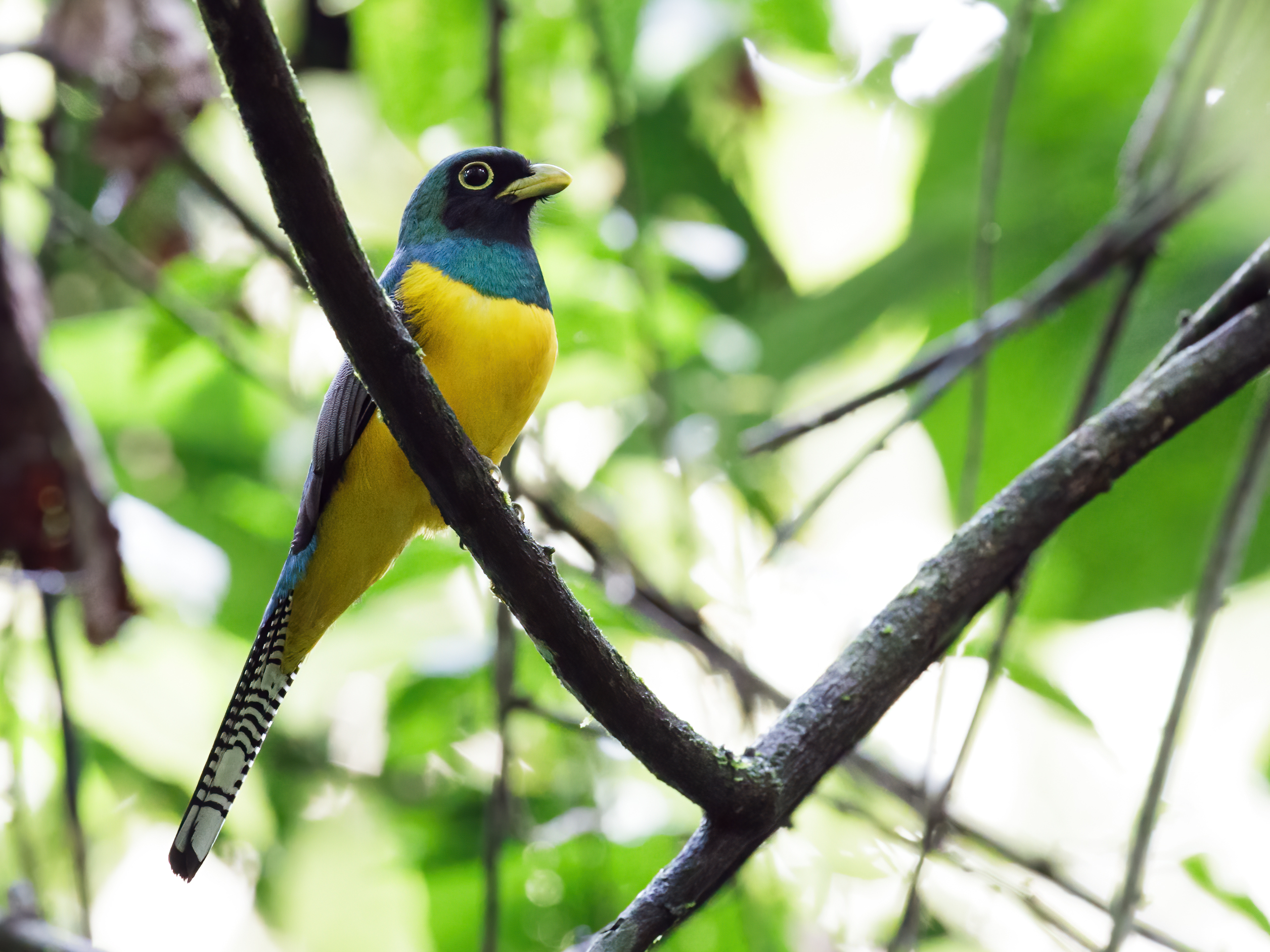

Scientific classification
- Kingdom: Animalia
- Phylum: Chordata
- Class: Aves
- Order: Trogoniformes
- Family: Trogonidae
- Genus: Trogon
- Species: T. cupreicauda

Binomial name
- Trogon cupreicauda (Chapman, 1914)

= Choco black-throated trogon =

Species of bird

The Choco black-throated trogon (Trogon cupreicauda), also known as Kerr's black-throated trogon, is a bird in the family Trogonidae, the trogons and quetzals. It is found in Colombia and Ecuador.

== Taxonomy and systematics ==
What is now the Choco black-throated trogon was long treated as one of six subspecies of the then "black-throated trogon" (Trogon rufus sensu lato). Starting in 2022, the South American Classification Committee of the American Ornithological Society (AOS), the International Ornithological Congress, and the Clements taxonomy split the black-throated trogon into four species, one of them being the Choco black-throated trogon. In this split Trogon rufus was renamed the Amazonian black-throated trogon. However, as of 2024 the North American Classification Committee of the AOS and BirdLife International's Handbook of the Birds of the World (HBW) have not recognized the split, retaining the six-subspecies black-throated trogon.

The Choco black-throated trogon is monotypic.

== Description ==
Like most trogons, the Choco black-throated has distinctive male and female plumages with soft colorful feathers. This relatively small species is about 25 to 26 cm (9.8 to 10 in) long. Adult males have a black face and throat with a pale blue ring of bare skin around their eye. They are metallic green on their crown, back, lesser wing coverts, and rump. Their uppertail coverts are bluish. Their flight feathers, primary coverts, and secondary coverts are various patterns of black and white. The upper side of their central pair of tail feathers is bluish with wide black tips. The next two pairs are similar with the addition of black inner webs. The outermost three pairs have black bases, white tips, and black and white bars between. The underside of their tail has black and white bars and a wide white tip. Their upper breast is metallic green and their lower breast and belly are yellow, sometimes with a thin black band below the upper breast. Adult females have mostly olive-brown upperparts; their crown is darker and their rump and uppertail coverts lighter. Their face is olive-brown with a whitish to pale blue ring of bare skin around their eye. Their primaries are mostly fuscous-black with a narrow white edge on their outer webs. Their secondaries and their greater and median coverts are copper with a dusky tinge. Their lesser wing coverts are black with brown tips. The upper side of their central pair of tail feathers is rufous-brown to copper with narrow black tips and a faint cinnamon-buff band between the colors. The next two pairs are black with rufous-brown to chestnut edges. The outermost three pairs have black bases, white tips, and black and white bars between. The underside of their tail has black and white bars and a wide white tip. Their throat and upper breast are a paler brown than their back with a white band below the upper breast. Their lower breast and belly are yellow. Males have a mostly bright yellow to yellow-green bill; females' bills are highly variable from black with some yellow to dusky yellow with some black. All ages of both sexes have a dark brown iris. Adults' legs and feet are bluish gray; those of nestlings and juveniles can be pinkish.

== Distribution and habitat ==
The Choco black-throated trogon is found in the Chocó–Magdalena region. Its range extends from the lower Magdalena River Valley west and then south along the Pacific slope of Colombia into northwestern Ecuador as far as Pichincha Province. It inhabits humid primary forest and mature secondary forest. In elevation it ranges from near sea level to 700 m (2,300 ft) in Ecuador and 1,100 m (3,600 ft) in Colombia.

== Behavior ==
"Trogons and quetzals perch erectly with tail hanging downward, and they may remain motionless and quiet for protracted periods." (emphasis in original)

=== Movement ===
The Choco black-throated trogon is a year-round resident throughout its range.

=== Feeding ===
The Choco black-throated trogon feeds primarily on insects and also includes fruit in its diet. Nothing else is known about its diet or feeding behavior.

=== Breeding ===
Details of the Choco black-throated trogon's breeding biology are scarce. Its nesting season in Columbia includes at least February to May. It nests in a cavity it excavates in a decayed tree or stump. The few observed clutches were of two eggs. Both parents contribute to the excavation, clutch incubation, and nestling care. Other details are assumed to be similar to those of its formerly conspecific northern black-throated trogon, which see here.

=== Vocalization ===
Male trogons' song is "far-carrying and hollow...many more will be heard than seen". (emphasis in original) That of the Choco black-throated trogon is "a slow, regularly spaced series of 4–10, typically 7 nasal, overslurred coo notes". The species' call is a "churr".

== Status ==
The IUCN follows HBW taxonomy and so has assessed the undivided black-throated trogon rather than separately assessing the Choco black-throated trogon.
