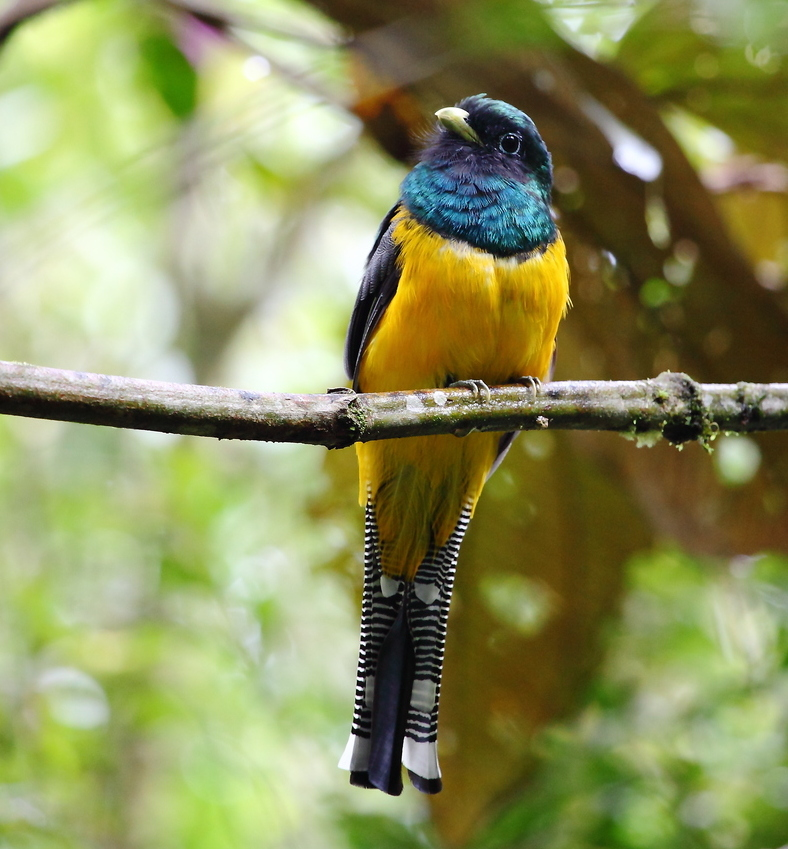
- Adult male in São Paulo, Brazil
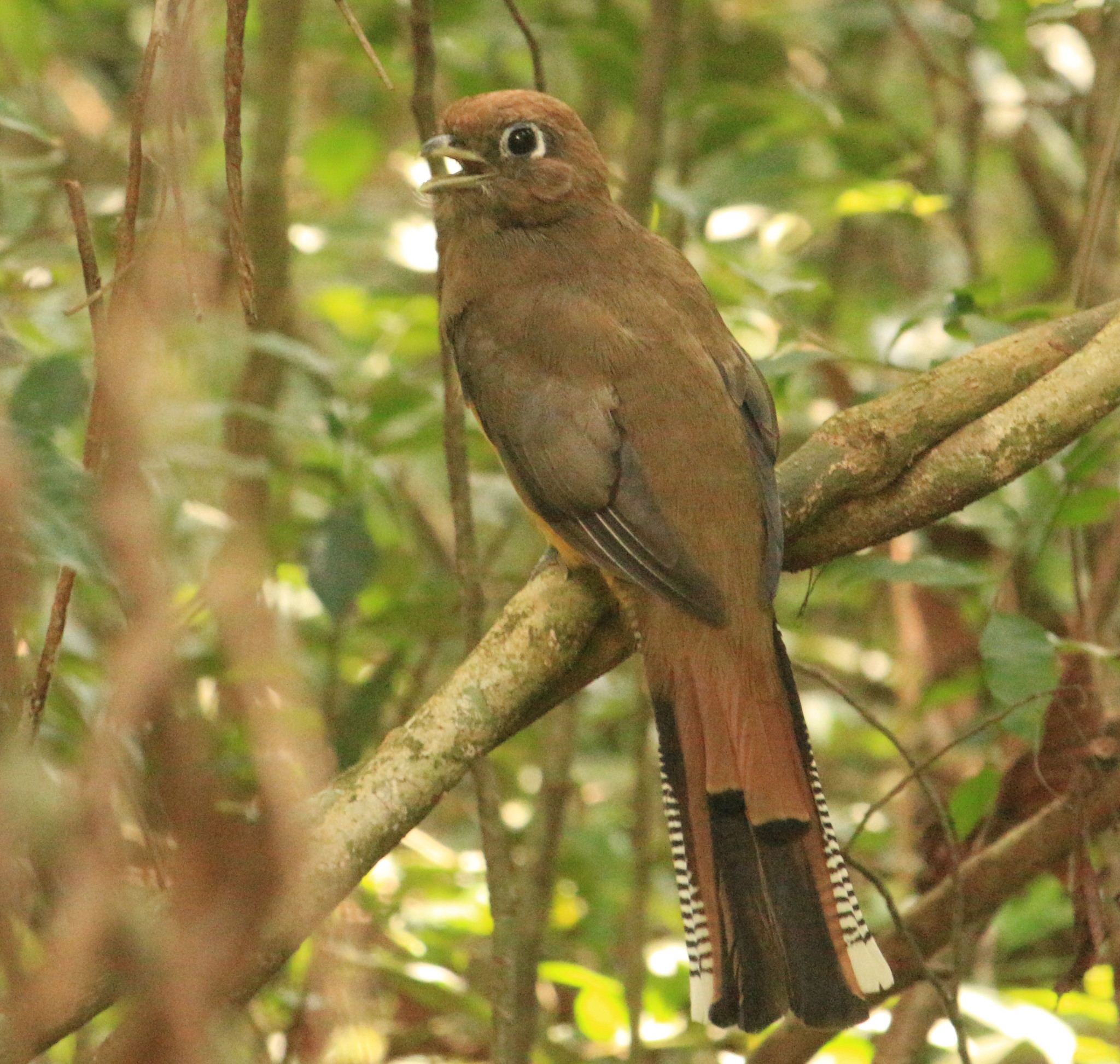
- Adult female

Scientific classification
- Kingdom: Animalia
- Phylum: Chordata
- Class: Aves
- Order: Trogoniformes
- Family: Trogonidae
- Genus: Trogon
- Species: T. chrysochloros

Binomial name
- Trogon chrysochloros Pelzeln, 1856

= Atlantic black-throated trogon =

Species of bird

The Atlantic black-throated trogon (Trogon chrysochloros) is a bird in the family Trogonidae, the trogons and quetzals. It is found in Argentina, Brazil, and Paraguay.

== Taxonomy and systematics ==
What is now the Atlantic black-throated trogon was long treated as one of six subspecies of the then "black-throated trogon" (Trogon rufus sensu lato). Starting in 2022, the South American Classification Committee of the American Ornithological Society (AOS), the International Ornithological Congress, and the Clements taxonomy split the black-throated trogon into four species, one of them being the Atlantic black-throated trogon. In this split Trogon rufus was renamed the Amazonian black-throated trogon. However, as of 2024 the North American Classification Committee of the AOS and BirdLife International's Handbook of the Birds of the World (HBW) have not recognized the split, retaining the six-subspecies black-throated trogon.

The Atlantic black-throated trogon has two subspecies, the nominate T. c. chrysochloros (Pelzeln, 1856) and T. c. muriciensis (Dickens, Bitton, Bravo & Silviera, 2021). The latter had been proposed as a full species.

The Atlantic black-throated trogon's specific epithet chrysochloros derives from the Greek χρυσος/khrusos meaning gold, and χλωρος/khlōros meaning green.

== Description ==
Like most trogons, the Atlantic black-throated has distinctive male and female plumages with soft colorful feathers. This relatively small species is 24 to 25 cm (9.4 to 9.8 in) long and weighs 49 to 66 g (1.7 to 2.3 oz). Adult males of the nominate subspecies have a black forehead and face with a pale blue ring of bare skin around their eye. They are metallic green on their crown, back, lesser wing coverts, rump, and uppertail coverts. Their flight feathers, primary coverts, and secondary coverts are various patterns of black and white. The upper side of their central pair of tail feathers is olive with wide black tips. The next two pairs are similar with the addition of black inner webs. The outermost three pairs have black bases, white tips, and black and white bars between. The underside of their tail has narrow black and white bars and a wide white tip. Their chin and throat are black, their upper breast metallic green, and their lower breast and belly are yellow, sometimes with a thin white band below the upper breast. Adult females have mostly olive to brownish upperparts; their crown is darker and their rump and uppertail coverts lighter. Their face is olive to brownish with a whitish to pale blue ring of bare skin around their eye. Their primaries are mostly fuscous-black with a narrow white edge on their outer webs. Their secondaries and their greater and median coverts are copper with a dusky tinge. Their lesser wing coverts are black with brown tips. The upper side of their central pair of tail feathers is rufous-brown to bright copper with thin black tips and a faint cinnamon-buff band between them. The next two pairs are black with rufous-brown to chestnut edges. The outermost three pairs have black bases, white tips, and black and white bars between. Their tail's underside has narrow black and white bars. Their throat and upper breast are a paler brown than their back with a white band below the upper breast. Their lower breast and belly are yellow. Immatures resemble the adults but are duller, and young males have a brown throat, breast, and wing coverts. Males have a mostly bright yellow to yellow-green bill; females' bills are highly variable from black with some yellow to dusky yellow with some black. In both sexes the bill has a serrated edge. Nestlings and juveniles have a mostly black bill. All ages of both sexes have a dark brown iris. Adults' legs and feet are bluish gray; those of nestlings and juveniles can be pinkish. Subspecies T. c. muriciensis is smaller than the nominate. Males have a greener upperside of the tail, narrower black bars on the tail's underside, no breast band, and more variable serrations on the bill.

== Distribution and habitat ==
The Atlantic black-throated trogon as a disjunct distribution. The nominate subspecies has by far the larger range of the two. It is found in Brazil from Bahia south to northern Rio Grande do Sul and west to southern Mato Grosso do Sul, eastern Paraguay almost to the Paraguay River, and Misiones and Corrientes provinces in far northeastern Argentina. It has been extirpated from Minas Gerais. Subspecies T. c. muriciensis is found in a small part of northeastern Brazil's Alagoas state. The nominate subspecies inhabits humid primary forest and mature secondary forest in lowlands and foothills. Subspecies T. c. muriciensis is a bird of the Atlantic Forest, and is known only at an elevation of about 500 m (1,600 ft).

== Behavior ==
"Trogons and quetzals perch erectly with tail hanging downward, and they may remain motionless and quiet for protracted periods." (emphasis in original)

=== Movement ===
The Atlantic black-throated trogon is a year-round resident throughout its range.

=== Feeding ===
The Atlantic black-throated trogon feeds primarily on insects and also small amounts of fruit (11% and 38% of its diet in two studies). It usually captures insects and plucks fruit by sallying or hovering from a perch and returning to it or another perch to eat. It has been observed following foraging South American coatis (Nasua nasua) to capture prey disturbed by their movements. It also follows army ant swarms, apparently for the same reason.

=== Breeding ===
The Atlantic black-throated trogon's breeding season in the southern part of the nominate subspecies' range includes at least October and November. Few nests are known, and only from Argentina. They were cavities excavated in decayed trees or stumps. The only known clutch was of three eggs. Both parents incubate the clutch and care for nestlings. The incubation period of the one clutch was at least 18 days; the time to fledging is not known. Other details of the species' nesting biology are assumed to be similar to those of its formerly conspecific northern black-throated trogon, which see here.

=== Vocalization ===
Male trogons' song is "far-carrying and hollow...many more will be heard than seen". (emphasis in original) The song of the nominate subspecies of Atlantic black-throated trogon is "a series of melancholic, monotonous notes delivered in series of four to eleven, but typically six or seven: pau pau pau pau pau pau". That of T. c. muriciensis is slower and has fewer notes. The species' call is a "churr".

== Status ==
The IUCN follows HBW taxonomy and so has assessed the undivided black-throated trogon rather than separately assessing the Atlantic black-throated trogon. "If the Alagoas population is eventually awarded species status, as originally proposed, then urgent conservation measures likely will be needed to ensure its survival. This population was already considered rare in 1986 and remains so to this day [2023]."
