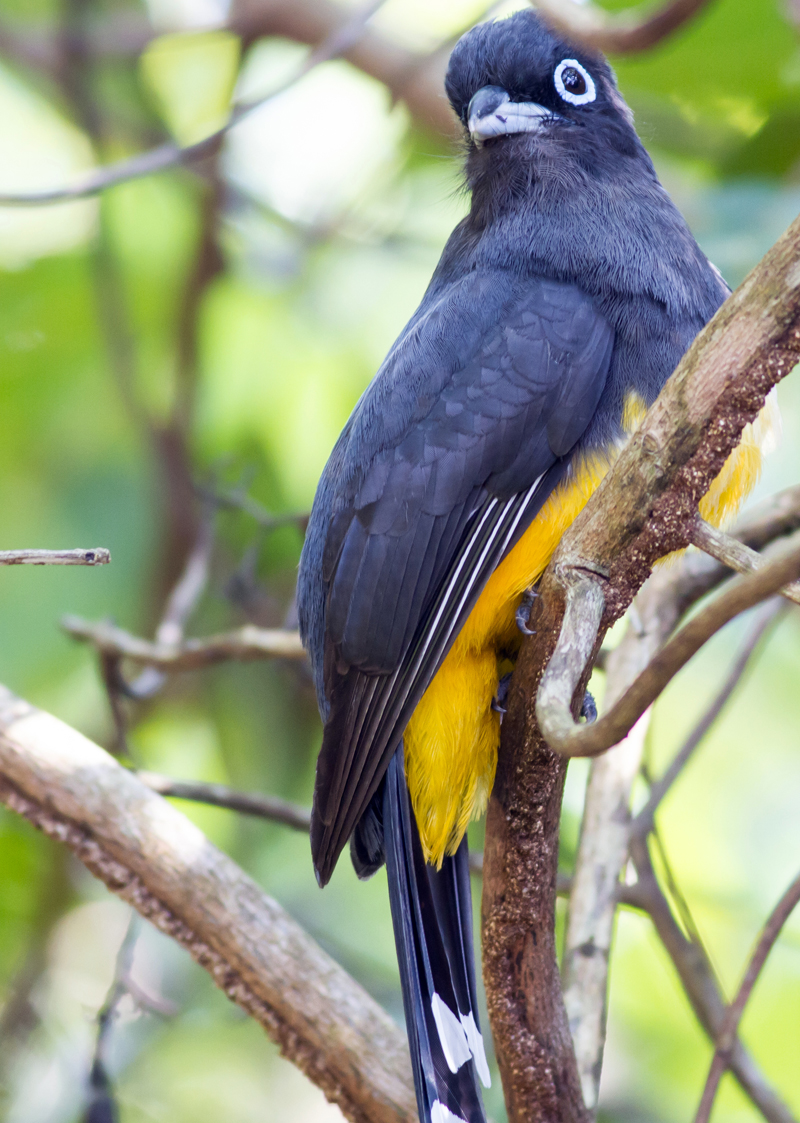
- Near Tulum, Mexico

Conservation status
- Least Concern (IUCN 3.1)

Scientific classification
- Kingdom: Animalia
- Phylum: Chordata
- Class: Aves
- Order: Trogoniformes
- Family: Trogonidae
- Genus: Trogon
- Species: T. melanocephalus

Binomial name
- Trogon melanocephalus Gould, 1836

= Black-headed trogon =

Species of bird

The black-headed trogon (Trogon melanocephalus) is a species of bird in the family Trogonidae. It is found in Belize, Costa Rica, El Salvador, Guatemala, Honduras, Mexico, and Nicaragua.

== Taxonomy and systematics ==
The black-headed trogon is treated as monotypic by the International Ornithological Committee and BirdLife International's Handbook of the Birds of the World. However, the Clements taxonomy assigns it two subspecies, the nominate T. m. melanocephalus and T. m. illaetabilis.

This article follows the monotypic model.

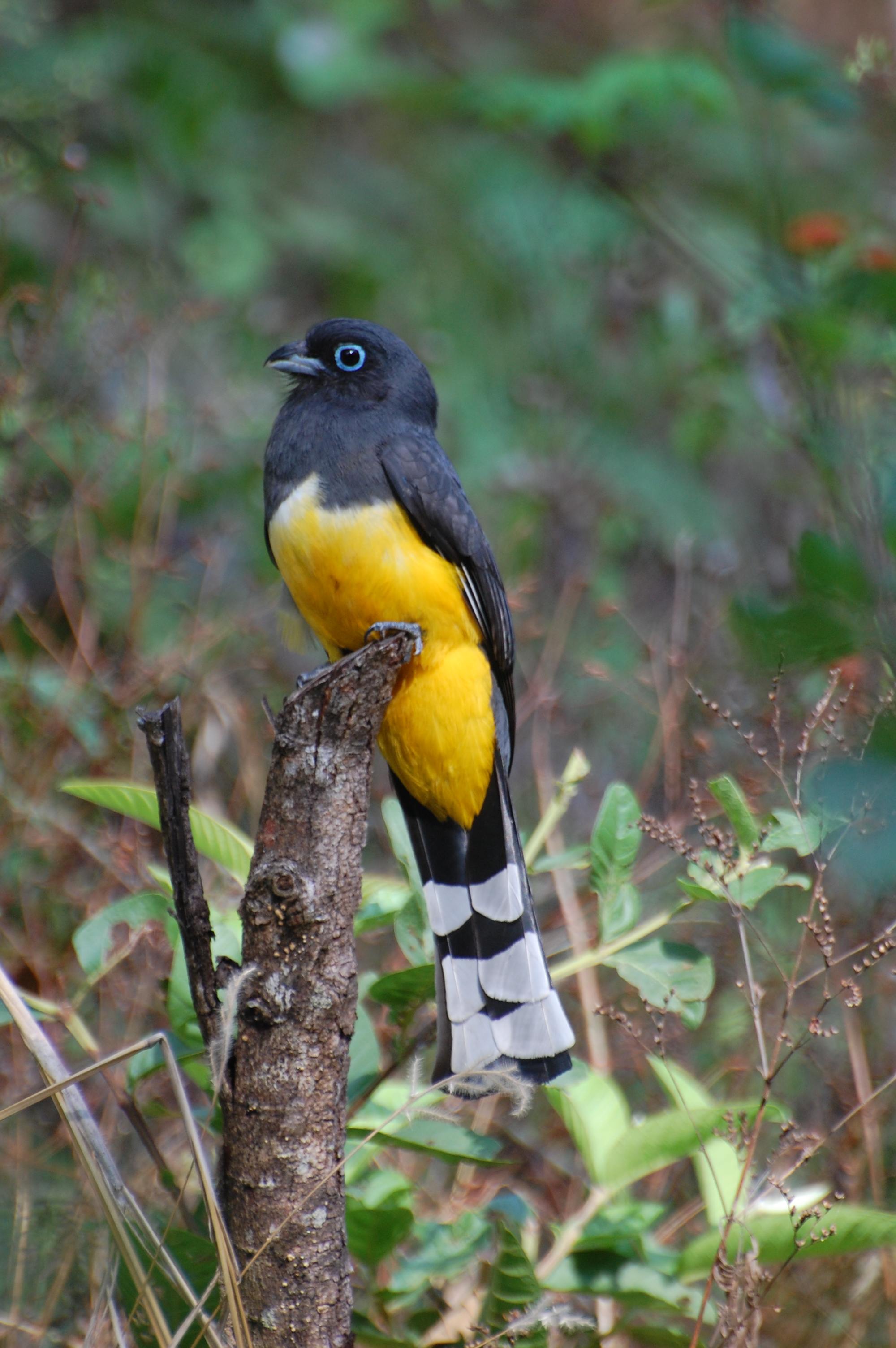
Male black-headed trogon showing undertail pattern

== Description ==
The black-headed trogon is 27 to 28 cm (11 to 11 in) long and weighs about 74 to 95 g (2.6 to 3.4 oz). Adults of both sexes have slate-black to black head, neck, and chest. A sky-blue ring of bare skin surrounds the dark eye. A thin white line separates the chest from the rest of their underparts, which are cadmium to chrome yellow that becomes lighter at the vent area. The two inner pairs of tail feathers are metallic bronze breen to bluish green with black tips. The next pair are all black and the outermost three pairs are black with wide white tips. Their wings are slate black with some white. Adult males' upperparts are bright metallic bluish green to golden green with metallic blue to bluish violet rump and uppertail coverts. Adult females replace the male's metallic upperparts with dark slate.

Immature males have a mostly black tail with a limited amount of white and their wings have more white than adults'. Immature females' tails lack the black tips on the inner tail feathers, and like immature males also have less white on the tail than adults.

== Distribution and habitat ==
The black-headed trogon is found on the Caribbean slope from southern Veracruz in Mexico south through Belize, northern Guatemala, and northern Honduras to central Nicaragua. It is also found on the Pacific slope from El Salvador through southern Honduras and western Nicaragua into northwestern Costa Rica. The species inhabits a variety of forest types including wet and moist tropical forest, pinelands, gallery forest, secondary forest, and dry forest. It favors the forest edges rather than the dense interior and is also found in other semi-open to open landscapes including banana and cacao plantations, gardens, and suburban areas. In elevation it usually is found between sea level and 600 m (2,000 ft) but does occur as high as 1,000 m (3,300 ft)

== Behavior ==
=== Movement ===
The black-headed trogon is non-migratory.

=== Social behavior ===
The black-headed trogon often gathers in mixed-sex groups of up to 12 individuals. Usually there are more males than females, leading to speculation that the assemblage is a form of lek mating.

=== Feeding ===
The black-headed trogon typically forages from the mid-story to the canopy, often along the forest edges and in gaps. The adult's diet is fruit and arthropods that it collects while hovering after short sallies from a perch. It returns to the perch to eat. Nestlings are fed arthropods almost exclusively, especially larvae.

=== Breeding ===
The black-headed trogon's breeding season varies across its range but appears to be within the March to July period. All of the known nests were in the active termitaria of Nasutitermes termites. Both sexes excavate the nest cavity, sometimes from the bottom of the termite nest and sometimes horizontally in the side. Nest heights ranged from near the ground to 5 m (20 ft) up. The clutch size appears to be three eggs. Both parents incubate the eggs for about 17 to 19 days and fledging occurs about 16 or 17 days after hatch.

=== Vocalization ===
The black-headed trogon is vocal and often detected by its calls. The most common call is " a loud series of 15-20 accelerating clucks or 'cuck' notes". It is sometimes sung by a pair as a duet and also by small groups of individuals. The species' alarm call is "a single low 'cuck'".

== Status ==
The IUCN has assessed the black-headed trogon as being of Least Concern. It has a large range but its population size is not known and believed to be decreasing. No immediate threats have been identified. It is considered common in most of its range and "is more flexible in its habitat requirements than other trogons, tolerating degraded forests and human-managed landscapes (pastures, farmland, plantations)."
