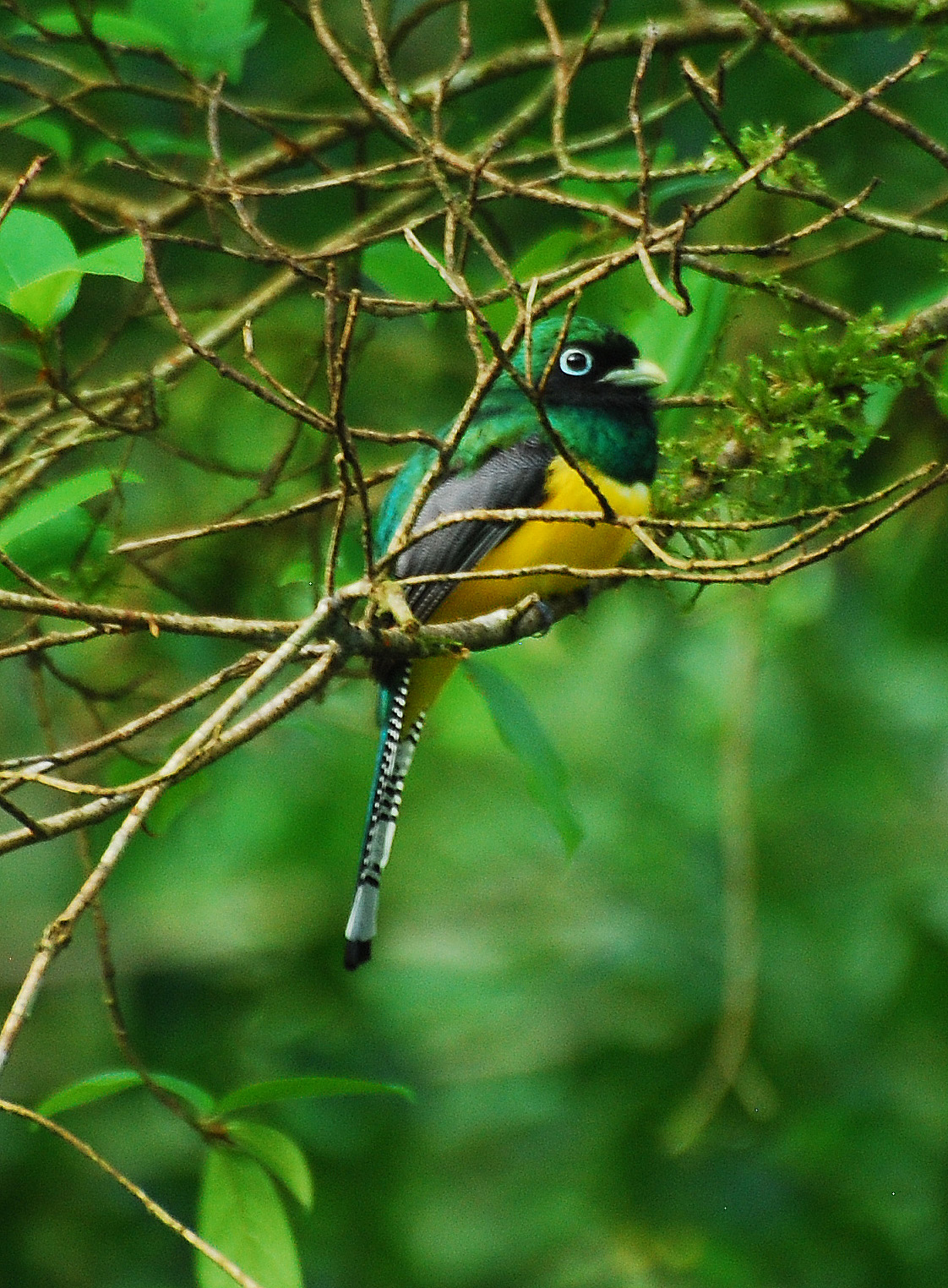
- Adult male in Costa Rica
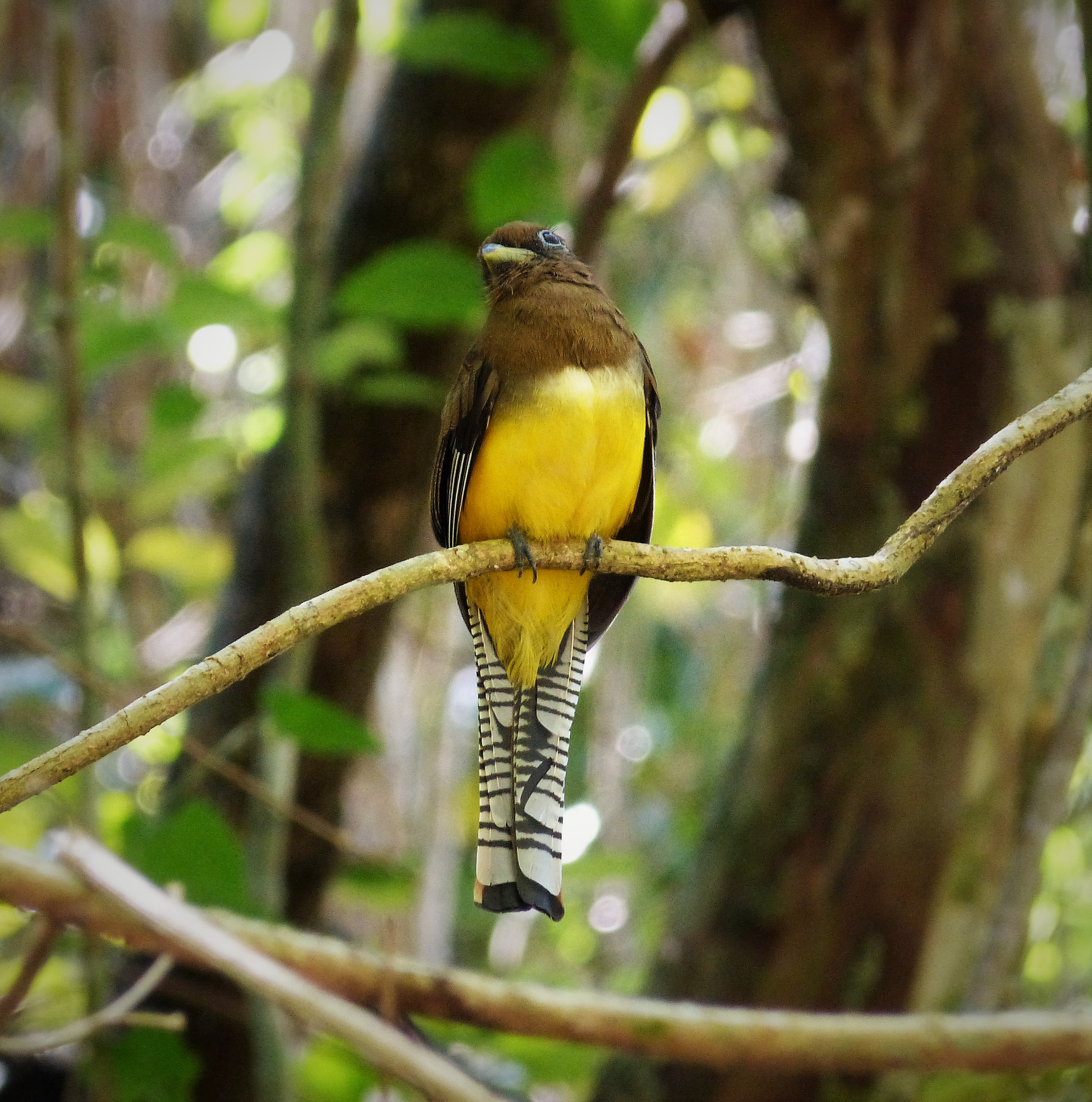
- Adult female in Panama

Scientific classification
- Kingdom: Animalia
- Phylum: Chordata
- Class: Aves
- Order: Trogoniformes
- Family: Trogonidae
- Genus: Trogon
- Species: T. tenellus

Binomial name
- Trogon tenellus Cabanis, 1862

= Graceful black-throated trogon =

Species of bird

The graceful black-throated trogon (Trogon tenellus), also known as the northern black-throated trogon, is a bird in the family Trogonidae, the trogons and quetzals. It is found from southeastern Honduras to northwestern Colombia.

== Taxonomy and systematics ==
What is now the graceful black-throated trogon was long treated as one of six subspecies of the then "black-throated trogon" (Trogon rufus sensu lato). Starting in 2022, the South American Classification Committee of the American Ornithological Society (AOS), the International Ornithological Congress, and the Clements taxonomy split the black-throated trogon into four species, one of them being the graceful black-throated trogon. In this split Trogon rufus was renamed the Amazonian black-throated trogon. However, as of 2024 the North American Classification Committee of the AOS and BirdLife International's Handbook of the Birds of the World (HBW) have not recognized the split, retaining the six-subspecies black-throated trogon.

The graceful black-throated trogon is monotypic.

== Description ==
Like most trogons, the graceful black-throated has distinctive male and female plumages with soft colorful feathers. This relatively small species is about 23 to 26 cm (9.1 to 10 in) long and weighs 50 to 59 g (1.8 to 2.1 oz). Adult males have a black face and throat with a pale blue ring of bare skin around their eye. They are metallic green on their crown, back, lesser wing coverts, and rump. Their uppertail coverts are bluish. Their flight feathers, primary coverts, and secondary coverts are various patterns of black and white. The upper side of their central pair of tail feathers is bluish with wide black tips. The next two pairs are similar with the addition of black inner webs. The outermost three pairs have black bases, white tips, and black and white bars between. The underside of their tail has black and white bars and a wide white tip. Their upper breast is metallic green and their lower breast and belly are yellow, sometimes with a thin white band below the upper breast. Adult females have mostly brown upperparts; their crown is darker and their rump and uppertail coverts lighter. Their face is brown with a whitish to pale blue ring of bare skin around their eye. Their primaries are mostly fuscous-black with a narrow white edge on their outer webs. Their secondaries and their greater and median coverts are copper with a dusky tinge. Their lesser wing coverts are black with brown tips. The upper side of their central pair of tail feathers is rufous-brown to chestnut with narrow black tips and a faint cinnamon-buff band between the colors. The next two pairs are black with rufous-brown edges. The outermost three pairs have black bases, white tips, and black and white bars between. The underside of their tail has black and white bars and a wide white tip. Their throat and upper breast are a paler brown than their back with a white band below the upper breast. Their lower breast and belly are yellow. Males have a mostly bright yellow to yellow-green bill; females' bills are highly variable from black with some yellow to dusky yellow with some black. All ages of both sexes have a dark brown iris. Adults' legs and feet are bluish gray; those of nestlings and juveniles can be pinkish.

== Distribution and habitat ==
The graceful black-throated trogon is found on the Caribbean slope from northern Honduras south through Nicaragua and Costa Rica to Panama, and on the Pacific slope from central Costa Rica to Panama. Its range continues through Panama on both slopes into far northwestern Colombia's Chocó Department. It primarily inhabits humid primary forest, and from Costa Rica south adds mature secondary forest. In elevation it ranges from sea level to about 400 m (1,300 ft) in northern Central America, mostly to about 900 m (3,000 ft) but as high as 1,200 m (3,900 ft) in Costa Rica, and mostly up to 750 m (2,500 ft) but as high as 1,200 m (3,900 ft) in Panama.

== Behavior ==
"Trogons and quetzals perch erectly with tail hanging downward, and they may remain motionless and quiet for protracted periods." (emphasis in original)

=== Movement ===
The graceful black-throated trogon is a year-round resident throughout its range, though it possibly moves downslope at times of heavy rain.

=== Feeding ===
The graceful black-throated trogon feeds primarily on insects and also includes fruit in its diet. It typically feeds in the forest understory to mid-story. It usually captures insects and plucks fruit by sallying or hovering from a perch and returning to it or another perch to eat. It has been observed following troops of Central American squirrel monkeys (Saimiri oerstedii), apparently to capture prey disturbed by them.

=== Breeding ===
Most of the information about the graceful black-throated trogon's breeding biology comes from Costa Rica. Its breeding season begins with nest cavity excavation as early as mid-February; egg laying can be as late as June and July near sea level. Both members of a pair excavate a nest cavity in a decaying tree or stump, siting it as high as 6 m (20 ft) above the ground. They make no nest but can leave some wood chips at the cavity bottom. The clutch is two slightly glossy white eggs. Both parents incubate the clutch, typically the male for much of the day and the female at night. The incubation period is about 18 days and fledging occurs 14 to 15 days after hatch. Both parents provision and brood the nestlings.

=== Vocalization ===
The graceful black-throated trogon's song is "low, weak, mellow notes delivered in series of two or three, sometimes four, rarely up to six notes: cow cow or cow cow cow". The species' call is a "churr".

== Status ==
The IUCN follows HBW taxonomy and so has assessed the undivided black-throated trogon rather than separately assessing the graceful black-throated trogon.
