= Caripe Municipality =

Municipality in Monagas State, Venezuela

Caripe
- Municipality
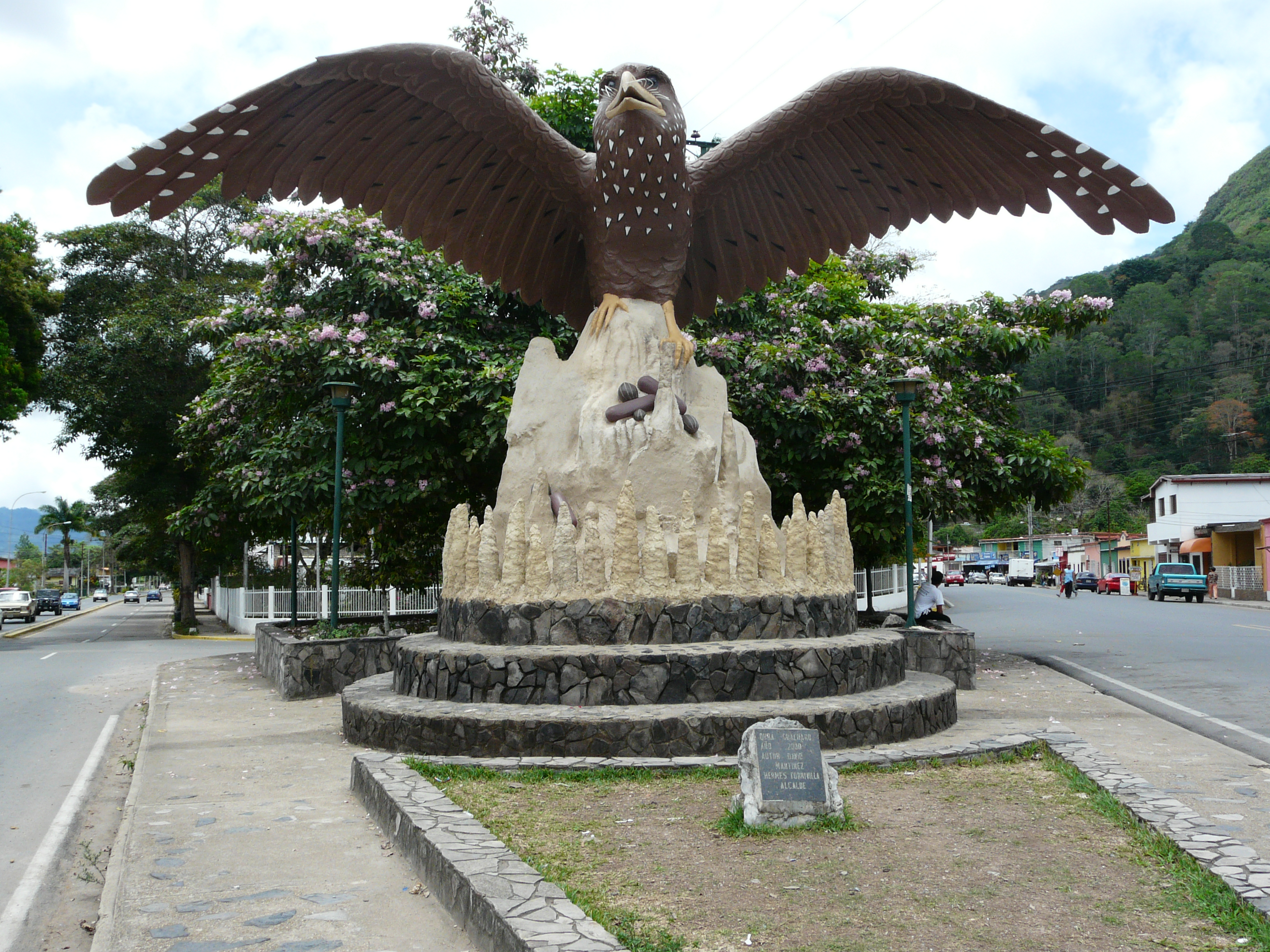

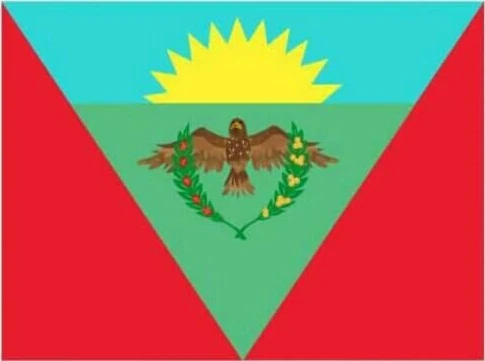
- Flag

- Location of Caripe Municipality in Monagas
- Coordinates: 10°04′10″N 63°11′59″W
- Country: Venezuela
- Monagas: State
- Founded: 1734
- Founder: Fray Pedro de Gelsa
- Seat: Caripe

Government
  - Mayor: Dalila Rosillo (PSUV)

Area
  - Total: 529 km^{2} (204 sq mi)

Population (2001)
  - Total: 31,336
  - Density: 59.2/km^{2} (153/sq mi)
- Time zone: UTC−4 (VET)
- Website: Alcaldía del Municipio Caripe

Caripe is one of the 13 municipalities of the state of Monagas, Venezuela. The municipality's capital is Caripe, and the Cueva del Guácharo National Park is its main tourist attraction. In the north it borders the state of Sucre, to the east is the municipality of Piar, to the south are the municipalities of Bolivar and Punceres and to the west is the municipality of Acosta.

== Culture ==
=== Public holidays ===
Carnivals: In February or March.

=== Cuisine ===
The dishes typical in Caripe are arepa and hot chocolate. The people drink rum of petals of roses.

== Politics and government ==
=== Mayors ===
- Luis Alirio Amundaray. (2004 - 2008, 2008 - 2013) PSUV.
- Ángel Rodríguez. (2013 - 2017) PSUV.
- Orangel Salazar. (2017 – 2021)
- Dalila Rosillo. (2021 – present)
