= Acosta Municipality =

Acosta Municipality may refer to:

- Acosta Municipality, Falcón
- Acosta Municipality, Monagas
