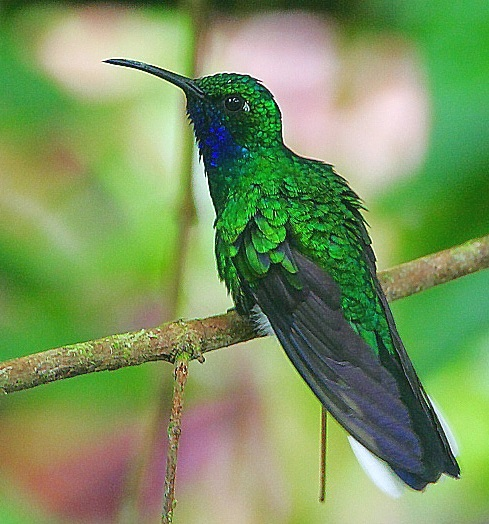

Conservation status
- Near Threatened (IUCN 3.1)
- CITES Appendix II

Scientific classification
- Kingdom: Animalia
- Phylum: Chordata
- Class: Aves
- Clade: Strisores
- Order: Apodiformes
- Family: Trochilidae
- Genus: Campylopterus
- Species: C. ensipennis

Binomial name
- Campylopterus ensipennis (Swainson, 1822)

= White-tailed sabrewing =

Species of hummingbird

The white-tailed sabrewing (Campylopterus ensipennis) is a Near Threatened species of hummingbird in the "emeralds", tribe Trochilini of subfamily Trochilinae. It is found on Tobago and in Venezuela.

== Taxonomy and systematics ==
The white-tailed sabrewing is monotypic.

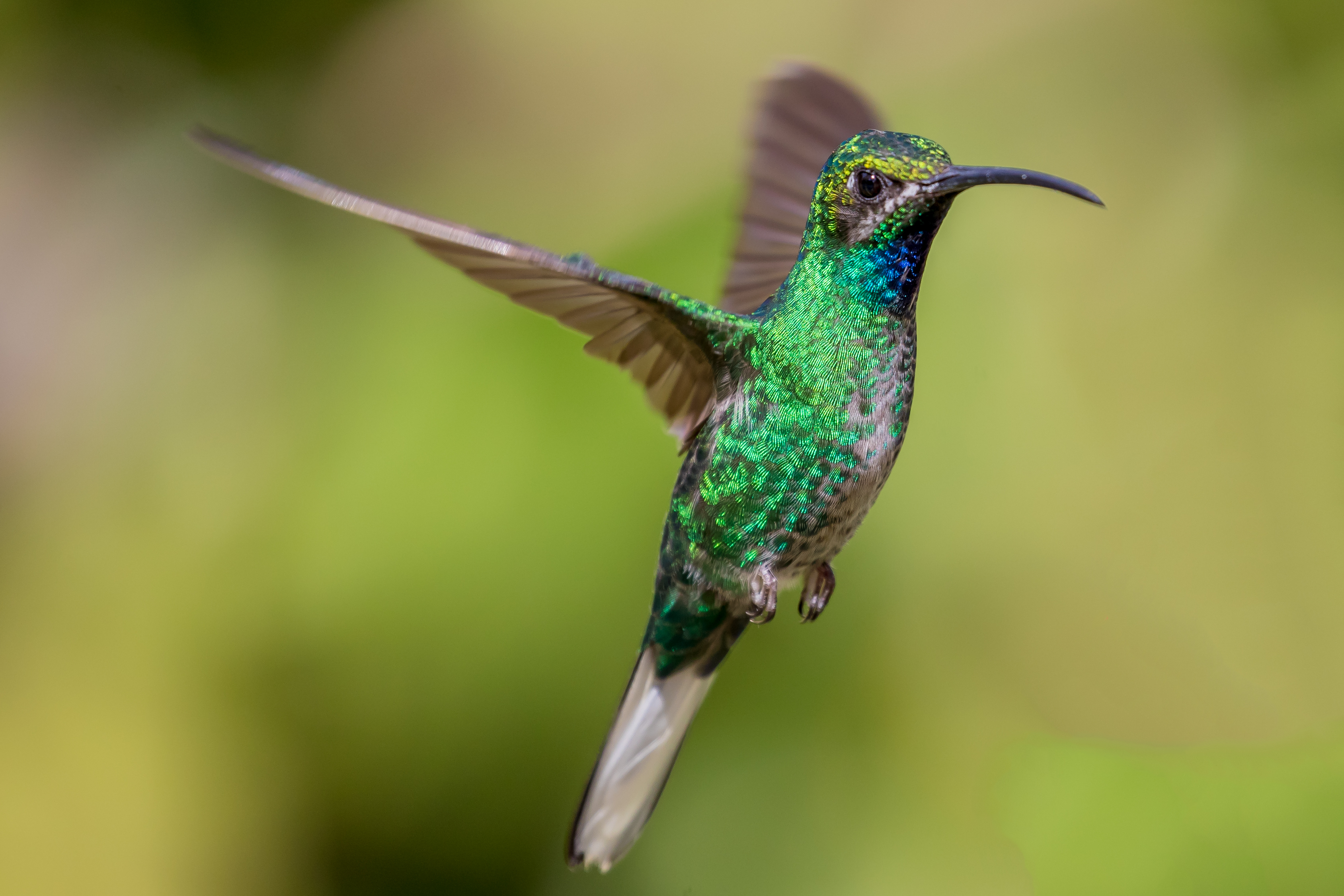
White-tailed sabrewing in Tobago

== Description ==
The white-tailed sabrewing is about 12 to 13 cm (4.7 to 5.1 in) long. Males weigh 9.5 to 10.5 g (0.34 to 0.37 oz) and females are assumed to be lighter. Both sexes have a black decurved bill and a white spot behind the eye. Males have glittering green upperparts, an iridescent blue to dark violet throat, and glittering green underparts. Their inner two pairs of tail feathers are dark bronzy green; the inner third of the length of the outer three pairs is black and the outer two thirds white. Females are similar but the blue of their throat is smaller and duller and their underparts are pale gray with green spots on the flanks.

The shafts of the outer flight feathers are thickened and flattened which gives the distinctive feature of the sabrewings their English and genus names. In this case, both parts of the scientific name refer to this feature, Campylopterus and ensipennis being derived from the Greek and Latin respectively for "bent wing".

== Distribution and habitat ==
The white-tailed sabrewing is found in two locations in Venezuela, the Cordillera de Caripe and the Paria Peninsula, and also on Tobago. The Tobago population was almost extirpated by Hurricane Flora in 1963 but it appears to have somewhat recovered. The species inhabits montane forest, mature secondary forest, and plantations, especially those of coffee. In elevation it ranges between 400 and 2,000 m (1,300 and 6,600 ft) but on the mainland is most common between 1,000 and 1,600 m (3,300 and 5,200 ft) and all nest records on Tobago are between 300 and 520 m (980 and 1,700 ft).

== Behavior ==
=== Movement ===
The white-tailed sabrewing has no documented movement pattern, but appears to make seasonal elevational changes at least on Tobago.

=== Feeding ===
The white-tailed sabrewing forages for nectar mostly between the low and middle strata of the forest but in more open landscapes also in treetops. Its diet includes a wide variety of flowering plants. It both trap-lines and defends feeding territories. In addition to nectar, it captures small insects (such as ants and wasps) and spiders by hawking from perches.

=== Breeding ===
The white-tailed sabrewing's breeding season on Tobago spans from late January to April; it is unknown in Venezuela. Males display to females at leks. The nest is a large (for hummingbirds) cup made mostly of moss with some other plant material. It is placed as a saddle on a horizontal branch or is attached to the end of a hanging twig. It is sited up to 11 m (36 ft) above the ground and often near running water. The incubation length and time to fledging are not known.

=== Vocalization ===
The male white-tailed sabrewing sings "a persistently given, comparatively loud and slightly bisyllabic 'tzchink'", typically from a perch within the forest and 2 to 6 m (7 to 20 ft) above the ground.

== Status ==
The IUCN originally assessed the white-tailed sabrewing as Threatened, then in 1994 as Vulnerable, and since 2004 as Near Threatened. It has a small range and its estimated population of between 50,000 and 100,000 mature individuals is believed to be decreasing. Though its habitat is not severely fragmented, its degradation is the likely cause of the decline. In Venezuela it is fairly common to common in two national parks, but protection there is only nominal due to under-funding.
