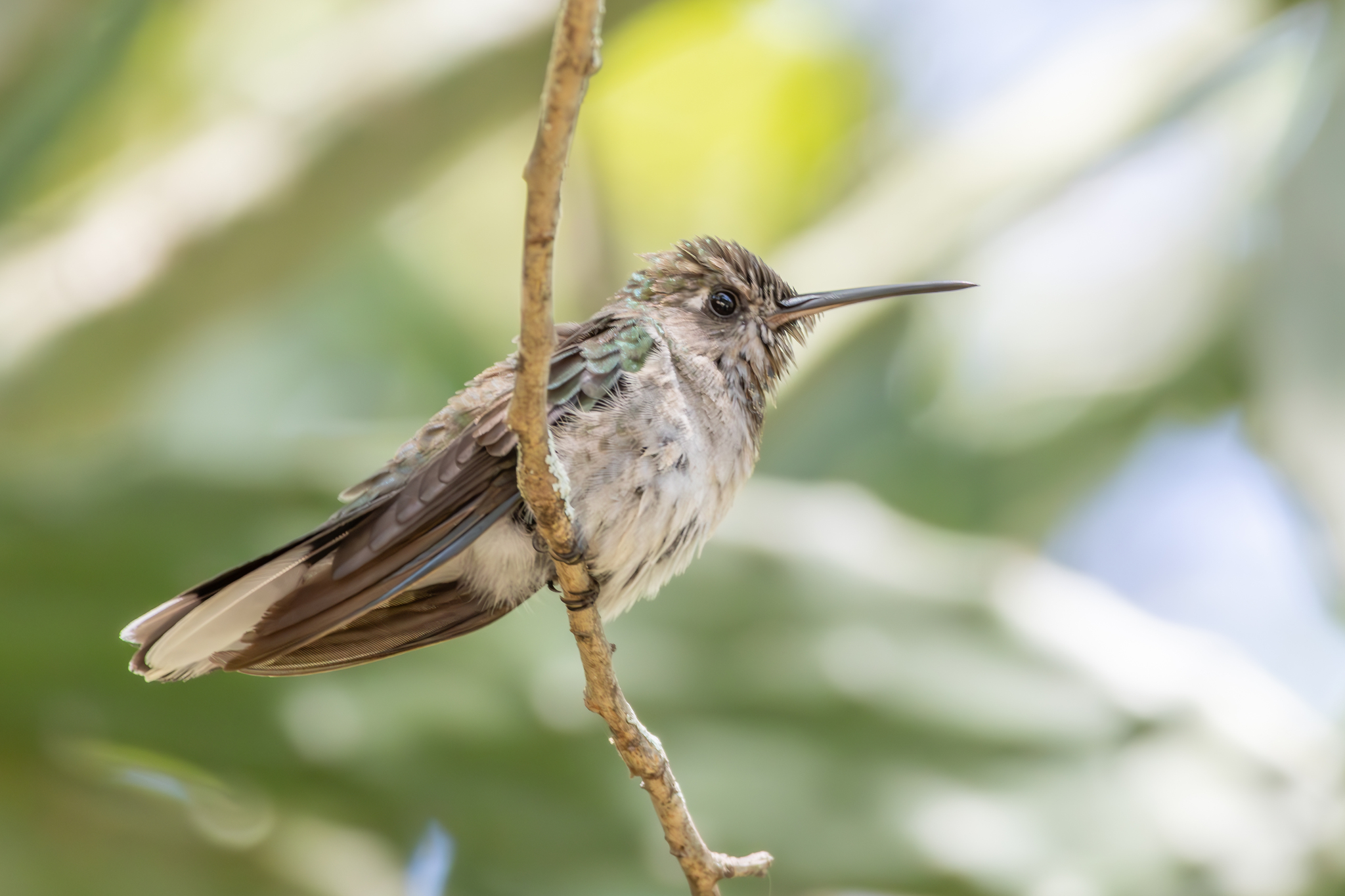

Conservation status
- Vulnerable (IUCN 3.1)
- CITES Appendix II

Scientific classification
- Kingdom: Animalia
- Phylum: Chordata
- Class: Aves
- Clade: Strisores
- Order: Apodiformes
- Family: Trochilidae
- Genus: Campylopterus
- Species: C. calcirupicola

Binomial name
- Campylopterus calcirupicola Lopes, de Vasconcelos & Gonzaga, 2017

= Outcrop sabrewing =

Species of hummingbird

The outcrop sabrewing or dry-forest sabrewing (Campylopterus calcirupicola) is a vulnerable species of hummingbird in the "emeralds", tribe Trochilini of subfamily Trochilinae. It is endemic to eastern Brazil.

== Taxonomy and systematics ==
What is now the outcrop sabrewing was treated as part of the diamantinensis subspecies of the grey-breasted sabrewing (Campylopterus largipennis). In a 2017 paper Lopes et al. provided convincing evidence that both the outcrop sabrewing and diamantinensis sensu stricto deserved species status. The South American Classification Committee of the American Ornithological Society and worldwide taxonomic systems agreed, recognizing the outcrop and Diamantina sabrewings. Both are monotypic.

== Description ==
The outcrop sabrewing is very similar to its "parents", the grey-breasted and especially the Diamantina sabrewings. Males weigh about 7.0 g (0.25 oz) and females 5.9 g (0.21 oz). The sexes have almost identical plumage. Their bill is long and slightly decurved. Their upperparts are bright bronze green with coppery reflections on the darker crown. They have a white spot behind the eye. Their underparts are pale gray that lightens to whitish on the abdomen and light gray on the undertail coverts. Their central pair of tail feathers is bright bronze green, the next pair bright bronze green with a dark olive gray spot at the end, and the rest have bright bronze green bases, narrow dark olive gray bands near the tip, and white tips.

== Distribution and habitat ==
The outcrop sabrewing is found only in a small part of eastern Brazil. It is known from northeastern Goiás, southwestern Bahia, and northern Minas Gerais, and suspected to also be found in southeastern Tocantins and southern Piauí. Though exact details of its habitat requirements have not been determined, it is known mostly from dry forests on limestone outcrops and calcareous soils derived from them. It is known only in a very limited elevational range between 460 and 880 m (1,500 and 2,900 ft).

== Behavior ==
=== Movement ===
The outcrop sabrewing's movements, if any, have not been documented.

=== Feeding ===
The outcrop sabrewing's foraging strategy and diet are poorly known, but it does take nectar from a variety of native and introduced plant species.

=== Breeding ===
The outcrop sabrewing's breeding season appears to span from May to December, but nothing else is known about its breeding phenology. Its nest and eggs have not been described.

=== Vocalization ===
The outcrop sabrewing's vocalizations have not been put into words, but recordings are available in xeno-canto and the Cornell Lab of Ornithology's Macaulay Library.

== Status ==
The IUCN has assessed the outcrop sabrewing as Vulnerable. It has a very limited range and habitat requirements. Its estimated population of between 2400 and 15,000 mature individuals is believed to be decreasing. Though forest in much of its range has been altered or destroyed, the outcrop areas are not very desirable for agriculture. Mining and hydroelectric power projects do pose future threats. Parts of its range are protected in one national and one state park.
