= Piar Municipality =

Piar Municipality may refer to:

- Piar Municipality, Bolívar
- Piar Municipality, Monagas
