= Buff-breasted sabrewing =

Conservation status
- Least Concern (IUCN 3.1)
- CITES Appendix II

Scientific classification
- Kingdom: Animalia
- Phylum: Chordata
- Class: Aves
- Order: Apodiformes
- Family: Trochilidae
- Genus: Campylopterus
- Species: C. duidae

Binomial name
- Campylopterus duidae Chapman, 1929

Species of hummingbird

The buff-breasted sabrewing (Campylopterus duidae), or sometimes Duida sabrewing, is a species of hummingbird in the "emeralds", tribe Trochilini of subfamily Trochilinae. It is found in Brazil and Venezuela.

== Taxonomy and systematics ==
Some authors have placed the buff-breasted sabrewing by itself in genus Loxopterus. It has also been treated as conspecific with the rufous-breasted sabrewing (C. hyperythrus), as forming a superspecies with it, or as the two being sister species. Of the major worldwide taxonomic systems, none have adopted the first three treatments and only the Clements taxonomy has adopted the last.

The buff-breasted sabrewing has two subspecies, the nominate C. d. duidae and C. d. guaiquinimae.

== Description ==
The buff-breasted sabrewing is about 10 to 13 cm (3.9 to 5.1 in) long and weighs 5 to 7 g (0.18 to 0.25 oz). Males and females have essentially the same plumage. Both have a straight black bill. Their upperparts are shining bronze-green that is somewhat greener on the head. Their underparts are drab grayish with a tawny tint on the sides. Their central tail feathers are bronze and the outer ones have dull bronze bases and orangy red ends. Subspecies C. d. guaiquinimae has a slightly different green to the upperparts compared to the nominate, and a darker tail.

== Distribution and habitat ==
The nominate subspecies of buff-breasted sabrewing is found on the tepuis (isolated table mountains) of southern Venezuela and adjacent northern Brazil. Subspecies C. d. guaiquinimae is found only on Cerro Guaiquinima in southern Venezuela. The species inhabits the foothills and lower elevation evergreen montane forest and the higher elevation scrublands on the tepuis. In elevation it ranges between 1,200 and 1,700 m (3,900 and 5,600 ft).

== Behavior ==
=== Movement ===
The buff-breasted sabrewing is a year-round resident in its habitat.

=== Feeding ===
The buff-breasted sabrewing forages from the understory to the mid-strata for nectar and small arthropods.

=== Breeding ===
Nests of buff-breasted sabrewings have been noted between about 2 and 3 m (7 and 10 ft) of the ground but no other information is known about its breeding phenology.

=== Vocalization ===
The buff-breasted sabrewing's song has not been described in words. Its calls include "somewhat buzzy chipping notes 'chzzi' [and] a longer chattering series 'chi-zizi' or 'chizizizizizizi'."

== Status ==
The IUCN has assessed the buff-breasted sabrewing as being of Least Concern, though it has a very limited range and its population size is unknown and believed to be decreasing. It is, however, considered common in that small range.
