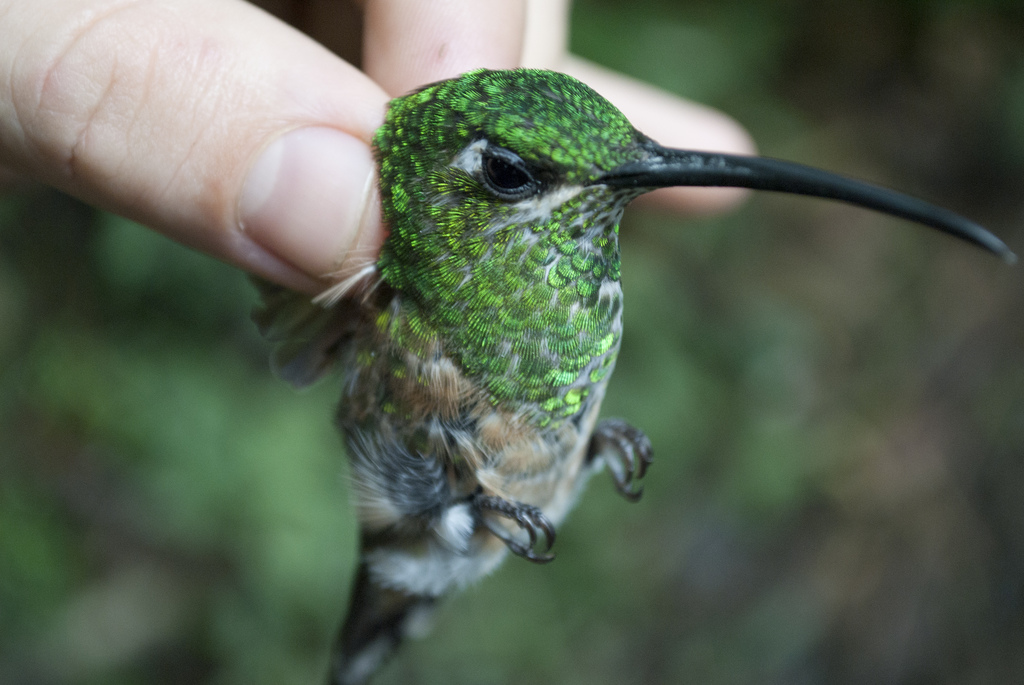
- Lazuline sabrewing, Campylopterus falcatus

Conservation status
- Least Concern (IUCN 3.1)
- CITES Appendix II

Scientific classification
- Kingdom: Animalia
- Phylum: Chordata
- Class: Aves
- Order: Apodiformes
- Family: Trochilidae
- Genus: Campylopterus
- Species: C. falcatus

Binomial name
- Campylopterus falcatus (Swainson, 1821)
- Range of C. falcatus

= Lazuline sabrewing =

Species of hummingbird

The lazuline sabrewing (Campylopterus falcatus) is a species of hummingbird in the "emeralds", tribe Trochilini of subfamily Trochilinae. It is found in Colombia, Ecuador, and Venezuela.

== Taxonomy and systematics ==
The lazuline sabrewing is monotypic.

== Description ==
The lazuline sabrewing is about 11.5 to 13 cm (4.5 to 5.1 in) long and weighs 6.4 to 8 g (0.23 to 0.28 oz). Both sexes have a black decurved bill and a white spot behind the eye. Males' upperparts are glittering green that is bluer on the crown. Their throat and breast are glittering dark violet-blue that becomes glittering blue towards the green belly. Their tail is chestnut with wide bronze-green tips on the central pair of feathers. Females' upperparts are like the male's. They have a glittering bluish throat and the rest of their underparts are pale gray with green spots on the flanks. Their tail is like the male's except there is less green at the tips of the central feathers.

== Distribution and habitat ==
The lazuline sabrewing is found in the mountains of north-central and western Venezuela, the Sierra de Perijá on the Venezuela-Colombia border, the Sierra Nevada de Santa Marta and Eastern Andes of Colombia, and into Ecuador as far south as Napo Province. It inhabits semi-deciduous montane forest, the edges of plantations, the lower reaches of páramo, and gardens. In elevation it generally ranges between 900 and 3,000 m (3,000 and 9,800 ft). In Venezuela it is most common between 1,200 and 2,300 m (3,900 and 7,500 ft) and has been recorded as low as 450 m (1,500 ft) in Colombia.

== Behavior ==
=== Movement ===
The lazuline sabrewing is believed to be sedentary.

=== Feeding ===
The lazuline sabrewing forages for nectar mostly from the understory to the forest's mid level, usually by trap-lining but sometimes also defending patches of flowers. In addition to nectar, it also feeds on insects captured in the air or gleaned from vegetation.

=== Breeding ===
The lazuline sabrewing's breeding season in the Sierra de Perijá appears to include June and in northern Venezuela probably includes October. Nothing else is known about its breeding phenology.

=== Vocalization ===
The male lazuline sabrewing sings "chik, it, chik, it splek, chat, seet, chik, seet, chik, it, chik, it..., etc., with many variations", usually from a somewhat exposed perch at medium height.

== Status ==
The IUCN has assessed the lazuline sabrewing as being of Least Concern, though its population size and trend are unknown. No immediate threats have been identified. In the northern Andes it is considered uncommon and patchily distributed. It is somewhat sensitive to habitat changes, but "readily accepts man-made habitats like flowering gardens and plantations" and occurs in many protected areas.
