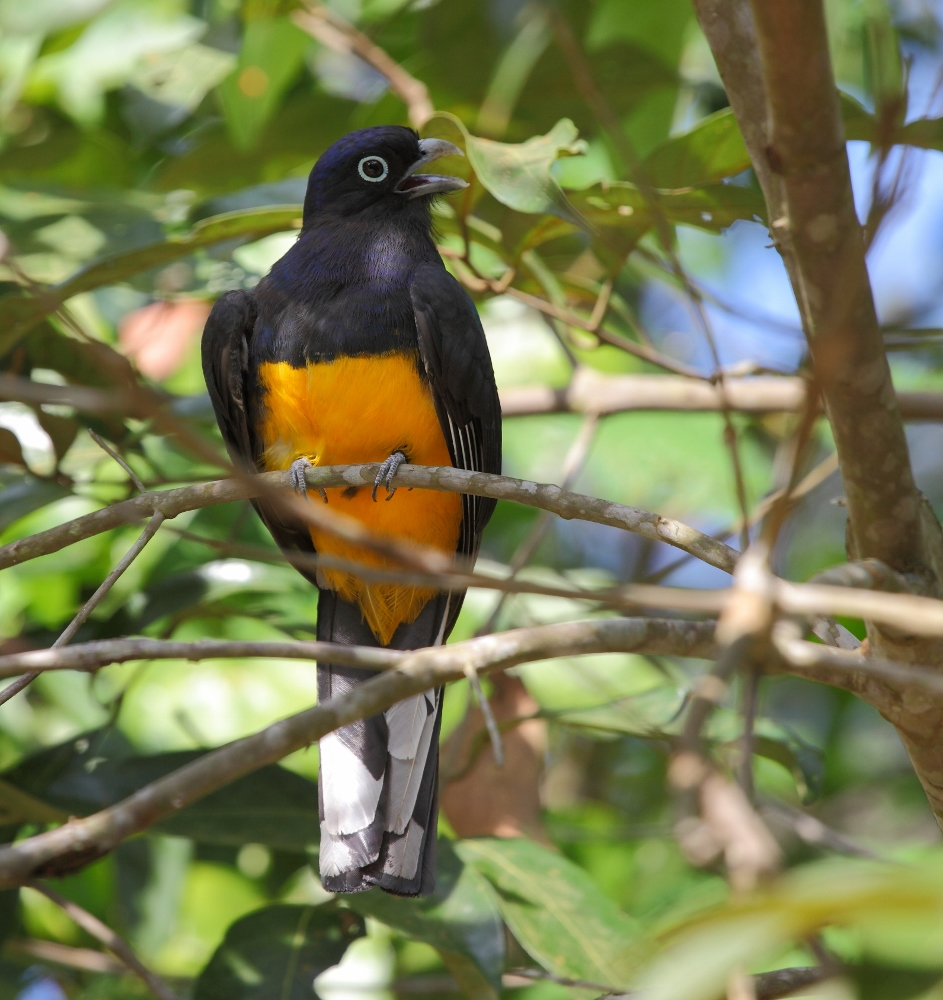
- male at Bertioga, São Paulo State, Brazil
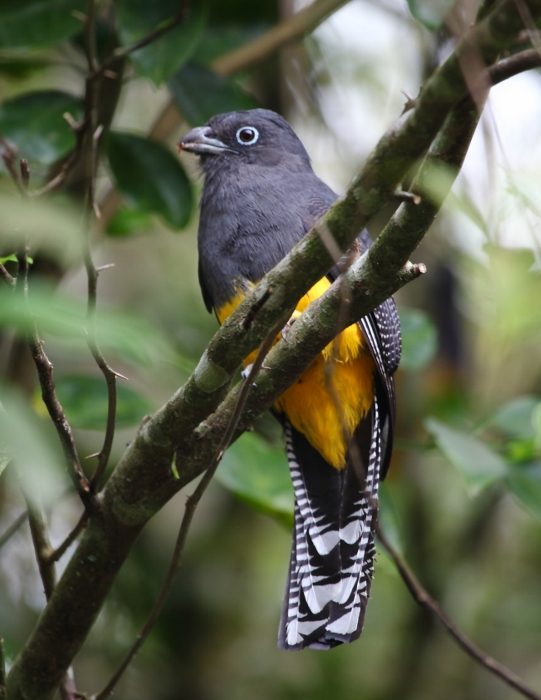
- female at Bertioga, São Paulo State, Brazil

Conservation status
- Least Concern (IUCN 3.1)

Scientific classification
- Kingdom: Animalia
- Phylum: Chordata
- Class: Aves
- Order: Trogoniformes
- Family: Trogonidae
- Genus: Trogon
- Species: T. viridis

Binomial name
- Trogon viridis Linnaeus, 1766

Synonyms
- Trogon strigilatus

= Green-backed trogon =

Species of bird

The green-backed trogon (Trogon viridis), also known as the Amazonian white-tailed trogon, is a bird in the trogon family Trogonidae. It is widely distributed across the Amazon rainforest with a disjunct population on the southeast coast of Brazil. As with all trogons, this species is sexually dimorphic. The male has a yellow belly without a white breastband, a blue head with a pale-blue orbital eye-ring, a blue bill, a green back and a green tail that is mostly white below. The female is duller with a dark grey head, a dark grey back and some black barring beneath the tail.

== Taxonomy ==
The green-backed trogon was formally described by the Swedish naturalist Carl Linnaeus in 1766 in the twelfth edition of his Systema Naturae. He placed it with the other trogons in the genus Trogon and coined the binomial name Trogon viridis. Linnaeus based his description on "Le couroucou verd de Cayenne" that had been described and illustrated in 1760 by French zoologist Mathurin Jacques Brisson. The specific epithet viridis is the Latin word for "green". The species is monotypic: no subspecies are recognised.

On the same page of his Systema Naturae Linnaeus introduced the binomial name Trogon strigilatus for the female of this species. He based his description on Brisson's "Couroucou cendré de Cayenne". Although in 1945 James L. Peters used the epithet strigilatus rather that viridis in his Check-List of Birds of the World, the epithet viridis is now the accepted name.

The green-backed trogon and the white-tailed trogon (T. chionurus) were formerly treated as conspecific under the common name "white-tailed trogon". A molecular phylogenetic study published in 2008 found that the chionurus samples from west Ecuador and Panama were more closely related to Baird's trogon (T. bairdii) than they were to the viridis samples from the east of the Andes. Based on this result and the plumage differences, the species was split and chionurus was promoted to species status. The nominate subspecies viridis was given the new common name "green-backed trogon" while chionurus retained the name "white-tailed trogon".

== Description ==
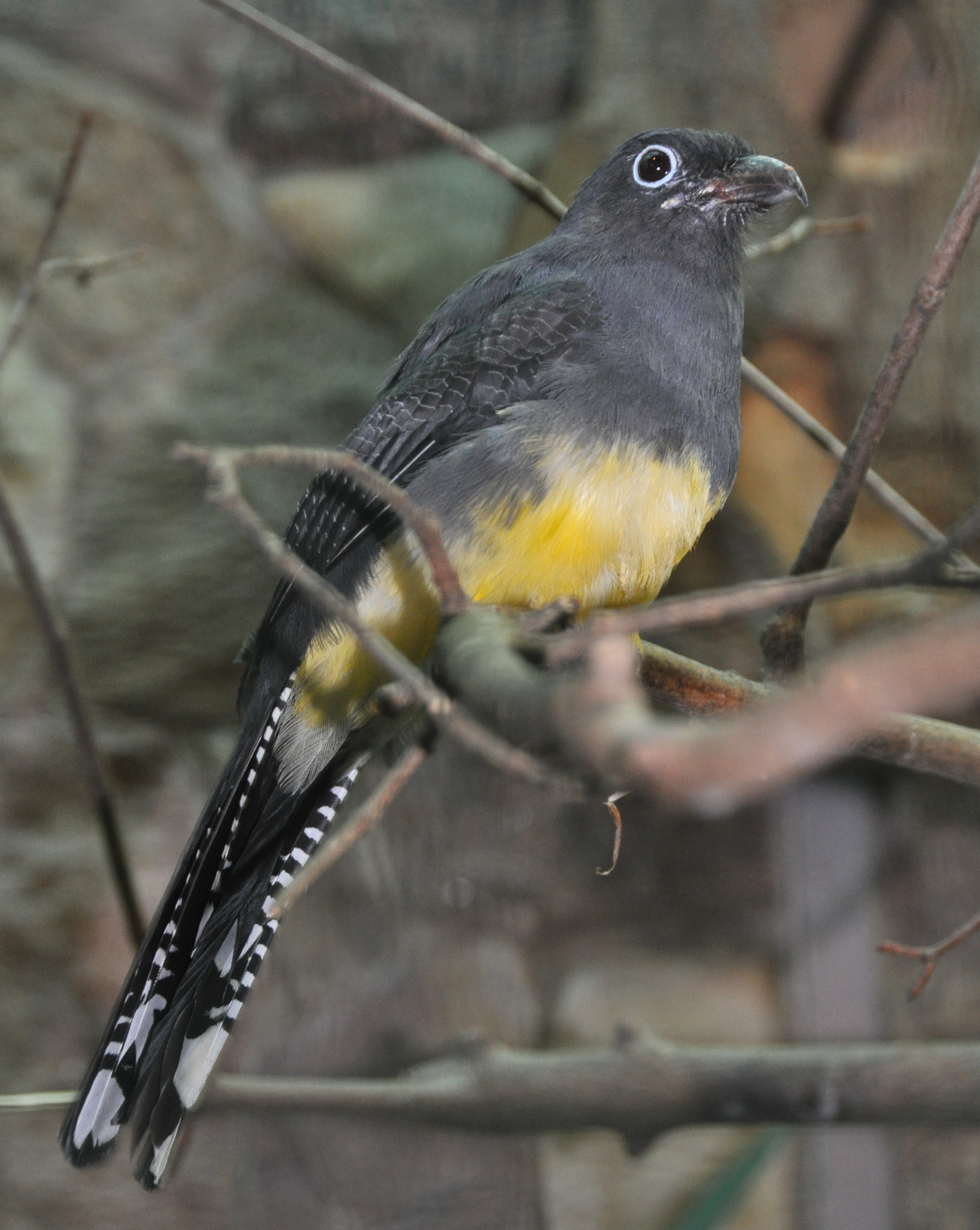
Female with abnormally dark bill

This relatively large trogon is 28 to 30 centimetres (11 to 12 in) long. As most trogons, it is strongly sexually dimorphic. In the male the head and upper breast are dark blue (appears blackish in poor light), and the back is green. The lower underparts are orange yellow. The wings are black, vermiculated with white. The undertail is black and white: Each feather has a broad black base and a broad white tip and outer edge. The complete eye-ring is pale bluish. The female green-backed trogon resembles the male, but has a grey back, head and breast, and distinct black-and-white barring mainly to the outer webs of each tail feather.

For comparison, the similar but smaller violaceous trogon has a yellow (male) or incomplete white eye-ring (female), and the male also has barring to the undertail.

There is no overlap in the distribution of the green-backed and white-tailed trogons, but the two can be separated by the undertail pattern: Unlike the green-backed trogon, the male white-tailed trogon only has a very narrow black base to each feather (the undertail appears almost entirely white), and the female mainly has black-and-white barring to the inner webs of each feather (can be difficult to see). The male white-tailed trogon also has a bluer rump than the green-backed trogon.

The song of the green-backed trogon consists of about 20 cow notes that start slow, but accelerate towards the end. The song is slower than the white-tailed trogon, and higher pitched than the black-tailed trogon.

== Distribution and habitat ==
It is found in tropical humid forests in South America, where its range includes the Amazon, the Guiana Shield, Trinidad, and the Atlantic Forest in eastern Brazil. It is a resident of humid tropical forests, and is typically the commonest trogon in its range.

== Behavior and ecology ==
They typically perch upright and motionless. Although their flight is fast, they are reluctant to fly any distance. Their broad bills and weak legs reflect their diet and arboreal habits. Green-backed trogons feed mainly on small fruit, supplemented by arthropods and lizards – slightly more so in the dry season when fruit are scarce, but even then they seem to be among the most frugivorous trogons in their range. They are consequently more rarely seen to attend mixed-species feeding flocks than other trogons.

It nests in a termite nest or a hole in a rotten tree. The nest is usually if not always built by the female which excavates an upward-sloping tunnel ending in a breeding chamber. The nesting season is apparently mainly during the summer months (June–August). The clutch is typically two or three white eggs. These are incubated for 16–17 days, with a further two weeks to fledging.

== Gallery ==
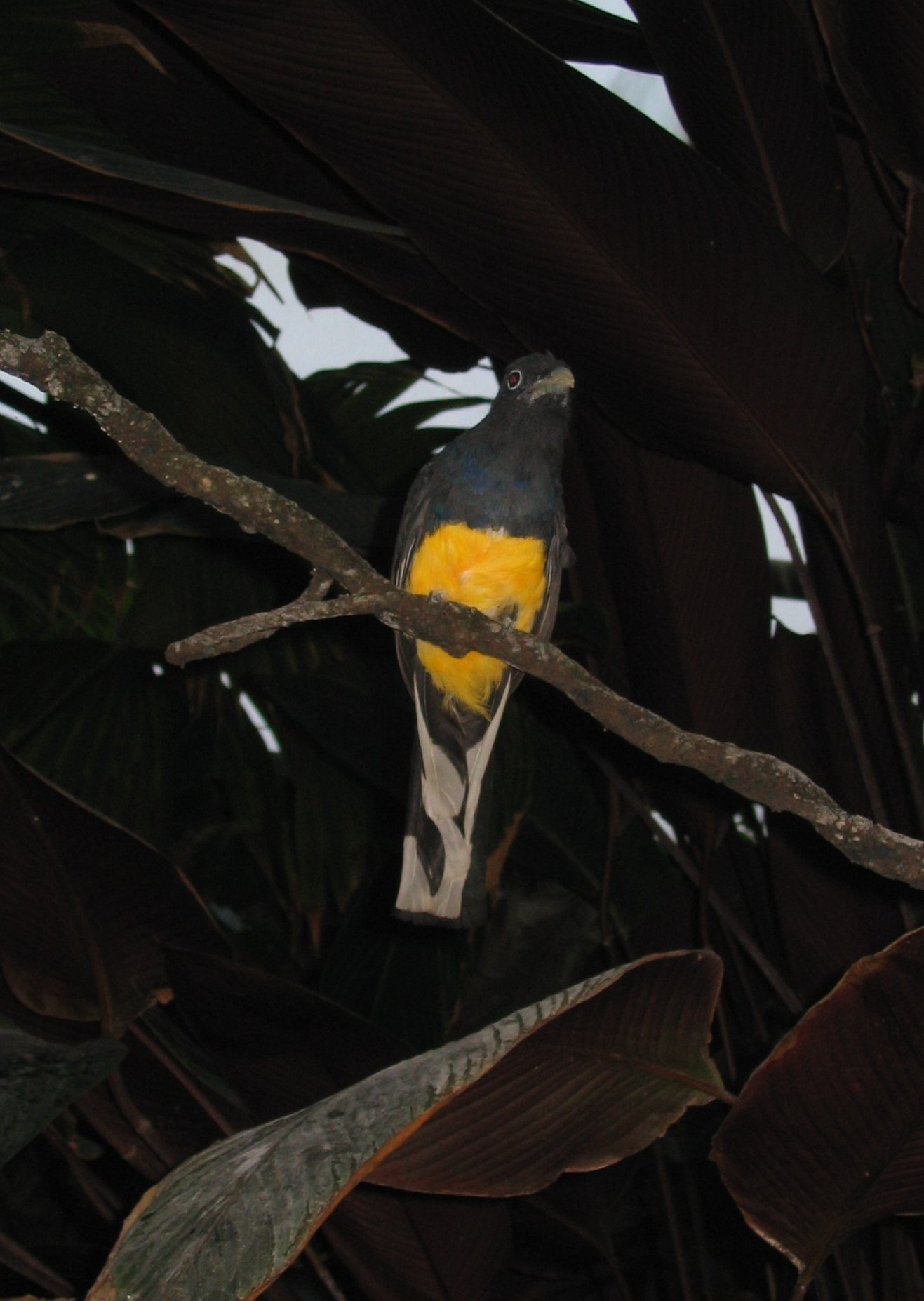
Male

== Sources ==
- Brisson, Mathurin Jacques (1760). Ornithologie, ou, Méthode Contenant la Division des Oiseaux en Ordres, Sections, Genres, Especes & leurs Variétés (in French and Latin). Vol. 4. Paris: Jean-Baptiste Bauche. The two stars (**) at the start of the section indicates that Brisson based his description on the examination of a specimen.
