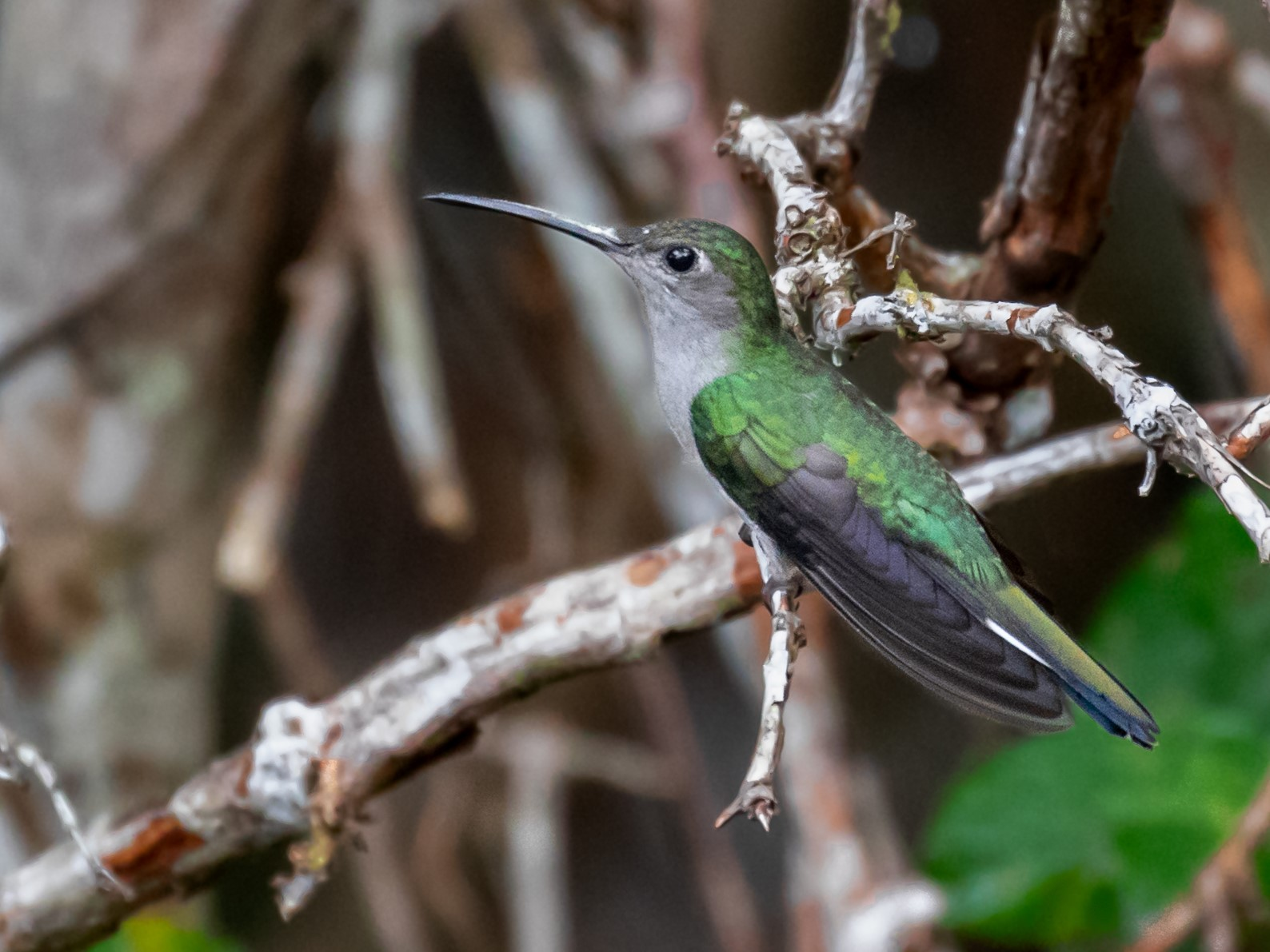
- Grey-breasted sabrewing in Amazonas, Brazil.

Conservation status
- Least Concern (IUCN 3.1)
- CITES Appendix II

Scientific classification
- Kingdom: Animalia
- Phylum: Chordata
- Class: Aves
- Clade: Strisores
- Order: Apodiformes
- Family: Trochilidae
- Genus: Campylopterus
- Species: C. largipennis

Binomial name
- Campylopterus largipennis (Boddaert, 1783)

= Grey-breasted sabrewing =

Species of hummingbird

The grey-breasted sabrewing (Campylopterus largipennis) is a species of hummingbird in the "emeralds", tribe Trochilini of subfamily Trochilinae. It is found in Bolivia, Brazil, Ecuador, the Guianas, Peru, and Venezuela.

== Taxonomy and systematics ==
The grey-breasted sabrewing was described by the French polymath Georges-Louis Leclerc, Comte de Buffon in 1780 in his Histoire Naturelle des Oiseaux from a specimen collected in Cayenne, French Guiana. The bird was also illustrated in a hand-colored plate engraved by François-Nicolas Martinet in the Planches Enluminées D'Histoire Naturelle which was produced under the supervision of Edme-Louis Daubenton to accompany Buffon's text. Neither the plate caption nor Buffon's description included a scientific name but in 1783 the Dutch naturalist Pieter Boddaert coined the binomial name Trochilus largipennis in his catalogue of the Planches Enluminées. The grey-breasted sabrewing is now placed in the genus Campylopterus that was erected by the English naturalist William Swainson in 1827. The generic name combines the Ancient Greek kampulos meaning "curved" or "bent" and -pteros meaning "-winged". The specific epithet largipennis combines the Latin largus meaning "ample" and -pennis meaning "-winged".

The further taxonomy of the grey-breasted sabrewing is unsettled. The International Ornithological Committee (IOC) assigns three subspecies, the nominate C. l. largipennis (Boddaert, 1783); C. l. obscurus Gould, 1848; and C. l. aequatorialis Gould, 1861. The Clements taxonomy and BirdLife International's Handbook of the Birds of the World (HBW) recognize only two by including aequatorialis within obscurus. In addition, C. l. obscurus has been suggested as a separate species.

What are now the outcrop sabrewing (C. calcirupicola) and Diamantina sabrewing (C. diamantinensis) were formerly treated as subspecies of the grey-breasted.

== Description ==
The grey-breasted sabrewing is a large hummingbird, 12.4 to 14.9 cm (4.9 to 5.9 in) long. Males weigh 9 to 10 g (0.32 to 0.35 oz) and females about 7 to 8 g (0.25 to 0.28 oz). The sexes have almost identical plumage. Their bill is slightly decurved; the maxilla is black and the mandible pinkish with a black tip. The nominate subspecies' upperparts are dark shining green and the underparts dark gray. They have a white spot behind the eye. Their central pair of tail feathers is green and the rest bluish black on their inner half and white on the outer. Subspecies C. l. obscurus (with C. l. aequatorialis) is smaller than the nominate and its outer tail feathers' ends are usually gray rather than white.

== Distribution and habitat ==
The three subspecies of grey-breasted sabrewing recognized by the IOC are distributed thus:

- C. l. largipennis, eastern Venezuela, the Guianas, and northern Brazil as far west as the Rio Negro
- C. l. obscurus, northeastern Brazil
- C. l. aequatorialis, from eastern Colombia and northwestern Brazil south through eastern Ecuador and Peru into northern Bolivia

The species inhabits humid primary and secondary forest, clearings within them, and plantations. In elevation it ranges between 100 and 800 m (330 and 2,600 ft).

== Behavior ==
=== Movement ===
The grey-breasted sabrewing is a year-round resident throughout its range.

=== Feeding ===
The grey-breasted sabrewing forages for nectar at a variety of flowering plants, usually at low to medium heights. Males defend feeding territories. In addition to nectar, the species captures small insects by hawking from a perch.

=== Breeding ===
The grey-breasted sabrewing's breeding seasons differ greatly among the parts of its large range. It makes a cup nest of moss lined with soft seed material and decorates the outside with lichen. It places it like a saddle on a horizontal branch or attaches it to hanging twigs, typically near waterfalls or running streams and within about 1 m (3 ft) of the ground. The incubation period and time to fledging are not known.

=== Vocalization ===
The grey-breasted sabrewing makes "repeated short chik or trzik" calls and "occasionally a faster stuttering series." What is thought to be its song is the "same call note delivered in a more regular continuous series."

== Status ==
The IUCN has assessed the grey-breasted sabrewing as being of Least Concern. It has a very large range and an estimated population of at least three million mature individuals, though the latter is believed to be decreasing. Its habitat is slowly being converted to agriculture, urbanization, and mining.
