= Cueva del Guácharo National Park =

National park in Venezuela

- IUCN category II (national park)
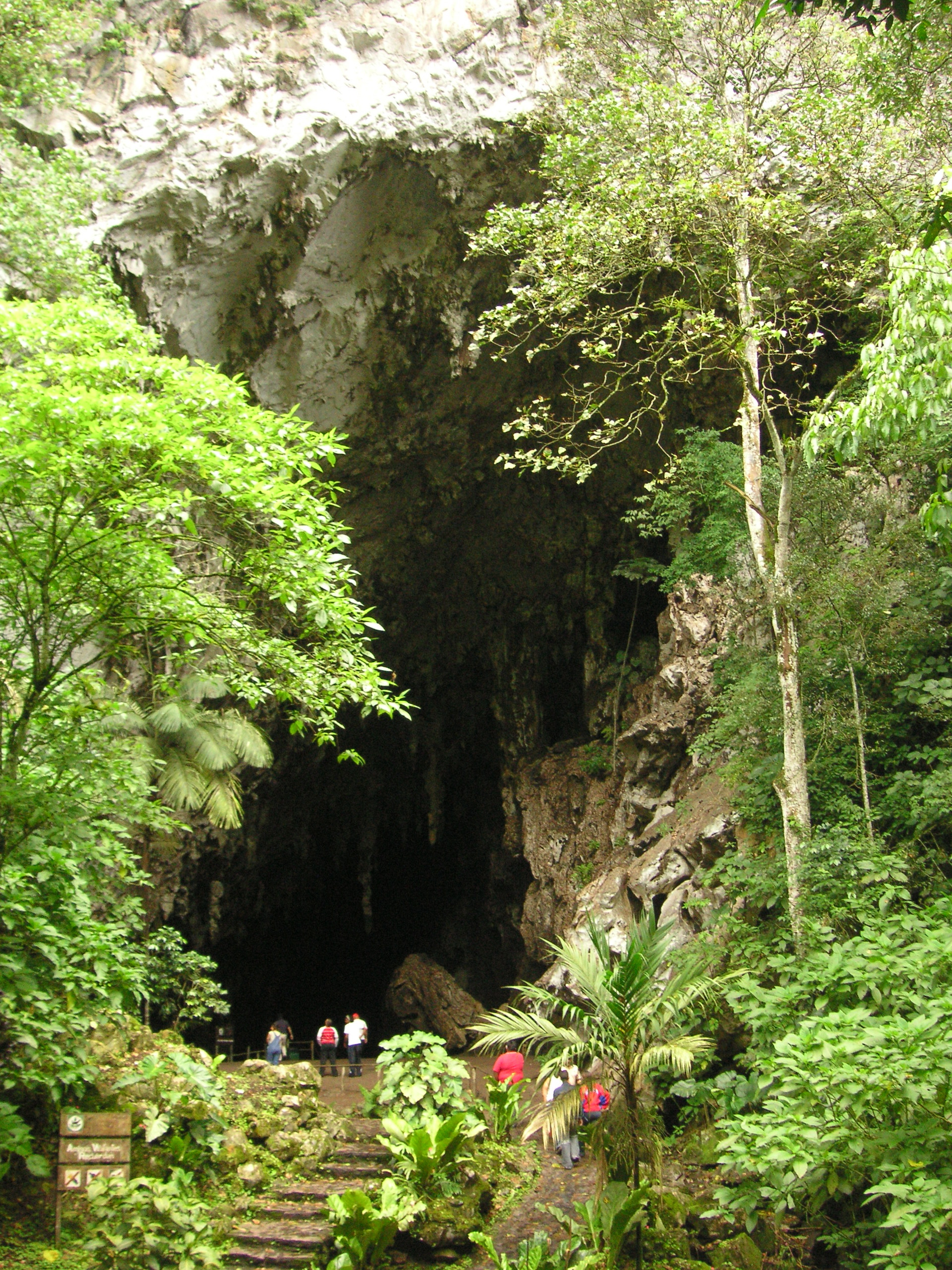
- Cave mouth

- Location within Venezuela
- Location: Monagas, Venezuela
- Nearest city: Caripe
- Coordinates: 10.19989°N 63.63968°W
- Area: 627 km^{2} (242 sq mi)
- Established: May 27, 1975
- Governing body: INPARQUES

The Guácharo Cave National Park (Spanish: Parque Nacional Cueva del Guácharo) is located 12 km (7.5 mi) from the town of Caripe, Monagas, Venezuela.

It has as its centerpiece a large limestone cave, Guácharo Cave, which is the longest cave in Venezuela. The cave is a limestone cavern over 10 km (6.2 mi) long, with a number of large chambers and rock formations. The temperature inside the cave generally remains near 19 °C (66 °F) and the humidity at 100%.

The cavern is famous for being home to thousands of guácharos, or oilbirds, which is where the cave and the park get their name.

== History ==
The cave was a sacred location for the Chaima, one of the indigenous groups of Venezuela living in the area surrounding Caripe. Magicians (piaches) and poisoners (imorons) would use the cave to summon Ivorokiamo, the supreme evil spirit of the Chaima.

This cave, home of nocturnal birds, is for the Indian a mystical place; they believe that the souls of their ancestors live in its depths. Man — they say — should fear these places not illumined by the sun (zis) or moon (nuna). To join the guácharos is synonymous with joining your ancestors, that is, to die.

— Alexander von Humboldt, Personal Narrative of a Journey to the Equinoctial Regions of the New Continent

Only the first section of the cave, Cerro de la Cueva, would be entered, since the first section is where oilbirds nest. The oilbirds were hunted in an annual oil harvest, and enough fat was collected from the birds to last throughout the year. Later, when the Capuchin monks established a convent in Caripe and missions in the surrounding areas, they used the oilbird fat harvested from the cave in order to cook their meals.

In 1799, scientist Alexander von Humboldt visited the cave during his scientific expedition in the Americas. His accounts of the visit as well as the various data he collected there form the first comprehensive scientific study of the cave. Humboldt was the first person to formally describe oilbirds as a species, naming it Steatornis caripensis, which means "fatbird of Caripe".

In 1949, Guácharo Cave was designated as Venezuela's first national monument. The cavern and the surrounding cloud forest were designated as a national park in 1975.

== Fauna ==
=== Guácharo ===
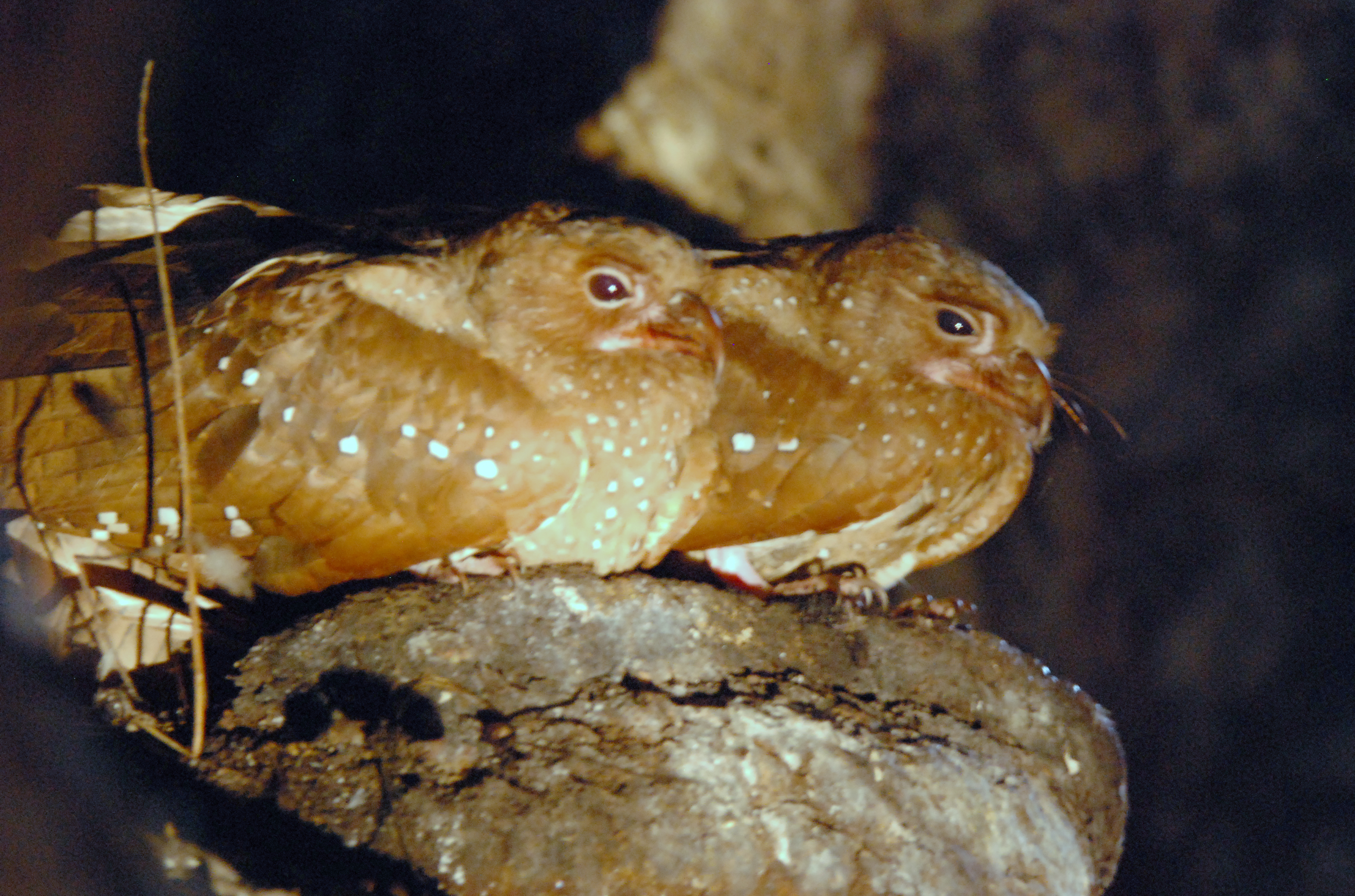
Oilbirds

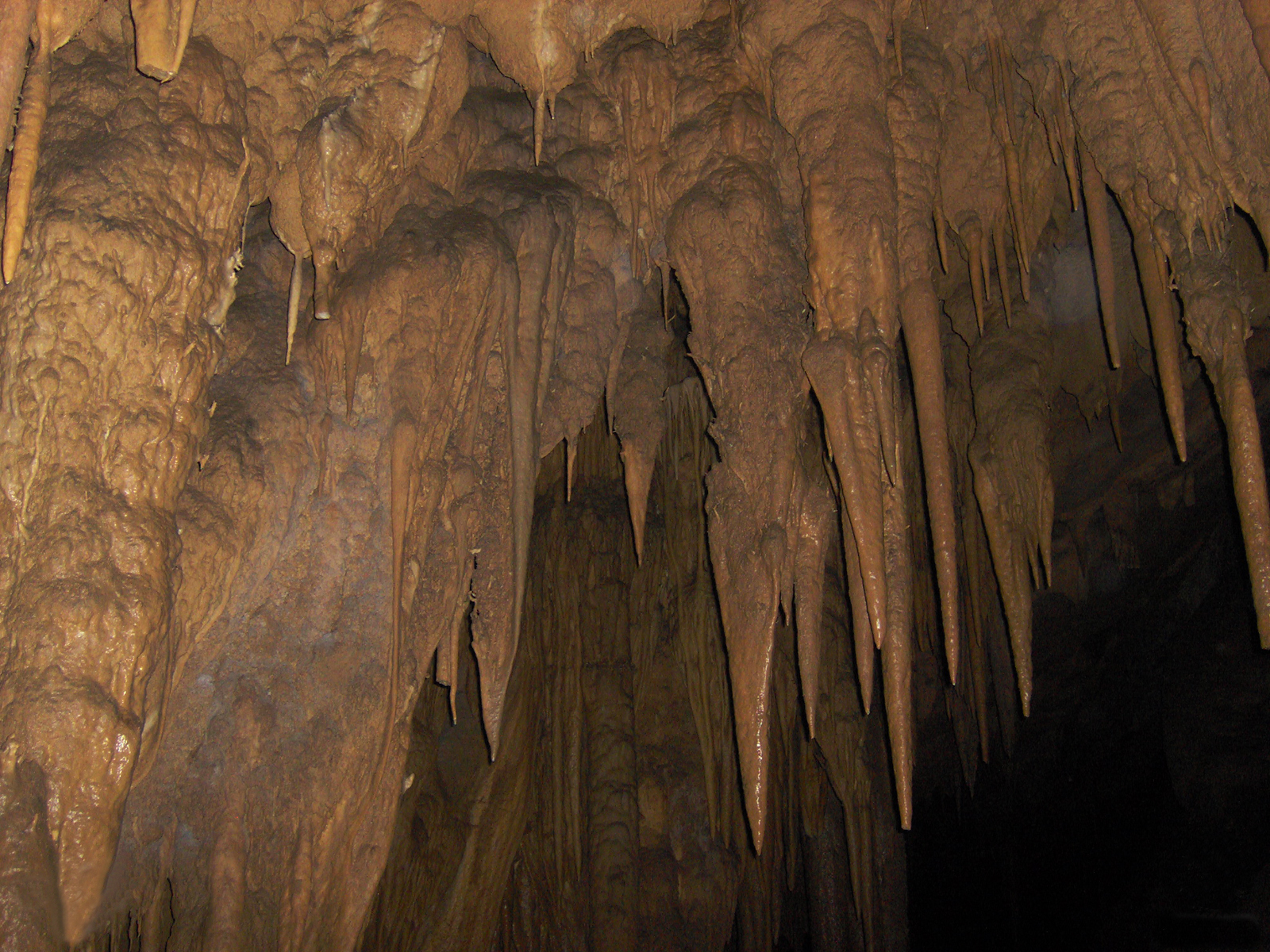
The cave inside

Oilbirds are fruit-eating birds that live within the first section of the cave; they leave at night in search of food. The Spanish name guácharo is onomatopoeic and comes from an old Castilian word for one who shrieks or cries, because of their characteristic sound. They are brown with black and white spots, have a long tail and bristles around their beak. They measure around 48 cm (19 in) in length, including the tail. The guácharos produce an organic layer in the cave called guano, formed by excrement and vomited seeds, which provide the basic nutrients for the cave's ecosystem.

The most important daily event in the park occurs in the evening, as dusk falls, when the birds exit the cave in great flocks, in search of food. Visitors are able to view the birds leaving the cave.

=== Other birds ===
There are 367 species of bird in the national park, which has been designated an Important Bird Area (IBA). Although the oilbird is not an endangered species, several other resident birds fall into this category, including the Venezuelan flowerpiercer and the Venezuelan sylph. The national park is part of the Cordillera de Caripe Alliance for Zero Extinction (AZE) site, along with another IBA, the Zona Protectora Macizo Montañoso del Turimiquire.

Other species of birds found in the park include the Andean cock-of-the-rock, white-tailed trogon, military macaw, swallow-tailed kite, chestnut-fronted macaw, Amazonian motmot, ornate hawk-eagle, scarlet-fronted parakeet, and black-and-white hawk-eagle.

=== Other fauna ===
The park is home to a diverse array of animals, including ocelots, pacas, collared peccaries, giant anteaters, and eyelash vipers. Red howler monkeys are often heard in the trees, and elusive species such as the bush dog and the giant armadillo are found in the park's forests, as well as the spectacled bear, which is South America's only species of bear. The critically endangered Orinoco crocodile, one of the most endangered species of crocodile in the world, lives in the rivers of the park.
