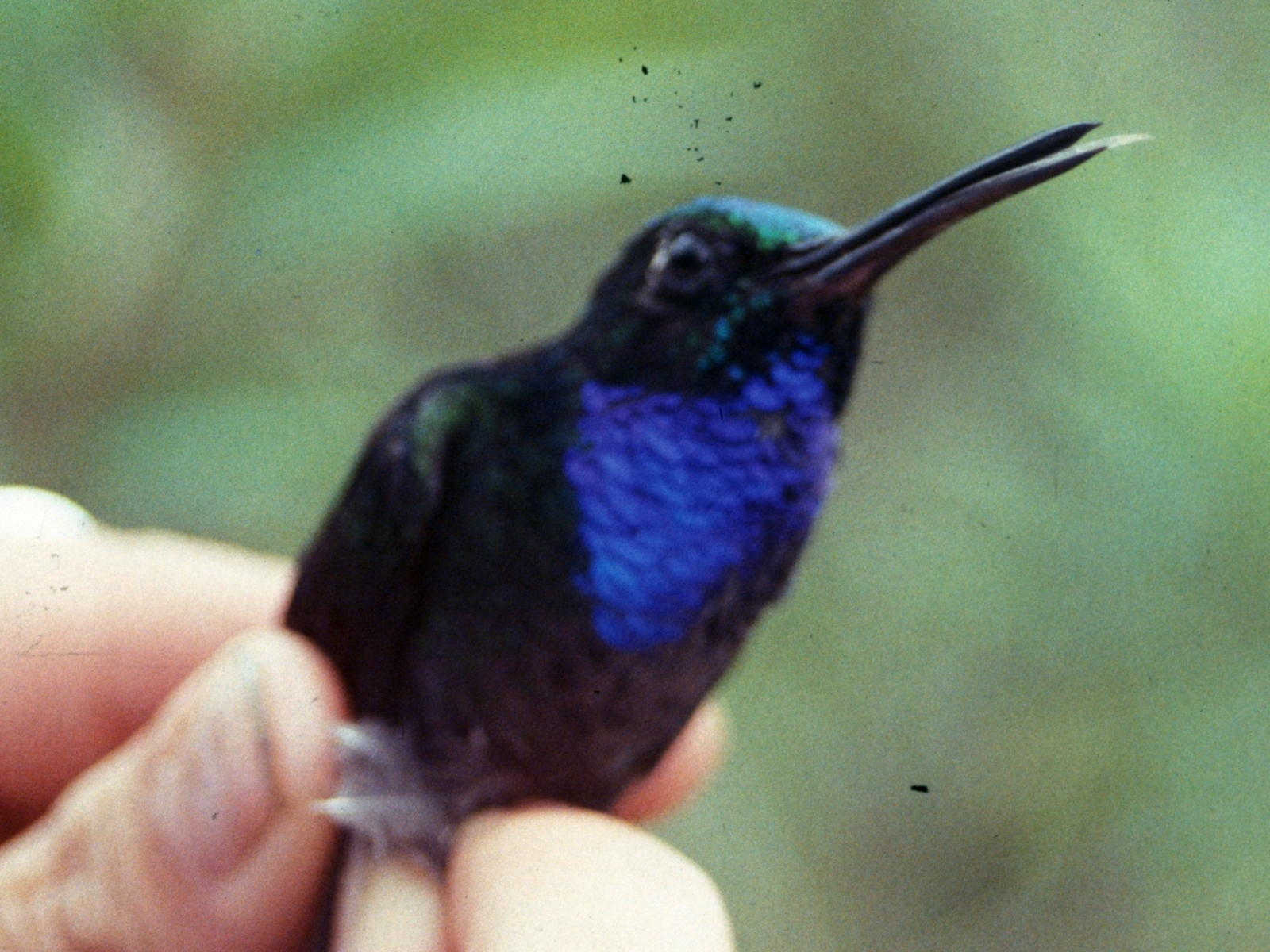

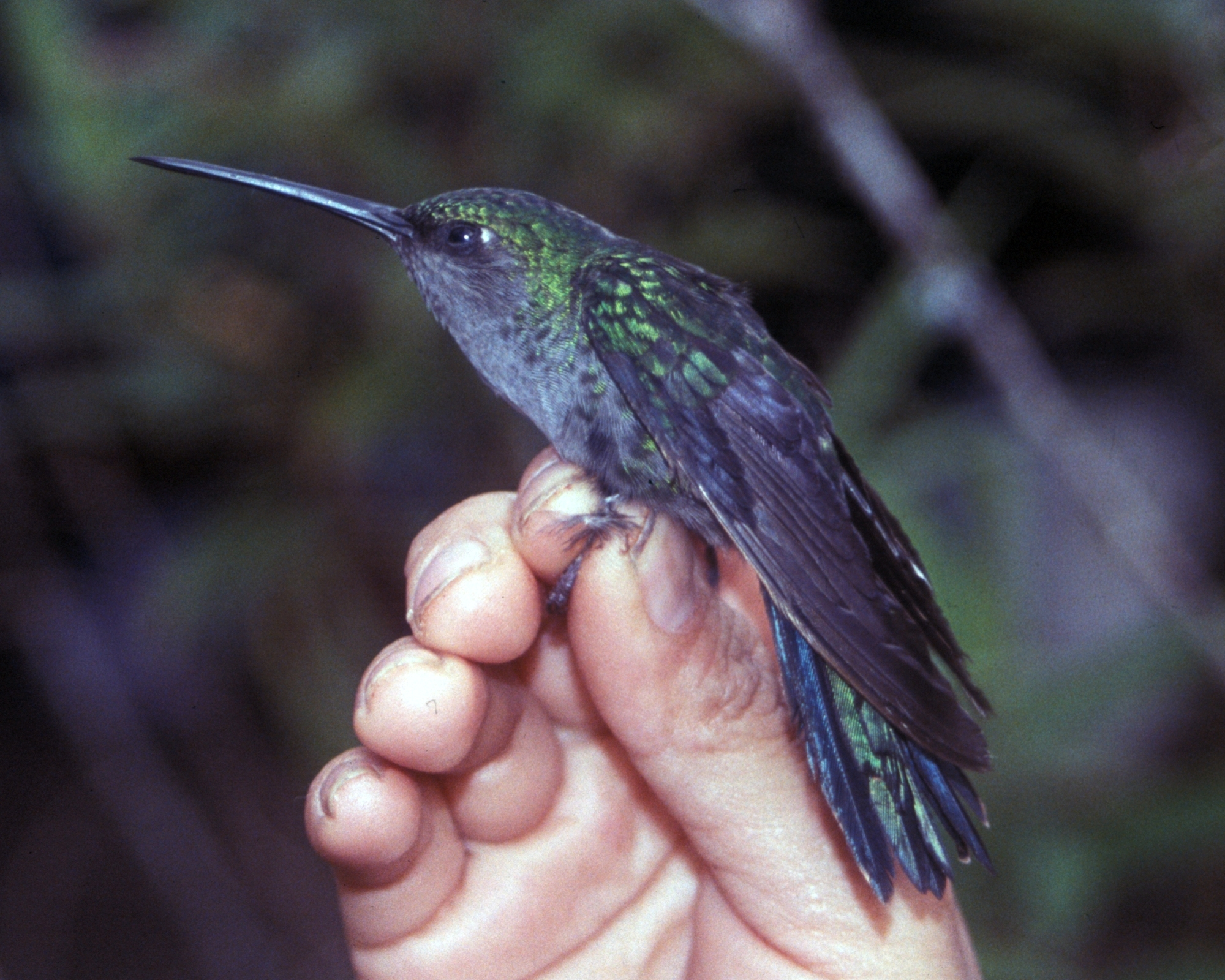
- male (above) and female (below)

Conservation status
- Near Threatened (IUCN 3.1)
- CITES Appendix II (CITES)

Scientific classification
- Kingdom: Animalia
- Phylum: Chordata
- Class: Aves
- Clade: Strisores
- Order: Apodiformes
- Family: Trochilidae
- Genus: Campylopterus
- Species: C. villaviscensio

Binomial name
- Campylopterus villaviscensio (Bourcier, 1851)

= Napo sabrewing =

Species of hummingbird

The Napo sabrewing (Campylopterus villaviscensio) is a Near Threatened species of hummingbird in the "emeralds", tribe Trochilini of subfamily Trochilinae. It is found in Colombia, Ecuador, and Peru.

== Taxonomy and systematics ==
The Napo sabrewing is monotypic.

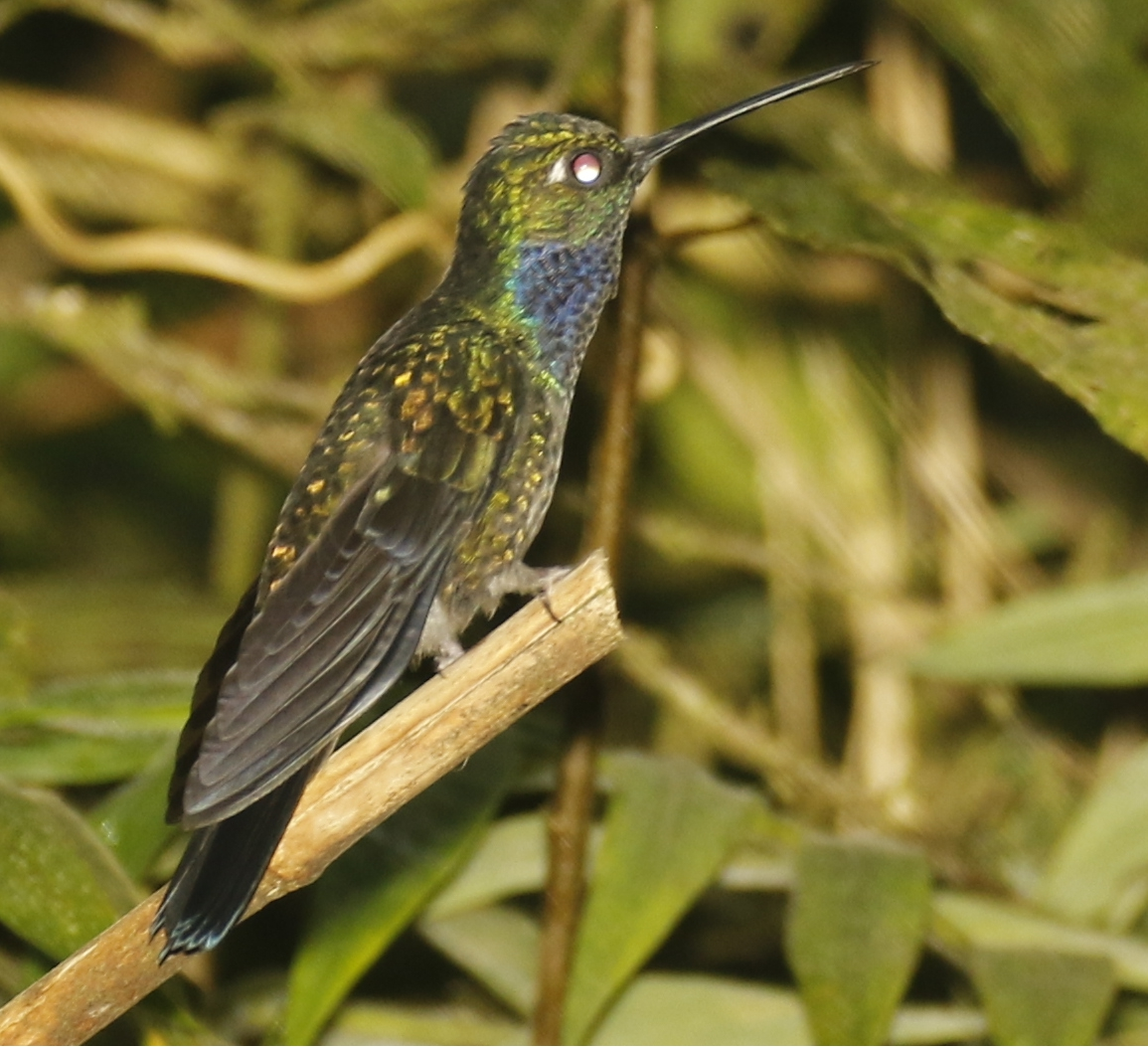
Wildsumaco Lodge - Ecuador (flash photo)

== Description ==
The Napo sabrewing is about 13.5 cm (5.3 in) long. Males weigh 7.4 to 9.3 g (0.26 to 0.33 oz) and females 5.2 to 7.4 g (0.18 to 0.26 oz). Both sexes have an almost straight black bill and a white spot behind the eye. The male's crown is glittering golden green and the rest of its upperparts bronzy green. Its throat and chest are dark violet-blue and the rest of its underparts dark gray with green spots. Its central tail feathers are bronze-green and the rest dark blue. Females have entirely emerald green upperparts and gray underparts. Their tail is blue-green with whitish gray tips to the feathers.

== Distribution and habitat ==
The Napo sabrewing is found from southern Colombia through eastern Ecuador into northeastern Peru as far as San Martín Department. It inhabits humid montane forest, elfin forest, and secondary forest. In elevation it mostly ranges between 1,000 and 1,800 m (3,300 and 5,900 ft) but occurs as low as 780 m (2,600 ft) in southern Colombia.

== Behavior ==
=== Movement ===
The Napo sabrewing's movements, if any, are not known.

=== Feeding ===
The Napo sabrewing forages for nectar from the understory to the mid-strata of the forest. In addition to nectar it feeds on small insects by hawking from a perch. No details of its diet are known.

=== Breeding ===
Napo sabrewings have been noted in breeding condition in October and November, but nothing else is known about the species' breeding phenology.

=== Vocalization ===
The Napo sabrewing's song is "a long series of two notes repeated continuously at evenly spaced intervals 'tslip...tseek...tslip...tseek...' or 'trrip...tseek...trrip...tseek'." Its calls include "a single 'chip' or doubled 'chirrip'" that sometimes become a short rattle.

== Status ==
The IUCN has assessed the Napo sabrewing as Near Threatened. It has a "moderately small" range and its unknown population number is believed to be decreasing. The principal threats are mining, logging, and conversion of its forest habitat to agriculture and pasture.
