= Aragua de Maturín =

- Town
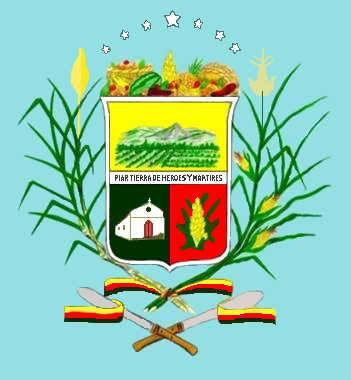
- Coat of arms

- Location within Venezuela
- Coordinates: 9°58′N 63°29′W
- Country: Venezuela
- State: Monagas State
- Municipality: Piar

Aragua de Maturín is a town in Venezuela's Monagas State. It is the municipal seat of Piar Municipality.

== Economy ==
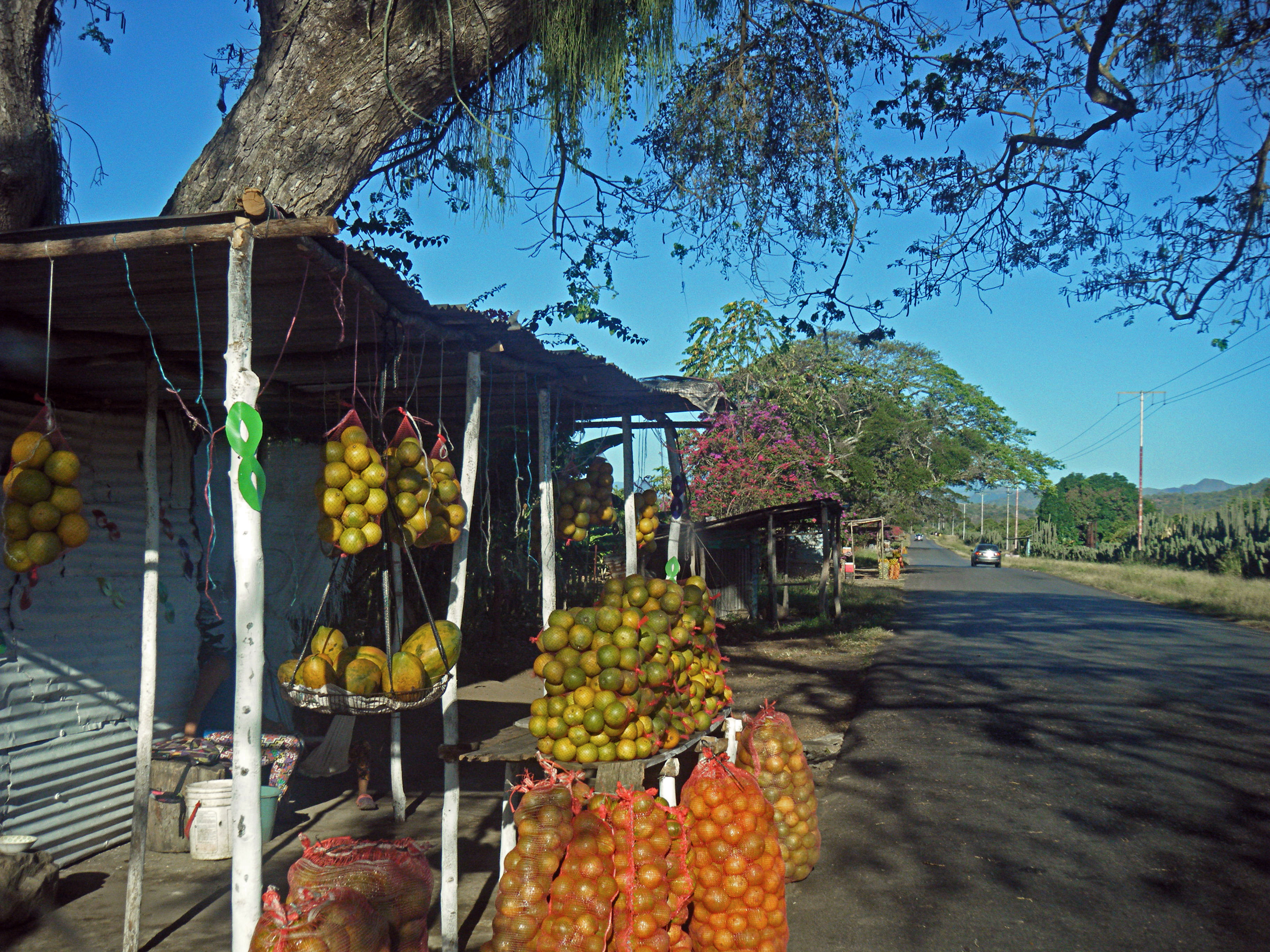
Sales of oranges in Aragua.

The economy in Aragua de Maturin is based in the agriculture.

According to Encyclopædia Britannica, corn, coffee, peanuts and sorghum are agricultural products that contribute to the economy of this capital region of the state of Monagas. In the 1980s the discovery of the Furrial Oil Fields boosted both the economy and the population.

The city of Maturin is located between the eastern edge of the Andean Highlands and the delta of the Orinoco River. Named after a native chieftain who led an uprising against the Conquistadors in 1718, the city, which now has an international airport, was founded by Capuchin monks in 1760.

Some historic information about this area can be found in William Jackson Adam's account of his travels in 1819 and 1820. His book, Voyages to Marguaritta, Trinidad and Maturin with the authors travels across the plains of Llaneros to Angustura and subsequent descent of the Orinoco in the years 1819 to 1820 is in the Harvard University Archives.
