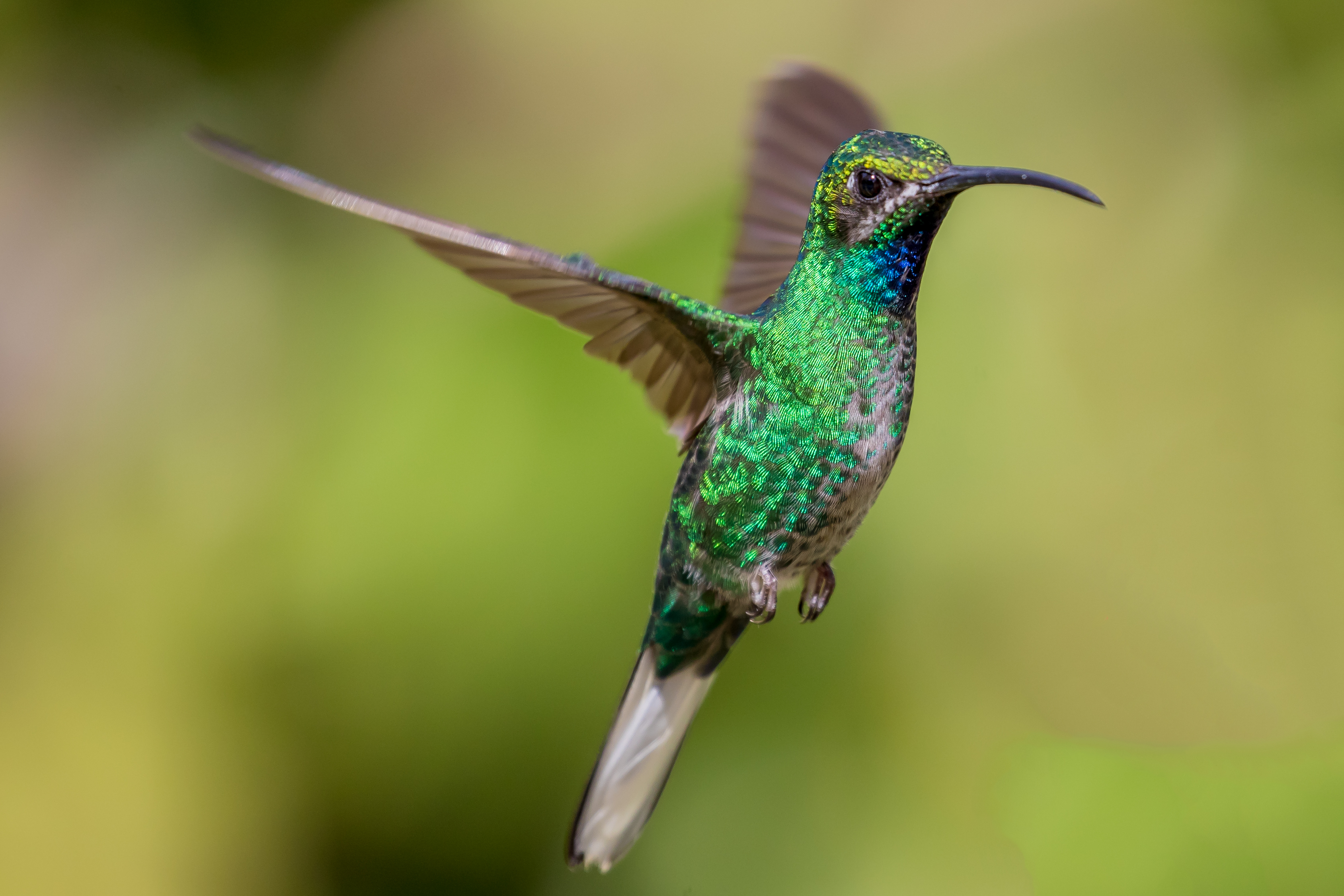
- White-tailed sabrewing Campylopterus ensipennis

Scientific classification
- Kingdom: Animalia
- Phylum: Chordata
- Class: Aves
- Order: Apodiformes
- Family: Trochilidae
- Tribe: Trochilini
- Genus: Campylopterus; Swainson, 1827

Type species
- Trochilus latipennis Latham, 1790=Trochilus largipennis Boddaert, 1783

Species
- 10, see text

= Sabrewing =

Genus of birds

Sabrewing is the common name given to hummingbirds classified in the genus Campylopterus. The group includes ten species. They are Neotropical birds that inhabit mountainous forests, generally near streams.

Sabrewings are on average 12 to 15 cm long. Although small birds, they are relatively large compared to other hummingbirds. The bill is black, strong and slightly curved. The two outer primary remiges (flight feathers) are thick and curved, giving the wings a generally curved appearance. This characteristic is the origin of the common name "sabrewing" and the generic name Campylopterus, from the Greek kampulos (curved) + pteros (wing).

The plumage of sabrewings is based on brownish-green, cinnamon, gray and combinations. Some species have additional shades of violet, particularly on the head, tail and/or throat.

Sabrewings feed on flower nectar, like most hummingbirds, with a preference for flowers of the genus Heliconia.

== Taxonomy ==
The genus Campylopterus was erected by the English naturalist William Swainson in 1827 who listed two species in the genus but did not specify the type. In 1840 the English zoologist George Gray designated the type as Trochilus latipennis Latham, 1790. This is a junior synonym of Trochilus largipennis Boddaert, 1783, the grey-breasted sabrewing. The generic name combines the Ancient Greek kampulos meaning "curved" or "bent" and -pteros meaning "-winged".

The genus contains 10 species:

Image	Name	Common name	Distribution
	Campylopterus largipennis	Gray-breasted sabrewing	Amazon rainforest
	Campylopterus diamantinensis	Diamantina sabrewing	Brazil
	Campylopterus calcirupicola	Outcrop sabrewing	Brazil
	Campylopterus hyperythrus	Rufous-breasted sabrewing	Brazil, Guyana, and Venezuela
	Campylopterus ensipennis	White-tailed sabrewing	northeastern Venezuela and Tobago
	Campylopterus falcatus	Lazuline sabrewing	Colombia, Ecuador, and Venezuela
	Campylopterus phainopeplus	Santa Marta sabrewing	Colombia
	Campylopterus hemileucurus	Violet sabrewing	southern Mexico and Central America as far south as Costa Rica and western Panama
	Campylopterus duidae	Buff-breasted sabrewing	Brazil and Venezuela
	Campylopterus villaviscensio	Napo sabrewing	Colombia, Ecuador, and Peru
