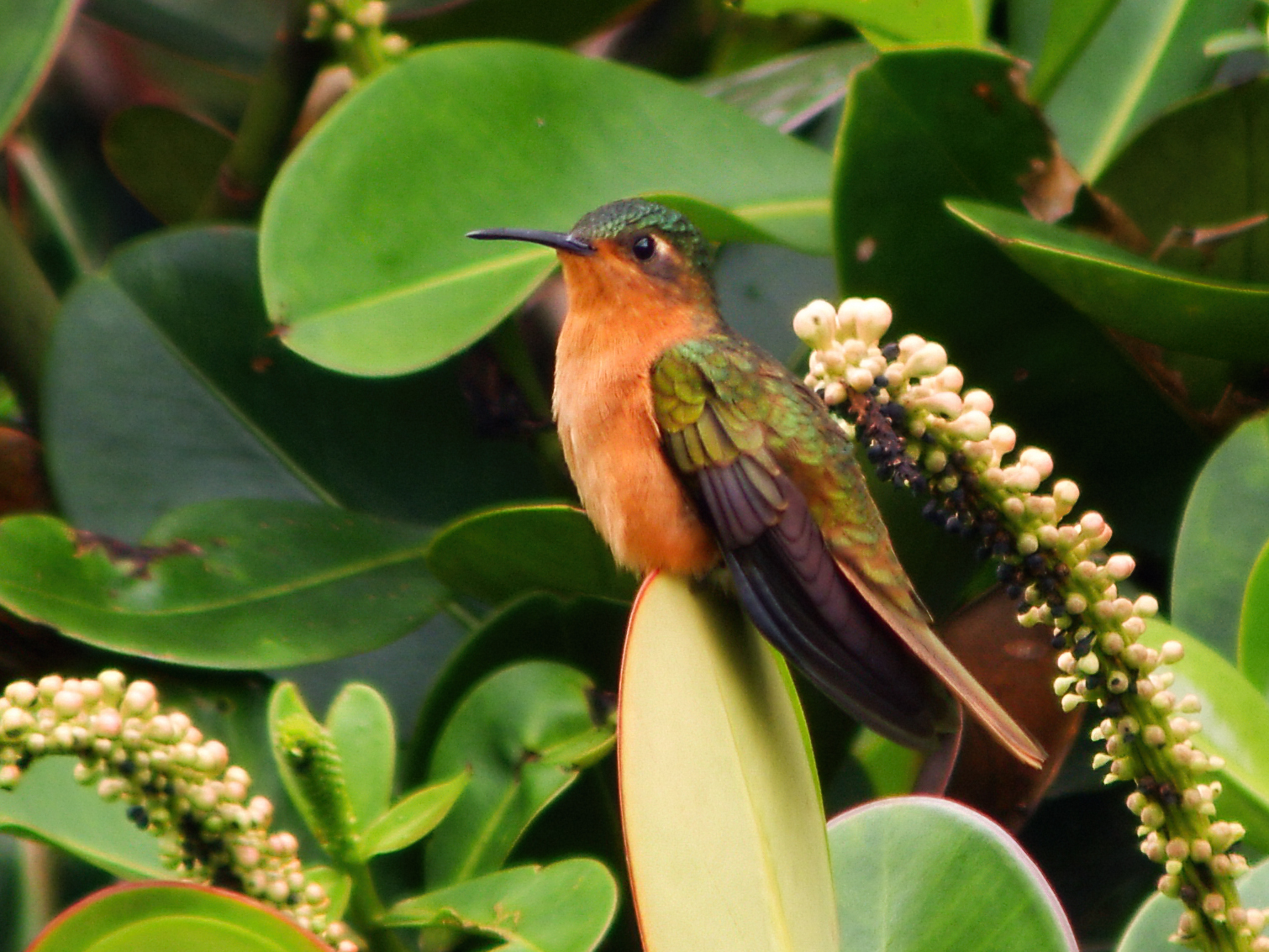

Conservation status
- Least Concern (IUCN 3.1)
- CITES Appendix II

Scientific classification
- Kingdom: Animalia
- Phylum: Chordata
- Class: Aves
- Order: Apodiformes
- Family: Trochilidae
- Genus: Campylopterus
- Species: C. hyperythrus

Binomial name
- Campylopterus hyperythrus Cabanis, 1849

= Rufous-breasted sabrewing =

Species of hummingbird

The rufous-breasted sabrewing (Campylopterus hyperythrus) is a species of hummingbird in the "emeralds", tribe Trochilini of subfamily Trochilinae. It is found in Brazil, Guyana, and Venezuela.

== Taxonomy and systematics ==
The rufous-breasted sabrewing is monotypic. However, at one time some authors treated what is now the buff-breasted sabrewing (C. duidae) as a subspecies. The two are closely related and may be sister species.

== Description ==
The rufous-breasted sabrewing is 10.4 to 12 cm (4.1 to 4.7 in) long. Males weigh about 6.8 g (0.24 oz) and females 5.4 g (0.19 oz). Males and females are almost identical. They have a rather thick bill that is mostly black with a pinkish or light brown base to the mandible. Their face is cinnamon rufous with a dusky "mask" and a white spot behind the eye. Their upperparts are shining coppery green to bronzy green. Their underparts are cinnamon rufous. The central two pairs of tail feathers are reddish to golden bronze and the outer three pairs cinnamon rufous.

== Distribution and habitat ==
The rufous-breasted sabrewing is found on the isolated table mountains called tepuis where northwestern Brazil, western Guyana, and eastern Venezuela meet. It inhabits humid montane forest, especially its edges, disturbed areas, and adjacent scrubby areas. In elevation it ranges between 1,000 and 2,000 m (3,300 and 6,600 ft).

== Behavior ==
=== Movement ===
The rufous-breasted sabrewing is considered to be a year-round resident, but because its abundance fluctuates it is suspected to make seasonal movements.

=== Feeding ===
The rufous-breasted sabrewing's foraging strategy and diet are known only sketchily. It does forage for nectar at all levels of the habitat. At times it defends feeding territories, but up to 20 have been seen feeding in a single flowering tree. It is assumed to also feed on small arthropods like nearly all other hummingbirds.

=== Breeding ===
Almost nothing is known about the rufous-breasted sabrewing's breeding phenology. It makes a cup nest, and reportedly places it 2 to 3 m (7 to 10 ft) above the ground, but no details have been described.

=== Vocalization ===
The rufous-breasted sabrewing's song may be as simple as "a series of chip notes." While foraging it makes "a weak, nasal sqeeek with [a] strained quality."

== Status ==
The IUCN has assessed the rufous-breasted sabrewing as being of Least Concern. It has a restricted range and its population size is not known, though the latter is believed to be stable. Habitat changes due to a warming climate are believed to be the only significant threat. It is considered to be fairly common.
