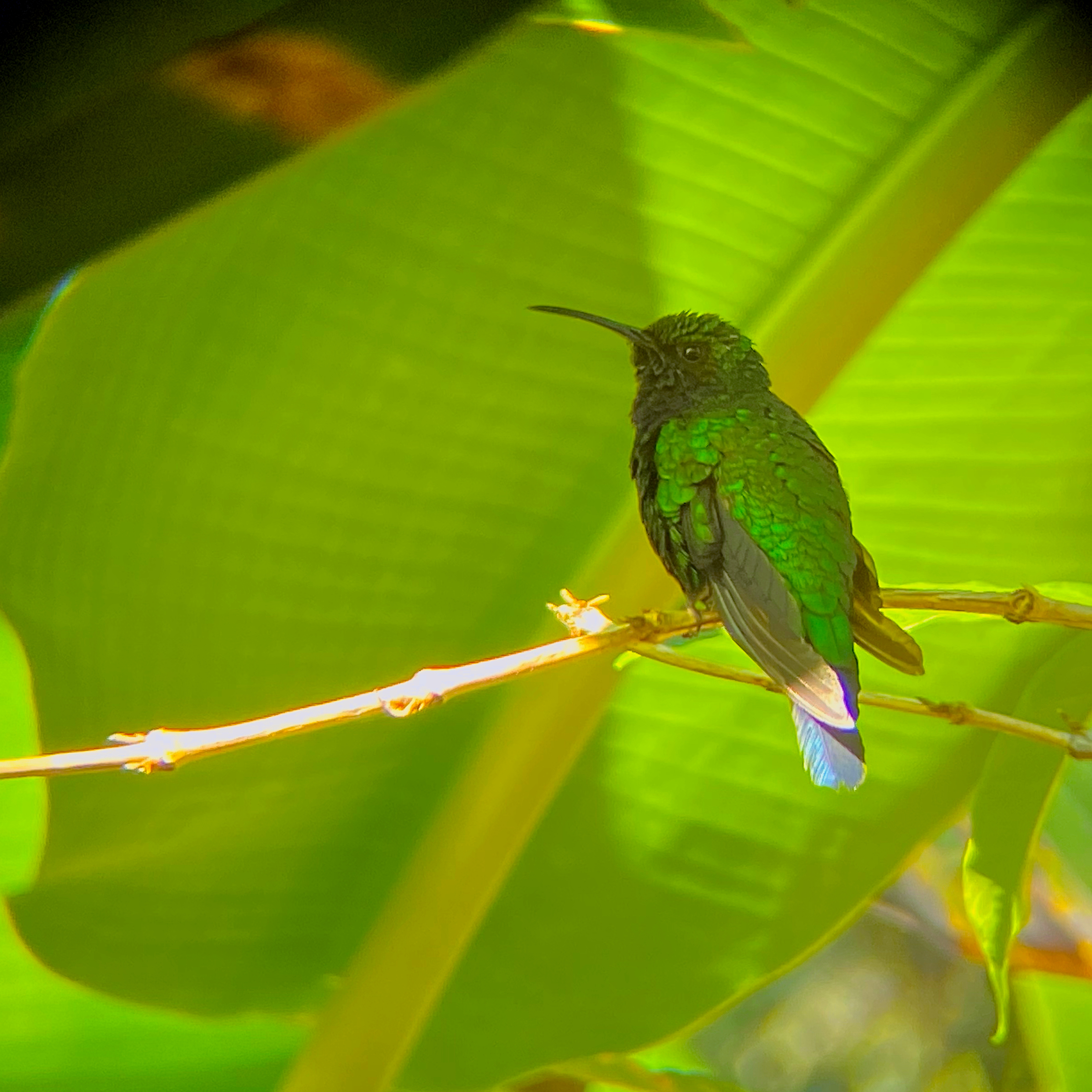
- A male, from the rediscovery site January 2023 (Andrés M. Cuervo)

Conservation status
- Critically Endangered (IUCN 3.1)
- CITES Appendix II

Scientific classification
- Kingdom: Animalia
- Phylum: Chordata
- Class: Aves
- Order: Apodiformes
- Family: Trochilidae
- Genus: Campylopterus
- Species: C. phainopeplus

Binomial name
- Campylopterus phainopeplus Salvin & Godman, 1879

= Santa Marta sabrewing =

Species of hummingbird

The Santa Marta sabrewing (Campylopterus phainopeplus) is a Critically Endangered species of hummingbird in the "emeralds", tribe Trochilini of subfamily Trochilinae. It is endemic to the Guatapurí dry enclave on the eastern side of the Sierra Nevada de Santa Marta, department of Cesar, northern Colombia. It is one of 24 bird species that are endemic to the Santa Marta highlands.

== Taxonomy and systematics ==
Campylopterus phainopeplus has at times been placed in genus Saepiopterus. It is monotypic.

== Description ==
The Santa Marta sabrewing is about 13 cm (5.1 in) long. Both sexes have a decurved black bill, with the female's having more curvature, and both have a white spot behind the eye. Males' upperparts are glittering emerald green. They have a black face; their throat and breast are iridescent blue and the rest of their underparts dark green. Their tail is dark steely blue. The female has shining green upperparts and mostly grayish white underparts with green flanks and undertail coverts. Its tail is mostly green with grayish tips on the outermost pair of feathers.

== Distribution and habitat ==
The Santa Marta sabrewing is known only from the eastern slopes of the Sierra Nevada, in the highlands of the Guatapurí basin, west of Valledupar in northern Colombia. Because it is far from Santa Marta, and it is endemic to the most important basin in department of Cesar, a proposal to change its English standard name to Guatapurí sabrewing is being discussed. It inhabits the edges of humid forest, plantations (especially of bananas), and bushy páramo. In elevation it ranges from 1,200 to 2,400 m (3,900 to 7,900 ft).

== Behavior ==
=== Movement ===
The Santa Marta sabrewing spends the dry season of February to May below 1,800 m (5,900 ft) and moves higher, even as far as the snow line, during the June to October wet season. However, it is likely not as migratory as previously suspected.

=== Feeding ===
Almost nothing is known about the Santa Marta sabrewing's feeding strategy or diet. It has been documented feeding on flowering banana (Musa), Calliandra trees, Erythrina trees, and Malvaviscus flowers, specifically Malvaviscus concinnus. Is it also territorial.

=== Breeding ===
Santa Marta sabrewings in breeding condition have been found between April and June, and males have been seen displaying in June and July. Nothing else is known about the species' breeding phenology and its nest has not been described.

=== Vocalization ===
As of mid-2022 only one recording of the Santa Marta sabrewing is known. It makes "a plaintive double 'twit-twit', both in flight and display."

== Status ==
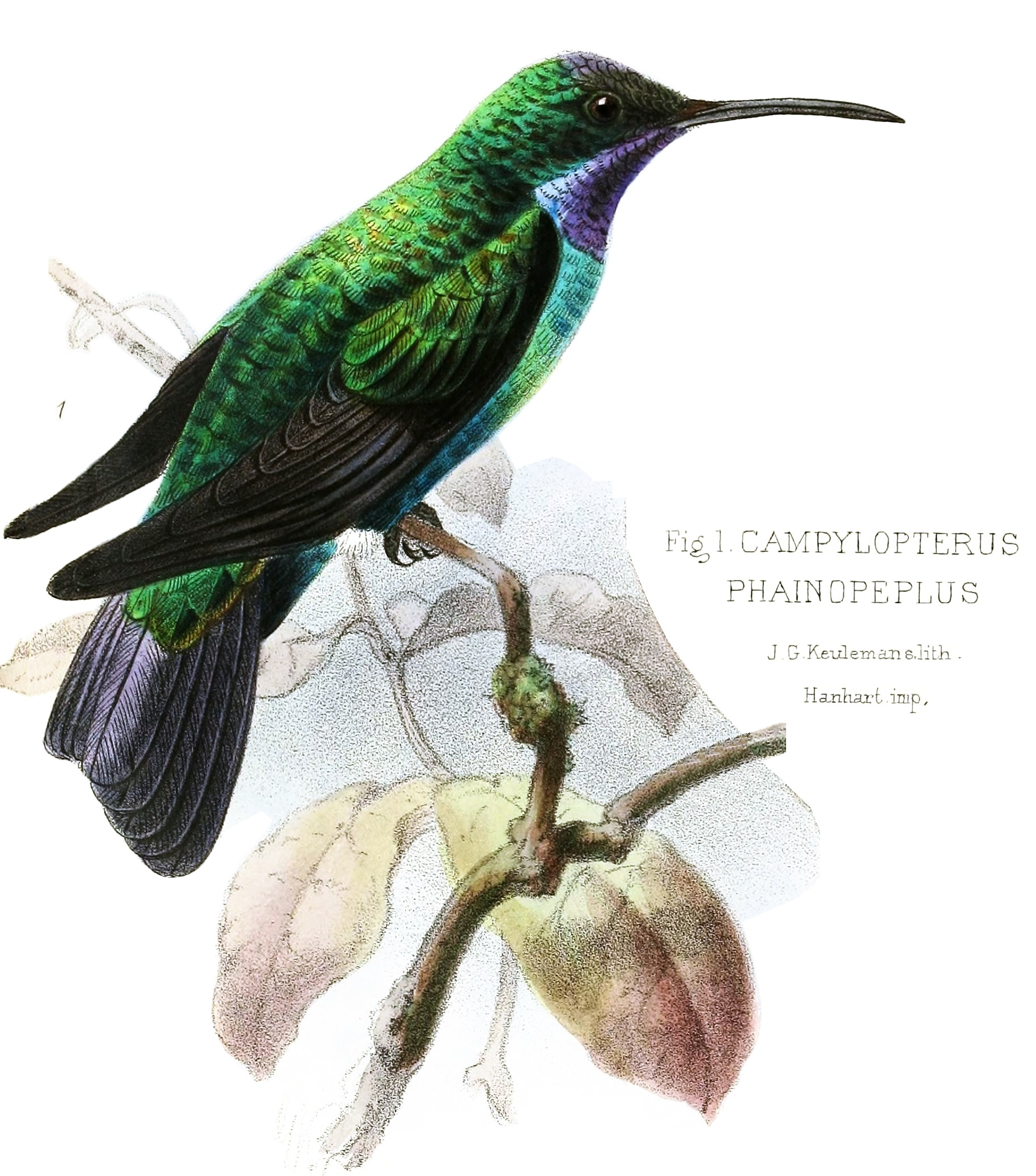
A male, illustrated by J. G. Keulemans.

The IUCN originally assessed the Santa Marta sabrewing as Near Threatened, then in 2000 as Endangered, and since 2020 as Critically Endangered. It has a very small range and is thought to number fewer than 50 mature individuals. About 85% of the original vegetation within its range has been destroyed by logging and conversion to agriculture, grazing, and human habitation. What remains is degraded and fragmented. Further losses are expected due to human activity and climate change. The latter is causing the dry season to expand which increases the risk of fire. Some details of habitat loss were published in 2016.

Until about 1900 the Santa Marta Sabrewing was described as fairly common, and it was recorded intermittently until 1946. It was not recorded again until 2010 and was then again "lost" until 2022, when its survival was confirmed by photographic evidence of an individual male, found by chance.
