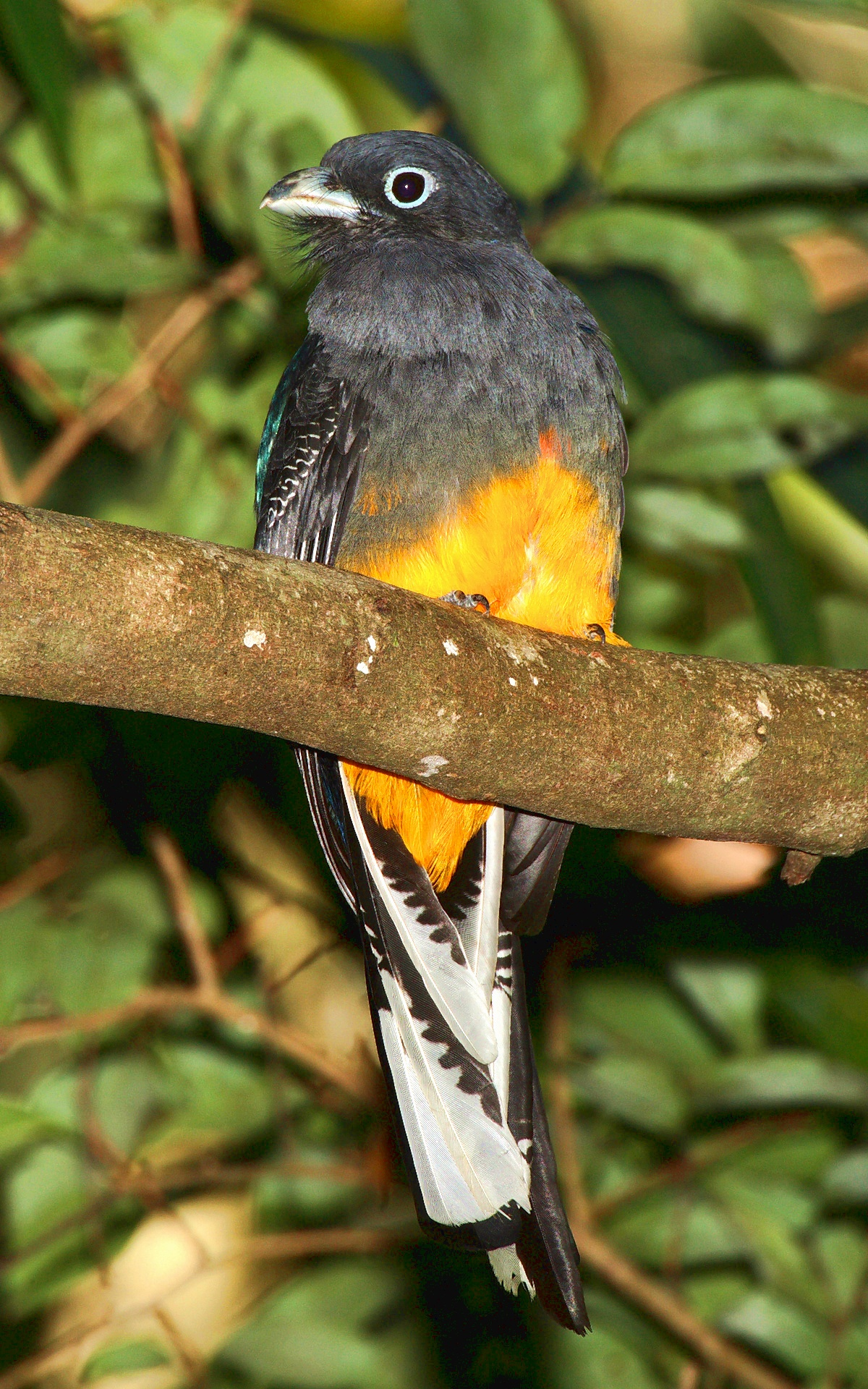
- Immature male

Conservation status
- Least Concern (IUCN 3.1)

Scientific classification
- Kingdom: Animalia
- Phylum: Chordata
- Class: Aves
- Order: Trogoniformes
- Family: Trogonidae
- Genus: Trogon
- Species: T. chionurus

Binomial name
- Trogon chionurus Sclater, PL & Salvin, 1871

Synonyms
- Trogon viridis chionurus

= White-tailed trogon =

Species of bird

The white-tailed trogon (Trogon chionurus) is a species of bird in the trogon family. It is found in tropical humid forests of the Chocó, ranging from Panama, through western Colombia, to western Ecuador. It was formerly considered a subspecies of T. viridis, which is widespread in South America east of the Andes, but under the English name white-tailed trogon (a name now reserved for T. chionurus, leaving T. viridis as the green-backed trogon).

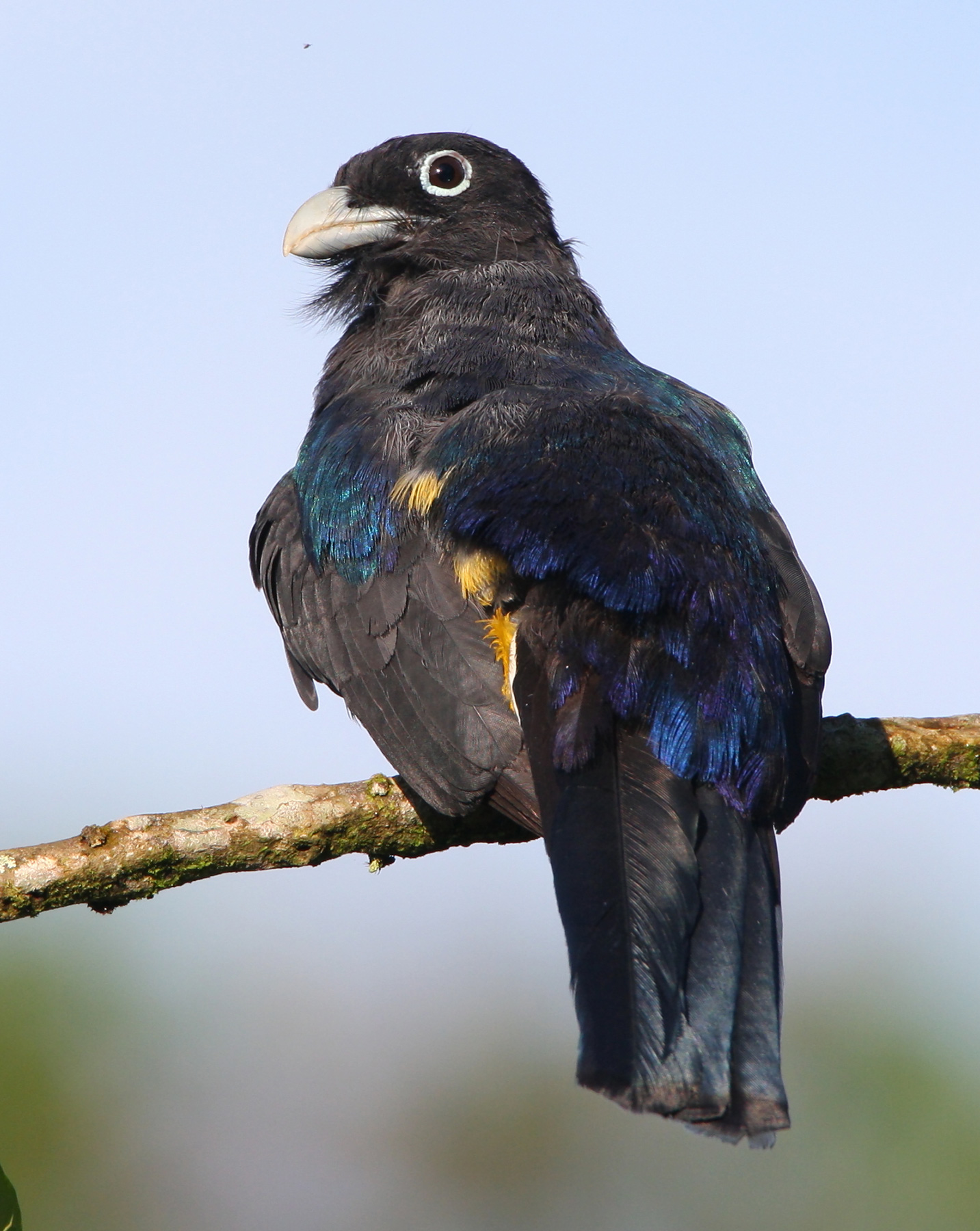
Male, Rio Silanche Reserve, NW Ecuador

== Description ==
This relatively large trogon is 28 to 30 centimetres (11 to 12 in) long. As most trogons, it is strongly sexually dimorphic. In the male the head and upper breast are dark blue (appears blackish in poor light), and the back is green, becoming bluer on the rump. The lower underparts are orange-yellow. The wings are black, vermiculated with white. The undertail is almost entirely white with only a very narrow black base to each feather. The complete eye-ring is pale bluish. The female white-tailed trogon resembles the male, but has a grey back, head and breast, and rather indistinct black-and-white barring mainly to the inner webs of each tail feather (less on outer webs).

For comparison, the similar but smaller gartered trogon (T. caligatus) has a yellow (male) or incomplete white eye-ring (female), and the male also has barring to the undertail.

There is no overlap in the distribution of the white-tailed and green-backed trogons, but the two can be separated by the undertail pattern: Unlike the white-tailed trogon, the male green-backed trogon has a broad black base to each feather, and the female has relatively distinct black-and-white barring mainly to the outer webs of each feather. The male white-tailed trogon also has a bluer rump than the green-backed trogon.

The song of the white-tailed trogon consists of 15-20 very fast cow notes.

== Ecology ==
They typically perch upright and motionless. Although their flight is fast, they are reluctant to fly any distance. Their broad bills and weak legs reflect their diet and arboreal habits. White-tailed trogons feed mainly on small fruit, supplemented by arthropods – slightly more so in the dry season when fruit is scarce.
