= Piar Municipality, Monagas =

Piar Municipality Municipio Piar
- Municipality
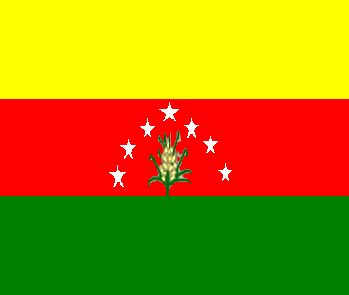
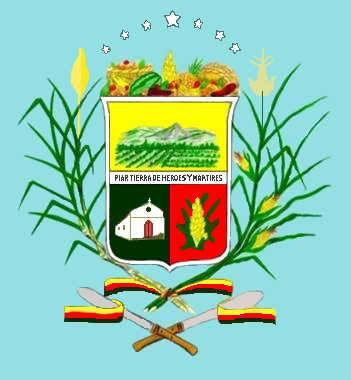
- Flag Coat of arms

- Location in Monagas

- Location in Venezuela
- Coordinates: 9°56′57″N 63°25′32″W
- Country: Venezuela
- State: Monagas
- Municipal seat: Aragua de Maturín

Government
  - Mayor: Mariangellys Tillero (PSUV)

Area
  - Total: 1,043.3 km^{2} (402.8 sq mi)
- Time zone: UTC−4 (VET)

Piar Municipality is a municipality in Monagas State, Venezuela. In the north it borders Caripe Municipality.

== History ==
On 2021, Mariangellys Tillero was elected Major.

== Climate ==
Minimum monthly temperature in the Piar municipality lies between 14.3 and 23.1 °C, while maximum temperature is between 23.9 and 33.3 °C. Total annual precipitation fluctuates between 1083 and 1898 mm. Most rain falls between June and August, while the driest quarter comprises February to April.

== Culture ==
=== Festivities ===
- Canavales La Maya (La Maya carvivals).

== Mayor ==
- Miguel Fuentes. (2008 - 2013), (2013 - 2017) PSUV.
- Mariangellys Tillero (2021 - 2025).
