= Caripe =

- Caripe del Guácharo
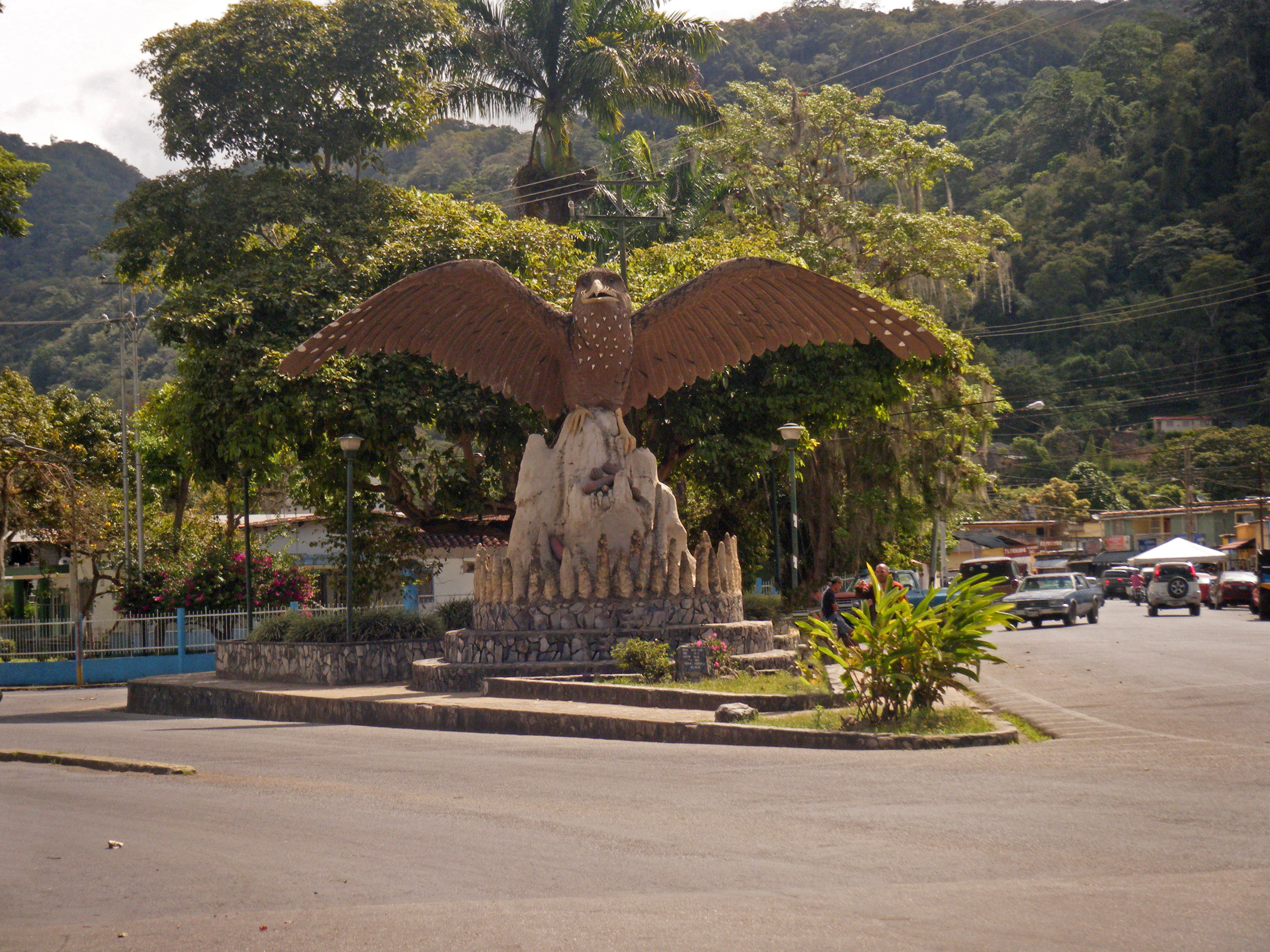
- Nickname: Jardín del Oriente Venezolano
- Location within Venezuela
- Coordinates: 10°10′09″N 63°30′36″W
- Country: Venezuela
- State: Monagas
- Municipality: Caripe Municipality
- Founded: 12 October 1734
- Elevation: 800 m (2,600 ft)
- Time zone: VST

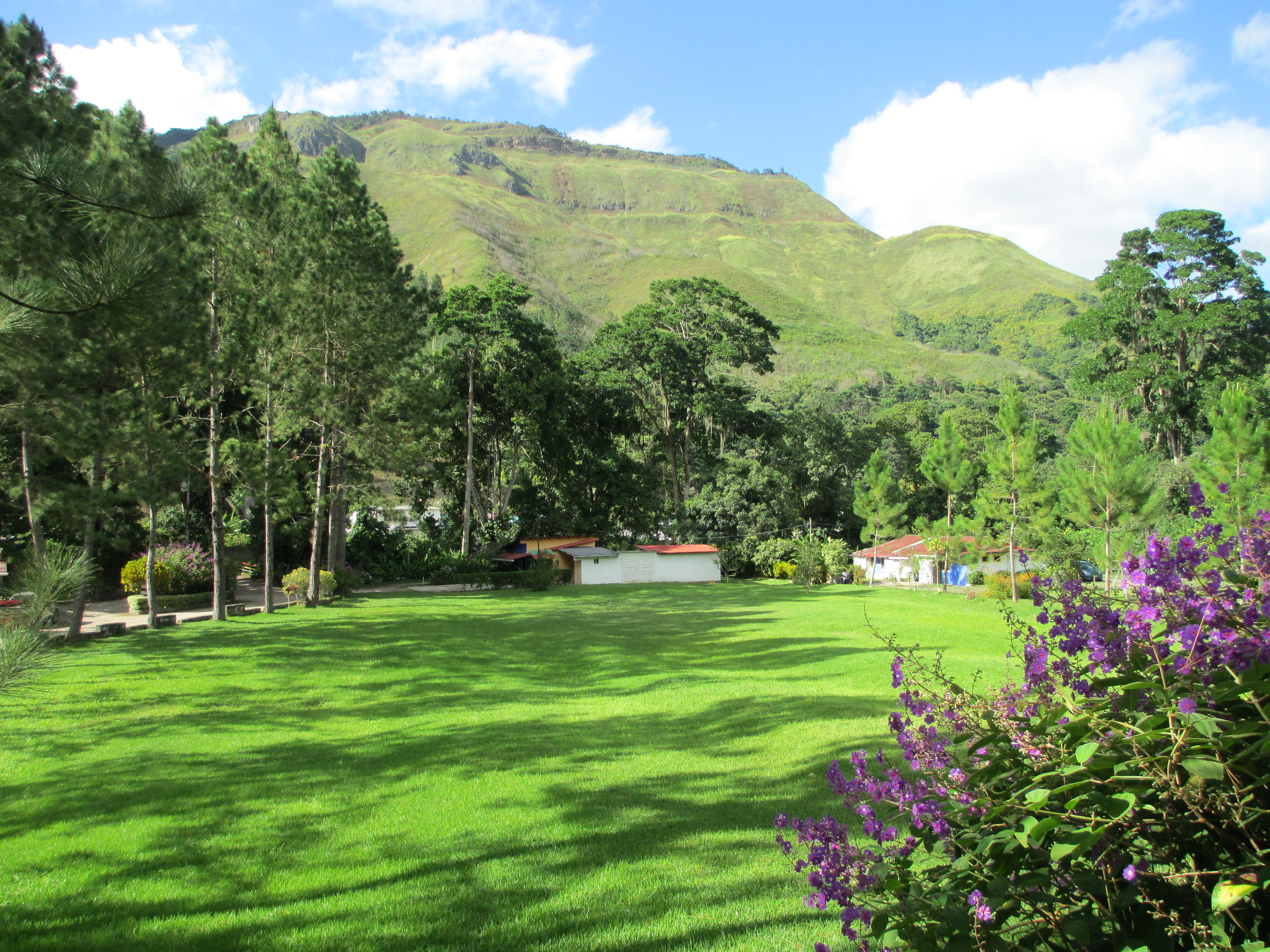
Mountains near Caripe

Caripe is a town in Caripe Municipality in the mountainous north of the state of Monagas in eastern Venezuela. The official name of the town is Caripe del Guácharo 'Caripe of the Oilbird', referring to a colony of nocturnal birds which lives in a nearby cave, the Cueva del Guácharo. The species was unknown to science until 1799 when Alexander von Humboldt came to Caripe during his Latin American Expedition.

At the time of Humboldt's visit Caripe was the home of a Capuchin mission. The name of the town is doubtless originally from the Carib language. It was said that there was a chief named Caripe, whose son, named Caripito ('little Caripe') went down the Caripe river towards its confluence with the Río San Juan (which empties into the Golfo de Paria near the Orinoco River delta) and founded the town of Caripito in the lowlands. It is not clear how much history lies behind the legend.

== Geography ==
Caripe is located in the mountainous north of the state of Monagas in eastern Venezuela.

=== Climate ===
The climate of the area is exceptionally pleasant, a result of its altitude (much of it 1000 m. [3000 ft.] and higher), latitude (about 10° N), and proximity to the Caribbean Sea. The mountains of the Cordillera de Caripe (Caripe Range) are relatively low, compared to the Andes in the west of Venezuela, with Cerro Turumiquire (sometimes spelt and presumably then pronounced as Turimiquire) the highest at 2595 m., followed by Cerro Negro at 2430 m. They are rounded mountains, covered with lush vegetation, like the Appalachian mountains in the United States; the limestone scenery reminded Alexander von Humboldt of Derbyshire in England which has similar limestone geology.

== Economy ==
The soil of the Caripe Valley is very fertile. Truck gardens, fruit orchards (particularly citrus and many varieties of bananas) and other farming can be found in the Caripe valley, with coffee plantations and grazing of animals in more mountainous areas. Tourism is also an important source of income to the area.

== Cueva del Guacharo ==
The oilbird's scientific name, Steatornis caripensis, means 'fat-bearing bird of Caripe'; the squabs were harvested by the local Indians in Humboldt's time, and rendered for oil. They are now protected, as the cave was Venezuela's first-designated national monument (the "Monumento Nacional Alejandro de Humboldt"). The cave is the centerpiece of the Cueva del Guácharo National Park, which was created in 1975 to protect the birds' environment.

== Other interesting places ==
Caripe has been known as a place where berries grow. There are a few stores that sell strawberries with cream. These stores have been an attractive tourist stop for many years and they also sell many byproducts (e.g. jams, mermelades, wines, etc.). Albeit strawberries had been grown for a period of time under the auspice of U.D.O. (Universidad de Oriente), they are no longer grown there in significant quantities. Most strawberries nowadays come from the western part of Venezuela (e.g. Mérida, Barinas, San Cristobal, etc).

There are a few small farms that grow organic berries such as: Raspberries (frambuesas) and blackberries (moras).

There are a number of places in the mountains round about where you can see Caripe and its beautiful landscapes.

There is a private and only zoo in Caripe, called Animania Zoo. It is located in the Alto de las Brisas area of Caripe. The zoo keep local native animal of Venezuela, and is dedicated to rehabilitation and conservation of wildlife.
