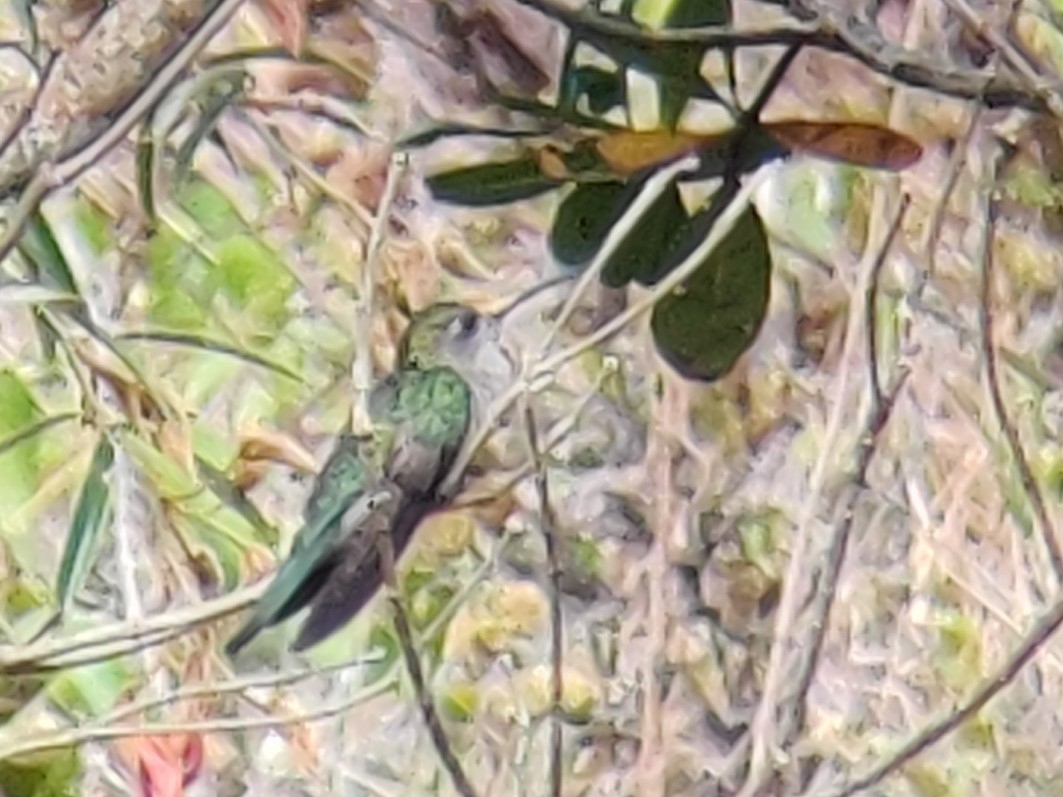

Conservation status
- Near Threatened (IUCN 3.1)
- CITES Appendix II

Scientific classification
- Kingdom: Animalia
- Phylum: Chordata
- Class: Aves
- Clade: Strisores
- Order: Apodiformes
- Family: Trochilidae
- Genus: Campylopterus
- Species: C. diamantinensis

Binomial name
- Campylopterus diamantinensis Ruschi, 1963

= Diamantina sabrewing =

Species of hummingbird

The Diamantina sabrewing (Campylopterus diamantinensis) is a Near-threatened species of hummingbird in the "emeralds", tribe Trochilini of subfamily Trochilinae. It is endemic to southeastern Brazil.

== Taxonomy and systematics ==
The Diamantina sabrewing was formerly considered to be a subspecies of the grey-breasted sabrewing (Campylopterus largipennis). In a 2017 paper Lopes et al. provided convincing evidence that it deserved species status. Starting in 2020 the South American Classification Committee of the American Ornithological Society and worldwide taxonomic systems agreed, recognizing the Diamantina sabrewing. It is monotypic.

== Description ==
The Diamantina sabrewing is a large hummingbird, about 13.4 cm (5.3 in) long. Males weigh about 8.5 g (0.30 oz) and females 8.0 g (0.28 oz). The sexes have almost identical plumage including a white spot behind the eye. Their bill is long and slightly decurved; the maxilla is black and the mandible whitish with a brownish tip. Male's upperparts are dark grass green with a darker crown and their underparts dark gray. Their tail's central two pairs of feathers are metallic bronze-green. The other three pairs have bright bronze-green bases that grades through dark olive gray to a wide white tip. The female differs only by being a slightly duller green.

== Distribution and habitat ==
The Diamantina sabrewing is found only in the Espinhaço Range of southeastern Brazil's Minas Gerais state. It inhabits forested streams and ravines in campos rupestre, a high elevation, dry, fire-prone biome between 1,000 and 2,000 m (3,300 and 6,600 ft). The type locality is Córrego das Pedras in the municipality of Diamantina.

== Behavior ==
=== Movement ===
The Diamantina sabrewing's movements, if any, have not been documented.

=== Feeding ===
The Diamantina sabrewing's foraging strategy and diet are not known but are assumed to be similar to those of its former "parent" the grey-breasted sabrewing.

=== Breeding ===
Nothing is known about the Diamantina sabrewing's breeding phenology.

=== Vocalization ===
The Diamantina sabrewing's vocalizations are very poorly known. As of mid-2022 xeno-canto has no recordings and the Cornell Lab of Ornithology's Macaulay Library only two. The species' original description noted that its alarm call is "a strong, rapidly repeated single note: ché, ché, ché, ché, ché, ché."

== Status ==
The IUCN has assessed the Diamantina sabrewing as Near Threatened. It has a very small range and its population size is unknown and believed to be decreasing. Its already restricted habitat is projected to further decrease in area due to climate change. Its habitat "is not presently experiencing major direct human disturbance" and part of it is protected in two national parks.
