= Acosta Municipality, Monagas =

Acosta
- Municipality
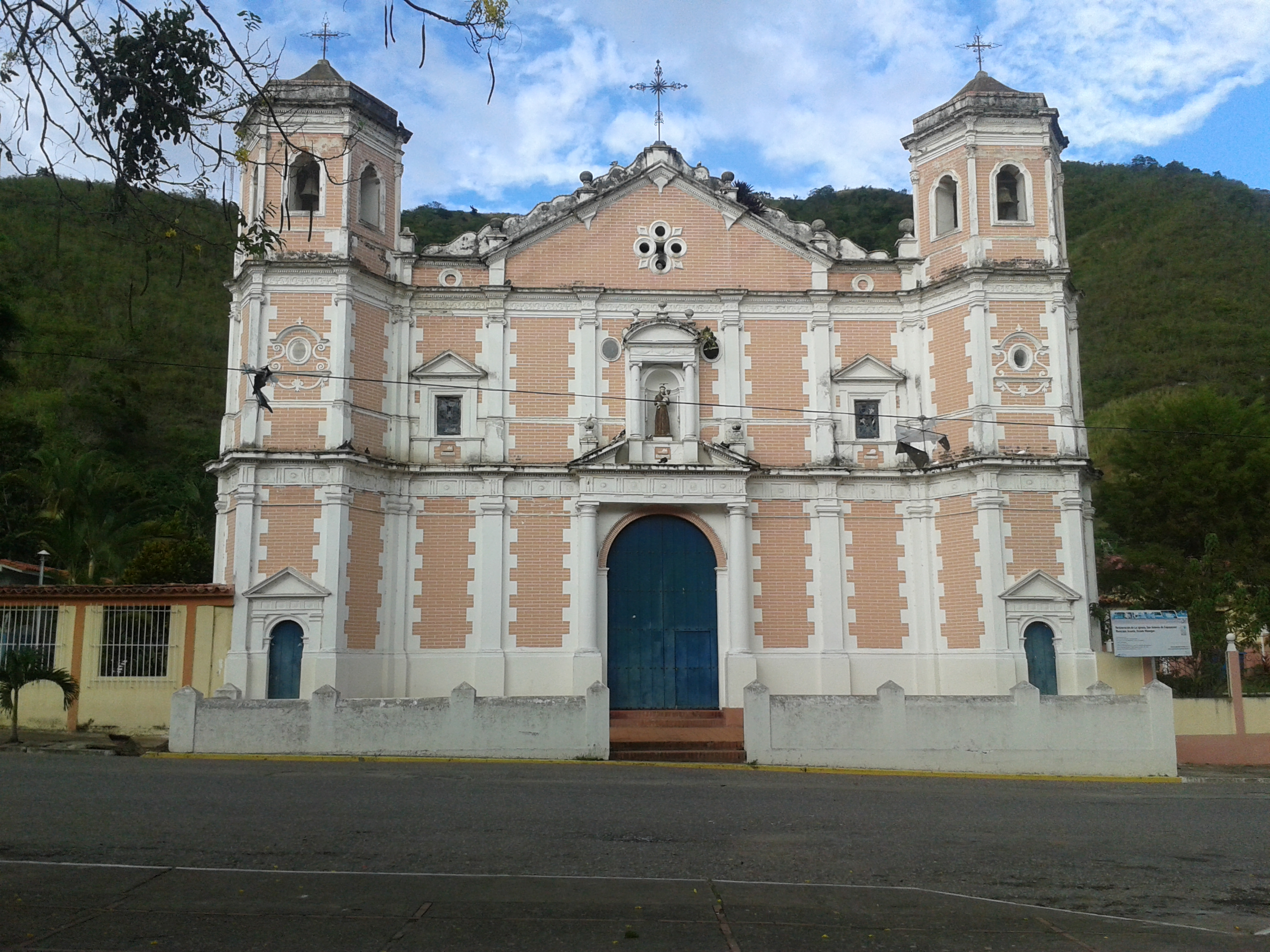

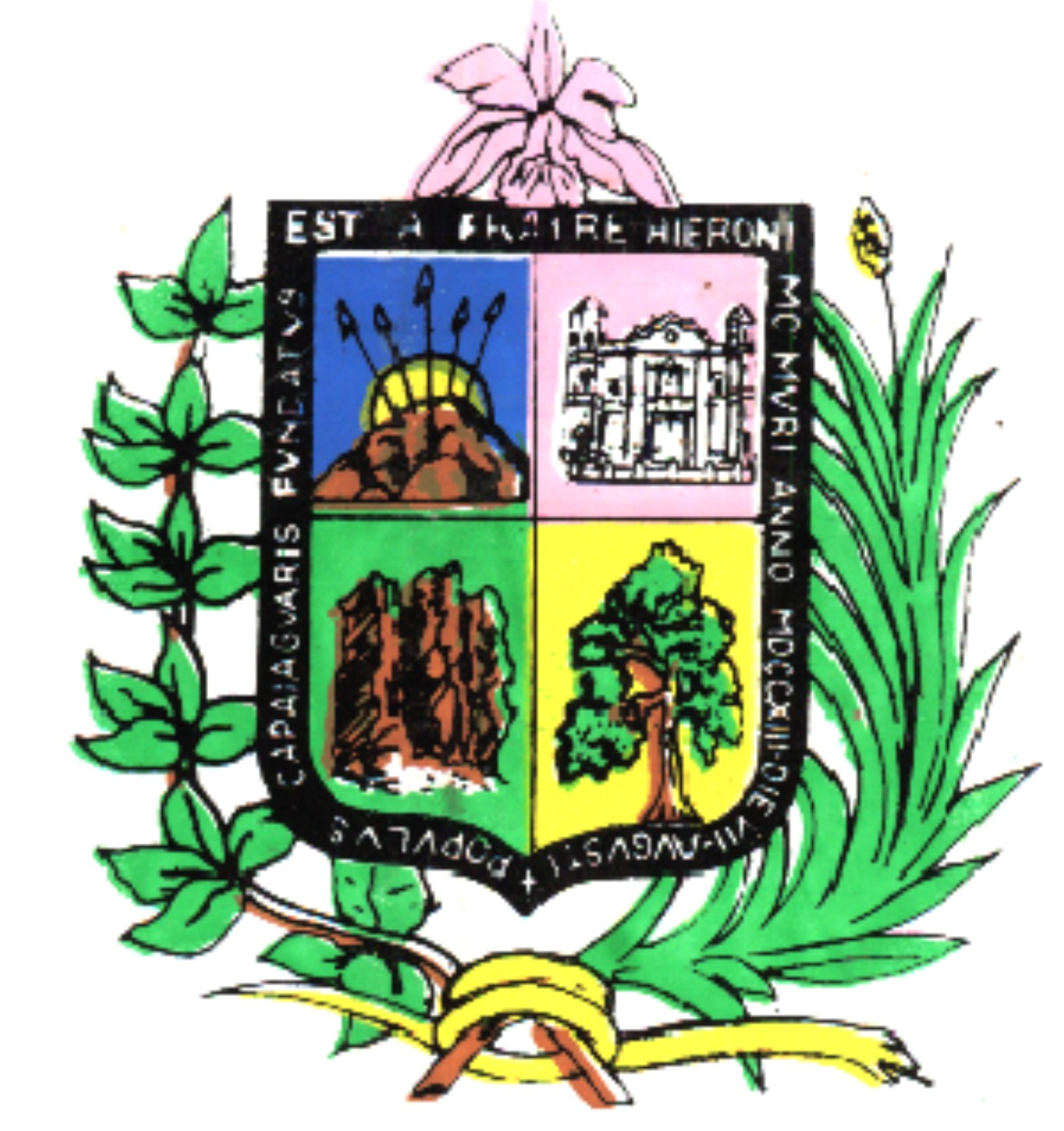
- Flag Coat of arms

- Location of Acosta Municipality in Monagas
- Coordinates: 10.1119°N 63.7229°W
- Country: Venezuela
- State: Monagas
- Founded: 10 May 1714
- Founder: Guillermo de Mallorca

Government
  - Mayor: Jesús Velásquez (MUD)

Population (2011)
  - Municipality: 18,218
  - Urban: 10,447
  - Rural: 7,771
- Time zone: UTC−4 (VET)

Acosta is one of the 13 municipalities of the state of Monagas, Venezuela. Its capital is San Antonio de Maturín. It has an area of 957 km^{2} and, according to INE, its population in 2010 there were 21,506 inhabitants. The municipality is made up of two parishes, San Antonio and San Francisco. Its name derives from the politician and leader, José Eusebio Acosta Peña.

== History ==
Much of the municipality was founded by the monastery. The town of San Antonio de Capayacuar was founded on 7 August 1713, by the Capuchin missionary Fray Gerónimo de Muro, with the help of the indigenous people of the region and of the Caribbeans. San Antonio de Capayacuar is also known as San Antonio de Maturín.

On 10 May 1714, the town of San Francisco de Guayareguar was founded by Fray Guillermo de Mallorca.

In 1814, Los Caballos community was accentuated on one side of the Colorado River. The populations of El Culantrillo and La Cagua were formed by neighboring states on the year 1875. By 1890, the community of Las Piedras de San Antonio was born by the Guanaguana Indians.

By early 1912, the Quiriquire community began to form.

With the project to build the Guamos dam, the town of Jobo Mocho was founded in 1970.

It was in 1989 that it became official as a municipality, and was made up of two parishes.

On 1 January 2011, Raúl Véliz was reelected as president of the Acosta Municipal Council.

By the end of August 2012, the flooding of the Cocollar River left the Las Delicias de San Antonio sector cut off. Similarly, heavy rains affected the areas of La Pica, Tropezón, Río Cocollar, Puente de Miraflores, Triste and Cerro Negro.

Mayor Edgar Gutiérrez inaugurated the Valle de Capayacuar restaurant on 4 June 2013, located on Bolívar Avenue in San Antonio de Capayacuar.

In November 2014, the Lucía Guzmán Women's Institute was created, inaugurated by Carmen Graciela Fernández, wife of Mayor Leansy Astudillo.

On 26 January 2017, Mayor Leansy Astudillo and Monagas State Governor Yelitza Santaella inaugurated the "Robert Serra" dining room at the "Manuel Saturnino Peñalver" Bolivarian high school in the Rómulo Gallego sector, in San Antonio de Capayacuar. On 10 December 2017, municipal elections were held and Justino Araguayan was elected for the 2017–2021 period.

== Geography ==
It has the tropical climate of a humid forest with temperatures between 15 and 27 °C and average annual precipitation of 975 mm. The main water courses are the Guarapiche River and the Colorado River.

== Economy ==
Acosta is mainly agricultural. Among the main production items are coffee, citrus fruits and vegetables although corn is also produced.

=== Tourism ===
- The Doors of Miraflores (Las Puertas de Miraflores) are two mountains separated by the Guarapiche River.

== Politics and government ==
=== Mayors ===
- Leansy Astudillo (PSUV). 2017–2021.
- Jesús Velásquez (MUD). 2021–present.
