= Soberanía National Park =

National park in Panama

- Parque Nacional Soberanía
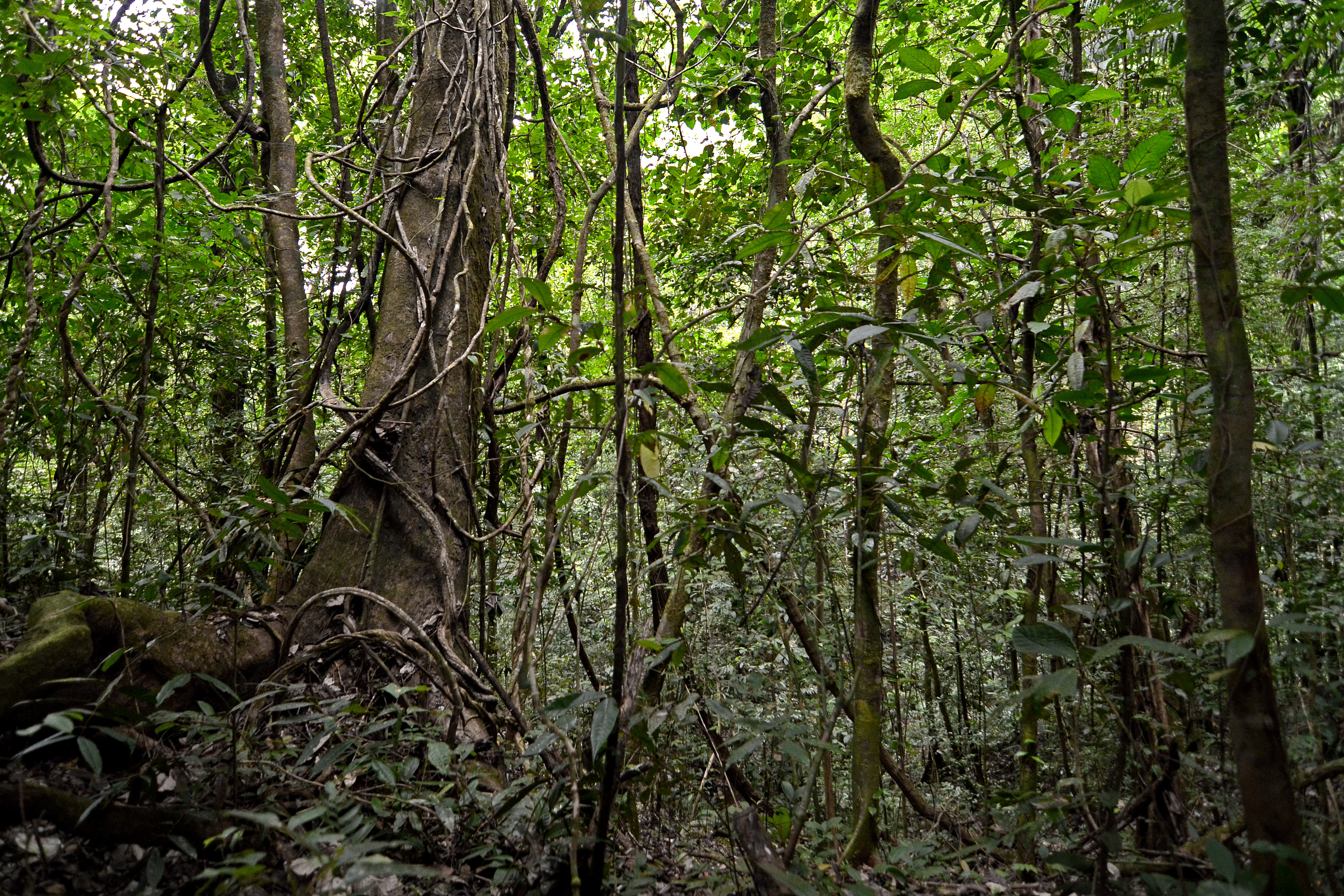
- Soberanía National Park

- Location within Panama
- Location: Panamá and Colón Provinces, Panama
- Nearest city: Panama City
- Coordinates: 9.0742977°N 79.6598053°W
- Area: 55,000 acres (220 km^{2})
- Established: 1980
- Website: Official website

Soberanía National Park (Parque Nacional Soberanía) is a national park in Panama near the banks of the Panama Canal in the provinces of Panamá and Colón, some 25 kilometres (16 mi) from Panama City. The Chagres River runs through the park. Established as a national park in 1980, the park covers 55,000 acres (220 km^{2}).

Visitors to the Soberanía National Park can also explore the Las Cruces Trail (Camino de Cruces). This historical trail dates back to the 16th century and was used by the Spanish to transport gold. Parts of the trail are still lined with old stones that once marked the trail's original path.

The land that is now the Parque Municipal Summit was originally included in this park, but was turned over to Panama City in 1985.

== Birdwatching and fauna ==
The park is popular with birdwatchers due to its abundance of bird species; some 525 bird species are found here. Pipeline Road extends for 17.5 km north–south through the park and passes through old-growth and secondary forest. Pipeline Road (Camineo del Oleoducto) is one of the best places to see tropical birds in the Americas, with a bird species list exceeding 400. The park has been designated an Important Bird Area (IBA) by BirdLife International.

=== Birds ===
Birds regularly seen along Pipeline Road include double-toothed kite, slaty-backed forest-falcon, orange-chinned parakeet, brown-hooded parrot, blue-headed parrot, red-lored parrot, squirrel cuckoo, white-necked jacobin, violet-bellied hummingbird, crowned woodnymph, blue-chested hummingbird, white-tailed trogon, gartered trogon, Amazonian black-throated trogon, black-tailed trogon, slaty-tailed trogon, black-mandibled toucan, keel-billed toucan, collared aracari, black-cheeked woodpecker, cinnamon woodpecker, crimson-crested woodpecker, white-whiskered puffbird, broad-billed motmot, rufous motmot, northern barred woodcreeper, cocoa woodcreeper, black-striped woodcreeper, fasciated antshrike, black-crowned antshrike, checker-throated stipplethroat, dot-winged antwren, white-flanked antwren, spotted antbird, bicolored antbird, ocellated antbird, chestnut-backed antbird, black-faced antthrush, southern bentbill, brownish twistwing, olivaceous flatbill, ruddy-tailed flycatcher, bright-rumped attila, purple-throated fruitcrow, red-capped manakin, blue-crowned manakin, golden-collared manakin, bay wren, song wren, gray-headed tanager, white-shouldered tanager, red-throated ant-tanager, blue-black grosbeak, scarlet-rumped cacique, and yellow-rumped cacique.

=== Mammals ===
The park is home to 100+ species of mammals, including elusive predators such as the jaguarundi, jaguar, margay, ocelot, oncilla and puma. Beyond these feline carnivores, other mammalian species to be seen include the agouti, brocket deer, bush dog, capybara, coyote, crab-eating fox, crab-eating raccoon, four-eyed opossum, Geoffroy's tamarin, gray fox, grison, hognosed skunk, kinkajou, long-tailed weasel, mantled howler monkey, neotropical river otter, nine-banded armadillo, olingo, paca, Panamanian night monkeys, peccary (both white-lipped and collared), three species of prehensile-tailed porcupines, several species of two-toed and three-toed sloth, raccoon, rice rats, silky anteater, southern and northern tamandua, spiny rats, Geoffroy's spider monkey, tapir, tayra, Virginia opossum, water opossum, Panamanian white-faced capuchin, white-nosed coatimundi, white-tailed deer, woolly opossum, and at least 50 species of bat.

=== Amphibians and reptiles ===
Numerous herpetile species are found in the park. Several species of poison dart frog can be found in the forests, from the genera Dendrobates, Colostethus and Oophaga; Golden toads were once more common but gravely affected by the anurid-targeting chytrid fungus. Other herpetile species found in the area include green iguanas, red-eyed tree frogs, cane toads, coral snakes, boa constrictors, cat-eyed snakes, slugeater snakes, and bushmasters.

== Gallery ==
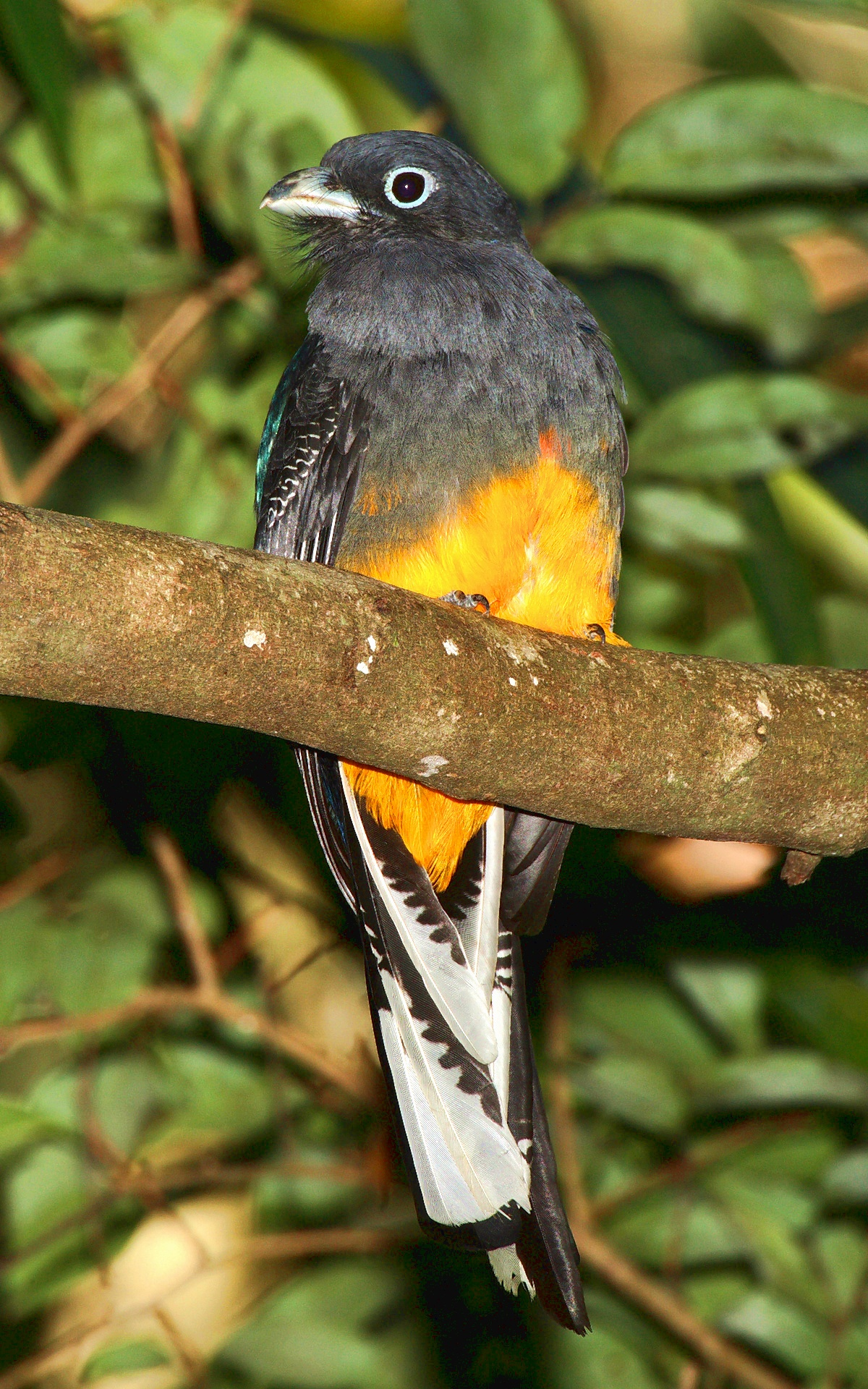
An immature male white-tailed trogon near Panama Pipeline Road, Parque Nacional Soberania

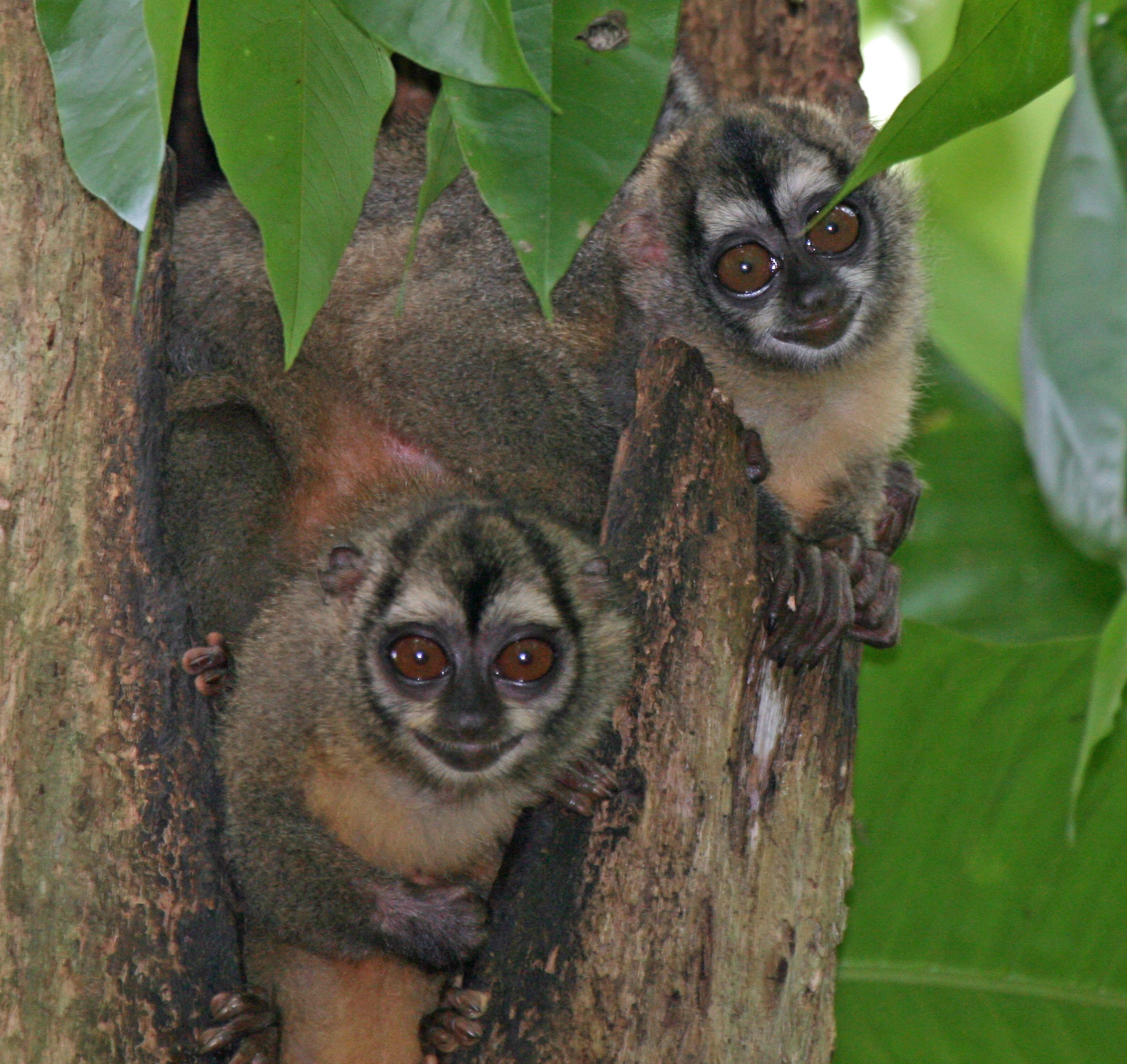
Panamanian night monkeys (Aotus zonalis) in Soberania National Park, Panama
