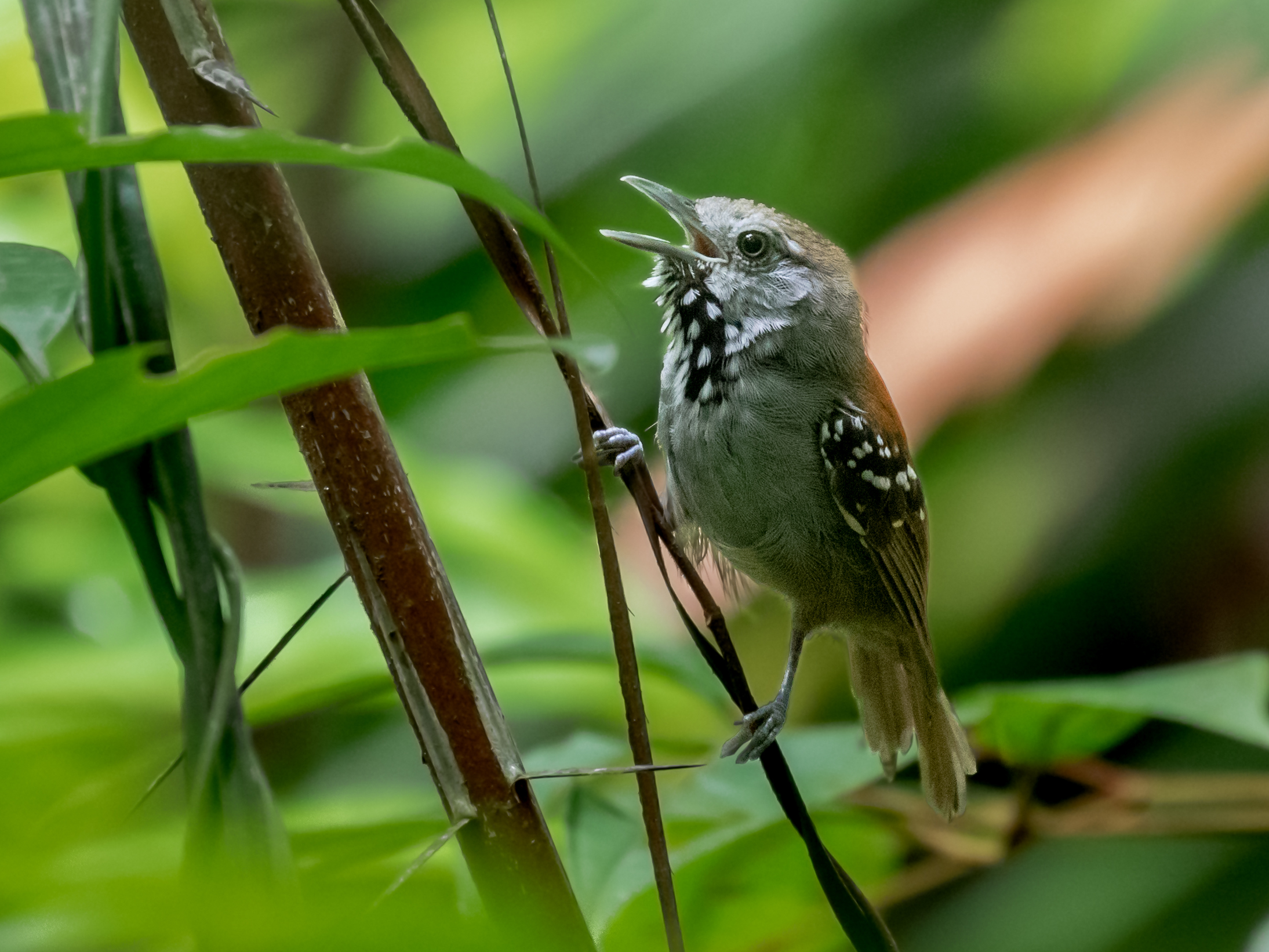
- male

Conservation status
- Least Concern (IUCN 3.1)

Scientific classification
- Kingdom: Animalia
- Phylum: Chordata
- Class: Aves
- Order: Passeriformes
- Family: Thamnophilidae
- Genus: Epinecrophylla
- Species: E. amazonica

Binomial name
- Epinecrophylla amazonica (Ihering, HFA, 1905)

Subspecies
- See text

= Rio Madeira stipplethroat =

Species of bird

The Rio Madeira stipplethroat (Epinecrophylla amazonica) is a species of bird in subfamily Thamnophilinae of family Thamnophilidae, the "typical antbirds". It is found in Bolivia, Brazil, and Peru. In the past it has also been called eastern stipple-throated antwren, Madeira stipple-throated antwren, Rio Madeira antwren, and Madeira antwren.

== Taxonomy and systematics ==
The Rio Madeira stipplethroat was long treated as a subspecies of the rufous-backed stipplethroat (previously called rufous-backed antwren Myrmotherula haematonota, now Epinecrophylla haematonota). Beginning in 2014 taxonomists recognized it as a full species.

The Rio Madeira stipplethroat has two subspecies, the nominate E. a. amazonica (von Ihering, 1905) and E. a. dentei (Whitney, BM et al., 2013). Subspecies E. a. dentei was originally described as a species but was soon recognized in its current placement.

== Description ==
The Rio Madeira stipplethroat is 10 to 11 cm (3.9 to 4.3 in) long and weighs 8.7 to 9 g (0.31 to 0.32 oz). Adult males of the nominate subspecies have a mottled yellowish brown face and a white throat with black streaks. They have a dark yellowish brown crown, a slightly redder nape, and a dark red mantle, back, rump, and uppertail coverts. Their tail is olive-gray. Their primary wing coverts are blackish with reddish tips, the rest of the wing coverts dark brown with yellowish buff tips, and the flight feathers dark red. Their underparts are gray. Their iris is brownish red. Adult females have duller red upperparts than males. Their throat is dull yellow-brown with obscure dark marks. Their underparts are pale yellowish brown. Their iris is grayish or pale beige. Both sexes have a dark gray bill, legs, and feet. Males of subspecies E. a. dentei have a buffy throat with black streaks and a tail that is almost as red as the back. Females have a paler and grayer belly than the nominate.

== Distribution and habitat ==
The nominate subspecies E. a. amazonica of the Rio Madeira stipplethroat is found in south-central Amazonian Brazil from the watershed of the Juruá River east to the Madeira River, in Peru's Department of Madre de Dios, and in far northern Bolivia's Pando Department. Subspecies E. a. dentei is found in Brazil in the watershed of the Aripuanã and Machado rivers east of the Madeira. The area spans southern Amazonas, northwestern Mato Grosso, and northeastern Rondônia states. The species primarily inhabits lowland terra firme evergreen forest. In Bolivia it also occurs in more upland forest. In elevation it ranges only up to 400 m (1,300 ft).

== Behavior ==
=== Movement ===
The Rio Madeira stipplethroat is believed to be a year-round resident throughout its range.

=== Feeding ===
The Rio Madeira stipplethroat feeds on arthropods, especially insects and spiders. It typically forages singly, in pairs, or in small family groups, and usually as part of a mixed-species feeding flock. It mostly forages in the forest understory up to about 3 m (10 ft) above the ground. It takes its prey almost entirely by gleaning from dead leaves on trees but also from dead leaves caught in vine tangles and small palms.

=== Breeding ===
Nothing is known about the Rio Madeira stipplethroat's breeding biology.

=== Vocalization ===
The Rio Madeira stipplethroat's song is similar to that of the rufous-backed stipplethroat, which is an "extr. high, very thin, descending, rapid shiver 'tsititi---' " that lasts two or three seconds but slower and with longer notes and intervals between them. Its calls appear to be the same as the rufous-backed's, a "doublet of abrupt notes, second higher-pitched", an "abrupt single note", and a "high-pitched rattle".

== Status ==
The IUCN has assessed the Rio Madeira stipplethroat as being of Least Concern. It has a large range; its population size is not known and is believed to be stable. No immediate threats have been identified. It appears to be fairly common throughout its range, "which contains large, contiguous expanses of intact habitat which, although not formally protected, appear to be at minimal risk of development in the near term".
