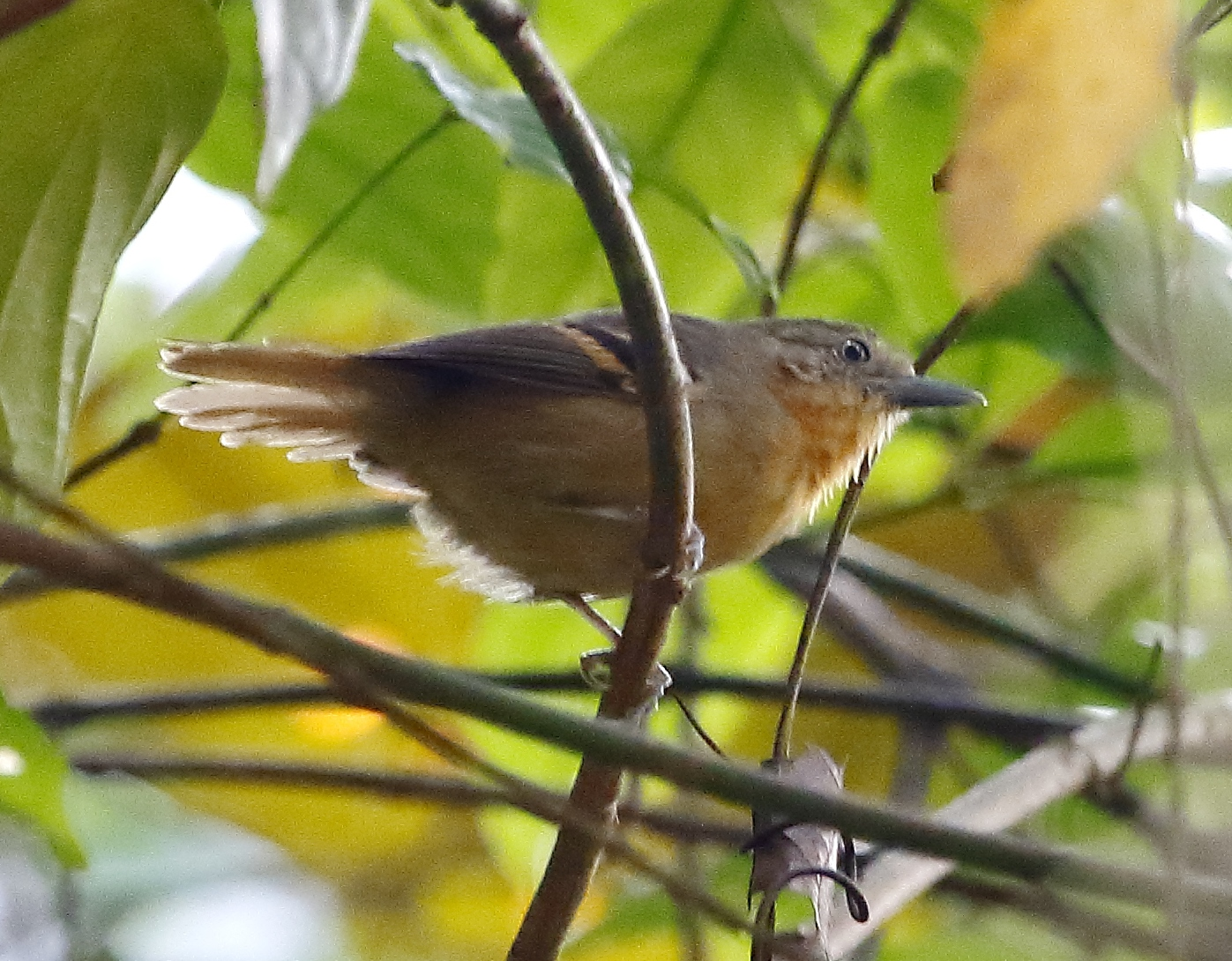
- female

Conservation status
- Least Concern (IUCN 3.1)

Scientific classification
- Kingdom: Animalia
- Phylum: Chordata
- Class: Aves
- Order: Passeriformes
- Family: Thamnophilidae
- Genus: Epinecrophylla
- Species: E. leucophthalma

Binomial name
- Epinecrophylla leucophthalma (Pelzeln, 1868)

Subspecies
- See text

= White-eyed stipplethroat =

Species of bird

The white-eyed stipplethroat, previously called white-eyed antwren (Epinecrophylla leucophthalma), is a species of bird in the family Thamnophilidae. It is found in Bolivia, Brazil, and Peru.

== Taxonomy and systematics ==
The white-eyed stipplethroat was described by the Austrian ornithologist August von Pelzeln in 1868 and given the binomial name Formicivora leucophthalma. It was later placed in genus Myrmotherula and still later, based on genetic and vocal studies, it and seven other members of the genus were moved to genus Epinecrophylla. All were eventually named "stipplethroats" to highlight a common feature and to set them apart from Myrmotherula antwrens.

The white-eyed stipplethroat has these four subspecies:

- E. l. dissita (Bond, 1950)
- E. l. leucophthalma (Pelzeln, 1868)
- E. l. phaeonota (Todd, 1927)
- E. l. sordida (Todd, 1927)

Subspecies E. l. dissita E. l. phaeonota and E. l. sordida were originally placed in genus Myrmotherula, and E. l. phaeonota was originally described as a subspecies of the rufous-backed stipplethroat (then Myrmotherula haematonota).

== Description ==
The white-eyed stipplethroat is 9.5 to 11 cm (3.7 to 4.3 in) long and weighs 8 to 10.5 g (0.28 to 0.37 oz). Adult males of the nominate subspecies E. l. leucophthalma have a mostly gray-brown face and a black throat with white spots. They have a gray-brown crown and upperparts, and reddish tail and flight feathers. Their wing coverts are blackish brown with large cinnamon-tinged white tips. Their breast and upper belly are gray that becomes gray that gains an ochraceous tinge towards the vent area. Their iris is pale and is believed to darken with age. Adult females have a mostly light olive-brown face and a cinnamon throat. Their underparts are light olive-brown with a variable cinnamon tinge in the center of the breast and upper belly. Males of subspecies E. l. sordida have white tips on the wing coverts, and females have a stronger cinnamon tinge on their underparts than the nominate. Males of E. l. dissita have cinnamon tips on the wing coverts and females have a weaker cinnamon tinge on their underparts than the nominate. Both sexes of E. l. phaeonota have mostly reddish brown upperparts.

== Distribution and habitat ==
The subspecies of the white-eyed stipplethroat are found thus:

- E. l. dissita: Peru's Department of Puno and Bolivia's La Paz Department
- E. l. leucophthalma: northwestern Peru (disjunct), and from the Ucayali River in eastern Peru east into western Brazil south of the Amazon River as far as the Madeira River and south into northern Bolivia's Pando and Santa Cruz departments
- E. l. phaeonota: Brazil south of the Amazon between the Tapajós and Tocantins rivers
- E. l. sordida: Brazil south of the Amazon between the Madeira and Tapajos rivers

The white-eyed stipplethroat mostly inhabits lowland terra firme and transitional evergreen forest. It favors areas with a dense understory with many dead leaves, both attached and caught in vine tangles and palm thickets. In Bolivia it occurs almost exclusively in bamboo stands, in eastern Peru it is found in them as well as in forest, and in Mato Grosso Brazil is almost never found in bamboo.

== Behavior ==
=== Movement ===
The white-eyed stipplethroat is believed to be a year-round resident throughout its range.

=== Feeding ===
The white-eyed stipplethroat feeds on arthropods, especially cockroaches (Blattidae), crickets (Gryllidae), katydids (Tettigoniidae), and beetles (Coleoptera). It typically forages singly, in pairs, or in small family groups, and usually as part of a mixed-species feeding flock. It mostly forages in the forest understory up to about 6 m (20 ft) above the ground but occasionally as high as 15 m (50 ft) or beyond. It takes its prey almost entirely by gleaning from dead leaves on trees and caught in vine tangles and on palms.

=== Territorial defense ===
Male white-eyed stipplethroats display to each other from perches less than 1 m (3 ft) apart; they lower their head, puff up their back plumage, sway back and forth, and continuously vocalize.

=== Breeding ===
White-eyed stipplethroats were observed nest building in Peru in mid-October. Nothing else is known about the species' breeding biology.

=== Vocalization ===
The white-eyed stipplethroat's song is a "very high, very thin, slightly descending 'tsitsitsituw' ". Its calls "include abrupt downslurred notes, sometimes in doublets and triplets, or given in regularly paced series; also a rubbery rattle".

== Status ==
The IUCN has assessed the white-eyed stipplethroat as being of Least Concern. It has a very large range; its population size is not known and is believed to be decreasing. No immediate threats have been identified. It is considered fairly common throughout its range. It occurs in several large protected areas, and "its range contains vast contiguous areas of intact habitat which, despite being currently unprotected, remain at low risk of near-term development".
