= Robb Brumfield =

American ornithologist

- Born: September 5, 1967 (age 58); Baton Rouge, Louisiana, U.S.
- Education: University of Maryland (PhD); Illinois State University (MS); Louisiana State University (BS)
- Scientific career
- Fields: Ornithology, Genetics
- Institutions: Louisiana State University

Robb Thomas Brumfield (born September 5, 1967) is an American ornithologist, Curator of Genetic Resources at the Museum of Natural Science, and Roy Paul Daniels Professor of ornithology, evolutionary biology, population genomics, and phylogenomics at Louisiana State University. He currently serves as interim dean of the LSU College of Science. He studied at LSU where he received a bachelor of science in Zoology, at Illinois State University for a masters in Biological Science, and at the University of Maryland where he obtained his PhD in Zoology. Among other professional positions he was National Science Foundation Postdoctoral Fellow in Biological Informatics at the University of Washington and a Program Director for the National Science Foundation. He was named an Elected Fellow of the AAAS in 2019 for "His work and commitment to advancing ornithological research at LSU," and "helping to grow what has become one of the world’s largest university-based tissue collections of birds." In 2025, he received the Elliot Coues Award from the AOS for "outstanding and innovative contributions to ornithological research."

== Research ==
Brumfield's research is largely centered around understanding the processes underlying the formation and maintenance of species, primarily in the American neotropics. As curator of genetic resources at the LSU MNS, he helped build their frozen tissue collection (the Collection of Genetic Resources) into the largest of its kind in the world.

== Taxa described ==
- Thamnophilus divisorius
- Epinecrophylla
- Tarphonomus
- Geocerthia
- Pseudasthenes
- Certhiasomus
- Drymotoxeres pucheranii
- Isleria
- Hafferia
