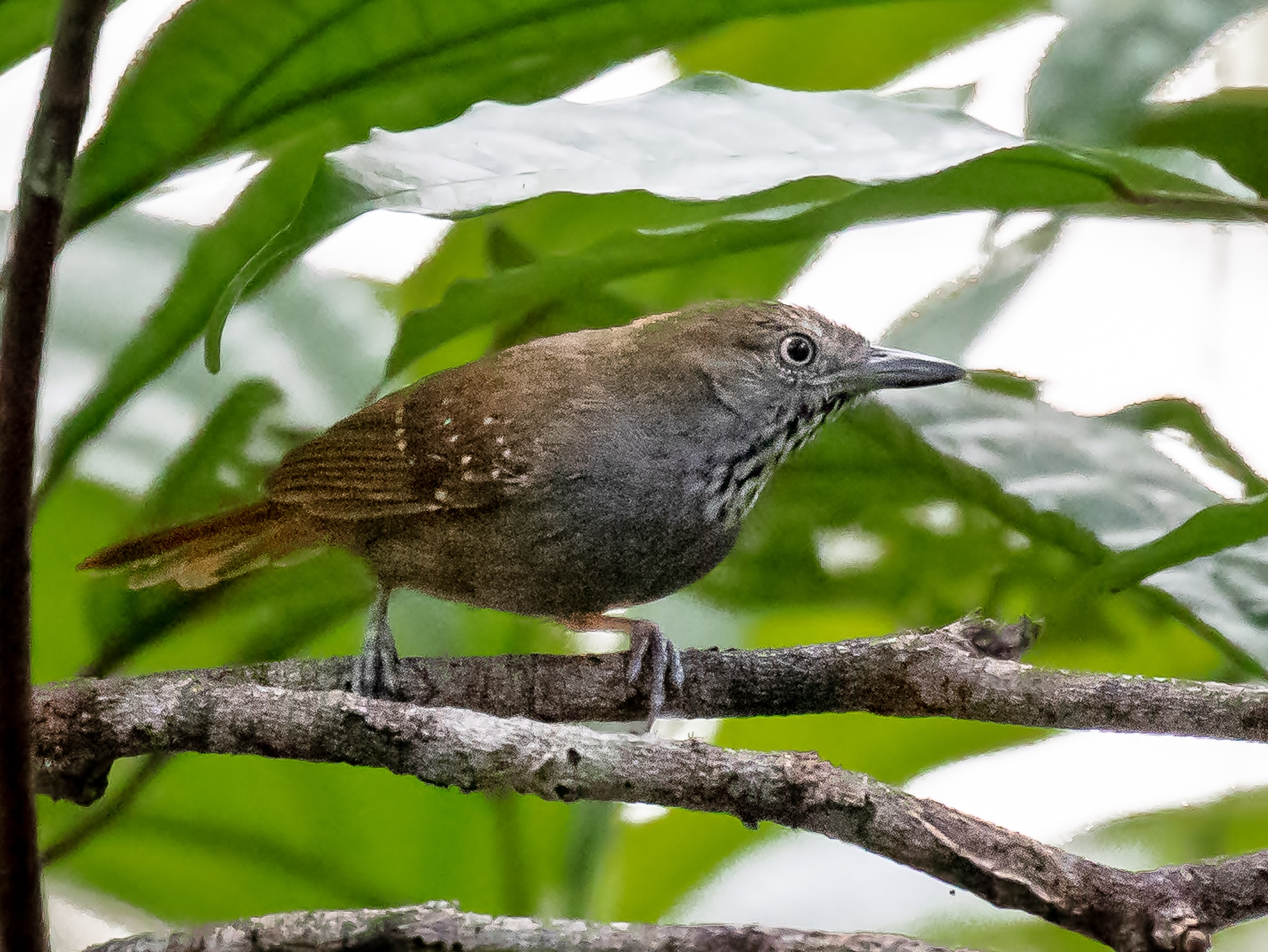
- A male at Manaus, Amazonas state, Brazil.
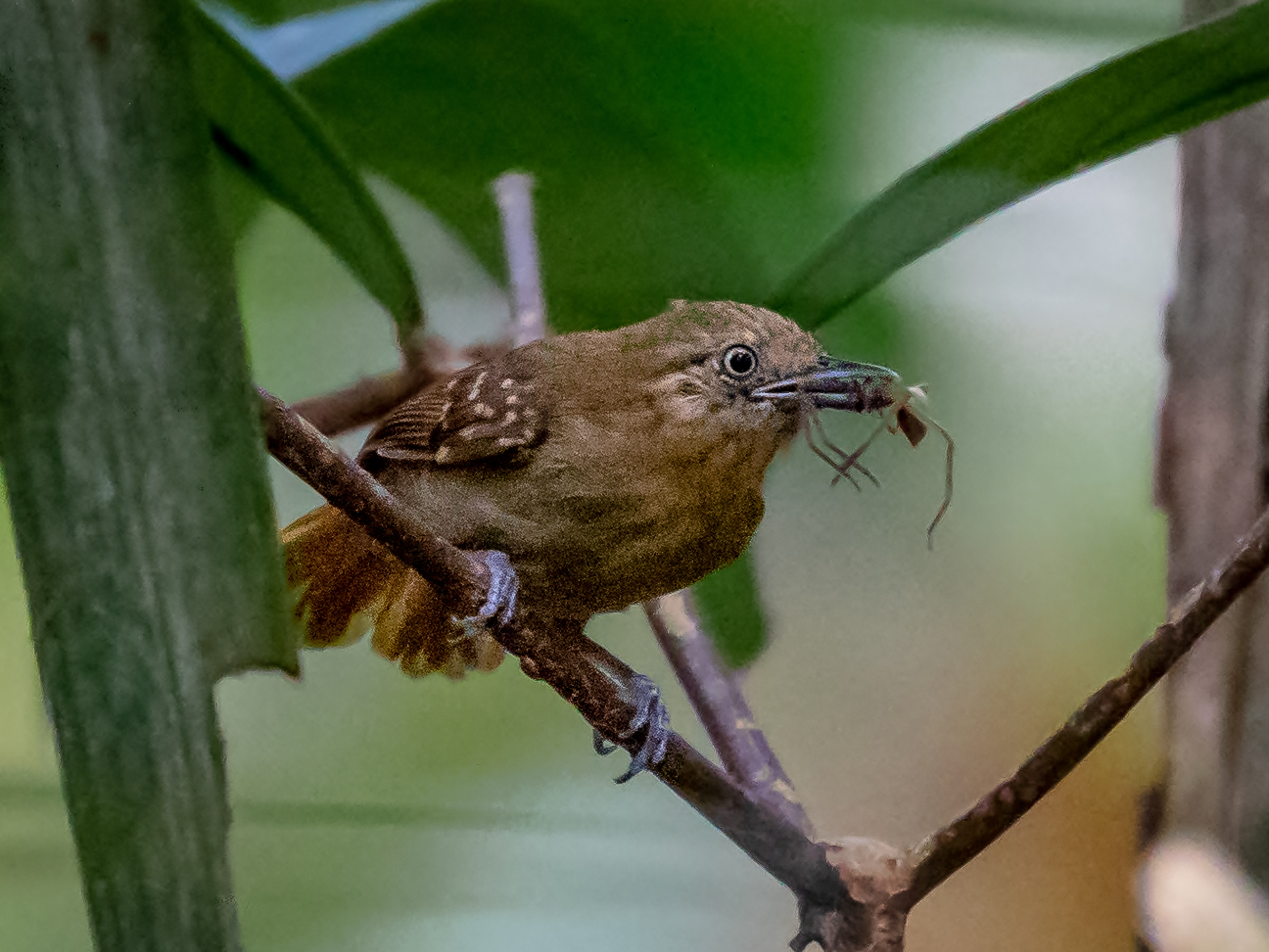
- A female at Manaus, Amazonas state, Brazil.

Conservation status
- Least Concern (IUCN 3.1)

Scientific classification
- Kingdom: Animalia
- Phylum: Chordata
- Class: Aves
- Order: Passeriformes
- Family: Thamnophilidae
- Genus: Epinecrophylla
- Species: E. gutturalis

Binomial name
- Epinecrophylla gutturalis (Sclater, PL & Salvin, 1881)

Synonyms
- Myrmotherula gutturalis

= Brown-bellied stipplethroat =

Species of bird

The brown-bellied stipplethroat, previously called brown-bellied antwren (Epinecrophylla gutturalis) is a species of bird in subfamily Thamnophilinae of family Thamnophilidae, the "typical antbirds". It is found in Brazil, French Guiana, Guyana, Suriname, and Venezuela.

== Taxonomy and systematics ==
The brown-bellied stipplethroat was described by the English ornithologists Philip Sclater and Osbert Salvin in 1881 and given the binomial name Myrmotherula gutturalis. Based on genetic and vocal studies it and seven other members of the genus were moved to the genus Epinecrophylla that was created in 2006. All were eventually named "stipplethroats" to highlight a common feature and to set them apart from Myrmotherula antwrens.

The brown-bellied stipplethroat is monotypic.

== Description ==
The brown-bellied stipplethroat is 9.5 to 10.5 cm (3.7 to 4.1 in) long and weighs 7.5 to 9.5 g (0.26 to 0.34 oz). Adult males have a mostly gray face and a black throat with white spots. They have an olive-brown crown, upperparts, tail, and flight feathers. Their wing coverts are a darker olive-brown with small white tips. Their breast and upper belly are gray that becomes gray with a clay-colored tinge towards the vent area. Adult females have a mostly pale brownish buff face and throat. Their crown and upperparts are yellowish olive-brown and their tail reddish. Their wing coverts have pink or pinkish buff tips. Their underparts are pale brownish buff that is darker on the flanks and crissum. Juveniles have large spots on the wing coverts that almost form a continuous band.

== Distribution and habitat ==
The brown-bellied stipplethroat is found from eastern Venezuela east through the Guianas and south in Brazil to the Amazon River from the Rio Branco and lower Rio Negro to the Atlantic. It inhabits the understorey of terra firme evergreen forest from sea level to 1,000 m (3,300 ft) though it mostly occurs below 600 m (2,000 ft).

== Behavior ==
=== Movement ===
The brown-bellied stipplethroat is believed to be a year-round resident throughout its range.

=== Feeding ===
The brown-bellied stipplethroat's diet is not known in detail but includes insects and spiders. It typically forages singly or in pairs, and usually as part of a mixed-species feeding flock. It mostly forages in the forest understory; some studies found that it seldom exceeds 9 m (30 ft) above the ground but others have noted it feeding as high as 15 m (50 ft). It forages mostly in vine tangles, on hanging clusters of dead leaves and in dead leaves and other debris trapped in the vines.

=== Territorial defense ===
Male brown-bellied stipplethroats display to each other from perches less than 1 m (3 ft) apart; they puff up their back plumage, flare their throat feathers, sway back and forth, and continuously vocalize.

=== Breeding ===
The brown-bellied stipplethroat's breeding season is not well known but appears to vary geographically. It nests in February and March in French Guiana and (possibly not continuously) from May to December in Brazil. Nests in French Guiana were a deep pouch of plant and fungal fibers and dead leaves suspended from the fork of a thin branch about 1.5 m (5 ft) above the ground. One in Brazil was a domed ball of twigs and leaves low to the ground in a bush. The clutch size is two eggs. The incubation period is not known; fledging occurs about 11 days after hatch. Both parents incubate the clutch and brood and provision nestlings.

=== Vocalization ===
The brown-bellied stipplethroat's song is an "extr. high, thin, shivering, descending 't-srrrrrruw' ". Its calls include a "distinctive 'chip' followed by a series of c. 5 notes that rise and fall in pitch and intensity", a "single downslurred note", and a "rubbery rattle rising and falling in pitch and intensity".

== Status ==
The IUCN originally in 2004 assessed the brown-bellied stipplethroat as being of Least Concern, then in 2012 as Threatened, and since 2022 again as of Least Concern. It has a very large range and an estimated population of more than one million mature individuals; the latter is believed to be decreasing. "Possible threats to the species include logging and mining activities, both of which appear to be increasing...their impact on overall habitat availability is currently believed to be low. Deforestation due to conversion for subsistence and industrial agriculture may however be locally higher". It is considered fairly common throughout its range. It occurs in several protected areas and in "large contiguous expanses of intact habitat which, although not formally protected, are at little current risk of development".
