= Parque Municipal Summit =

Coordinates: 9.066161°N 79.6455574°W

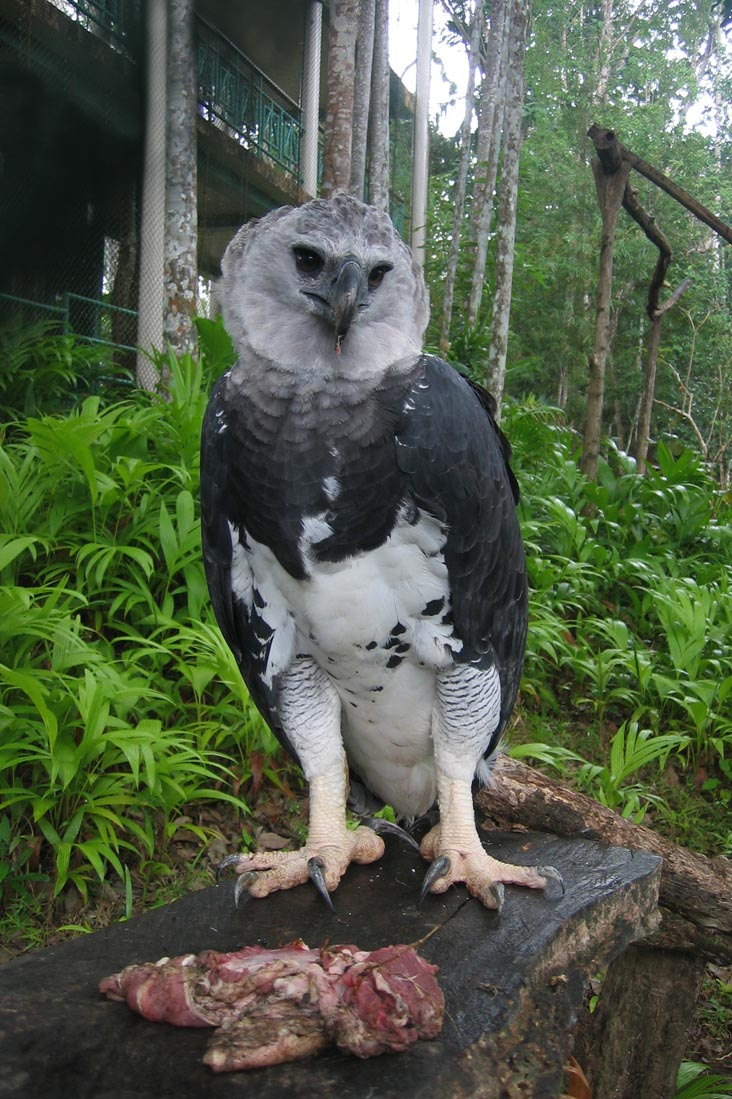
Harpy eagle at the Municipal Park Summit

The Parque Municipal Summit (Summit Municipal Park) is a botanical garden with a facility for rescue and wildlife rehabilitation of exotic and native wildlife in central Panama. Many of the animals that arrive at the rescue center that cannot be returned to the wild, are displayed to the public in a well-kept zoo. The park has 250 hectares (620 acres) in total area (of which 55 hectares (140 acres) belong to the botanical garden), which is located right next to the Soberania National Park, less than an hour's drive from Panama City, at about kilometer 18 on the road leading to Gamboa.

== History ==
The park was created in 1923 by the former company of the Panama Canal, as the Experimental Farm Summit, to test the adaptation of plants’ species from different parts of the world to the tropical climate of Panama. It was through this experimental farm that teak was introduced to the American continent.

In the 1960s a small zoo was started within the Botanical Garden. The zoo has increased gradually, and today is home to about 300 animals. One of the attractions of the zoo is the harpy eagle; the national bird of Panama.

The land was transferred back to Panama as part the Torrijos–Carter Treaties, and was part of the Soberanía National Park created by Executive Decree No. 13 on May 27, 1980. In 1985, the area covered by this park was transferred to the administration of the Mayor’s office of Panama, thus establishing the Municipal Park and part of the restructured area into a Botanical Garden, converting it into a research center for development of tropical biology and horticulture.

== Plants ==
The botanical garden includes a representation of plant species from tropical and subtropical countries around the world as well as native species of Panama. Many of them have beneficial uses for humans as food, medicines, construction materials, or ornamental use.

== Animals ==
Animals at the zoo include sloths, squirrels, alligators, owls, coyote, gray herons, gulls, parrots, jaguars, ocelots, margays, monkeys, agouti, puma, doves, foxes, lizards, and harpy eagles.
