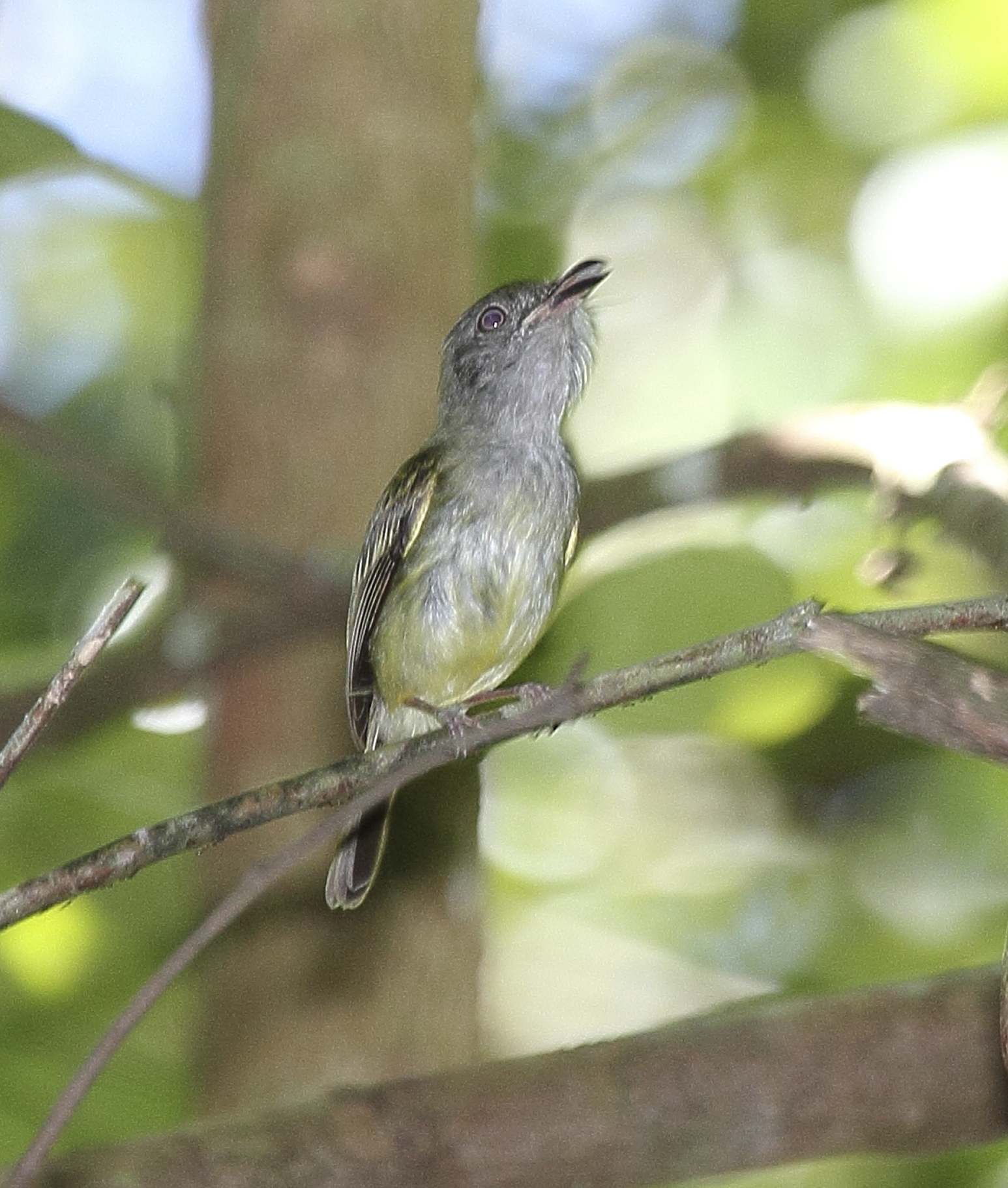

Conservation status
- Least Concern (IUCN 3.1)

Scientific classification
- Kingdom: Animalia
- Phylum: Chordata
- Class: Aves
- Order: Passeriformes
- Family: Tyrannidae
- Genus: Oncostoma
- Species: O. cinereigulare

Binomial name
- Oncostoma cinereigulare (Sclater, PL, 1857)

= Northern bentbill =

Species of bird

The northern bentbill (Oncostoma cinereigulare) is a species of bird in the family Tyrannidae, the tyrant flycatchers. It is found in Belize, Colombia, Costa Rica, El Salvador, Guatemala, Honduras, Mexico, Nicaragua, and Panama.

== Taxonomy and systematics ==
The northern bentbill was originally described in 1857 by Philip Sclater as Todirostrum cinereigulare. Sclater created its current genus Oncostoma in 1862.

The northern bentbill is monotypic. It shares genus Oncostoma with the southern bentbill (O. olivaceum); in the early twentieth century at least one author considered them to be conspecific. The two form a superspecies.

== Description ==
The northern bentbill is 9.5 to 10.5 cm (3.7 to 4.1 in) long and weighs about 4.5 to 7 g (0.16 to 0.25 oz). It has a distinctive fairly thick downcurved bill. The sexes have the same plumage. Adults have a mostly pale gray head whose crown is slightly darker. Their back, rump, and uppertail coverts are olive. Their wings are dusky with lemon yellow edges on the flight feathers and tips on the coverts; the latter show as two wing bars. Their tail is dusky. Their throat and breast are pale gray with olive streaks and their belly pale lemon-yellow with an olive wash on the flanks. They have a pale yellow iris, a gray bill with a pinkish base, and pinkish legs and feet. Juveniles have an olive crown, buffy edges on the flight feathers, buffy tips on the wing coverts, and a dusky bill.

== Distribution and habitat ==
The northern bentbill is primarily found from southern Veracruz, northern Oaxaca and the Yucatán Peninsula of southern Mexico south on the Caribbean and Pacific slopes through every Central American country into western Panama. In the last country it reaches western Colón Province on the Caribbean side and western Chiriquí Province on the Pacific side. It inhabits the interior and edges of humid lowland evergreen forest, semi-deciduous and deciduous forest, secondary woodlands, and partially open scrublands in the tropical zone. In all landscapes it favors thickets and dense undergrowth. In elevation it ranges from sea level to 1,500 m (4,900 ft) overall but reaches only about 1,100 m (3,600 ft) in Costa Rica.

A single specimen from Colombia near the Panama border was long thought to be misidentified but was eventually confirmed as being a northern bentbill. It is not known if it was a vagrant or represents a disjunct population.

== Behavior ==
=== Movement ===
The northern bentbill is a year-round resident.

=== Feeding ===
The northern bentbill feeds primarily on arthropods and occasionally on small berries. It typically forages singly or in pairs and is not known to join mixed-species feeding flocks. It forages in dense vegetation, usually near the ground but as high as 6 m (20 ft) above it. It takes prey mostly by using short upward sallies from a perch to grab it from leaves; it then typically flies to a new perch.

=== Breeding ===
The northern bentbill's breeding season has not been defined but appears to include April in El Salvador and Costa Rica. The female alone builds the nest, an elongated domed ball of plant fibers with a side entrance; sometimes fibers dangle from the bottom. It typically hangs from a twig or leaf from very near the ground up to about 4 m (13 ft) above it. The clutch is two eggs and the female alone incubates. Apparently only the female provisions nestlings as well. The incubation period and time to fledging are not known.

=== Vocalization ===
The northern bentbill's calls are "a rapid toad-like trill, turrrrrrrrrrr...a trilling prrrr're'e'e'eat!...a single turp!...an a turp!-purrrrrrrrr".

== Status ==
The IUCN has assessed the northern bentbill as being of Least Concern. It has a large range; its estimated population of at least 500,000 mature individuals is believed to be decreasing. No immediate threats have been identified. It is considered fairly common in northern Central America, common in most of Costa Rica, and uncommon on the Pacific side of northern Costa Rica. It occurs in several protected areas and "tolerates somewhat disturbed habitat".
