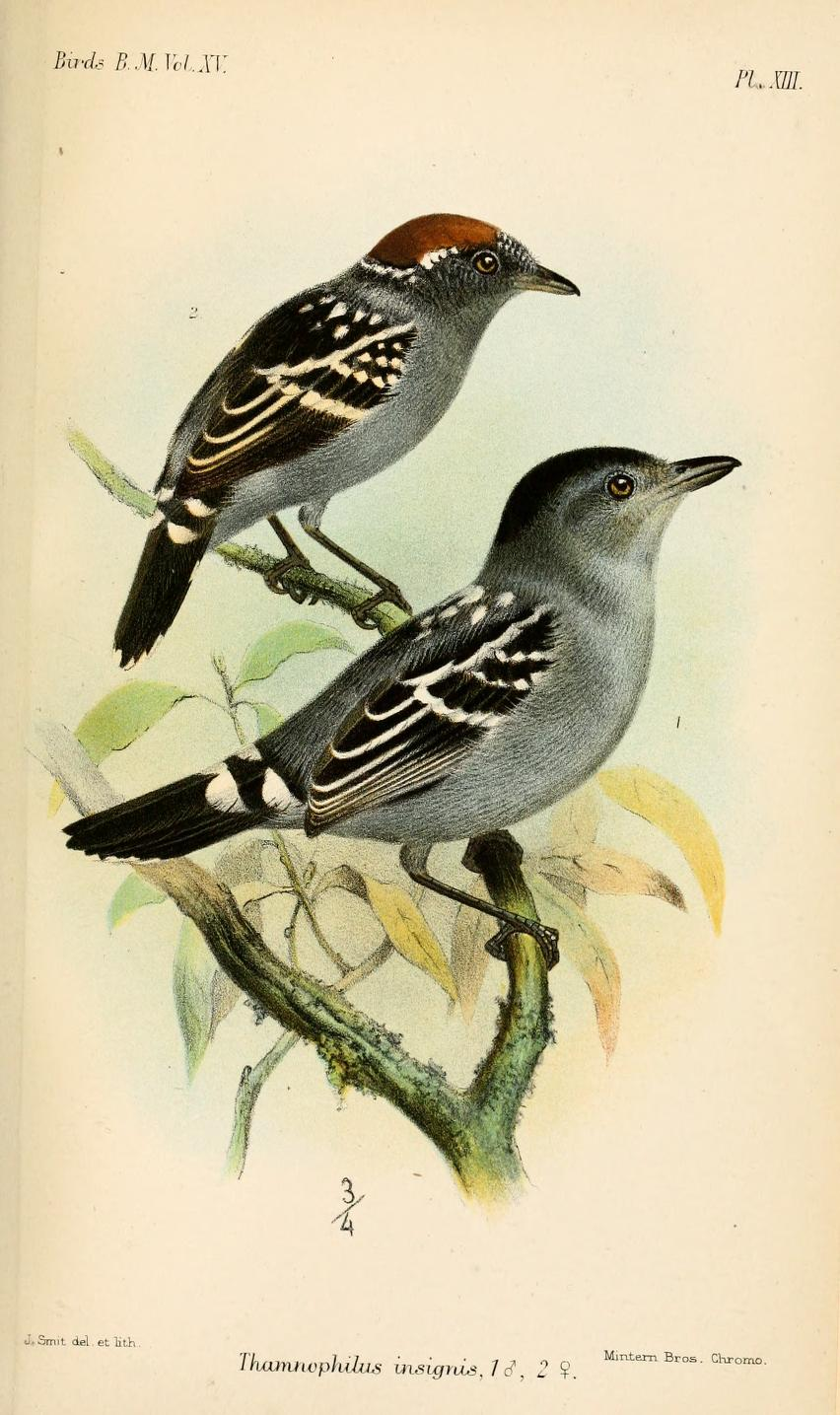
- Illustration by Joseph Smit, 1890
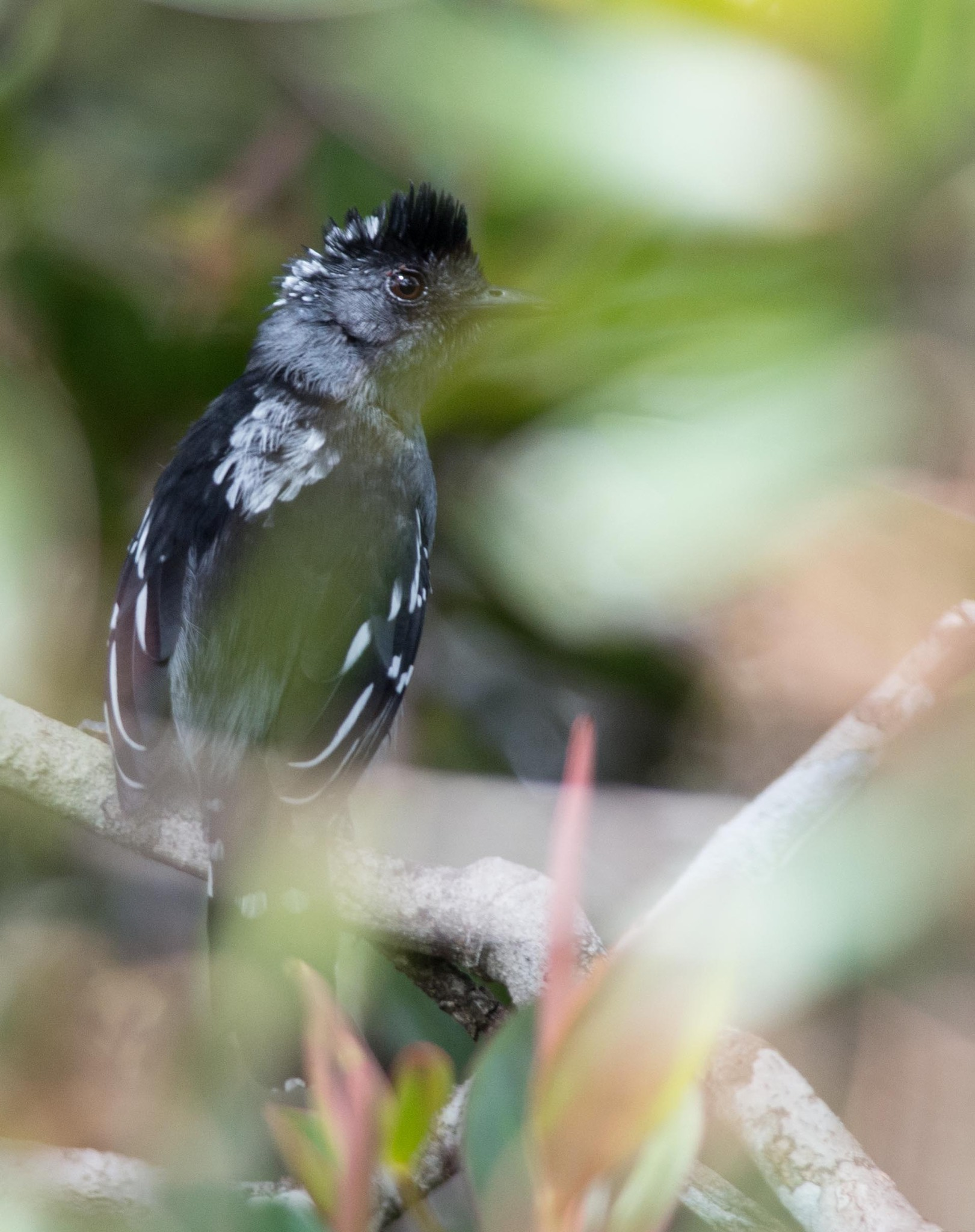

Conservation status
- Least Concern (IUCN 3.1)

Scientific classification
- Kingdom: Animalia
- Phylum: Chordata
- Class: Aves
- Order: Passeriformes
- Family: Thamnophilidae
- Genus: Thamnophilus
- Species: T. insignis

Binomial name
- Thamnophilus insignis Salvin & Godman, 1884

= Streak-backed antshrike =

Species of bird

The streak-backed antshrike (Thamnophilus insignis) is a species of bird in subfamily Thamnophilinae of family Thamnophilidae, the "typical antbirds". It is found in Brazil, Guyana, and Venezuela.

== Taxonomy and systematics ==
The streak-backed antshrike has two subspecies, the nominate T. i. insignis (Salvin & Godman, 1884) and T. i. nigrifrontalis (Phelps, WH & Phelps, WH Jr, 1947). The streak-backed and the Acre antshrike (T. divisorius) are sister species.

== Description ==
The streak-backed antshrike is 16 to 17 cm (6.3 to 6.7 in) long and weighs 22 to 30 g (0.78 to 1.1 oz). Members of genus Thamnophilus are largish members of the antbird family; all have stout bills with a hook like those of true shrikes. This species exhibits slight sexual dimorphism. Adult males of the nominate subspecies have a black crown and nape with a few white feathers on them. Their upperparts are black with a white patch between the scapulars that shows as spots or streaks. Their wings, scapulars, and wing coverts are black with white spots and edges. Their tail is black with white spots and tips on the outer feathers. Their underparts are gray with a somewhat lighter belly. Adult females resemble males in most ways. Their forehead has faint white spots, their rear crown is dark red-brown, and their underparts are somewhat paler than the male's. Males of subspecies T. i. nigrifrontalis are the same as the nominate; females have an entirely black (unspotted) forehead.

== Distribution and habitat ==
The nominate subspecies of the streak-backed antshrike is found on the tepuis where southeastern Venezuela's Bolívar and Amazonas states, extreme western Guyana, and extreme northern Brazil meet; most of that range is in Venezuela. Subspecies T. i. nigrifrontalis is found on the Cerro Sipapo massif in southern Amazonas state. The species inhabits the understorey to mid-storey of humid montane evergreen forest. It favors areas of stunted trees with a dense understorey dominated by Melastoma and Clusia vegetation and also occurs in bamboo thickets and Brocchinia scrub. It ranges between 900 and 2,000 m (3,000 and 6,600 ft) in elevation, though it is more common above 1,200 m (3,900 ft).

== Behavior ==
=== Movement ===
The streak-backed antshrike is presumed to be a year-round resident throughout its range.

=== Feeding ===
The streak-backed antshrike's diet has not been detailed but is mostly insects and other arthropods. It usually forages singly and in pairs, mostly between 1 and 5 m (3 and 16 ft) of the ground though sometimes as high as 10 m (33 ft). It hops through vegetation, gleaning prey from leaves, branches, bamboo, and individual vines and vine tangles and captures prey with reaches and lunges from a perch. It occasionally joins mixed-species feeding flocks.

=== Breeding ===
Nothing is known about the streak-backed antshrike's breeding biology.

=== Vocalization ===
Males of the streak-backed antshrike sing "a slowly accelerating, very nasal cunk, cuk cuk-cu-cu-cu-cu-cu-cu 'cu'cu'cucurank"; females sing similarly but at a higher pitch. The species' calls include a variable-length "somewhat downslurred raspy growl" and a "soft squeak or ' peep' ".

== Status ==
The IUCN has assessed the streak-backed antshrike as being of Least Concern. Its population size is not known and is believed to be decreasing. No immediate threats have been identified. It is considered uncommon to locally common in its somewhat restricted range, which includes several protect areas. "Owing to the largely inaccessible nature of the region, the tepuis have been little affected by human disturbance, and upper-elevation floras and faunas remain relatively pristine. Nevertheless, these ecosystems are considered highly sensitive to disturbance, and threats from uncontrolled burning and gold-mining do exist."
