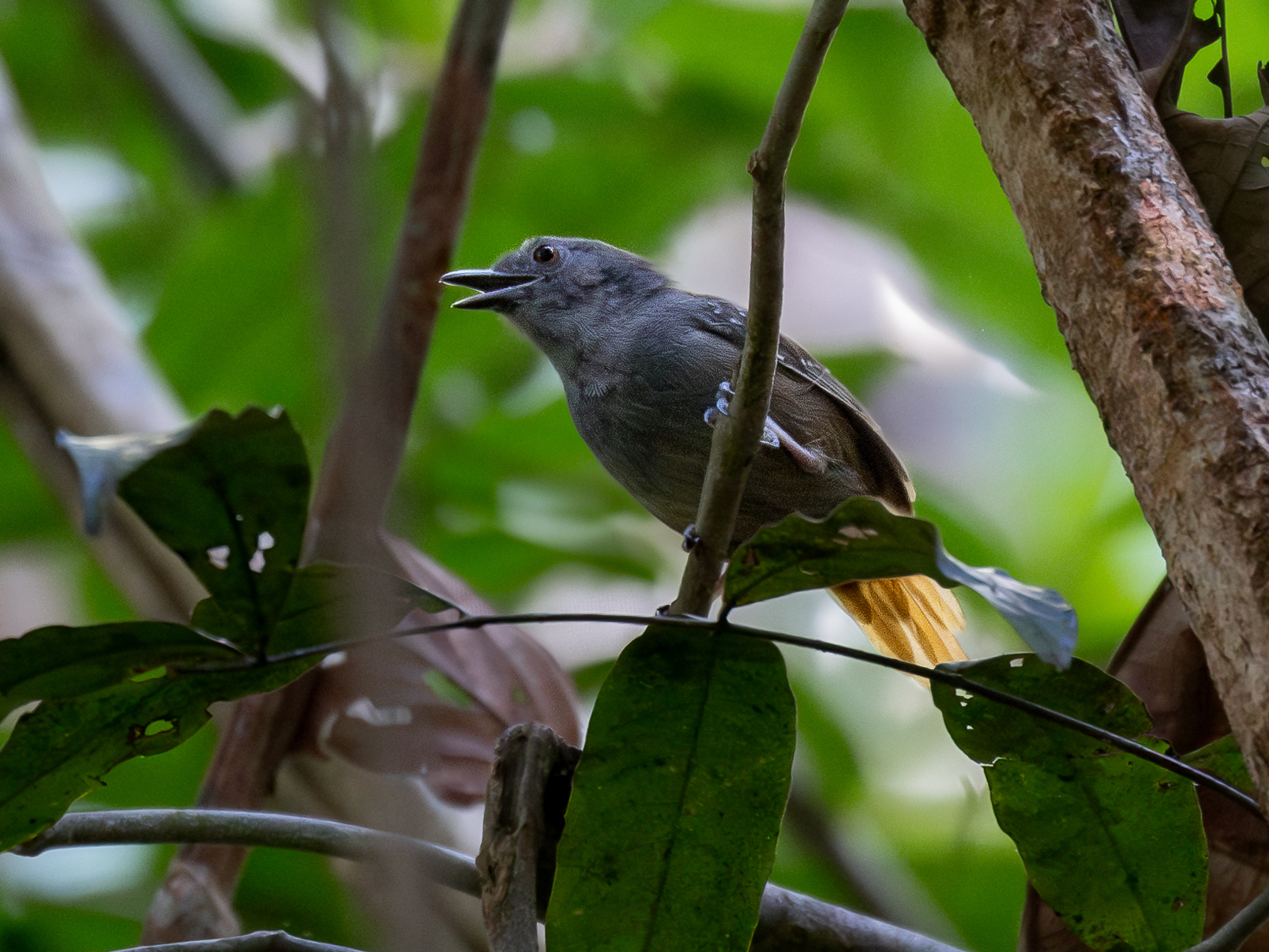
- male

Conservation status
- Least Concern (IUCN 3.1)

Scientific classification
- Kingdom: Animalia
- Phylum: Chordata
- Class: Aves
- Order: Passeriformes
- Family: Thamnophilidae
- Genus: Epinecrophylla
- Species: E. erythrura

Binomial name
- Epinecrophylla erythrura (Sclater, PL, 1890)

Subspecies
- See text

Synonyms
- Myrmotherula erythrura

= Rufous-tailed stipplethroat =

Species of bird

The rufous-tailed stipplethroat (Epinecrophylla erythrura), formerly called the rufous-tailed antwren, is a species of insectivorous bird in subfamily Thamnophilinae of family Thamnophilidae, the "typical antbirds". It is found in Brazil, Colombia, Ecuador, and Peru.

== Taxonomy and systematics ==
The rufous-tailed stipplethroat was described and illustrated by the English zoologist Philip Sclater in 1890 and given the binomial name Hypocnemis erythrura. It was subsequently placed in genus Myrmotherula. Based on genetic and vocal studies it and seven other members of that genus were moved to genus Epinecrophylla created in 2006. All were eventually named "stipplethroats" to highlight a common feature and to set them apart from Myrmotherula antwrens.

The rufous-tailed stipplethroat has two subspecies, the nominate E. e. erythrura (Sclater, PL, 1890) and E. e. septentrionalis (Zimmer, JT, 1932).

== Description ==
The rufous-tailed stipplethroat is 10 to 12 cm (3.9 to 4.7 in) long and weighs 9.5 to 12.5 g (0.34 to 0.44 oz). Males are the only members of the genus lacking a contrasting throat. Adult males of the nominate subspecies have a mostly gray face and a whitish throat with some black streaks. Their crown, neck, and upper back are olive-brown; their lower back, rump, and tail are rufous-chestnut. Their wings are brown; their wing coverts are blackish brown with pale buff or white tips. Their breast is gray and their belly and undertail coverts light olive-brown to buff-brown. Adult females have a gray face with a buff tinge. Their throat and breast are ochre and the rest of their underparts brown with an ochre tinge. Both sexes have a red or orange iris and a dark bill. Males of subspecies E. e. septentrionalis look the same as nominate males; females are more ochraceous on their face and underparts.

== Distribution and habitat ==
The rufous-tailed stipplethroat's nominate subspecies is found from southeastern Colombia south through eastern Ecuador into northeastern Peru to the Marañón and Amazon rivers and east into extreme northwestern Brazil. Subspecies E. e. septentrionalis is found in eastern Peru south of the Marañón and in west-central Brazil south of the Amazon. The species primarily inhabits terra firme evergreen forest in the lowlands and foothills, but also transitional forest and várzea. In elevation it occurs below 600 m (2,000 ft) in most of its range and locally up to 900 m (3,000 ft).

== Behavior ==
=== Movement ===
The rufous-tailed stipplethroat is believed to be a year-round resident throughout its range.

=== Feeding ===
The rufous-tailed stipplethroat feeds on arthropods, especially insects and spiders. It typically forages singly, in pairs, or in small family groups, and usually as part of a mixed-species feeding flock. It mostly forages in the forest understory to mid-storey between about 5 and 15 m (15 and 50 ft). It takes its prey almost entirely by gleaning from dead leaves on trees but also from dead leaves caught in vine tangles.

=== Territorial defense ===
Male rufous-tailed stipplethroats display to each other from perches less than 1 m (3 ft) apart; they puff up their back plumage, spread their wings and tail, sway back and forth, and continuously vocalize.

=== Breeding ===
Almost nothing is known about the rufous-tailed stipplethroat's breeding biology. Nest building has been observed in February. A different nest was a dome-shaped ball with a side entrance, made of dead leaves and placed in a dense shrub.

=== Vocalization ===
The rufous-tailed stipplethroat's song has been described as an "unmusical, extr. high, slightly descending 'seep-seep-seep-' " and as "a high-pitched 'swee, swee-swi-swi-seeseeseesr' ". Its call is "a short, high pitched, upslurred note, also a rattle".

== Status ==
The IUCN has assessed the rufous-tailed stipplethroat as being of Least Concern. It has a large range; its population size is not known but is believed to be stable. No immediate threats have been identified. It is considered fairly common in most of its range. It occurs in several protected areas and also in "extensive contiguous areas of intact habitat which, although not formally protected, appear to be at little risk of development in the near future".
