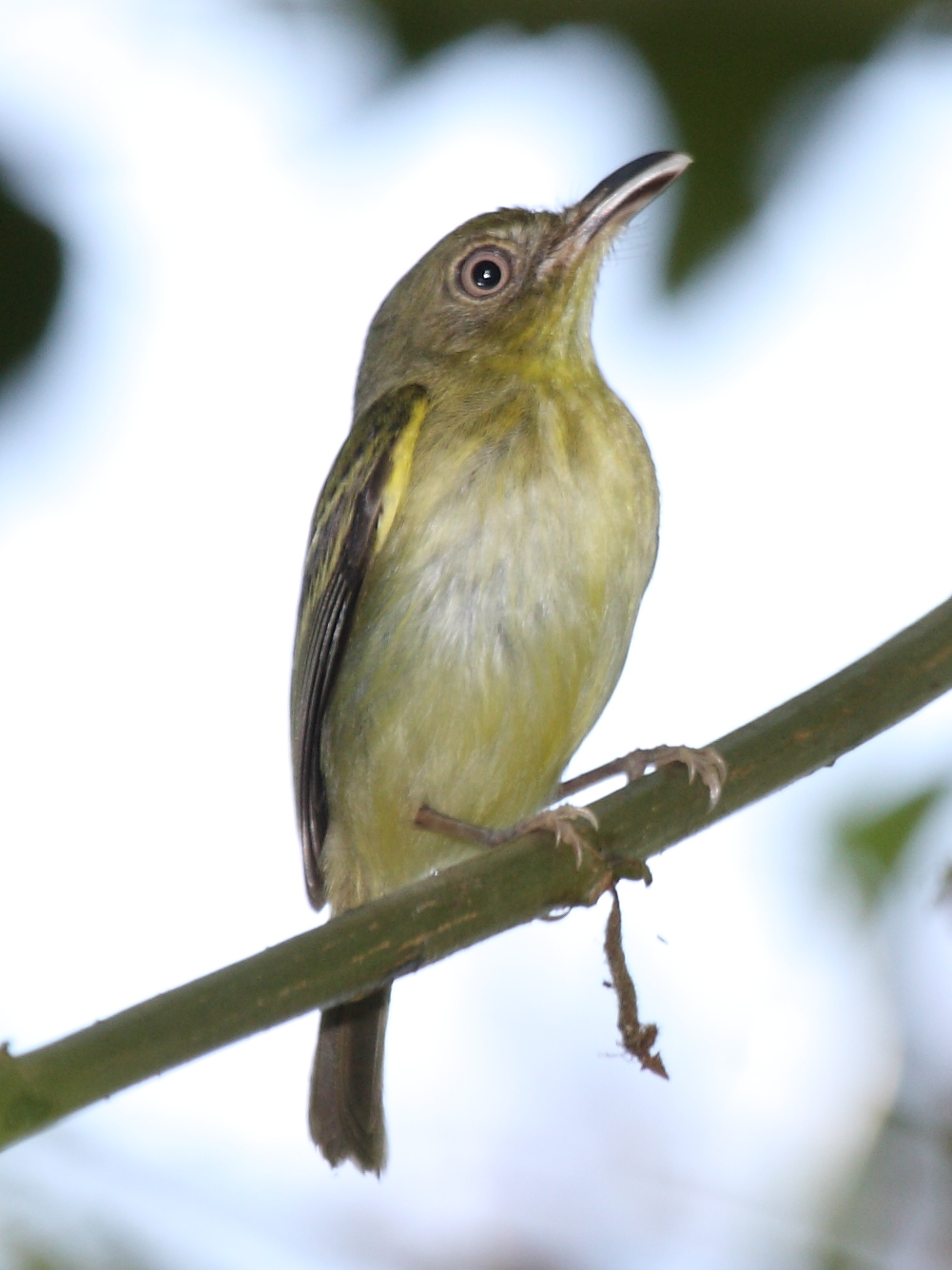
- Southern bentbill (Oncostoma olivaceum)

Scientific classification
- Kingdom: Animalia
- Phylum: Chordata
- Class: Aves
- Order: Passeriformes
- Family: Tyrannidae
- Genus: Oncostoma; P.L. Sclater, 1862

= Bentbill =

Genus of birds

The bentbills are found in the genus Oncostoma in the tyrant flycatcher family Tyrannidae. It contains the following two species:

Genus Oncostoma – P.L. Sclater, 1862 – two species
Common name	Scientific name and subspecies	Range	Size and ecology	IUCN status and estimated population
Northern bentbill	Oncostoma cinereigulare (Sclater, PL, 1857)	Belize, Colombia, Costa Rica, El Salvador, Guatemala, Honduras, Mexico, Nicaragua, and Panama	Size: Habitat: Diet:	LC
Southern bentbill	Oncostoma olivaceum (Lawrence, 1862)	Colombia and Panama	Size: Habitat: Diet:	LC
