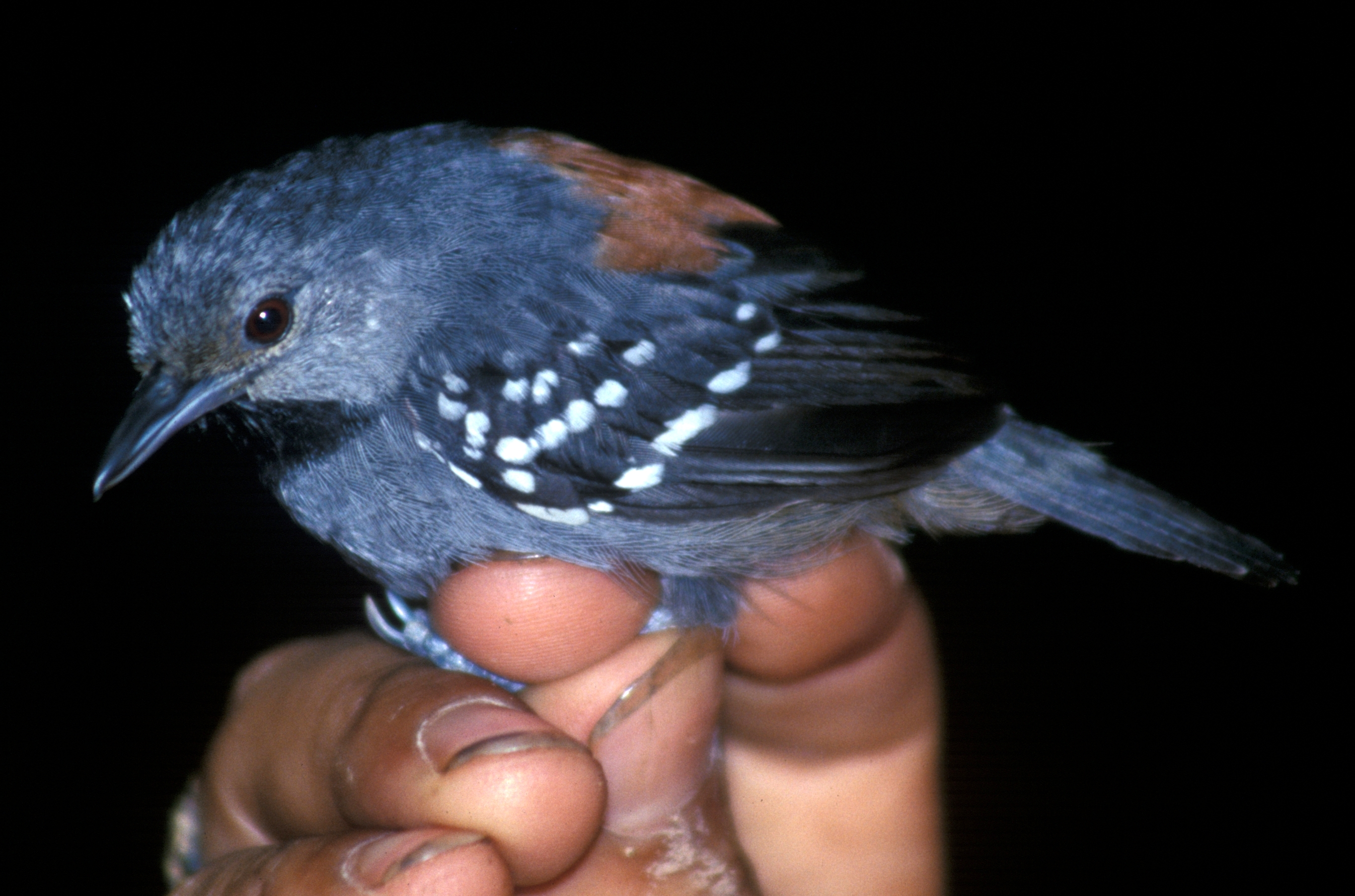
- Ornate stipplethroat (Epinecrophylla ornata)

Scientific classification
- Kingdom: Animalia
- Phylum: Chordata
- Class: Aves
- Order: Passeriformes
- Family: Thamnophilidae
- Genus: Epinecrophylla; Isler, ML & Brumfield, 2006

Type species
- Formicivora haematonota Sclater, 1857

= Stipplethroat =

Genus of birds

The stipplethroats are a genus Epinecrophylla of South and Central American passerine birds in the antbird family Thamnophilidae. They were previously included in the genus Myrmotherula as the "stipple-throated group".

== Taxonomy ==
The genus Epinecrophylla was erected in 2006 by the American ornithologists Morton Isler and Robb Brumfield with Formicivora haematonota Sclater, 1857, the rufous-backed stipplethroat, as the type species. The genus name combines the Ancient Greek επι/epi meaning "on" with νεκρος/nekros meaning "dead" and φυλλον/phullon meaning "leaf".

Molecular studies found that the genus Myrmotherula as then defined was polyphyletic. The stipple-throated members formed a clade that was not a sister clade to any of the remaining members, and the genus Epinecrophylla was erected to accommodate them. The stipple-throated species have a black and white (or buffy-white) stippled throat in one or both of the sexes. They also have a relatively long, plain-coloured tail. The fact that this clade is distinct from the remaining members of the Myrmotherula is reinforced by differences in song, foraging behaviour and nest-building.

== Ecology ==
Members of the genus Epinecrophylla tend to specialise in extracting insects and spiders from dangling clusters of dead leaves, foraging in this way for more than 75% of the time. While foraging they have stereotyped methods of manipulating the leaves with their beaks and feet; by contrast, members of Myrmotherula tend to hunt for prey on the surfaces of leaves, stems, twigs, mosses and vines, and none of those birds specialise in and manipulate dead leaves, although they do sometimes probe them with their beaks. Another characteristic of Epinecrophylla seems to be the dome-shaped nest with side or oblique entrance; three of the species have this characteristic, while the nesting behaviours of the other members of the genus are not known.

== Species ==
The genus contains eight species:

Image	Common name	Scientific name	Distribution
	Checker-throated stipplethroat	Epinecrophylla fulviventris	Central America and Tumbes–Chocó–Magdalena
	Brown-bellied stipplethroat	Epinecrophylla gutturalise	Guiana Shield
	White-eyed stipplethroat	Epinecrophylla leucophthalma	southern Amazonia
	Rufous-backed stipplethroat	Epinecrophylla haematonota	western Amazonia
	Rio Madeira stipplethroat	Epinecrophylla amazonica	south of the Madeira River
	Foothill stipplethroat	Epinecrophylla spodionota	northern Andes
	Ornate stipplethroat	Epinecrophylla ornata	western Amazonia
	Rufous-tailed stipplethroat	Epinecrophylla erythrura	western Amazonia
