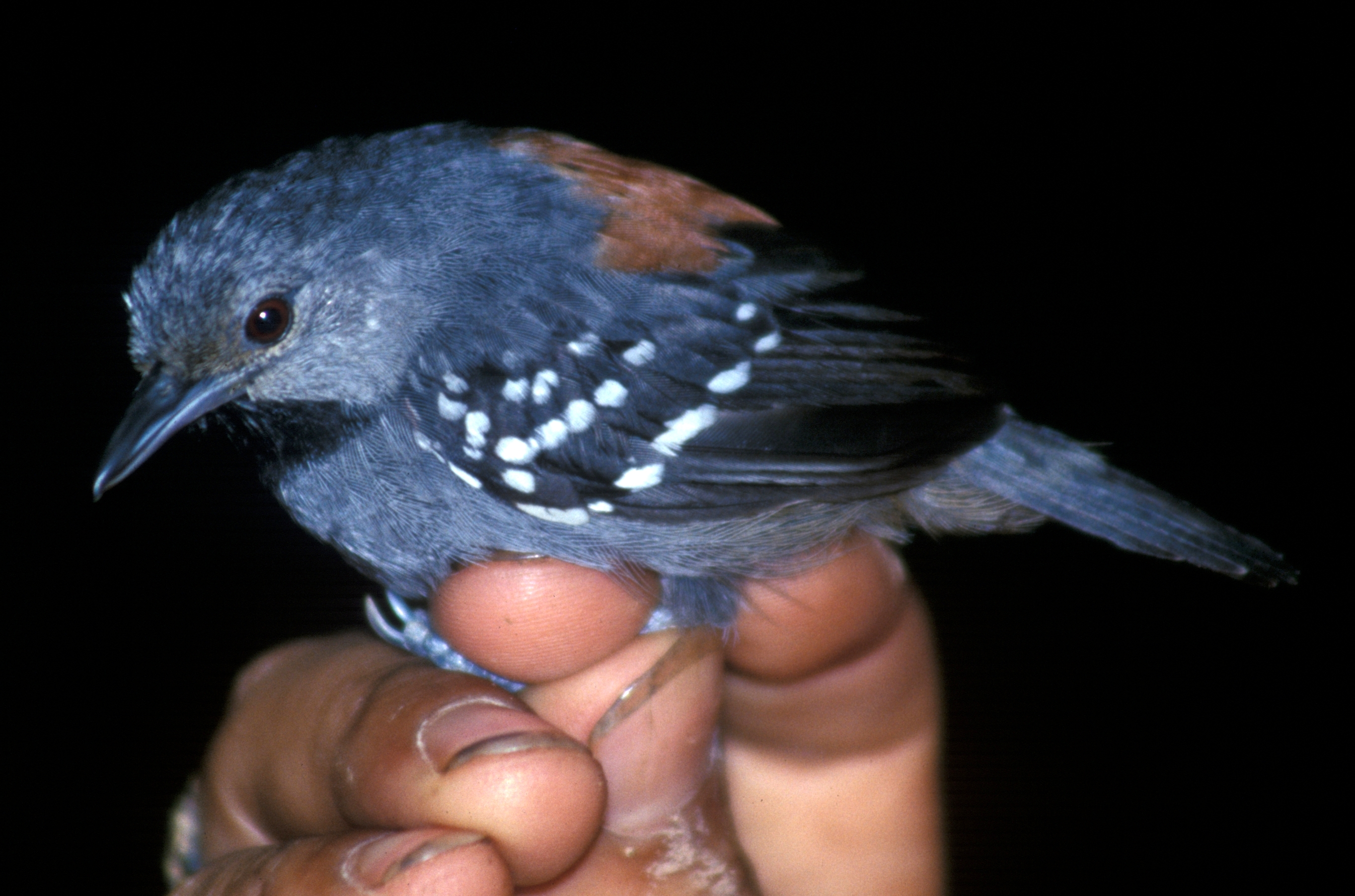
- Male from Cordillera del Cóndor, Ecuador

Conservation status
- Least Concern (IUCN 3.1)

- Least Concern (IUCN 3.1)

Scientific classification
- Kingdom: Animalia
- Phylum: Chordata
- Class: Aves
- Order: Passeriformes
- Family: Thamnophilidae
- Genus: Epinecrophylla
- Species: E. ornata

Binomial name
- Epinecrophylla ornata (Sclater, PL, 1853)

Subspecies
- See text

= Ornate stipplethroat =

Species of bird

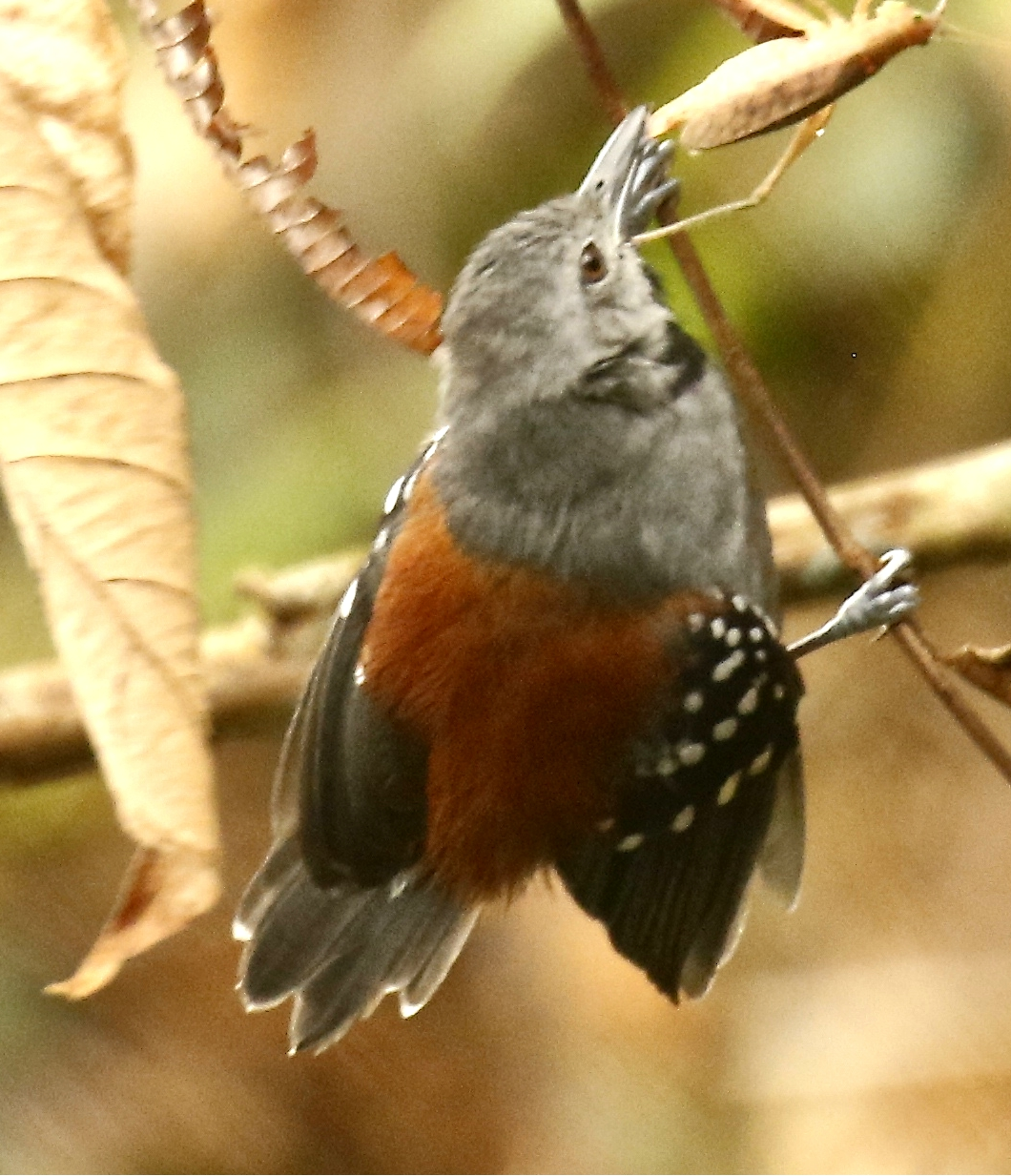
Wildsumaco Lodge - Ecuador

The ornate stipplethroat (Epinecrophylla ornata), formerly called the ornate antwren, is a species of bird in subfamily Thamnophilinae of family Thamnophilidae, the "typical antbirds". It is found in Bolivia, Brazil, Colombia, Ecuador, and Peru.

== Taxonomy and systematics ==
The ornate stipplethroat was described by the English zoologist Philip Sclater in 1853 and given the binomial name Formicivora ornata. It was subsequently placed in genus Myrmotherula. Based on genetic and vocal studies it and seven other members of that genus were moved to genus Epinecrophylla created in 2006. All were eventually named "stipplethroats" to highlight a common feature and to set them apart from Myrmotherula antwrens.

The International Ornithological Committee, the Clements taxonomy, and the South American Classification Committee of the American Ornithological Society recognize these five subspecies:

- E. o. ornata (Sclater, PL, 1853)
- E. o. saturata (Chapman, 1923)
- E. o. atrogularis (Taczanowski, 1874)
- E. o. meridionalis (Zimmer, JT, 1932)
- E. o. hoffmannsi (Hellmayr, 1906)

However, BirdLife International's Handbook of the Birds of the World (HBW) treats E. o. hoffmannsi as a species called the "eastern ornate stipplethroat". It calls E. o. ornata with its four subspecies the "western ornate stipplethroat".

This article follows the one species, five subspecies, model.

== Description ==
The ornate stipplethroat is 9 to 11 cm (3.5 to 4.3 in) long and weighs 8.5 to 11 g (0.30 to 0.39 oz). Adult males of the nominate subspecies E. o. ornata have a gray head, neck, and upper back. Their lower back and rump are rufous chestnut. Their tail is blackish gray with thin white edges to the feathers. Their wings are blackish gray with white tips on the coverts. They have a solid black throat. Their underparts are mostly pale gray with a brown tinge to the flanks and undertail coverts. Adult females have a mostly olive-tinged cinnamon face. Their crown, neck, and upper back are grayish olive-brown. Their throat is black with white streaks. Their underparts are olive-tinged cinnamon that is darker on the flanks and undertail coverts.

Males of subspecies E. o. saturata are darker and more richly colored than the nominate, and females are slightly darker. Males of subspecies E. o. atrogularis are like saturata males; females have grayer upperparts than saturata with no cinnamon on their underparts. Males of E. o. meridionalis have entirely gray upperparts (no rufous chestnut) and pale gray underparts. Females have gray to grayish olive-brown upperparts and cinnamon-rufous tinged buff underparts. Males of E. o. hoffmannsi have less extensive rufous chestnut on their upperparts than the nominate. Females' throats are the same olive-tinged cinnamon as their underparts. They also have less rufous chestnut on their upperparts than the nominate, and their wing coverts have buff spots instead of white.

== Distribution and habitat ==
The subspecies of the ornate stipplethroat are found thus:

- E. o. ornata: Colombia's Meta Department
- E. o. saturata: south-central Colombia south through eastern Ecuador into northeastern Peru to the Marañón River
- E. o. atrogularis: from east-central Peru between San Martín and Ayacucho departments east into the western parts of Brazil's Amazonas and Acre states
- E. o. meridionalis: southeastern Peru, northwestern Bolivia, and adjoining western Brazil
- E. o. hoffmannsi: Amazonian Brazil in Rondônia, Mato Grosso, and Tocantins states

The ornate stipplethroat primarily inhabits evergreen forest including terra firme, transitional forest, and várzea. In some areas it favors stands of Guadua bamboo and in others areas with many vine tangles. In elevation it reaches 1,500 m (4,900 ft) in Colombia but only 900 m (3,000 ft) in Brazil and 1,200 m (3,900 ft) in Ecuador.

== Behavior ==
=== Movement ===
The ornate stipplethroat is believed to be a year-round resident throughout its range.

=== Feeding ===
The ornate stipplethroat feeds on arthropods, especially insects and spiders. It typically forages singly, in pairs, or in small family groups, and usually as part of a mixed-species feeding flock. It mostly forages in the forest understory to mid-storey between about 4 and 9 m (13 and 30 ft) above the ground but occasionally as low as 1 m (3 ft) and as high as 20 m (65 ft). It takes its prey almost entirely by gleaning from dead leaves on trees but also from dead leaves caught in vine tangles and small palms.

=== Breeding ===
The ornate stipplethroat's breeding season has not been fully described, but spans from December to July in lowland Ecuador and includes July in Peru. A nest of subspecies E. o. hoffmannsi was an open cup of thin roots, dry leaves, and twigs suspended in a branch fork. One of E. o. atrogularis was dome-shaped with a side entrance, and made of dead leaves, rootlets, and moss. The latter nest contained two eggs. The incubation period, time to fledging, and details of parental care are not known.

=== Vocalization ===
The ornate stipplethroat's song varies with the subspecies. That of E. o. saturata is described as "a thin, high-pitched chipper that fades away, 'tsee-tsee-tsi-tsi-tsitsitsi' ". That of E. o. hoffmannsi is an "extr. hig, thin, rattling trill" whose frequency drops at the end. Those of meridionalis and atrogularis are similar to that of hoffmannsi but with less of a terminal frequency drop. The species' calls are less variable, and described as a " short emphatic pseet! or tsee!". E. o. hoffmannsi also makes a "grating 'zee-zee-zee-' ".

== Status ==
The IUCN follows HBW taxonomy and so has separately assessed the "western" and "eastern" ornate stipplethroats. Both have large ranges and unknown population sizes that are believed to be stable. No immediate threats to either have been identified. The species is considered fairly common but local in most of its range though scarce in Ecuador and uncommon in Colombia. It occurs in several large protected areas, and "vast contiguous areas of intact habitat within the regions occupied by this species appear to be at little near-term risk of development, although they are not formally protected".
