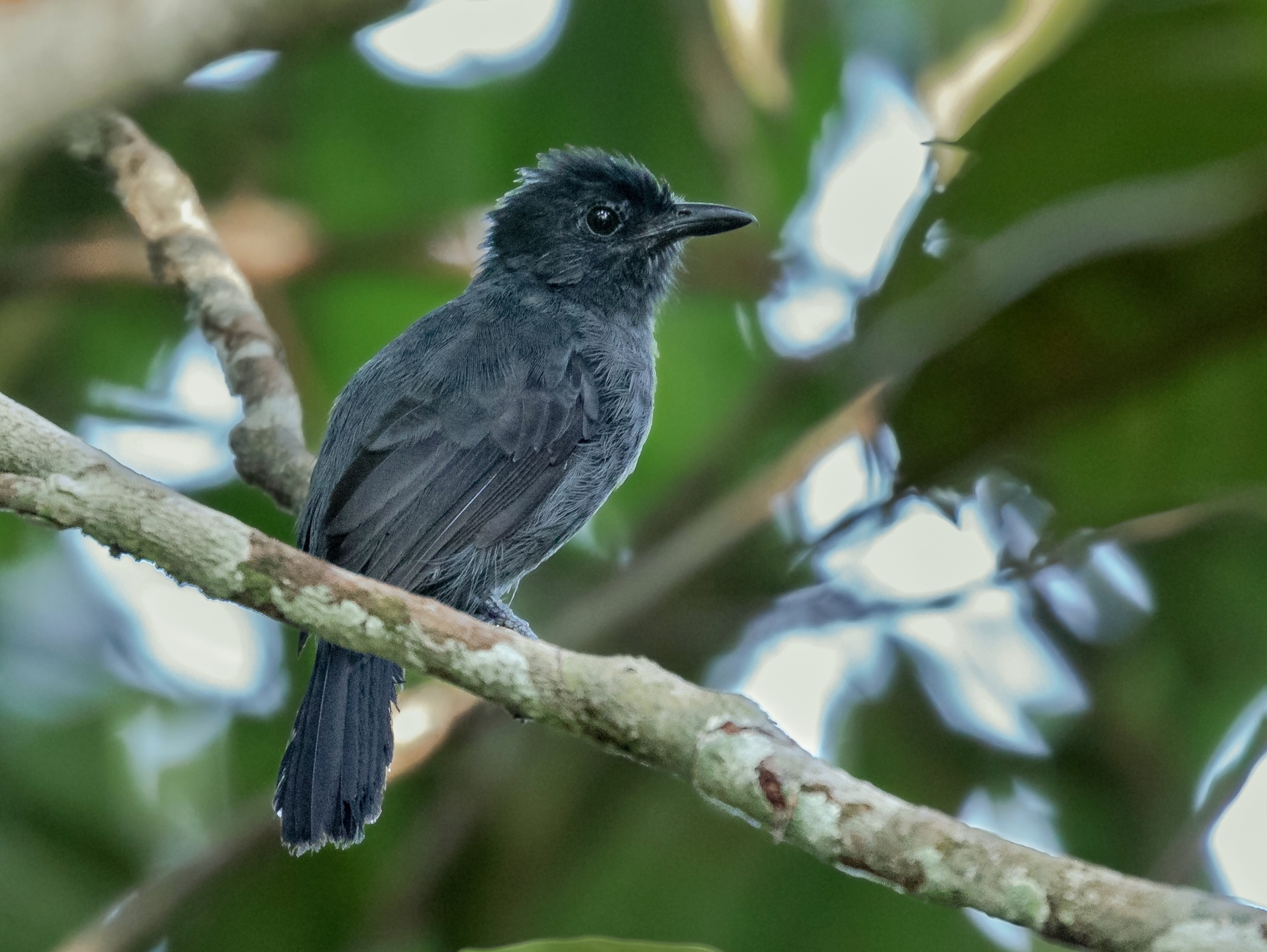

Conservation status
- Least Concern (IUCN 3.1)

Scientific classification
- Kingdom: Animalia
- Phylum: Chordata
- Class: Aves
- Order: Passeriformes
- Family: Thamnophilidae
- Genus: Thamnophilus
- Species: T. divisorius

Binomial name
- Thamnophilus divisorius Whitney, Oren & Brumfield, 2004

Audio
- Song

= Acre antshrike =

Species of bird

The Acre antshrike (Thamnophilus divisorius) is a species of bird in subfamily Thamnophilinae of family Thamnophilidae, the "typical antbirds". It is found in Brazil and Peru.

== Taxonomy and systematics ==
The Acre antshrike was discovered in 1996, in Serra do Divisor National Park, Acre, Brazil, and described as a species new to science in 2004. It is monotypic. It and the streak-backed antshrike (T. insignis) are sister species.

== Description ==
The Acre antshrike is about 16 cm (6.3 in) long and weighs about 22 g (0.78 oz). Members of genus Thamnophilus are largish members of the antbird family; all have stout bills with a hook like those of true shrikes. This species exhibits significant sexual dimorphism. Adult males have a glossy black crown and nape with a few white feathers on the forehead and nape; the rest of their head and neck are a less glossy black. Their back is mostly bluish black with dark bluish gray rump and uppertail coverts. Their wings, scapulars, and wing coverts are mostly black and their primaries blackish. Their tail is black; all feathers except the central pair have white tips. Their underparts are mostly dark bluish gray with a somewhat darker throat. Adult females have a dark bluish gray crown. Their face is dark bluish gray with orangish shafts on the ear coverts. Their upperparts are unmarked dark bluish gray. Their wings are blackish; their tail is blackish with small buff-orange tips on the outermost feathers. Their chin and throat are deep ochraceous with darker mottling and the rest of their underparts are deep ochraceous or brownish orange. Both sexes have a chestnut brown iris and dull bluish gray legs and feet. Their maxilla is black or dark gray and their mandible black or dark gray with sometimes a pale horn base.

== Distribution and habitat ==
The Acre antshrike was originally known to occur only in the immediate area of its discovery, the Sierra da Jaquiran in Brazil's Serra do Divisor National Park, though the discovery team expected it to also occur on other ridges with similar habitat in and near the park. Its range was extended by nearly 100 km (60 mi) with the 2006 discovery of the species in Peru's Ojo de Contaya and Diviso in Zona Reservada Sierra del Divisor, which is part of the same complex of ridges as the discovery site. In both known locations it occurs in areas of nutrient-poor sandy soil with forest generally shorter than 15 m (50 ft), and within the narrow elevational range of about 400 to 600 m (1,300 to 2,000 ft). Most of the few encounter sites on the two ridges had a dense understory dominated by terrestrial bromeliads.

== Behavior ==
=== Movement ===
The Acre antshrike is presumed to be a year-round resident throughout its range.

=== Feeding ===
Little is known about the Acre antshrike's diet or feeding behavior. Whitney et al. observed pairs foraging low to the ground, hopping and hitching on thin branches and vines. They captured prey by reaching and lunging from a perch; all of the identified prey were arthropods. It was not observed joining mixed-species feeding flocks, which were however scarce in its habitat.

=== Breeding ===
Nothing is known about the Acre antshrike's breeding biology.

=== Vocalization ===
The Acre antshrike's song is "an accelerating, descending series of rich notes with a distinctive, higher pitched, bisyllabic terminal bark: kuk kuk-kuk-kuk-ku-ku-ku-ku'wah'AH". Its calls include a "cawed aw and a longer, descending awwr". Whitney et al. noted specific differences between this species' song and those of other Thanomphilus antshrikes. They also noted that the female's song is at a slightly lower pitch than the male's.

== Status ==
The IUCN has assessed the Acre antshrike as being of Least Concern. It has a restricted range and an unknown population size; the latter is believed to be stable. No immediate threats have been identified. It is considered fairly common to common within its range, though difficult to find other than by ear. "Human activity has little direct effect on the Acre Antshrike."
