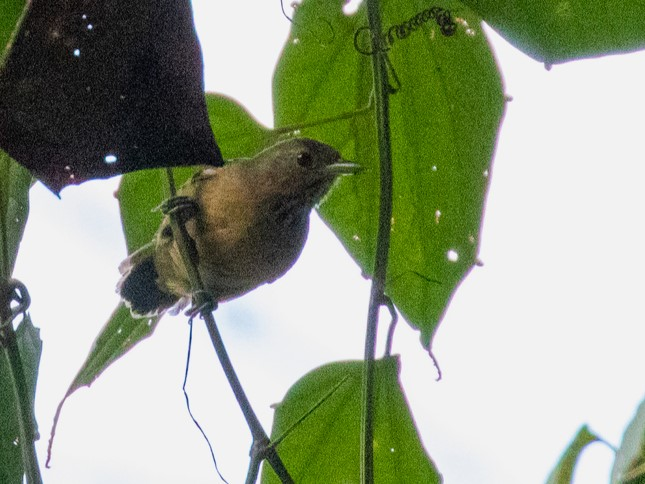

Conservation status
- Least Concern (IUCN 3.1)

Scientific classification
- Kingdom: Animalia
- Phylum: Chordata
- Class: Aves
- Order: Passeriformes
- Family: Thamnophilidae
- Genus: Epinecrophylla
- Species: E. spodionota

Binomial name
- Epinecrophylla spodionota (Sclater, PL & Salvin, 1880)

Subspecies
- See text

Synonyms
- Myrmotherula spodionota

= Foothill stipplethroat =

Species of bird

The foothill stipplethroat (Epinecrophylla spodionota), previously called the foothill antwren, is a species of bird in subfamily Thamnophilinae of family Thamnophilidae, the "typical antbirds". It is found in Colombia, Ecuador, and Peru.

== Taxonomy and systematics ==
The foothill stipplethroat was described by the English ornithologists Philip Sclater and Osbert Salvin in 1880 and given the binomial name Myrmotherula spodionota. Based on genetic and vocal studies it and seven other members of that genus were moved to the newly created genus Epinecrophylla. All were eventually named "stipplethroats" to highlight a common feature and to set them apart from Myrmotherula antwrens.

The foothill stipplethroat has two subspecies, the nominate E. s. spodionota (Sclater & Salvin, 1880) and E. s. sororia (von Berlepsch & Stolzmann, 1894).

== Description ==
The foothill stipplethroat is 10 to 11 cm (3.9 to 4.3 in) long and weighs 9 to 10.5 g (0.32 to 0.37 oz). Adult males of the nominate subspecies have a mostly gray face and a black throat with white spots. They have a brown-tinged dark gray crown and back, a dark reddish yellow-brown rump, and a dark brown tail and flight feathers. Their wing coverts are blackish brown with pale buff or white tips. Their breast and upper belly are gray and their lower belly, flanks, and undertail coverts reddish yellow-brown. Adult females have a mostly yellow-ochre face, throat, and underparts; the throat has some darker mottling. Their upperparts are olive-brown with a buff tinge on the rump. Their wings and flight feathers are brown and their wing coverts brown with pinkish buff tips. Males of subspecies E. s. sororia have more olive upperparts than the nominate, with less reddish rump, flanks, and undertail coverts. Females have paler underparts than the nominate.

== Distribution and habitat ==
The nominate subspecies of the foothill stipplethroat is found on the east side of the Andes from southern Colombia south through Ecuador into northern Peru to the Marañón River. Subspecies E. s. sororia is found in Peru south of the Marañón as far as the Department of Madre de Dios. The species inhabits the understorey of foothill and lower montane evergreen forest. In Colombia it occurs between 600 and 1,400 m (2,000 and 4,600 ft), in Ecuador between 600 and 1,425 m (2,000 and 4,700 ft), and in Peru as low as 500 m (1,600 ft).

== Behavior ==
=== Movement ===
The foothill stipplethroat is believed to be a year-round resident throughout its range.

=== Feeding ===
The foothill stipplethroat feeds on arthropods, especially insects and probably spiders. It typically forages singly, in pairs, or in small family groups, and usually as part of a mixed-species feeding flock. It mostly forages in the forest understory up to about 4 m (10 ft) above the ground but occasionally as high as 8 m (25 ft). It takes its prey almost entirely by gleaning from dead leaves on trees and caught in vine tangles and small palms. It much less frequently feeds from mosses, bark, and live leaves.

=== Breeding ===
The foothill stipplethroat's breeding season has not been defined but includes March. Nothing else is known about its breeding biology.

=== Vocalization ===
The foothill stipplethroat's song is "a trill of abrupt, sibilant notes first ascending sharply and then gradually dropping in pitch". Its calls include a "short, high-pitched rattle".

== Status ==
The IUCN has assessed the foothill stipplethroat as being of Least Concern. It has a very large range; its population size is not known and is believed to be decreasing. No immediate threats have been identified. It is considered uncommon to fairly common throughout its range. Though it occurs in some protected areas, "the lower Andean slopes to which this species is restricted are some of the areas most at risk of deforestation and cultivation by an ever-expanding human population".
