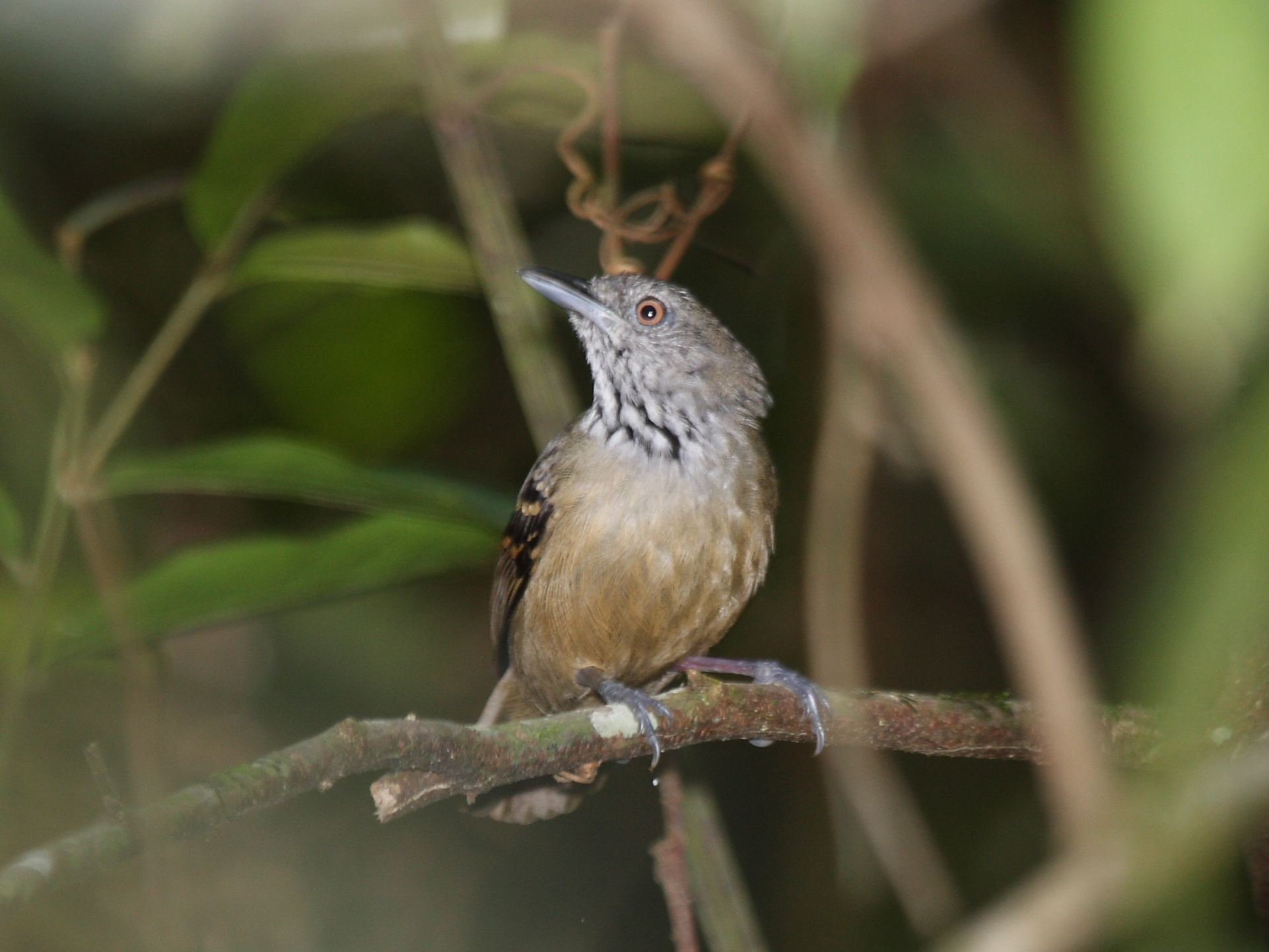

Conservation status
- Least Concern (IUCN 3.1)

Scientific classification
- Kingdom: Animalia
- Phylum: Chordata
- Class: Aves
- Order: Passeriformes
- Family: Thamnophilidae
- Genus: Epinecrophylla
- Species: E. fulviventris

Binomial name
- Epinecrophylla fulviventris (Lawrence, 1862)

Synonyms
- Myrmotherula fulviventris

= Checker-throated stipplethroat =

Species of bird

The checker-throated stipplethroat (Epinecrophylla fulviventris), previously called fulvous-bellied antwren or checker-throated antwren, is a small passerine bird in subfamily Thamnophilinae of family Thamnophilidae, the "typical antbirds". It is found from Honduras to Ecuador.

== Taxonomy and systematics ==
The checker-throated stipplethroat was originally placed in genus Myrmotherula and then given the English name checker-throated antwren. Based on genetic and vocal studies it and seven other members of the genus were moved to the newly created genus Epinecrophylla. All were eventually named "stipplethroats" to highlight a common feature and to set them apart from Myrmotherulaantwrens. Though three subspecies have been proposed, that treatment has not gained acceptance and major taxonomic systems deem the species monotypic.

== Description ==
The checker-throated stipplethroat is 10 to 11 cm (3.9 to 4.3 in) long and weighs 8.5 to 11.5 g (0.30 to 0.41 oz). The sexes have nearly identical plumage. Males have a mostly gray face and a black throat with large white spots. Females have a mostly brownish buff face and throat. Adults of both sexes have a gray-brown crown and upperparts and a reddish tail. Their wing coverts are blackish brown to olive-brown with yellow-ochre tips and their flight feathers are reddish. Their breast is gray and the rest of their underparts are brownish buff that is darker towards the vent area. Their iris is golden that darkens with age. Juveniles have a gray iris that yellows as they mature.

== Distribution and habitat ==
The checker-throated stipplethroat is found on the Caribbean slope from far southeastern Honduras through Nicaragua and Costa Rica into western Panama, on both the Caribbean and Pacific slopes from western Panama into Colombia, east in Colombia into the Magdalena River valley, and south through western Colombia and Ecuador nearly to Peru. It inhabits evergreen forest in the lowlands and foothills and adjacent mature secondary forest. It favors areas with dense vine tangles that collect debris. In elevation it mostly ranges up to about 750 m (2,500 ft) in Central America, to 1,200 m (3,900 ft) in Colombia, and to 900 m (3,000 ft) in Ecuador. It does reach 900 m (3,000 ft) in Costa Rica and 2,000 m (6,600 ft) in Colombia.

== Behavior ==
=== Movement ===
The checker-throated stipplethroat is a year-round resident throughout its range.

=== Feeding ===
The checker-throated stipplethroat feeds on arthropods, especially cockroaches (Blattidae), crickets (Gryllidae), katydids (Tettigoniidae), and spiders. It typically forages in pairs or in small family groups and less often by itself, and usually as part of a mixed-species feeding flock. It occasionally, and for short periods, attends army ant swarms. It mostly forages in the forest understory to mid-story; some studies found that it seldom exceeds 10 m (30 ft) above the ground, but others have noted it feeding as high as 25 m (80 ft). It forages mostly in vine tangles, on their foliage and in dead leaves and other debris trapped in them. It also forages by hitching along thin branches and capturing prey from their live leaves, in clumps of moss, and from epiphytes.

=== Territorial defense ===
Male checker-throated stipplethroats display to each other from perches about 30 cm (12 in) apart; they lower their heads, puff up their plumage, sway back and forth, and continuously vocalize.

=== Breeding ===
The checker-throated stipplethroat's breeding season varies somewhat in different areas. In Panama it appears to nest at any time but mostly in the rainy season. In Costa Rica it nests between March and August; in Colombia its season includes December but is not otherwise defined. Its nest is a deep pouch of plant fibers, fungal filaments, rootlets, and dead leaves with a lining of fine fibers. It is suspended from the last fork of a thin twig, usually below 2 m (7 ft) in a sapling but occasionally as high as 8 m (25 ft). The clutch size is two eggs; they have a white or cream base color with blotches, fine spots, and scrawls of reddish-brown, purplish-chestnut, and pale lilac. Both parents incubate the clutch during the day and the female alone at night. The incubation period is 18 to 20 days. Both parents provision nestlings; the time to fledging is not known.

=== Vocalization ===
The checker-throated stipplethroat's song is a "series of abrupt, countable, almost stacatto notes...variable in pace, pitch and intensity, but often accelerates and intensifies initially and decelerates and dies off slightly at end. It has been further described as "a descending series of high-pitched notes, 'seee, seee, seeu, seeu' ". Its calls include "a fast rattle and a 'peeyk' note".

== Status ==
The IUCN has assessed the checker-throated stipplethroat as being of Least Concern. It has a large range; its population size is not known and is thought to be decreasing. No immediate threats have been identified. It is considered fairly common across its range and occurs in several protect areas. "Continued protection of the forests in these and other existing reserves should ensure the maintenance of viable populations of this species."
