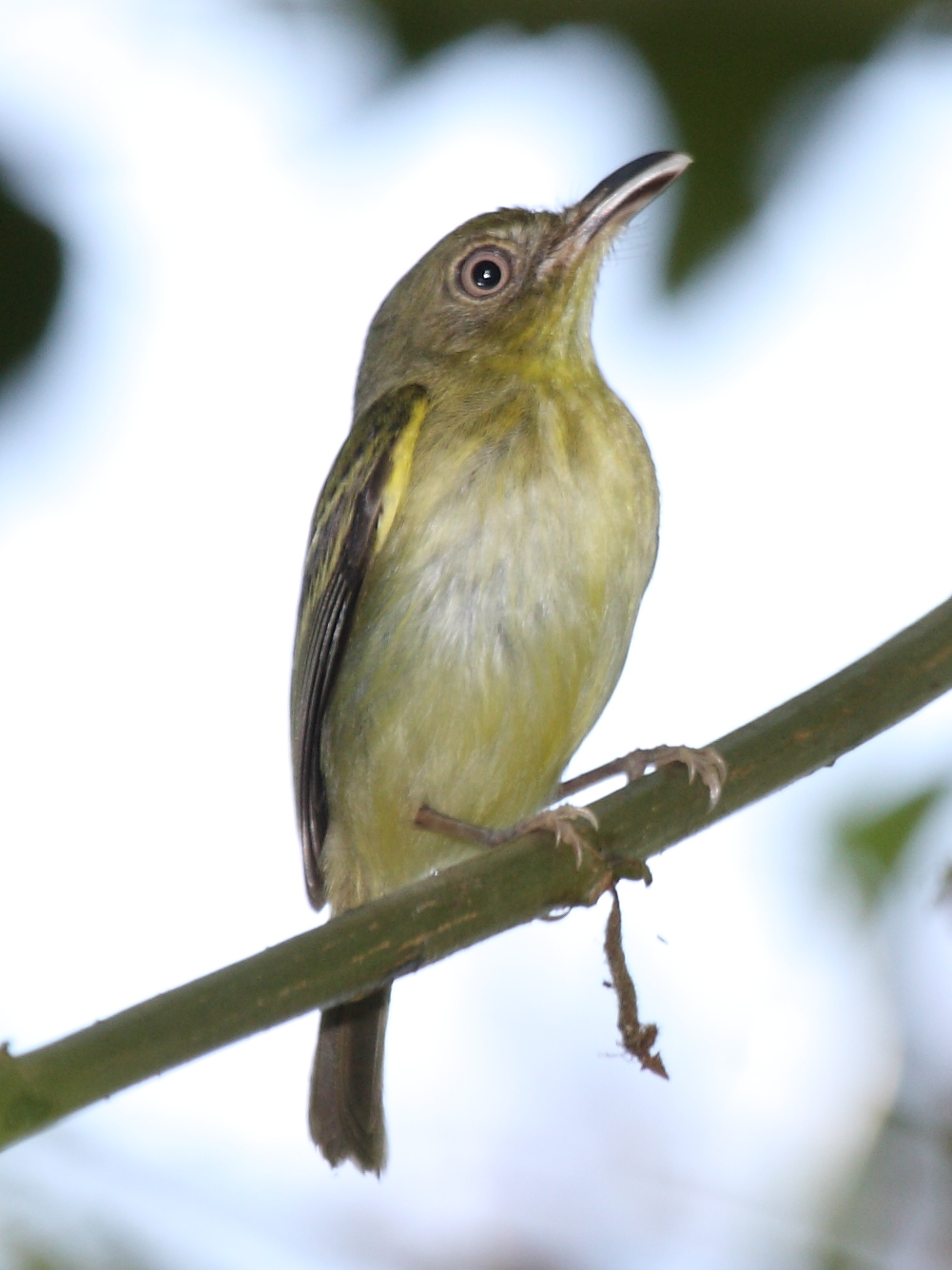

Conservation status
- Least Concern (IUCN 3.1)

Scientific classification
- Kingdom: Animalia
- Phylum: Chordata
- Class: Aves
- Order: Passeriformes
- Family: Tyrannidae
- Genus: Oncostoma
- Species: O. olivaceum

Binomial name
- Oncostoma olivaceum (Lawrence, 1862)

= Southern bentbill =

Species of bird

The southern bentbill (Oncostoma olivaceum) is a species of bird in the family Tyrannidae, the tyrant flycatchers. It is found in Colombia and Panama.

== Taxonomy and systematics ==
The southern bentbill was originally described in 1862 as Todirostrum olivaceum. It was later moved to genus Oncostoma that Philip Sclater had created that same year.

The southern bentbill is monotypic. It shares genus Oncostoma with the northern bentbill (O. cinereigulare); in the early twentieth century at least one author considered them to be conspecific. The two form a superspecies.

== Description ==
The southern bentbill is about 9 cm (3.5 in) long and weighs about 6 to 7 g (0.21 to 0.25 oz). It has a distinctive fairly thick downcurved bill. The sexes have the same plumage. Adults have a mostly olive head with a whitish area above the lores. Their back, rump, and uppertail coverts are olive. Their wings are dusky with lemon yellow edges on the flight feathers and greenish yellow tips on the coverts; the latter show as two indistinct wing bars. Their tail is dusky olive. Their throat and breast are yellowish white with olive streaks, their belly yellow, and their flanks olive-yellow with some olive streaks. They have a pale yellow to dusky iris, a gray bill, and dusky pinkish legs and feet.

== Distribution and habitat ==
The southern bentbill is found in central and eastern Panama from western Colón Province on the Caribbean side and the Canal Zone on the Pacific side. Its range continues into northern Colombia east most of the way to the Venezuelan border and south to Chocó and Cundinamarca departments. It inhabits the interior and edges of humid lowland evergreen forest, secondary woodlands, and shrubby clearings the tropical zone. In all landscapes it favors thickets and dense undergrowth. In elevation it ranges from sea level to 1,300 m (4,300 ft).

== Behavior ==
=== Movement ===
The southern bentbill is a year-round resident.

=== Feeding ===
The southern bentbill feeds primarily on arthropods and occasionally on small berries. It typically forages singly or in pairs and is not known to join mixed-species feeding flocks. It forages in dense vegetation, often near the ground but also up to the forest sub-canopy. It takes prey mostly by using short upward sallies from a perch to grab it from leaves; it then typically flies to a new perch.

=== Breeding ===
The southern bentbill's breeding season has not been defined. It apparently spans at least February to June in Colombia, and single nests have been observed in April and August in Panama. Its nest is a flask or pear shaped ball with a side entrance made from plant fibers and lined with seed down; sometimes fibers dangle from the bottom. It is typically suspended from a thin branch; nests have been noted between about 1 and 4 m (3 and 13 ft) above the ground. The clutch is two eggs and the female alone is believed to incubate. Six nests had an average incubation period of about 19 days.

=== Vocalization ===
The southern bentbill's call is a "[g]uttural insect-like or toad-like trill, 'grrrrrrr' " that sometimes begins with a short note yielding "pt-trrrrrrrr". Another author says that a "[s]oft mechanical errreet [is] heard often".

== Status ==
The IUCN has assessed the southern bentbill as being of Least Concern. It has a large range; its estimated population of at least 500,000 mature individuals is believed to be decreasing. No immediate threats have been identified. It is considered fairly common in Panama and common in Colombia, and occurs in at least one Colombian national park.
