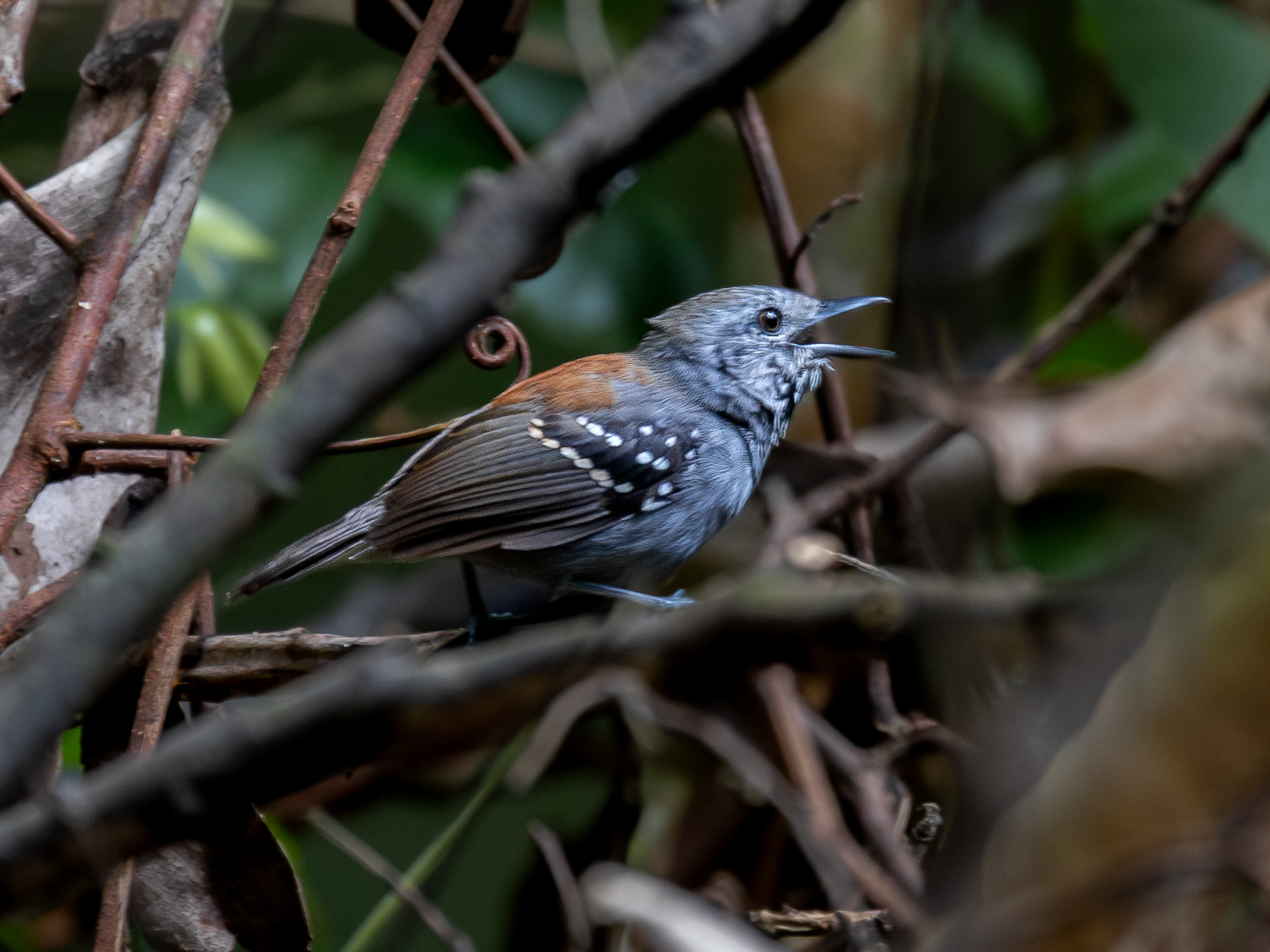
- male

Conservation status
- Least Concern (IUCN 3.1)

Scientific classification
- Kingdom: Animalia
- Phylum: Chordata
- Class: Aves
- Order: Passeriformes
- Family: Thamnophilidae
- Genus: Epinecrophylla
- Species: E. haematonota

Binomial name
- Epinecrophylla haematonota (Sclater, PL, 1857)

= Rufous-backed stipplethroat =

Stipple-throated antwren

Species of bird

The rufous-backed stipplethroat (Epinecrophylla haematonota) is a species of bird in subfamily Thamnophilinae of family Thamnophilidae, the "typical antbirds". It is found in Brazil, Colombia, Ecuador, Peru, and Venezuela. In its complex taxonomic history, Epinecrophylla haematonota has also been called the rufous-backed antwren, stipple-throated antwren, Napo stipple-throated antwren, and western stipple-throated antwren.

== Taxonomy and systematics ==
The rufous-backed stipplethroat was described by the English zoologist Philip Sclater in 1857 and given the binomial name Formicivora haematonota. It was later placed in genus Myrmotherula . Based on genetic and vocal studies it and seven other members of that genus were moved to the newly created genus Epinecrophylla. All were eventually named "stipplethroats" to highlight a common feature and to set them apart from Myrmotherula antwrens.

Since 2019 taxonomists have recognized these three subspecies within Epinecrophylla haematonota:

- E. h. haematonota (Sclater, PL, 1857)
- E. h. pyrrhonota (Sclater, PL & Salvin, 1873)
- E. h. fjeldsaai (Krabbe, Isler, ML, Isler, PR, Whitney, Álvarez A, J & Greenfield, 1999)

For a time previously each of these had been treated as separate species, the rufous-backed (or Napo stipple-throated) antwren (E. haematonota), Negro stipple-throated antwren (E. pyrrhonota), and Yasuni antwren (E. fjeldsaai). The three were returned ("lumped") to subspecies status following results of a study of their vocalizations.

== Description ==
The rufous-backed stipplethroat is 10 to 11 cm (3.9 to 4.3 in) long and weighs 8 to 10.5 g (0.28 to 0.37 oz). Adult males of the nominate subspecies E. h. haematonota have a mostly light gray face and a black throat with white spots. They have a grayish olive-brown crown and mantle, and deep rufous back, tail, and flight feathers. Their wing coverts are blackish brown with pale buff or white tips. Their breast and upper belly are light gray and their lower belly, flanks, and undertail coverts yellow-brown. Adult females have a mostly light yellowish olive-brown face and underparts. The tips of their wing coverts are pinkish buff. Their throat is white to pale buff, usually with dark feather bases visible, and sometimes with black streaks. Males of subspecies E. h. pyrrhonota have brighter rufous uppersides than the nominate. Females have a yellow-ochre face and throat; the latter is unmarked. Their breast and belly are reddish yellow-brown to reddish-tinged buff, and their flanks and undertail coverts are olive-brown. Males of subspecies E. h. fjeldsaai have an olive-brown crown, dark yellowish brown upperparts, and rufous-tinged flight feathers and tail that are darker than the nominate's. Females have an ochraceous face, a dark-streaked mostly white chin and throat, and buffy brown underparts.

== Distribution and habitat ==
The nominate subspecies E. h. haematonota of the rufous-backed stipplethroat is found in eastern Peru south of the Napo and Amazon rivers between the departments of Loreto and Madre de Dios and in the adjacent Brazilian states of Amazonas and Acre. Subspecies E. h. pyrrhonota is found in southeastern Colombia, southern Venezuela, extreme northeastern Ecuador, northeastern Peru north of the Napo and Amazon, and the northwestern Brazilian states of Amazonas and Roraima. Subspecies E. h. fjeldsaai is found in southeastern Ecuador south of the Napo and adjoining extreme north-central Peru.

The rufous-backed stipplethroat primarily inhabits terra firme evergreen forest. Subspecies E. h. fjeldsaai is also found in transitional forest and in lesser numbers in várzea forest. In elevation it mostly occurs below 500 m (1,600 ft) but reaches 1,300 m (4,300 ft) in Venezuela and northern Brazil and 1,100 m (3,600 ft) in Colombia. In Ecuador it reaches only 250 m (800 ft).

== Behavior ==
=== Movement ===
The rufous-backed stipplethroat is believed to be a year-round resident throughout its range.

=== Feeding ===
The rufous-backed stipplethroat feeds on arthropods, especially insects and spiders. It typically forages singly, in pairs, or in small family groups, and usually as part of a mixed-species feeding flock. It mostly forages in the forest understory up to about 3 m (10 ft) above the ground but occasionally as high as 9 m (30 ft) or beyond. It takes its prey almost entirely by gleaning from dead leaves on trees but also from dead leaves caught in vine tangles and small palms.

=== Breeding ===
The rufous-backed stipplethroat's breeding season has not been fully defined but appears to span at least March to July. One nest was a roofed cup resembling a globe woven from large and small leaves and rootlets and lined with strips of leaves. It was suspended between two palm fronds about 1 m (3 ft) above the ground. It contained two eggs and the male was seen incubating them. Nothing else is known about the species' breeding biology.

=== Vocalization ===
The rufous-backed stipplethroat's song is an "extr. high, very thin, descending, rapid shiver 'tsititi---' " that lasts two or three seconds. Its calls include a "doublet of abrupt notes, second higher-pitched", an "abrupt single note", and a "high-pitched rattle".

== Status ==
The IUCN has assessed the rufous-backed stipplethroat as being of Least Concern. It has a very large range; its population size is not known but is believed to be stable. No immediate threats have been identified. The species is considered uncommon to fairly common throughout its range though scarce and local in Ecuador. It occurs in several large protected areas and elsewhere occurs in "large, contiguous expanses of intact habitat which, although not formally protected, appear to be at minimal risk of development in the near term".
