= List of birds of Colombia =

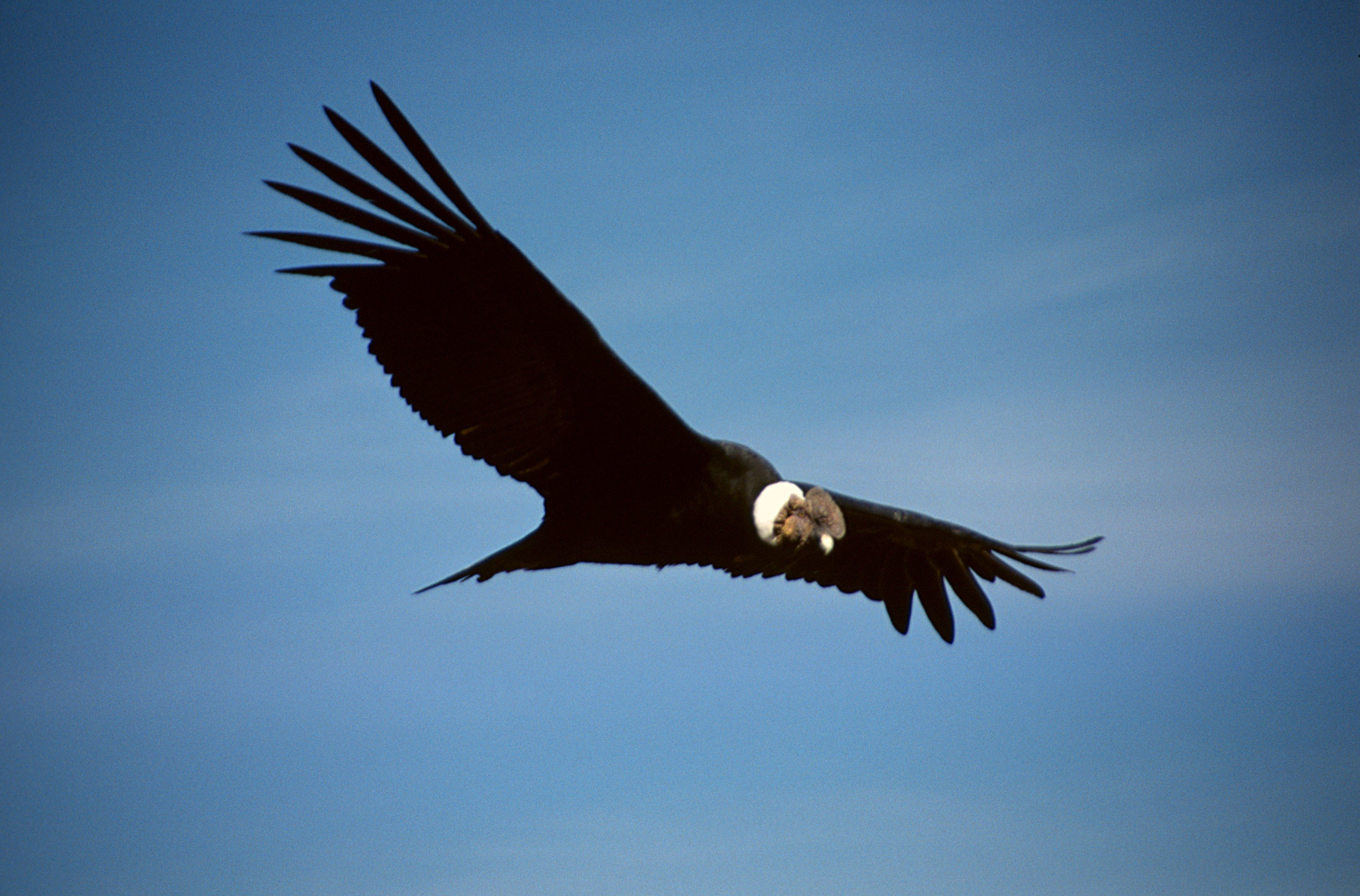
The Andean condor is the national bird of Colombia.

This is a list of the bird species recorded in Colombia. According to the South American Classification Committee (SACC), the avifauna of Colombia has 1915 confirmed species. Of them, 86 are endemic, four have been introduced by humans, and 78 are rare or vagrants. One of the endemic species is believed to be extinct. An additional 39 species are unconfirmed (see below).

The Colombian department of San Andrés and Providencia is much closer to Nicaragua than to the South American mainland, so the SACC does not address records there. A 2015 publication adds 16 species whose only Colombian records are from that province and also five species to the mainland list. It also does not include one species that the SACC recognizes. Three of the 16 are also considered hypothetical. A 2020 publication adds two more species (one offshore vagrant and a vagrant to the mainland). (The SACC does not address records from more than 200 miles offshore.)

Unless noted otherwise, the list's taxonomic treatment (designation and sequence of orders, families, and species) and nomenclature (common and scientific names) are those of the SACC. Capitalization within English names follows Wikipedia practice, i.e. only the first word of a name is capitalized unless a place name such as São Paulo is used.

The total number of species presented here is 2040. Of them, 89 are endemic, 138 are vagrants, and one species is of uncertain origin. Included are 56 species listed in a 1959 publication; none of them have been confirmed by the SACC since then. Six species listed in GBIF are included; they also are unconfirmed by the SACC.

The following tags have been used to highlight several categories of occurrence.

- (V) Vagrant - a species that rarely or accidentally occurs in Colombia
- (E) Endemic - a species endemic to Colombia
- (I) Introduced - a species introduced to Colombia as a consequence, direct or indirect, of human actions
- (U) Unconfirmed - a species recorded but with "no tangible evidence" according to the SACC
- (SA) San Andrés - a species whose only Colombian records are from the department of San Andrés and Providencia
- (UN) Unconfirmed - a species from a source other than the SACC or the cited 2015 and 2020 publications and unconfirmed by the SACC

Population status symbols are those of the Red List published by the International Union for Conservation of Nature (IUCN). The symbols apply to the species' worldwide status, not their status solely in Colombia. The symbols and their meanings, in increasing order of peril, are:

Conservation status codes
LC = least concern	NT = near threatened	VU = vulnerable
EN = endangered	CR = critically endangered	EW = extinct in the wild
EX = extinct		

== Tinamous ==
Order: Tinamiformes Family: Tinamidae

The tinamous are one of the most ancient groups of bird. Although they look similar to other ground-dwelling birds like quail and grouse, they have no close relatives and are classified as a single family, Tinamidae, within their own order, the Tinamiformes. Nineteen species have been recorded in Colombia.

- Tawny-breasted tinamou, Nothocercus julius (Bonaparte, 1854)
- Highland tinamou, Nothocercus bonapartei (Gray, GR, 1867)
- Gray tinamou, Tinamus tao Temminck, 1815 VU
- Black tinamou, Tinamus osgoodi Conover, 1949 VU
- Great tinamou, Tinamus major (Gmelin, JF, 1789)
- White-throated tinamou, Tinamus guttatus Pelzeln, 1863 NT
- Berlepsch's tinamou, Crypturellus berlepschi (Rothschild, 1897)
- Cinereous tinamou, Crypturellus cinereus (Gmelin, JF, 1789)
- Little tinamou, Crypturellus soui (Hermann, 1783)
- Brown tinamou, Crypturellus obsoletus (Temminck, 1815)
- Undulated tinamou, Crypturellus undulatus (Temminck, 1815)
- Gray-legged tinamou, Crypturellus duidae Zimmer, JT, 1938
- Red-legged tinamou, Crypturellus erythropus (Pelzeln, 1863)
- Choco tinamou, Crypturellus kerriae (Chapman, 1915) NT
- Variegated tinamou, Crypturellus variegatus (Gmelin, JF, 1789)
- Rusty tinamou, Crypturellus brevirostris (Pelzeln, 1863) (U)
- Bartlett's tinamou, Crypturellus bartletti (Sclater, PL & Salvin, 1873) (U)
- Barred tinamou, Crypturellus casiquiare (Chapman, 1929)
- Curve-billed tinamou, Nothoprocta curvirostris (Sclater, PL & Salvin, 1873)

== Screamers ==
Order: Anseriformes Family: Anhimidae

The screamers are a small family of birds related to the ducks. They are large, bulky birds, with a small downy head, long legs, and large feet which are only partially webbed. They have large spurs on their wings which are used in fights over mates and in territorial disputes. Two species have been recorded in Colombia.

- Horned screamer, Anhima cornuta (Linnaeus, 1766)
- Northern screamer, Chauna chavaria (Linnaeus, 1766)

== Ducks ==
Order: Anseriformes Family: Anatidae

Anatidae includes the ducks and most duck-like waterfowl, such as geese and swans. These birds are adapted to an aquatic existence with webbed feet, flattened bills, and feathers that are excellent at shedding water due to an oily coating. Thirty-five species have been recorded in Colombia.

- Fulvous whistling-duck, Dendrocygna bicolor (Vieillot, 1816)
- White-faced whistling-duck, Dendrocygna viduata (Linnaeus, 1766)
- Black-bellied whistling-duck, Dendrocygna autumnalis (Linnaeus, 1758)
- West Indian whistling-duck, Dendrocygna arborea (Linnaeus, 1758) (UN)(V)
- Snow goose, Anser caerulescens (Linnaeus, 1758) (UN)(V)
- Orinoco goose, Oressochen jubata (Spix, 1825)
- Ruddy shelduck, Tadorna ferruginea (Pallas, 1764) (UN)(V)
- Common shelduck, Tadorna tadorna (Linnaeus, 1758) (UN)(V)
- Muscovy duck, Cairina moschata (Linnaeus, 1758)
- Comb duck, Sarkidiornis sylvicola Ihering, HFA & Ihering, R, 1907
- Brazilian teal, Amazonetta brasiliensis (Gmelin, JF, 1789)
- Torrent duck, Merganetta armata Gould, 1842
- Baikal teal, Sibirionetta formosa (Georgi, 1775) (UN)(I)
- Puna teal, Spatula puna (Tschudi, 1844) (U)
- Northern shoveler, Spatula clypeata (Linnaeus, 1758)
- Blue-winged teal, Spatula discors (Linnaeus, 1766)
- Cinnamon teal, Spatula cyanoptera (Vieillot, 1816)
- Gadwall, Mareca strepera (Linnaeus, 1758) (SA)
- Falcated duck, Mareca falcata (Georgi, 1775) (UN)(V)
- Eurasian wigeon, Mareca penelope (Linnaeus, 1758) (UN)(V)
- American wigeon, Mareca americana (Gmelin, JF, 1789)
- White-cheeked pintail, Anas bahamensis Linnaeus, 1758
- Northern pintail, Anas acuta Linnaeus, 1758
- Yellow-billed pintail, Anas georgica Gmelin, JF, 1789
- Green-winged teal, Anas crecca Linnaeus, 1758 (V)
- Andean teal, Anas andium (Sclater, PL & Salvin, 1873)
- Southern pochard, Netta erythrophthalma (Wied-Neuwied, M, 1833)
- Ring-necked duck, Aythya collaris (Donovan, 1809) (V)
- Common pochard, Aythya ferina (Linnaeus, 1758) VU (UN)(V)
- Tufted duck, Aythya fuligula (Linnaeus, 1758) (UN)(V)
- Lesser scaup, Aythya affinis (Eyton, 1838)
- Baer's pochard, Aythya baeri (Radde, 1863) CR (UN)(I)
- Velvet scoter, Melanitta fusca (Linnaeus, 1758) (UN)(V)
- Masked duck, Nomonyx dominicus (Linnaeus, 1766)
- Ruddy duck, Oxyura jamaicensis (Gmelin, JF, 1789)
- Red-breasted merganser, Mergus serrator Linnaeus, 1758 (SA)

== Guans ==
Order: Galliformes Family: Cracidae

The Cracidae are large birds, similar in general appearance to turkeys. The guans and curassows live in trees, but the smaller chachalacas are found in more open scrubby habitats. They are generally dull-plumaged, but the curassows and some guans have colorful facial ornaments. Colombia has the largest number of cracids of any country; twenty-six have been recorded there.

- Sickle-winged guan, Chamaepetes goudotii (Lesson, RP, 1828)
- Band-tailed guan, Penelope argyrotis (Bonaparte, 1856)
- Baudo guan, Penelope ortoni Salvin, 1874 EN
- Andean guan, Penelope montagnii (Bonaparte, 1856)
- Spix's guan, Penelope jacquacu Spix, 1825
- Crested guan, Penelope purpurascens Wagler, 1830 NT
- Cauca guan, Penelope perspicax Bangs, 1911 (E) VU
- Blue-throated piping-guan, Pipile cumanensis (Jacquin, 1784)
- Wattled guan, Aburria aburri (Lesson, RP, 1828)
- Gray-headed chachalaca, Ortalis cinereiceps Gray, GR, 1867
- Chestnut-winged chachalaca, Ortalis garrula (Humboldt, 1805) (E)
- Rufous-vented chachalaca, Ortalis ruficauda Jardine, 1847
- Rufous-headed chachalaca, Ortalis erythroptera Sclater, PL & Salvin, 1870 VU
- Colombian chachalaca, Ortalis columbiana Hellmayr, 1906 (E)
- Speckled chachalaca, Ortalis guttata (Spix, 1825)
- Variable chachalaca, Ortalis motmot (Linnaeus, 1766) (U)
- Nocturnal curassow, Nothocrax urumutum (Spix, 1825)
- Great curassow, Crax rubra Linnaeus, 1758 VU
- Blue-billed curassow, Crax alberti Fraser, 1852 (E) CR
- Yellow-knobbed curassow, Crax daubentoni Gray, GR, 1867 NT
- Black curassow, Crax alector Linnaeus, 1766
- Wattled curassow, Crax globulosa Spix, 1825 EN
- Crestless curassow, Mitu tomentosum (Spix, 1825)
- Salvin's curassow, Mitu salvini Reinhardt, 1879
- Razor-billed curassow, Mitu tuberosum (Spix, 1825) NT
- Helmeted curassow, Pauxi pauxi (Linnaeus, 1766) VU

== New World quails ==
Order: Galliformes Family: Odontophoridae

The New World quails are small, plump terrestrial birds only distantly related to the quails of the Old World, but named for their similar appearance and habits. Ten species have been recorded in Colombia.

- Tawny-faced quail, Rhynchortyx cinctus (Salvin, 1876) NT
- Crested bobwhite, Colinus cristatus (Linnaeus, 1766)
- Marbled wood-quail, Odontophorus gujanensis (Gmelin, JF, 1789)
- Black-fronted wood-quail, Odontophorus atrifrons Allen, JA, 1900
- Rufous-fronted wood-quail, Odontophorus erythrops Gould, 1859
- Chestnut wood-quail, Odontophorus hyperythrus Gould, 1858 (E)
- Dark-backed wood-quail, Odontophorus melanonotus Gould, 1861
- Rufous-breasted wood-quail, Odontophorus speciosus Tschudi, 1843
- Tacarcuna wood-quail, Odontophorus dialeucos Wetmore, 1963
- Gorgeted wood-quail, Odontophorus strophium (Gould, 1844) (E) VU

== Flamingos ==
Order: Phoenicopteriformes Family: Phoenicopteridae

Flamingos are gregarious wading birds, usually 3 to 5 feet (0.9 to 1.5 m) tall, found in both the Western and Eastern Hemispheres. Flamingos filter-feed on shellfish and algae. Their oddly shaped beaks are specially adapted to separate mud and silt from the food they consume and, uniquely, are used upside-down. Two species have been recorded in Colombia.

- Chilean flamingo, Phoenicopterus chilensis (Molina, 1782) (V) NT
- American flamingo, Phoenicopterus ruber Linnaeus, 1758

== Grebes ==
Order: Podicipediformes Family: Podicipedidae

Grebes are small to medium-large freshwater diving birds. They have lobed toes and are excellent swimmers and divers. However, they have their feet placed far back on the body, making them quite ungainly on land. Four species have been recorded in Colombia.

- Least grebe, Tachybaptus dominicus (Linnaeus, 1766)
- Pied-billed grebe, Podilymbus podiceps (Linnaeus, 1758)
- Colombian grebe, Podiceps andinus (Meyer de Schauensee, 1959) (E) EX
- Silvery grebe, Podiceps occipitalis Garnot, 1826

== Pigeons ==
Order: Columbiformes Family: Columbidae

Pigeons and doves are stout-bodied birds with short necks and short slender bills with a fleshy cere. Forty species have been recorded in Colombia.

- Rock pigeon, Columba livia Gmelin, JF, 1789 (I)
- Scaly-naped pigeon, Patagioenas squamosa (Bonnaterre, 1792) (UN)(V)
- White-crowned pigeon, Patagioenas leucocephala (Linnaeus, 1758) NT
- Scaled pigeon, Patagioenas speciosa (Gmelin, JF, 1789)
- Bare-eyed pigeon, Patagioenas corensis (Jacquin, 1784)
- Band-tailed pigeon, Patagioenas fasciata (Say, 1822)
- Pale-vented pigeon, Patagioenas cayennensis (Bonnaterre, 1792)
- Plumbeous pigeon, Patagioenas plumbea (Vieillot, 1818)
- Ruddy pigeon, Patagioenas subvinacea (Lawrence, 1868)
- Short-billed pigeon, Patagioenas nigrirostris (Sclater, PL, 1860)
- Dusky pigeon, Patagioenas goodsoni (Hartert, EJO, 1902)
- European turtle-dove, Streptopelia turtur (Linnaeus, 1758) (UN)(I)
- Purple quail-dove, Geotrygon purpurata (Salvin, 1878) EN
- Sapphire quail-dove, Geotrygon saphirina Bonaparte, 1855
- Ruddy quail-dove, Geotrygon montana (Linnaeus, 1758)
- Violaceous quail-dove, Geotrygon violacea (Temminck, 1809)
- Olive-backed quail-dove, Leptotrygon veraguensis (Lawrence, 1866)
- White-tipped dove, Leptotila verreauxi Bonaparte, 1855
- Caribbean dove, Leptotila jamaicensis (Linnaeus, 1766) (SA)
- Gray-chested dove, Leptotila cassinii Lawrence, 1867
- Tolima dove, Leptotila conoveri Bond, J & Meyer de Schauensee, 1943 (E) NT
- Gray-headed dove, Leptotila plumbeiceps Sclater, PL & Salvin, 1868
- Gray-fronted dove, Leptotila rufaxilla (Richard & Bernard, 1792)
- Pallid dove, Leptotila pallida Berlepsch & Taczanowski, 1884
- White-throated quail-dove, Zentrygon frenata (Tschudi, 1843)
- Lined quail-dove, Zentrygon linearis (Prévost, 1843)
- Russet-crowned quail-dove, Zentrygon goldmani (Nelson, 1912) NT
- White-winged dove, Zenaida asiatica (Linnaeus, 1758) (V)
- Eared dove, Zenaida auriculata (des Murs, 1847)
- Mourning dove, Zenaida macroura (Linnaeus, 1758) (V)
- Blue ground dove, Claravis pretiosa (Ferrari-Pérez, 1886)
- Maroon-chested ground dove, Paraclaravis mondetoura (Bonaparte, 1856)
- Black-winged ground dove, Metriopelia melanoptera (Molina, 1782)
- Common ground dove, Columbina passerina (Linnaeus, 1758)
- Plain-breasted ground dove, Columbina minuta (Linnaeus, 1766)
- Ruddy ground dove, Columbina talpacoti (Temminck, 1810)
- Ecuadorian ground dove, Columbina buckleyi (Sclater, PL & Salvin, 1877)
- Scaled dove, Columbina squammata (Lesson, RP, 1831)
- Picui ground dove, Columbina picui (Temminck, 1813)
- Croaking ground dove, Columbina cruziana (Prévost, 1842)

== Cuckoos ==
Order: Cuculiformes Family: Cuculidae

The family Cuculidae includes cuckoos, roadrunners, and anis. These birds are of variable size with slender bodies, long tails and strong legs. Twenty-two species have been recorded in Colombia.

- Greater ani, Crotophaga major Gmelin, JF, 1788
- Smooth-billed ani, Crotophaga ani Linnaeus, 1758
- Groove-billed ani, Crotophaga sulcirostris Swainson, 1827
- Himalayan cuckoo, Cuculus saturatus Blyth, 1843 (UN)(V)
- Striped cuckoo, Tapera naevia (Linnaeus, 1766)
- Pheasant cuckoo, Dromococcyx phasianellus (Spix, 1824)
- Pavonine cuckoo, Dromococcyx pavoninus Pelzeln, 1870
- Rufous-vented ground-cuckoo, Neomorphus geoffroyi (Temminck, 1820)
- Banded ground-cuckoo, Neomorphus radiolosus Sclater, PL & Salvin, 1878 VU
- Rufous-winged ground-cuckoo, Neomorphus rufipennis (Gray, GR, 1849) (U)
- Red-billed ground-cuckoo, Neomorphus pucheranii (Deville, 1851)
- Little cuckoo, Coccycua minuta (Vieillot, 1817)
- Dwarf cuckoo, Coccycua pumila (Strickland, 1852)
- Ash-colored cuckoo, Coccycua cinerea (Vieillot, 1817) (U)
- Squirrel cuckoo, Piaya cayana (Linnaeus, 1766)
- Black-bellied cuckoo, Piaya melanogaster (Vieillot, 1817)
- Dark-billed cuckoo, Coccyzus melacoryphus Vieillot, 1817
- Yellow-billed cuckoo, Coccyzus americanus (Linnaeus, 1758)
- Pearly-breasted cuckoo, Coccyzus euleri Cabanis, 1873 (V)
- Mangrove cuckoo, Coccyzus minor (Gmelin, JF, 1788) (V)
- Black-billed cuckoo, Coccyzus erythropthalmus (Wilson, A, 1811)
- Gray-capped cuckoo, Coccyzus lansbergi Bonaparte, 1850

== Oilbird ==
Order: Steatornithiformes Family: Steatornithidae

The oilbird is a slim, long-winged bird related to the nightjars. It is nocturnal and a specialist feeder on the fruit of the oil palm.

- Oilbird, Steatornis caripensis Humboldt, 1817

== Potoos ==
Order: Nyctibiiformes Family: Nyctibiidae

The potoos (sometimes called poor-me-ones) are large near passerine birds related to the nightjars and frogmouths. They are nocturnal insectivores which lack the bristles around the mouth found in the true nightjars. Six species have been recorded in Colombia.

- Rufous potoo, Phyllaemulor bracteatus (Gould, 1846)
- Great potoo, Nyctibius grandis (Gmelin, JF, 1789)
- Long-tailed potoo, Nyctibius aethereus (Wied-Neuwied, M, 1820)
- Common potoo, Nyctibius griseus (Gmelin, JF, 1789)
- Andean potoo, Nyctibius maculosus Ridgway, 1912
- White-winged potoo, Nyctibius leucopterus (Wied-Neuwied, M, 1821)

== Nightjars ==
Order: Caprimulgiformes Family: Caprimulgidae

Nightjars are medium-sized nocturnal birds that usually nest on the ground. They have long wings, short legs, and very short bills. Most have small feet, of little use for walking, and long pointed wings. Their soft plumage is camouflaged to resemble bark or leaves. Twenty-two species have been recorded in Colombia.

- Nacunda nighthawk, Chordeiles nacunda (Vieillot, 1817)
- Least nighthawk, Chordeiles pusillus Gould, 1861
- Sand-colored nighthawk, Chordeiles rupestris (Spix, 1825)
- Lesser nighthawk, Chordeiles acutipennis (Hermann, 1783)
- Common nighthawk, Chordeiles minor (Forster, JR, 1771)
- Antillean nighthawk, Chordeiles gundlachii (Lawrence, 1857)
- Band-tailed nighthawk, Nyctiprogne leucopyga (Spix, 1825)
- Short-tailed nighthawk, Lurocalis semitorquatus (Gmelin, JF, 1789)
- Rufous-bellied nighthawk, Lurocalis rufiventris Taczanowski, 1884
- Blackish nightjar, Nyctipolus nigrescens (Cabanis, 1849)
- Common pauraque, Nyctidromus albicollis (Gmelin, JF, 1789)
- Swallow-tailed nightjar, Uropsalis segmentata (Cassin, 1849)
- Lyre-tailed nightjar, Uropsalis lyra (Bonaparte, 1850)
- Todd's nightjar, Setopagis heterura Todd, 1915
- White-tailed nightjar, Hydropsalis cayennensis (Gmelin, JF, 1789)
- Spot-tailed nightjar, Hydropsalis maculicaudus (Lawrence, 1862)
- Ladder-tailed nightjar, Hydropsalis climacocerca (Tschudi, 1844)
- Band-winged nightjar, Systellura longirostris (Bonaparte, 1825)
- Choco poorwill, Nyctiphrynus rosenbergi (Hartert, EJO, 1895)
- Ocellated poorwill, Nyctiphrynus ocellatus (Tschudi, 1844)
- Chuck-will's-widow, Antrostomus carolinensis (Gmelin, JF, 1789) NT
- Rufous nightjar, Antrostomus rufus (Boddaert, 1783)

== Swifts ==
Order: Apodiformes Family: Apodidae

Swifts are small birds which spend the majority of their lives flying. These birds have very short legs and never settle voluntarily on the ground, perching instead only on vertical surfaces. Many swifts have long swept-back wings which resemble a crescent or boomerang. Nineteen species have been recorded in Colombia.

- Spot-fronted swift, Cypseloides cherriei Ridgway, 1893
- White-chinned swift, Cypseloides cryptus Zimmer, JT, 1945
- Black swift, Cypseloides niger (Gmelin, JF, 1789) VU
- White-chested swift, Cypseloides lemosi Eisenmann & Lehmann, 1962
- Chestnut-collared swift, Streptoprocne rutila (Vieillot, 1817)
- White-collared swift, Streptoprocne zonaris (Shaw, 1796)
- Gray-rumped swift, Chaetura cinereiventris Sclater, PL, 1862
- Band-rumped swift, Chaetura spinicaudus (Temminck, 1839)
- Pale-rumped swift, Chaetura egregia Todd, 1916 (V)
- Chimney swift, Chaetura pelagica (Linnaeus, 1758) VU
- Chapman's swift, Chaetura chapmani Hellmayr, 1907
- Sick's swift, Chaetura meridionalis Hellmayr, 1907
- Short-tailed swift, Chaetura brachyura (Jardine, 1846)
- White-tipped swift, Aeronautes montivagus (d'Orbigny & Lafresnaye, 1837)
- Common swift, Apus apus (Linnaeus, 1758) (UN)(V)
- Pacific swift, Apus pacificus (Latham, 1801) (UN)(V)
- Pygmy palm swift, Tachornis furcata (Sutton, 1928)
- Fork-tailed palm swift, Tachornis squamata (Cassin, 1853)
- Lesser swallow-tailed swift, Panyptila cayennensis (Gmelin, JF, 1789)

== Hummingbirds ==
Order: Apodiformes Family: Trochilidae

Hummingbirds are small birds capable of hovering in mid-air due to the rapid flapping of their wings. They are the only birds that can fly backwards. Colombia has the greatest diversity of hummingbirds of any country on earth. One hundred sixty-eight species have been recorded there.

- Fiery topaz, Topaza pyra (Gould, 1846)
- White-necked jacobin, Florisuga mellivora (Linnaeus, 1758)
- White-tipped sicklebill, Eutoxeres aquila (Bourcier, 1847)
- Buff-tailed sicklebill, Eutoxeres condamini (Bourcier, 1851)
- Bronzy hermit, Glaucis aeneus Lawrence, 1868
- Rufous-breasted hermit, Glaucis hirsutus (Gmelin, JF, 1788)
- Band-tailed barbthroat, Threnetes ruckeri (Bourcier, 1847)
- Pale-tailed barbthroat, Threnetes leucurus (Linnaeus, 1766)
- Streak-throated hermit, Phaethornis rupurumii Boucard, 1892
- Black-throated hermit, Phaethornis atrimentalis Lawrence, 1858
- Stripe-throated hermit, Phaethornis striigularis Gould, 1854
- Gray-chinned hermit, Phaethornis griseogularis Gould, 1851
- Reddish hermit, Phaethornis ruber (Linnaeus, 1758)
- Sooty-capped hermit, Phaethornis augusti (Bourcier, 1847)
- Pale-bellied hermit, Phaethornis anthophilus (Bourcier, 1843)
- White-bearded hermit, Phaethornis hispidus (Gould, 1846)
- White-whiskered hermit, Phaethornis yaruqui (Bourcier, 1851)
- Green hermit, Phaethornis guy (Lesson, RP, 1833)
- Tawny-bellied hermit, Phaethornis syrmatophorus Gould, 1852
- Straight-billed hermit, Phaethornis bourcieri (Lesson, RP, 1832)
- Long-billed hermit, Phaethornis longirostris (Delattre, 1843)
- Great-billed hermit, Phaethornis malaris (Nordmann, 1835)
- Green-fronted lancebill, Doryfera ludovicae (Bourcier & Mulsant, 1847)
- Blue-fronted lancebill, Doryfera johannae (Bourcier, 1847)
- White-throated daggerbill, Schistes albogularis Gould, 1852
- Geoffroy's daggerbill, Schistes geoffroyi (Bourcier, 1843)
- Brown violetear, Colibri delphinae (Lesson, RP, 1839)
- Lesser violetear, Colibri cyanotus (Bourcier, 1843)
- Sparkling violetear, Colibri coruscans (Gould, 1846)
- Tooth-billed hummingbird, Androdon aequatorialis Gould, 1863
- Purple-crowned fairy, Heliothryx barroti (Bourcier, 1843)
- Black-eared fairy, Heliothryx auritus (Gmelin, JF, 1788)
- White-tailed goldenthroat, Polytmus guainumbi (Pallas, 1764)
- Green-tailed goldenthroat, Polytmus theresiae (da Silva Maia, 1843)
- Fiery-tailed awlbill, Avocettula recurvirostris (Swainson, 1822) (V)
- Ruby-topaz hummingbird, Chrysolampis mosquitus (Linnaeus, 1758)
- Green-breasted mango, Anthracothorax prevostii (Lesson, RP, 1832)
- Black-throated mango, Anthracothorax nigricollis (Vieillot, 1817)
- Orange-throated sunangel, Heliangelus mavors Gould, 1848
- Amethyst-throated sunangel, Heliangelus amethysticollis (d'Orbigny & Lafresnaye, 1838)
- Gorgeted sunangel, Heliangelus strophianus (Gould, 1846)
- Tourmaline sunangel, Heliangelus exortis (Fraser, 1840)
- Bogota sunangel, Heliangelus zusii Graves, 1993 (see note) (Note: The 2015 list does not include this species) (E)
- Green thorntail, Discosura conversii (Bourcier & Mulsant, 1846)
- Wire-crested thorntail, Discosura popelairii (Du Bus de Gisignies, 1846)
- Black-bellied thorntail, Discosura langsdorffi (Temminck, 1821)
- Racket-tipped thorntail, Discosura longicaudus (Gmelin, JF, 1788)
- Rufous-crested coquette, Lophornis delattrei (Lesson, RP, 1839)
- Spangled coquette, Lophornis stictolophus Salvin & Elliot, DG, 1873
- Butterfly coquette, Lophornis verreauxii Bourcier, 1853
- Ecuadorian piedtail, Phlogophilus hemileucurus Gould, 1860
- Speckled hummingbird, Adelomyia melanogenys (Fraser, 1840)
- Long-tailed sylph, Aglaiocercus kingii (Lesson, RP, 1832)
- Violet-tailed sylph, Aglaiocercus coelestis (Gould, 1861)
- Ecuadorian hillstar, Oreotrochilus chimborazo (Delattre & Bourcier, 1846)
- Mountain avocetbill, Opisthoprora euryptera (Loddiges, 1832)
- Black-tailed trainbearer, Lesbia victoriae (Bourcier & Mulsant, 1846)
- Green-tailed trainbearer, Lesbia nuna (Lesson, RP, 1832)
- Black-backed thornbill, Ramphomicron dorsale Salvin & Godman, 1880 (E) NT
- Purple-backed thornbill, Ramphomicron microrhynchum (Boissonneau, 1840)
- Buffy helmetcrest, Oxypogon stuebelii Meyer, AB, 1884 (E) VU
- Blue-bearded helmetcrest, Oxypogon cyanolaemus Salvin & Godman, 1880 (E) EN
- Green-bearded helmetcrest, Oxypogon guerinii (Boissonneau, 1840) (E)
- Rufous-capped thornbill, Chalcostigma ruficeps (Gould, 1846) (V)
- Blue-mantled thornbill, Chalcostigma stanleyi (Bourcier, 1851)
- Bronze-tailed thornbill, Chalcostigma heteropogon (Boissonneau, 1840)
- Rainbow-bearded thornbill, Chalcostigma herrani (Delattre & Bourcier, 1846)
- Tyrian metaltail, Metallura tyrianthina (Loddiges, 1832)
- Perija metaltail, Metallura iracunda Wetmore, 1946 NT
- Viridian metaltail, Metallura williami (Delattre & Bourcier, 1846)
- Greenish puffleg, Haplophaedia aureliae (Bourcier & Mulsant, 1846)
- Hoary puffleg, Haplophaedia lugens (Gould, 1852) NT
- Gorgeted puffleg, Eriocnemis isabellae Cortés-Diago, Ortega, Mazariegos-Hurtado & Weller, 2007 (E) CR
- Glowing puffleg, Eriocnemis vestita (Lesson, RP, 1839)
- Black-thighed puffleg, Eriocnemis derbyi (Delattre & Bourcier, 1846)
- Turquoise-throated puffleg, Eriocnemis godini (Bourcier, 1851)
- Coppery-bellied puffleg, Eriocnemis cupreoventris (Fraser, 1840)
- Sapphire-vented puffleg, Eriocnemis luciani (Bourcier, 1847)
- Golden-breasted puffleg, Eriocnemis mosquera (Delattre & Bourcier, 1846)
- Colorful puffleg, Eriocnemis mirabilis Meyer de Schauensee, 1967 (E) EN
- Emerald-bellied puffleg, Eriocnemis aline (Bourcier, 1843)
- Shining sunbeam, Aglaeactis cupripennis (Bourcier, 1843)
- Bronzy inca, Coeligena coeligena (Lesson, RP, 1833)
- Brown inca, Coeligena wilsoni (Delattre & Bourcier, 1846)
- Black inca, Coeligena prunellei (Bourcier, 1843) (E) VU
- Collared inca, Coeligena torquata (Boissonneau, 1840)
- White-tailed starfrontlet, Coeligena phalerata (Bangs, 1898) (E) NT
- Dusky starfrontlet, Coeligena orina Wetmore, 1953 (E) EN
- Perija starfrontlet, Coeligena consita Wetmore & Phelps, WH Jr, 1952 (see note) (Note: The SACC considers this entry to be a subspecies of golden-bellied starfrontlet, but it is recognized by some other authorities. The committee has not yet received a proposal for the split.) EN
- Buff-winged starfrontlet, Coeligena lutetiae (Delattre & Bourcier, 1846)
- Golden-bellied starfrontlet, Coeligena bonapartei (Boissonneau, 1840)
- Blue-throated starfrontlet, Coeligena helianthea (Lesson, RP, 1839)
- Mountain velvetbreast, Lafresnaya lafresnayi (Boissonneau, 1840)
- Sword-billed hummingbird, Ensifera ensifera (Boissonneau, 1840)
- Great sapphirewing, Pterophanes cyanopterus (Fraser, 1840)
- Buff-tailed coronet, Boissonneaua flavescens (Loddiges, 1832)
- Chestnut-breasted coronet, Boissonneaua matthewsii (Bourcier, 1847)
- Velvet-purple coronet, Boissonneaua jardini (Bourcier, 1851)
- Booted racket-tail, Ocreatus underwoodii (Lesson, RP, 1832)
- Rufous-gaped hillstar, Urochroa bougueri (Bourcier, 1851)
- Green-backed hillstar, Urochroa leucura Lawrence, 1864
- Purple-bibbed whitetip, Urosticte benjamini (Bourcier, 1851)
- Rufous-vented whitetip, Urosticte ruficrissa Lawrence, 1864
- Pink-throated brilliant, Heliodoxa gularis (Gould, 1860)
- Black-throated brilliant, Heliodoxa schreibersii (Bourcier, 1847)
- Gould's jewelfront, Heliodoxa aurescens (Gould, 1846)
- Fawn-breasted brilliant, Heliodoxa rubinoides (Bourcier & Mulsant, 1846)
- Green-crowned brilliant, Heliodoxa jacula Gould, 1850
- Empress brilliant, Heliodoxa imperatrix (Gould, 1856)
- Violet-fronted brilliant, Heliodoxa leadbeateri (Bourcier, 1843)
- Northern giant-hummingbird, Patagona peruviana (Bucard, 1893)
- Violet-chested hummingbird, Sternoclyta cyanopectus (Gould, 1846)
- Long-billed starthroat, Heliomaster longirostris (Audebert & Vieillot, 1801)
- Blue-tufted starthroat, Heliomaster furcifer (Shaw, 1812)
- White-bellied woodstar, Chaetocercus mulsant (Bourcier, 1843)
- Little woodstar, Chaetocercus bombus Gould, 1871 (U) NT
- Gorgeted woodstar, Chaetocercus heliodor (Bourcier, 1840)
- Santa Marta woodstar, Chaetocercus astreans (Bangs, 1899) (E)
- Rufous-shafted woodstar, Chaetocercus jourdanii (Bourcier, 1839)
- Amethyst woodstar, Calliphlox amethystina (Boddaert, 1783)
- Purple-throated woodstar, Philodice mitchellii (Bourcier, 1847)
- Ruby-throated hummingbird, Archilochus colubris (Linnaeus, 1758) (SA) (U)
- Western emerald, Chlorostilbon melanorhynchus Gould, 1860
- Red-billed emerald, Chlorostilbon gibsoni (Fraser, 1840)
- Blue-tailed emerald, Chlorostilbon mellisugus (Linnaeus, 1758)
- Chiribiquete emerald, Chlorostilbon olivaresi Stiles, 1996 (E)
- Coppery emerald, Chlorostilbon russatus (Salvin & Godman, 1881)
- Narrow-tailed emerald, Chlorostilbon stenurus (Cabanis & Heine, 1860)
- Short-tailed emerald, Chlorostilbon poortmani (Bourcier, 1843)
- Blue-chinned sapphire, Chlorestes notata (Reich, 1793)
- Violet-headed hummingbird, Klais guimeti (Bourcier, 1843)
- Santa Marta blossomcrown, Anthocephala floriceps (Gould, 1853) (E) VU
- Tolima blossomcrown, Anthocephala berlepschi Salvin, 1893 (E) VU
- Gray-breasted sabrewing, Campylopterus largipennis (Boddaert, 1783)
- Lazuline sabrewing, Campylopterus falcatus (Swainson, 1821)
- Santa Marta sabrewing, Campylopterus phainopeplus Salvin & Godman, 1879 (E) CR
- Napo sabrewing, Campylopterus villaviscensio (Bourcier, 1851)
- White-vented plumeleteer, Chalybura buffonii (Lesson, RP, 1832)
- Bronze-tailed plumeleteer, Chalybura urochrysia (Gould, 1861)
- Crowned woodnymph, Thalurania colombica (Bourcier, 1843)
- Fork-tailed woodnymph, Thalurania furcata (Gmelin, JF, 1788)
- Pirre hummingbird, Goldmania bella (Nelson, 1912) NT
- Violet-capped hummingbird, Goldmania violiceps Nelson, 1911 NT
- Scaly-breasted hummingbird, Phaeochroa cuvierii (Delattre & Bourcier, 1846)
- Buffy hummingbird, Leucippus fallax (Bourcier, 1843)
- Many-spotted hummingbird, Taphrospilus hypostictus (Gould, 1862)
- Olive-spotted hummingbird, Talaphorus chlorocercus (Gould, 1866)
- Snowy-bellied hummingbird, Saucerottia edward (Delattre & Bourcier, 1846)
- Steely-vented hummingbird, Saucerottia saucerottei (Delattre & Bourcier, 1846)
- Indigo-capped hummingbird, Saucerottia cyanifrons (Bourcier, 1843) (E)
- Chestnut-bellied hummingbird, Saucerottia castaneiventris (Gould, 1856) (E) NT
- Green-bellied hummingbird, Saucerottia viridigaster (Bourcier, 1843)
- Rufous-tailed hummingbird, Amazilia tzacatl (de la Llave, 1833)
- Andean emerald, Uranomitra franciae (Bourcier & Mulsant, 1846)
- Versicolored emerald, Chrysuronia versicolor (Vieillot, 1818)
- Shining-green hummingbird, Chrysuronia goudoti (Bourcier, 1843)
- Golden-tailed sapphire, Chrysuronia oenone (Lesson, RP, 1832)
- Sapphire-throated hummingbird, Chrysuronia coeruleogularis (Gould, 1851)
- Sapphire-bellied hummingbird, Chrysuronia lilliae (Stone, 1917) (E) EN
- Humboldt's sapphire, Chrysuronia humboldtii (Bourcier & Mulsant, 1852)
- Blue-headed sapphire, Chrysuronia grayi (Delattre & Bourcier, 1846)
- Glittering-throated emerald, Chionomesa fimbriata (Gmelin, JF, 1788)
- Rufous-throated sapphire, Hylocharis sapphirina (Gmelin, JF, 1788)
- Blue-chested hummingbird, Polyerata amabilis (Gould, 1853)
- Purple-chested hummingbird, Polyerata rosenbergi Boucard, 1895
- Blue-throated goldentail, Chlorestes eliciae (Bourcier & Mulsant, 1846)
- White-chinned sapphire, Chlorestes cyanus (Vieillot, 1818)
- Violet-bellied hummingbird, Chlorestes julie (Bourcier, 1843)

== Hoatzin ==
Order: Opisthocomiformes Family: Opisthocomidae

The hoatzin is pheasant-sized, but much slimmer. It has a long tail and neck, but a small head with an unfeathered blue face and red eyes which are topped by a spiky crest. It is a weak flier which is found in the swamps of the Amazon and Orinoco rivers.

- Hoatzin, Opisthocomus hoazin (Müller, PLS, 1776)

== Limpkin ==
Order: Gruiformes Family: Aramidae

The limpkin resembles a large rail. It has drab-brown plumage and a grayer head and neck.

- Limpkin, Aramus guarauna (Linnaeus, 1766)

== Trumpeters ==
Order: Gruiformes Family: Psophiidae

The trumpeters are dumpy birds with long necks and legs and chicken-like bills. They are named for the trumpeting call of the males. One species has been recorded in Colombia.

- Gray-winged trumpeter, Psophia crepitans Linnaeus, 1758

== Rails ==
Order: Gruiformes Family: Rallidae

Rallidae is a large family of small to medium-sized birds which includes the rails, crakes, coots, and gallinules. Typically they inhabit dense vegetation in damp environments near lakes, swamps, or rivers. In general they are shy and secretive birds, making them difficult to observe. Most species have strong legs and long toes which are well adapted to soft uneven surfaces. They tend to have short, rounded wings and to be weak fliers. Thirty-two species have been recorded in Colombia.

- Mangrove rail, Rallus longirostris Boddaert, 1783
- Virginia rail, Rallus limicola Vieillot, 1819
- Water rail, Rallus aquaticus Linnaeus, 1758 (UN)(V)
- Bogota rail, Rallus semiplumbeus Sclater, PL, 1856 VU
- Corn crake, Crex crex (Linnaeus, 1758) (UN)(V)
- Purple gallinule, Porphyrio martinica (Linnaeus, 1766)
- Azure gallinule, Porphyrio flavirostris (Gmelin, JF, 1789)
- Chestnut-headed crake, Anurolimnas castaneiceps
- Russet-crowned crake, Anurolimnas viridis
- Black-banded crake, Anurolimnas fasciatus
- Rufous-sided crake, Laterallus melanophaius (Vieillot, 1819)
- White-throated crake, Laterallus albigularis (Lawrence, 1861)
- Gray-breasted crake, Laterallus exilis (Temminck, 1831)
- Black rail, Laterallus jamaicensis (Gmelin, JF, 1789) (V)
- Speckled rail, Coturnicops notatus (Gould, 1841) (V)
- Ocellated crake, Micropygia schomburgkii (Schomburgk, 1848)
- Ash-throated crake, Mustelirallus albicollis (Vieillot, 1819)
- Colombian crake, Mustelirallus colombianus (Bangs, 1898) DD
- Paint-billed crake, Mustelirallus erythrops (Sclater, PL, 1867)
- Spotted rail, Pardirallus maculatus (Boddaert, 1783)
- Blackish rail, Pardirallus nigricans (Vieillot, 1819)
- Uniform crake, Amaurolimnas concolor (Gosse, 1847)
- Brown wood-rail, Aramides wolfi Berlepsch & Taczanowski, 1884
- Gray-cowled wood-rail, Aramides cajaneus (Müller, PLS, 1776)
- Rufous-necked wood-rail, Aramides axillaris Lawrence, 1863
- Spot-flanked gallinule, Porphyriops melanops (Vieillot, 1819)
- Yellow-breasted crake, Porzana flaviventer
- Sora, Porzana carolina (Linnaeus, 1758)
- Spotted crake, Porzana porzana (Linnaeus, 1766) (UN)(V)
- Common gallinule, Gallinula galeata (Lichtenstein, MHC, 1818)
- American coot, Fulica americana Gmelin, JF, 1789
- Slate-colored coot, Fulica ardesiaca Tschudi, 1843

== Finfoots ==
Order: Gruiformes Family: Heliornithidae

Heliornithidae is a small family of tropical birds with webbed lobes on their feet similar to those of grebes and coots. One species has been recorded in Colombia.

- Sungrebe, Heliornis fulica (Boddaert, 1783)

== Cranes ==
Order: Gruiformes Family: Gruidae

Cranes are large, long-legged and long-necked birds. Unlike the similar-looking but unrelated herons, cranes fly with necks outstretched, not pulled back. Most have elaborate and noisy courting displays or "dances". One species has been recorded in Colombia.

- Common crane, Grus grus (Linnaeus, 1758) (UN)(V)

== Plovers ==
Order: Charadriiformes Family: Charadriidae

The family Charadriidae includes the plovers, dotterels, and lapwings. They are small to medium-sized birds with compact bodies, short, thick necks and long, usually pointed, wings. They are found in open country worldwide, mostly in habitats near water. Thirteen species have been recorded in Colombia.

- Black-bellied plover, Pluvialis squatarola (Linnaeus, 1758) VU
- American golden-plover, Pluvialis dominica (Müller, PLS, 1776)
- Pied lapwing, Hoploxypteruss cayanus (Latham, 1790)
- Killdeer, Charadrius vociferus Linnaeus, 1758 NT
- Semipalmated plover, Charadrius semipalmatus Bonaparte, 1825
- Piping plover, Charadrius melodus Ord, 1824 (V) NT
- Northern lapwing, Vanellus vanellus Linnaeus, 1758 (UN)(V)
- Southern lapwing, Vanellus chilensis (Molina, 1782)
- Andean lapwing, Vanellus resplendens (Tschudi, 1843)
- Siberian sand-plover, Anarhynchus mongolus (Pallas, 1776) EN (UN)(V)
- Wilson's plover, Anarynchus wilsonia Ord, 1814
- Collared plover, Anarynchus collaris Vieillot, 1818
- Snowy plover, Anarynchus nivosus (Cassin, 1858) NT

== Oystercatchers ==
Order: Charadriiformes Family: Haematopodidae

The oystercatchers are large and noisy plover-like birds, with strong bills used for smashing or prising open molluscs. One species has been recorded in Colombia.

- American oystercatcher, Haematopus palliatus Temminck, 1820

== Avocets and stilts ==
Order: Charadriiformes Family: Recurvirostridae

Recurvirostridae is a family of large wading birds, which includes the avocets and stilts. The avocets have long legs and long up-curved bills. The stilts have extremely long legs and long, thin, straight bills. Two species have been recorded in Colombia.

- Black-necked stilt, Himantopus mexicanus (Müller, PLS, 1776)
- American avocet, Recurvirostra americana Gmelin, JF, 1789 (V)

== Thick-knees ==
Order: Charadriiformes Family: Burhinidae

The thick-knees are a group of waders found worldwide within the tropical zone, with some species also breeding in temperate Europe and Australia. They are medium to large waders with strong black or yellow-black bills, large yellow eyes, and cryptic plumage. Despite being classed as waders, most species have a preference for arid or semi-arid habitats. Two species have been recorded in Colombia.

- Double-striped thick-knee, Hesperoburhinus bistriatus
- Eurasian stone-curlew, Burhinus oedicnemus (Linnaeus, 1758) (UN)(V)

== Sandpipers ==
Order: Charadriiformes Family: Scolopacidae

Scolopacidae is a large diverse family of small to medium-sized shorebirds including the sandpipers, curlews, godwits, shanks, tattlers, woodcocks, snipes, dowitchers, and phalaropes. The majority of these species eat small invertebrates picked out of the mud or soil. Variation in length of legs and bills enables multiple species to feed in the same habitat, particularly on the coast, without direct competition for food. Forty-five species have been recorded in Colombia.

- Upland sandpiper, Bartramia longicauda (Bechstein, 1812)
- Whimbrel, Numenius phaeopus (Linnaeus, 1758)
- Long-billed curlew, Numenius americanus Bechstein, 1812 (U)
- Black-tailed godwit, Limosa limosa (Linnaeus, 1758) NT (UN)(V)
- Hudsonian godwit, Limosa haemastica (Linnaeus, 1758) VU
- Marbled godwit, Limosa fedoa (Linnaeus, 1758) VU
- Ruddy turnstone, Arenaria interpres (Linnaeus, 1758) NT
- Great knot, Calidris tenuirostris (Horsfield, 1821) EN (UN)(V)
- Red knot, Calidris canutus (Linnaeus, 1758) NT
- Surfbird, Calidris virgata (Gmelin, JF, 1789)
- Ruff, Calidris pugnax (Linnaeus, 1758) (V)
- Stilt sandpiper, Calidris himantopus (Bonaparte, 1826) NT
- Red-necked stint, Calidris ruficollis (Pallas, 1776) (UN)(V)
- Sanderling, Calidris alba (Pallas, 1764)
- Long-toed stint, Calidris subminuta (Middendorff, 1853) (UN)(V)
- Spoon-billed sandpiper, Calidris pygmaea (Linnaeus, 1758) (UN)(V)
- Dunlin, Calidris alpina (Linnaeus, 1758) NT
- Baird's sandpiper, Calidris bairdii (Coues, 1861)
- Least sandpiper, Calidris minutilla (Vieillot, 1819) NT
- White-rumped sandpiper, Calidris fuscicollis (Vieillot, 1819) VU
- Buff-breasted sandpiper, Calidris subruficollis (Vieillot, 1819) VU
- Pectoral sandpiper, Calidris melanotos (Vieillot, 1819)
- Semipalmated sandpiper, Calidris pusilla (Linnaeus, 1766) NT
- Western sandpiper, Calidris mauri (Cabanis, 1857)
- Short-billed dowitcher, Limnodromus griseus (Gmelin, JF, 1789) VU
- Long-billed dowitcher, Limnodromus scolopaceus (Say, 1822)
- Jack snipe, Lymnocryptes minimus (Brünnich, 1764) (UN)(V)
- Imperial snipe, Gallinago imperialis Sclater, PL & Salvin, 1869 NT
- Jameson's snipe, Gallinago jamesoni (Jardine & Bonaparte, 1855)
- Noble snipe, Gallinago nobilis Sclater, PL, 1856 NT
- Giant snipe, Gallinago undulata (Boddaert, 1783) (V)
- Wilson's snipe, Gallinago delicata (Ord, 1825)
- Pantanal snipe, Gallinago paraguaiae (Vieillot, 1816)
- Wilson's phalarope, Phalaropus tricolor (Vieillot, 1819)
- Red-necked phalarope, Phalaropus lobatus (Linnaeus, 1758)
- Red phalarope, Phalaropus fulicarius (Linnaeus, 1758) (V)
- Spotted sandpiper, Actitis macularius (Linnaeus, 1766)
- Solitary sandpiper, Tringa solitaria Wilson, A, 1813
- Gray-tailed tattler, Tringa brevipes (Vieillot, 1816) (UN)(V)
- Wandering tattler, Tringa incana (Gmelin, JF, 1789)
- Common redshank, Tringa totanus (Linnaeus, 1758) (UN)(V)
- Wood sandpiper, Tringa glareola (Linnaeus, 1758) (UN)(V)
- Greater yellowlegs, Tringa melanoleuca (Gmelin, JF, 1789) NT
- Willet, Tringa semipalmata (Gmelin, JF, 1789)
- Lesser yellowlegs, Tringa flavipes (Gmelin, JF, 1789) VU

== Seedsnipes ==
Order: Charadriiformes Family: Thinocoridae

The seedsnipes are a small family of birds that superficially resemble sparrows. They have short legs and long wings and are herbivorous waders. One species has been recorded in Colombia.

- Rufous-bellied seedsnipe, Attagis gayi Geoffroy Saint-Hilaire, É & Lesson, RP, 1831

== Jacanas ==
Order: Charadriiformes Family: Jacanidae

The jacanas are a family of waders found throughout the tropics. They are identifiable by their huge feet and claws which enable them to walk on floating vegetation in the shallow lakes that are their preferred habitat. One species has been recorded in Colombia.

- Wattled jacana, Jacana jacana (Linnaeus, 1766)

== Skuas ==
Order: Charadriiformes Family: Stercorariidae

The family Stercorariidae are, in general, medium to large birds, typically with gray or brown plumage, often with white markings on the wings. They nest on the ground in temperate and arctic regions and are long-distance migrants. Five species have been recorded in Colombia.

- Great skua, Stercorarius skua (Brünnich, 1764) (U)
- South polar skua, Stercorarius maccormicki Saunders, H, 1893 (U)
- Pomarine jaeger, Stercorarius pomarinus (Temminck, 1815)
- Parasitic jaeger, Stercorarius parasiticus (Linnaeus, 1758)
- Long-tailed jaeger, Stercorarius longicaudus Vieillot, 1819

== Gulls ==
Order: Charadriiformes Family: Laridae

Laridae is a family of medium to large seabirds and includes gulls, terns, and skimmers. Gulls are typically gray or white, often with black markings on the head or wings. They have webbed feet. Terns are a group of generally medium to large seabirds typically with gray or white plumage, often with black markings on the head. Most terns hunt fish by diving but some pick insects off the surface of fresh water. Terns are generally long-lived birds, with several species known to live in excess of 30 years. Thirty-eight species of Laridae have been recorded in Colombia.

- Brown noddy, Anous stolidus (Linnaeus, 1758)
- Black noddy, Anous minutus Boie, F, 1844
- Blue-billed white-tern, Gygis candida (Gmelin, JF, 1789)
- Black skimmer, Rynchops niger Linnaeus, 1758
- Swallow-tailed gull, Creagrus furcatus (Néboux, 1842)
- Sabine's gull, Xema sabini (Sabine, 1819)
- Andean gull, Chroicocephalus serranus (Tschudi, 1844)
- Gray-hooded gull, Chroicocephalus cirrocephalus (Vieillot, 1818) (V)
- Black-headed gull, Chroicocephalus ridibundus (Linnaeus, 1766) (U)
- Little gull, Hydrocoloeus minutus (Pallas, 1776) (V)
- Gray gull, Leucophaeus modestus (Tschudi, 1843) (V)
- Laughing gull, Leucophaeus atricilla (Linnaeus, 1758)
- Franklin's gull, Leucophaeus pipixcan (Wagler, 1831)
- Belcher's gull, Larus belcheri Vigors, 1829 (V)
- Black-tailed gull, Larus crassirostris Vieillot, 1818 (UN)(V)
- Ring-billed gull, Larus delawarensis Ord, 1815 (V)
- Great black-backed gull, Larus marinus Linnaeus, 1758 (U)
- Kelp gull, Larus dominicanus Lichtenstein, MHC, 1823 (V)
- Lesser black-backed gull, Larus fuscus Linnaeus, 1758 (V)
- Herring gull, Larus argentatus Pontoppidan, 1763 (V)
- Sooty tern, Onychoprion fuscatus (Linnaeus, 1766) (V)
- Bridled tern, Onychoprion anaethetus (Scopoli, 1786)
- Least tern, Sternula antillarum Lesson, RP, 1847
- Yellow-billed tern, Sternula superciliaris (Vieillot, 1819)
- Large-billed tern, Phaetusa simplex (Gmelin, JF, 1789)
- Gull-billed tern, Gelochelidon nilotica (Gmelin, JF, 1789)
- Caspian tern, Hydroprogne caspia (Pallas, 1770)
- Inca tern, Larosterna inca (Lesson, RP & Garnot, 1827) (V) NT
- Black tern, Chlidonias niger (Linnaeus, 1758)
- White-winged tern, Chlidonias leucopterus (Temminck, 1815) (UN)(V)
- Common tern, Sterna hirundo Linnaeus, 1758
- Roseate tern, Sterna dougallii Montagu, 1813 (V)
- Arctic tern, Sterna paradisaea Pontoppidan, 1763 (V)
- South American tern, Sterna hirundinacea Lesson, RP, 1831 (U)
- Forster's tern, Sterna forsteri Nuttall, 1834 (V)
- Elegant tern, Thalasseus elegans (Gambel, 1849) NT
- Snowy-crowned tern, Sterna trudeaui Audubon, 1838 (UN)(V)
- Sandwich tern, Thalasseus sandvicensis (Latham, 1787)
- Royal tern, Thalasseus maximus (Boddaert, 1783)

== Sunbittern ==
Order: Eurypygiformes Family: Eurypygidae

The sunbittern is a bittern-like bird of tropical regions of the Americas and the sole member of the family Eurypygidae (sometimes spelled Eurypigidae) and genus Eurypyga.

- Sunbittern, Eurypyga helias (Pallas, 1781)

== Tropicbirds ==
Order: Phaethontiformes Family: Phaethontidae

Tropicbirds are slender white birds of tropical oceans, with exceptionally long central tail feathers. Their heads and long wings have black markings. Three species have been recorded in Colombia.

- Red-billed tropicbird, Phaethon aethereus Linnaeus, 1758
- Red-tailed tropicbird, Phaethon rubricauda Boddaert, 1783 (U)
- White-tailed tropicbird, Phaethon lepturus Daudin, 1802 (U)

== Penguins ==
Order: Sphenisciformes Family: Spheniscidae

The penguins are a group of aquatic, flightless birds living almost exclusively in the Southern Hemisphere. Most penguins feed on krill, fish, squid, and other forms of sealife caught while swimming underwater. Three species have been recorded in Colombia.

- Humboldt penguin, Spheniscus humboldti Meyen, 1834 (V)
- Galapagos penguin, Spheniscus mendiculus Sundevall, 1871 (U)
- Magellanic penguin, Spheniscus magellanicus (Forster, JR, 1781) (V)

== Albatrosses ==
Order: Procellariiformes Family: Diomedeidae

The albatrosses are among the largest of flying birds, and the great albatrosses from the genus Diomedea have the largest wingspans of any extant birds. Four species have been recorded in Colombia.

- Waved albatross, Phoebastria irrorata (Salvin, 1883) (V) CR
- Shy albatross, Thalassarche cauta (Gould, 1841) (UN)(V) NT
- Yellow-nosed albatross, Thalassarche chlororhynchos (Gmelin, JF, 1789)
- Black-browed albatross, Thalassarche melanophris (Temminck, 1828) (V)

== Southern storm-petrels ==
Order: Procellariiformes Family: Oceanitidae

The storm-petrels are the smallest seabirds, relatives of the petrels, feeding on planktonic crustaceans and small fish picked from the surface, typically while hovering. The flight is fluttering and sometimes bat-like. Until 2018, this family's species were included with the other storm-petrels in family Hydrobatidae. Three species have been recorded in Colombia.

- White-bellied storm-petrel, Fregetta grallaria (Vieillot, 1818) (U)
- Elliot's storm-petrel, Oceanites gracilis (Elliot, DG, 1859) DD
- White-faced storm-petrel, Pelagodroma marina (Latham, 1790) (U)

== Northern storm-petrels ==
Order: Procellariiformes Family: Hydrobatidae

Though the members of this family are similar in many respects to the southern storm-petrels, including their general appearance and habits, there are enough genetic differences to warrant their placement in a separate family. Seven species have been recorded in Colombia.

- Least storm-petrel, Hydrobates microsoma (Coues, 1864) (V)
- Wedge-rumped storm-petrel, Hydrobates tethys (Bonaparte, 1852)
- Band-rumped storm-petrel, Hydrobates castro (Harcourt, 1851) (V)
- Leach's storm-petrel, Hydrobates leucorhous (Vieillot, 1818) (V)
- Markham's storm-petrel, Hydrobates markhami (Salvin, 1883) (U) NT
- Hornby's storm-petrel, Hydrobates hornbyi (Gray, GR, 1854) (V)
- Black storm-petrel, Hydrobates melania (Bonaparte, 1854)

== Shearwaters ==
Order: Procellariiformes Family: Procellariidae

The procellariids are the main group of medium-sized "true petrels", characterized by united nostrils with medium septum and a long outer functional primary. Nineteen species have been recorded in Colombia.

- Pintado petrel, Daption capense (Linnaeus, 1758) (V)
- Gould's petrel, Pterodroma leucoptera (Gould, 1844) (U)
- Black-capped petrel, Pterodroma hasitata (Kuhl, 1820) (V)
- Galapagos petrel, Pterodroma phaeopygia (Salvin, 1876) (V) CR
- Juan Fernandez petrel, Pterodroma externa (Salvin, 1875) (U)
- Trindade petrel, Pterodroma arminjoniana (Giglioli & Salvadori, 1869) (UN)(V) VU
- White-chinned petrel, Procellaria aequinoctialis Linnaeus, 1758 (U)
- Parkinson's petrel, Procellaria parkinsoni Gray, GR, 1862 (V) VU
- Westland petrel, Procellaria westlandica Falla, 1946 (V)
- Cory's shearwater, Calonectris diomedea (Scopoli, 1769) (V)
- Wedge-tailed shearwater, Ardenna pacifica (Gmelin, JF, 1789) (V)
- Sooty shearwater, Ardenna grisea (Gmelin, JF, 1789)
- Great shearwater, Ardenna gravis O'Reilly, 1818 (V)
- Pink-footed shearwater, Ardenna creatopus (Coues, 1864) (V) VU
- Manx shearwater, Puffinus puffinus (Brünnich, 1764) (U)
- Christmas shearwater, Puffinus nativitatis Streets, 1877 (V) (Note: This observation was more than 200 miles offshore, so the SACC list will not include it.)
- Little shearwater, Puffinus assimilis Gould, 1838 (UN)(V)
- Galapagos shearwater, Puffinus subalaris Ridgway, 1897 (V)
- Audubon's shearwater, Puffinus lherminieri Lesson, RP, 1839

== Storks ==
Order: Ciconiiformes Family: Ciconiidae

Storks are large, long-legged, long-necked wading birds with long, stout bills. Storks are mute, but bill-clattering is an important mode of communication at the nest. Their nests can be large and may be reused for many years. Many species are migratory. Three species have been recorded in Colombia.

- Maguari stork, Ciconia maguari (Gmelin, JF, 1789)
- Jabiru, Jabiru mycteria (Lichtenstein, MHC, 1819)
- Wood stork, Mycteria americana Linnaeus, 1758

== Frigatebirds ==
Order: Suliformes Family: Fregatidae

Frigatebirds are large seabirds usually found over tropical oceans. They are large, black-and-white, or completely black, with long wings and deeply forked tails. The males have colored inflatable throat pouches. They do not swim or walk and cannot take off from a flat surface. Having the largest wingspan-to-body-weight ratio of any bird, they are essentially aerial, able to stay aloft for more than a week. Two species have been recorded in Colombia.

- Magnificent frigatebird, Fregata magnificens Mathews, 1914
- Great frigatebird, Fregata minor (Gmelin, JF, 1789)

== Boobies ==
Order: Suliformes Family: Sulidae

The sulids comprise the gannets and boobies. Both groups are medium to large coastal seabirds that plunge-dive for fish. Seven species have been recorded in Colombia.

- Blue-footed booby, Sula nebouxii Milne-Edwards, 1882
- Peruvian booby, Sula variegata (Tschudi, 1843) (V)
- Masked booby, Sula dactylatra Lesson, RP, 1831
- Nazca booby, Sula granti Rothschild, 1902
- Red-footed booby, Sula sula (Linnaeus, 1766)
- Brown booby, Sula leucogaster (Boddaert, 1783)
- Brewster's booby, Sula brewsteri (Goss, 1888)

== Anhingas ==
Order: Suliformes Family: Anhingidae

Anhingas are often called "snake-birds" because of their long thin neck, which gives a snake-like appearance when they swim with their bodies submerged. The males have black and dark-brown plumage, an erectile crest on the nape, and a larger bill than the female. The females have much paler plumage especially on the neck and underparts. The anhingas have completely webbed feet and their legs are short and set far back on the body. Their plumage is somewhat permeable, like that of cormorants, and they spread their wings to dry after diving. One species has been recorded in Colombia.

- Anhinga, Anhinga anhinga (Linnaeus, 1766)

== Cormorants ==
Order: Suliformes Family: Phalacrocoracidae

Phalacrocoracidae is a family of medium to large coastal, fish-eating seabirds that includes cormorants and shags. Plumage coloration varies, with the majority having mainly dark plumage, some species being black-and-white, and a few being colorful. Three species have been recorded in Colombia.

- Neotropic cormorant, Phalacrocorax brasilianus
- Guanay cormorant, Phalacrocorax bougainvillii (V)
- Double-crested cormorant, Phalacrocorax auritus (SA)

== Pelicans ==
Order: Pelecaniformes Family: Pelecanidae

Pelicans are large water birds with a distinctive pouch under their beak. As with other members of the order Pelecaniformes, they have webbed feet with four toes. Two species have been recorded in Colombia.

- American white pelican, Pelecanus erythrorhynchos Gmelin, JF, 1789 (SA)
- Brown pelican, Pelecanus occidentalis Linnaeus, 1766

== Herons ==
Order: Pelecaniformes Family: Ardeidae

The family Ardeidae contains the bitterns, herons, and egrets. Herons and egrets are medium to large wading birds with long necks and legs. Bitterns tend to be shorter necked and more wary. Members of Ardeidae fly with their necks retracted, unlike other long-necked birds such as storks, ibises, and spoonbills. Twenty-five species have been recorded in Colombia.

- Rufescent tiger-heron, Tigrisoma lineatum (Boddaert, 1783)
- Bare-throated tiger-heron, Tigrisoma mexicanum Swainson, 1834
- Fasciated tiger-heron, Tigrisoma fasciatum (Such, 1825)
- Agami heron, Agamia agami (Gmelin, JF, 1789) VU
- Boat-billed heron, Cochlearius cochlearius (Linnaeus, 1766)
- Zigzag heron, Zebrilus undulatus (Gmelin, JF, 1789) NT
- Stripe-backed bittern, Ixobrychus involucris (Vieillot, 1823)
- Least bittern, Ixobrychus exilis (Gmelin, JF, 1789)
- Pinnated bittern, Botaurus pinnatus (Wagler, 1829)
- Capped heron, Pilherodius pileatus (Boddaert, 1783)
- Whistling heron, Syrigma sibilatrix (Temminck, 1824)
- Little blue heron, Egretta caerulea (Linnaeus, 1758)
- Tricolored heron, Egretta tricolor (Müller, PLS, 1776)
- Reddish egret, Egretta rufescens (Gmelin, JF, 1789) NT
- Snowy egret, Egretta thula (Molina, 1782)
- Little egret, Egretta garzetta (Linnaeus, 1766) (UN)(V)
- Yellow-crowned night-heron, Nyctanassa violacea (Linnaeus, 1758)
- Black-crowned night-heron, Nycticorax nycticorax (Linnaeus, 1758)
- Striated heron, Butorides striata (Linnaeus, 1758)
- Green heron, Butorides virescens (Linnaeus, 1758)
- Cattle egret, Ardea ibis (Linnaeus, 1758)
- Great egret, Ardea alba Linnaeus, 1758
- Gray heron, Ardea cinerea (Linnaeus, 1758) (UN)(V)
- Great blue heron, Ardea herodias Linnaeus, 1758
- Cocoi heron, Ardea cocoi Linnaeus, 1766

== Ibises ==
Order: Pelecaniformes Family: Threskiornithidae

Threskiornithidae is a family of large terrestrial and wading birds which includes the ibises and spoonbills. They have long, broad wings with 11 primary and about 20 secondary feathers. They are strong fliers and despite their size and weight, very capable soarers. Nine species have been recorded in Colombia.

- White ibis, Eudocimus albus (Linnaeus, 1758)
- Scarlet ibis, Eudocimus ruber (Linnaeus, 1758)
- Glossy ibis, Plegadis falcinellus (Linnaeus, 1766) (V)
- Sharp-tailed ibis, Cercibis oxycerca (Spix, 1825)
- Green ibis, Mesembrinibis cayennensis (Gmelin, JF, 1789)
- Bare-faced ibis, Phimosus infuscatus (Lichtenstein, MHC, 1823)
- Buff-necked ibis, Theristicus caudatus (Boddaert, 1783)
- Eurasian spoonbill, Platalea leucorodia Linnaeus, 1758 (UN)(V)
- Roseate spoonbill, Platalea ajaja Linnaeus, 1758

== New World vultures ==
Order: Cathartiformes Family: Cathartidae

The New World vultures are not closely related to Old World vultures, but superficially resemble them because of convergent evolution. Like the Old World vultures, they are scavengers. However, unlike Old World vultures, which find carcasses by sight, New World vultures have a good sense of smell with which they locate carrion. Six species have been recorded in Colombia.

- King vulture, Sarcoramphus papa (Linnaeus, 1758)
- Andean condor, Vultur gryphus Linnaeus, 1758 NT
- Black vulture, Coragyps atratus (Bechstein, 1793)
- Turkey vulture, Cathartes aura (Linnaeus, 1758)
- Lesser yellow-headed vulture, Cathartes burrovianus Cassin, 1845
- Greater yellow-headed vulture, Cathartes melambrotus Wetmore, 1964

== Osprey ==
Order: Accipitriformes Family: Pandionidae

The family Pandionidae contains only one species, the osprey. The osprey is a medium-large raptor which is a specialist fish-eater with a worldwide distribution.

- Osprey, Pandion haliaetus (Linnaeus, 1758)

== Hawks ==
Order: Accipitriformes Family: Accipitridae

Accipitridae is a family of birds of prey, which includes hawks, eagles, kites, harriers, and Old World vultures. These birds have powerful hooked beaks for tearing flesh from their prey, strong legs, powerful talons, and keen eyesight. Fifty-four species have been recorded in Colombia.

- Pearl kite, Gampsonyx swainsonii Vigors, 1825
- White-tailed kite, Elanus leucurus (Vieillot, 1818)
- Hook-billed kite, Chondrohierax uncinatus (Temminck, 1822)
- Gray-headed kite, Leptodon cayanensis (Latham, 1790)
- Swallow-tailed kite, Elanoides forficatus (Linnaeus, 1758)
- Crested eagle, Morphnus guianensis (Daudin, 1800) NT
- Harpy eagle, Harpia harpyja (Linnaeus, 1758) NT
- Golden eagle, Aquila chrysaetos (Linnaeus, 1758) (UN)(V)
- Black hawk-eagle, Spizaetus tyrannus (Wied-Neuwied, M, 1820)
- Black-and-white hawk-eagle, Spizaetus melanoleucus (Vieillot, 1816)
- Ornate hawk-eagle, Spizaetus ornatus (Daudin, 1800) NT
- Black-and-chestnut eagle, Spizaetus isidori (des Murs, 1845) EN
- Black-collared hawk, Busarellus nigricollis (Latham, 1790)
- Snail kite, Rostrhamus sociabilis (Vieillot, 1817)
- Slender-billed kite, Helicolestes hamatus (Temminck, 1821)
- Double-toothed kite, Harpagus bidentatus (Latham, 1790)
- Rufous-thighed kite, Harpagus diodon (Temminck, 1822)
- White-tailed eagle, Haliaeetus albicilla (Linnaeus, 1758) (UN)(V)
- Mississippi kite, Ictinia mississippiensis (Wilson, A, 1811)
- Plumbeous kite, Ictinia plumbea (Gmelin, JF, 1788)
- Eurasian sparrowhawk, Accipiter nisus (Linnaeus, 1758) (UN)(V)
- Gray-bellied hawk, Accipiter poliogaster (Temminck, 1824) NT
- Sharp-shinned hawk, Accipiter striatus Vieillot, 1808
- Cooper's hawk, Astur cooperii (Bonaparte, 1828)
- Bicolored hawk, Astur bicolor (Vieillot, 1817)
- Northern harrier, Circus hudsonius (Linnaeus, 1766)
- Cinereous harrier, Circus cinereus Vieillot, 1816
- Long-winged harrier, Circus buffoni (Gmelin, JF, 1788)
- Tiny hawk, Microspizias superciliosus (Linnaeus, 1766)
- Semicollared hawk, Microspizias collaris (Sclater, PL, 1860) NT
- Crane hawk, Geranospiza caerulescens (Vieillot, 1817)
- Plumbeous hawk, Cryptoleucopteryx plumbea (Salvin, 1872) VU
- Slate-colored hawk, Buteogallus schistaceus (Sundevall, 1850)
- Common black hawk, Buteogallus anthracinus (Deppe, 1830)
- Savanna hawk, Buteogallus meridionalis (Latham, 1790)
- Great black hawk, Buteogallus urubitinga (Gmelin, JF, 1788)
- Solitary eagle, Buteogallus solitarius (Tschudi, 1844) NT
- Barred hawk, Morphnarchus princeps (Sclater, PL, 1865)
- Roadside hawk, Rupornis magnirostris (Gmelin, JF, 1788)
- Harris's hawk, Parabuteo unicinctus (Temminck, 1824)
- White-rumped hawk, Parabuteo leucorrhous (Quoy & Gaimard, 1824)
- White-tailed hawk, Geranoaetus albicaudatus (Vieillot, 1816)
- Variable hawk, Geranoaetus polyosoma (Quoy & Gaimard, 1824)
- Black-chested buzzard-eagle, Geranoaetus melanoleucus (Vieillot, 1819)
- White hawk, Pseudastur albicollis (Latham, 1790)
- Semiplumbeous hawk, Leucopternis semiplumbeus Lawrence, 1861
- Black-faced hawk, Leucopternis melanops (Latham, 1790)
- Gray-lined hawk, Buteo nitidus (Latham, 1790)
- Broad-winged hawk, Buteo platypterus (Vieillot, 1823)
- White-throated hawk, Buteo albigula Philippi, 1899
- Short-tailed hawk, Buteo brachyurus Vieillot, 1816
- Swainson's hawk, Buteo swainsoni Bonaparte, 1838
- Zone-tailed hawk, Buteo albonotatus Kaup, 1847
- Red-tailed hawk, Buteo jamaicensis (Gmelin, JF, 1788) (V)

== Barn owls ==
Order: Strigiformes Family: Tytonidae

Barn owls are medium to large owls with large heads and characteristic heart-shaped faces. They have long strong legs with powerful talons. One species has been recorded in Colombia.

- American barn owl, Tyto furcata (Temminck, 1827)

== Owls ==
Order: Strigiformes Family: Strigidae

The typical owls are small to large solitary nocturnal birds of prey. They have large forward-facing eyes and ears, a hawk-like beak and a conspicuous circle of feathers around each eye called a facial disk. Twenty-seven species have been recorded in Colombia.

- Bare-shanked screech-owl, Megascops clarkii (Kelso, L & Kelso, EH, 1935)
- White-throated screech-owl, Megascops albogularis (Cassin, 1849)
- Tropical screech-owl, Megascops choliba (Vieillot, 1817)
- Rufescent screech-owl, Megascops ingens (Salvin, 1897)
- Cinnamon screech-owl, Megascops petersoni (Fitzpatrick & O'Neill, 1986)
- Choco screech-owl, Megascops centralis (Hekstra, 1982)
- Foothill screech-owl, Megascops roraimae (Salvin, 1897)
- Santa Marta screech-owl, Megascops gilesi Krabbe, 2017 (E) VU
- Tawny-bellied screech-owl, Megascops watsonii (Cassin, 1849)
- Crested owl, Lophostrix cristata (Daudin, 1800)
- Spectacled owl, Pulsatrix perspicillata (Latham, 1790)
- Band-bellied owl, Pulsatrix melanota (Tschudi, 1844)
- Paramo horned owl, Bubo nigrescens Berlepsch, 1884
- Tropical horned owl, Bubo nacurutu (Vieillot, 1817)
- Mottled owl, Strix virgata (Cassin, 1849)
- Black-and-white owl, Strix nigrolineata (Sclater, PL, 1859)
- Black-banded owl, Strix huhula Daudin, 1800
- Rufous-banded owl, Strix albitarsis (Bonaparte, 1850)
- Cloud-forest pygmy-owl, Glaucidium nubicola Robbins & Stiles, 1999 VU
- Andean pygmy-owl, Glaucidium jardinii (Bonaparte, 1855)
- Subtropical pygmy-owl, Glaucidium parkeri Robbins & Howell, SNG, 1995
- Central American pygmy-owl, Glaucidium griseiceps Sharpe, 1875
- Ferruginous pygmy-owl, Glaucidium brasilianum (Gmelin, JF, 1788)
- Burrowing owl, Athene cunicularia (Molina, 1782)
- Buff-fronted owl, Aegolius harrisii (Cassin, 1849)
- Striped owl, Asio clamator (Vieillot, 1808)
- Stygian owl, Asio stygius (Wagler, 1832)
- Short-eared owl, Asio flammeus (Pontoppidan, 1763)

== Trogons ==
Order: Trogoniformes Family: Trogonidae

The family Trogonidae includes trogons and quetzals. Found in tropical woodlands worldwide, they feed on insects and fruit, and their broad bills and weak legs reflect their diet and arboreal habits. Although their flight is fast, they are reluctant to fly any distance. Trogons have soft, often colorful, feathers with distinctive male and female plumage. Seventeen species have been recorded in Colombia, the largest number in any country.

- Pavonine quetzal, Pharomachrus pavoninus (Spix, 1824)
- Golden-headed quetzal, Pharomachrus auriceps (Gould, 1842)
- White-tipped quetzal, Pharomachrus fulgidus (Gould, 1838)
- Crested quetzal, Pharomachrus antisianus (d'Orbigny, 1837)
- Slaty-tailed trogon, Trogon massena Gould, 1838
- Blue-tailed trogon, Trogon comptus Zimmer, JT, 1948
- Black-tailed trogon, Trogon melanurus Swainson, 1838
- White-tailed trogon, Trogon chionurus Sclater, PL & Salvin, 1871
- Green-backed trogon, Trogon viridis Linnaeus, 1766
- Gartered violaceous-trogon, Trogon caligatus Gould, 1838
- Amazonian violaceous-trogon, Trogon ramonianus Deville & des Murs, 1849
- Blue-crowned trogon, Trogon curucui Linnaeus, 1766
- Graceful black-throated trogon, Trogon tenellus Cabanis, 1862
- Kerr's black-throated trogon, Trogon cupreicauda (Chapman, 1914)
- Amazonian black-throated trogon, Trogon rufus Gmelin, JF, 1788
- Collared trogon, Trogon collaris Vieillot, 1817
- Masked trogon, Trogon personatus Gould, 1842

== Motmots ==
Order: Coraciiformes Family: Momotidae

The motmots have colorful plumage and long, graduated tails which they display by waggling back and forth. In most of the species, the barbs near the ends of the two longest (central) tail feathers are weak and fall off, leaving a length of bare shaft and creating a racket-shaped tail. Six species have been recorded in Colombia.

- Tody motmot, Hylomanes momotula Lichtenstein, MHC, 1839
- Broad-billed motmot, Electron platyrhynchum (Leadbeater, 1829)
- Rufous motmot, Baryphthengus martii (Spix, 1824)
- Whooping motmot, Momotus subrufescens Sclater, PL, 1853
- Amazonian motmot, Momotus momota (Linnaeus, 1766)
- Andean motmot, Momotus aequatorialis Gould, 1858

== Kingfishers ==
Order: Coraciiformes Family: Alcedinidae

Kingfishers are medium-sized birds with large heads, long, pointed bills, short legs, and stubby tails. Six species have been recorded in Colombia.

- Ringed kingfisher, Megaceryle torquata (Linnaeus, 1766)
- Belted kingfisher, Megaceryle alcyon (Linnaeus, 1758)
- Amazon kingfisher, Chloroceryle amazona (Latham, 1790)
- American pygmy kingfisher, Chloroceryle aenea (Pallas, 1764)
- Green kingfisher, Chloroceryle americana (Gmelin, JF, 1788)
- Green-and-rufous kingfisher, Chloroceryle inda (Linnaeus, 1766)

== Jacamars ==
Order: Galbuliformes Family: Galbulidae

The jacamars are near passerine birds from tropical South America, with a range that extends up to Mexico. They feed on insects caught on the wing, and are glossy, elegant birds with long bills and tails. In appearance and behavior they resemble the Old World bee-eaters, although they are more closely related to puffbirds. Thirteen species have been recorded in Colombia.

- White-eared jacamar, Galbalcyrhynchus leucotis des Murs, 1845
- Brown jacamar, Brachygalba lugubris (Swainson, 1838)
- Pale-headed jacamar, Brachygalba goeringi Sclater, PL & Salvin, 1869
- Dusky-backed jacamar, Brachygalba salmoni Sclater, PL & Salvin, 1879
- Yellow-billed jacamar, Galbula albirostris Latham, 1790
- Rufous-tailed jacamar, Galbula ruficauda Cuvier, 1816
- Green-tailed jacamar, Galbula galbula (Linnaeus, 1766)
- White-chinned jacamar, Galbula tombacea Spix, 1824
- Coppery-chested jacamar, Galbula pastazae Taczanowski & Berlepsch, 1885 NT
- Purplish jacamar, Galbula chalcothorax Sclater, PL, 1855
- Bronzy jacamar, Galbula leucogastra Vieillot, 1817
- Paradise jacamar, Galbula dea (Linnaeus, 1758)
- Great jacamar, Jacamerops aureus (Müller, PLS, 1776)

== Puffbirds ==
Order: Galbuliformes Family: Bucconidae

The puffbirds are related to the jacamars and have the same range, but lack the iridescent colors of that family. They are mainly brown, rufous, or gray, with large heads and flattened bills with hooked tips. The loose abundant plumage and short tails makes them look stout and puffy, giving rise to the English common name of the family. Twenty-five species have been recorded in Colombia.

- White-necked puffbird, Notharchus hyperrhynchus (Sclater, PL, 1856)
- Black-breasted puffbird, Notharchus pectoralis (Gray, GR, 1846)
- Brown-banded puffbird, Notharchus ordii (Cassin, 1851)
- Pied puffbird, Notharchus tectus (Boddaert, 1783)
- Chestnut-capped puffbird, Bucco macrodactylus (Spix, 1824)
- Spotted puffbird, Bucco tamatia Gmelin, JF, 1788
- Sooty-capped puffbird, Bucco noanamae Hellmayr, 1909 (E) NT
- Collared puffbird, Bucco capensis Linnaeus, 1766
- Barred puffbird, Nystalus radiatus (Sclater, PL, 1854)
- Western striolated-puffbird, Nystalus obamai Whitney, Piacentini, Schunck, Aleixo, de Sousa, BRS, Silveira & Rêgo, MA, 2013
- Russet-throated puffbird, Hypnelus ruficollis (Wagler, 1829)
- White-chested puffbird, Malacoptila fusca (Gmelin, JF, 1788)
- White-whiskered puffbird, Malacoptila panamensis Lafresnaye, 1847
- Black-streaked puffbird, Malacoptila fulvogularis Sclater, PL, 1854
- Moustached puffbird, Malacoptila mystacalis (Lafresnaye, 1850)
- Lanceolated monklet, Micromonacha lanceolata (Deville, 1849)
- Rusty-breasted nunlet, Nonnula rubecula (Spix, 1824)
- Brown nunlet, Nonnula brunnea Sclater, PL, 1881
- Gray-cheeked nunlet, Nonnula frontalis (Sclater, PL, 1854)
- Rufous-capped nunlet, Nonnula ruficapilla (Tschudi, 1844)
- White-faced nunbird, Hapaloptila castanea (Verreaux, J, 1866)
- Black-fronted nunbird, Monasa nigrifrons (Spix, 1824)
- White-fronted nunbird, Monasa morphoeus (Hahn & Küster, 1823)
- Yellow-billed nunbird, Monasa flavirostris Strickland, 1850
- Swallow-winged puffbird, Chelidoptera tenebrosa (Pallas, 1782)

== New World barbets ==
Order: Piciformes Family: Capitonidae

The barbets are plump birds with short necks and large heads. They get their name from the bristles which fringe their heavy bills. Most species are brightly colored. Eight species have been recorded in Colombia.

- Scarlet-crowned barbet, Capito aurovirens (Cuvier, 1829)
- Spot-crowned barbet, Capito maculicoronatus Lawrence, 1861
- Orange-fronted barbet, Capito squamatus Salvin, 1876 NT
- White-mantled barbet, Capito hypoleucus Salvin, 1897 (E) VU
- Five-colored barbet, Capito quinticolor Elliot, DG, 1865 VU
- Gilded barbet, Capito auratus (Dumont, 1805)
- Lemon-throated barbet, Eubucco richardsoni (Gray, GR, 1846)
- Red-headed barbet, Eubucco bourcierii (Lafresnaye, 1845)

== Toucan-barbets ==
Order: Piciformes Family: Semnornithidae

The toucan-barbets are birds of montane forests in the Neotropics. They are highly social and non-migratory.

- Toucan barbet, Semnornis ramphastinus (Jardine, 1855) NT

== Toucans ==
Order: Piciformes Family: Ramphastidae

Toucans are near passerine birds from the Neotropics. They are brightly marked and have enormous colorful bills which in some species amount to half their body length. Twenty species have been recorded in Colombia, the largest number of toucans of any country.

- Yellow-throated toucan, Ramphastos ambiguus Swainson, 1823 NT
- White-throated toucan, Ramphastos tucanus Linnaeus, 1758
- Keel-billed toucan, Ramphastos sulfuratus Lesson, RP, 1830
- Choco toucan, Ramphastos brevis Meyer de Schauensee, 1945
- Channel-billed toucan, Ramphastos vitellinus Lichtenstein, MHC, 1823 VU
- Southern emerald-toucanet, Aulacorhynchus albivitta (Boissonneau, 1840)
- Groove-billed toucanet, Aulacorhynchus sulcatus (Swainson, 1820)
- Chestnut-tipped toucanet, Aulacorhynchus derbianus Gould, 1835
- Crimson-rumped toucanet, Aulacorhynchus haematopygus (Gould, 1835)
- Gray-breasted mountain-toucan, Andigena hypoglauca (Gould, 1833) NT
- Plate-billed mountain-toucan, Andigena laminirostris Gould, 1851 NT
- Black-billed mountain-toucan, Andigena nigrirostris (Waterhouse, 1839)
- Yellow-eared toucanet, Selenidera spectabilis Cassin, 1858
- Golden-collared toucanet, Selenidera reinwardtii (Wagler, 1827)
- Tawny-tufted toucanet, Selenidera nattereri (Gould, 1835)
- Lettered aracari, Pteroglossus inscriptus Swainson, 1822
- Collared aracari, Pteroglossus torquatus (Gmelin, JF, 1788)
- Chestnut-eared aracari, Pteroglossus castanotis Gould, 1834
- Many-banded aracari, Pteroglossus pluricinctus Gould, 1835
- Ivory-billed aracari, Pteroglossus azara (Vieillot, 1819)

== Woodpeckers ==
Order: Piciformes Family: Picidae

Woodpeckers are small to medium-sized birds with chisel-like beaks, short legs, stiff tails, and long tongues used for capturing insects. Some species have feet with two toes pointing forward and two backward, while several species have only three toes. Many woodpeckers have the habit of tapping noisily on tree trunks with their beaks. Forty-five species have been recorded in Colombia.

- Eurasian wryneck, Jynx torquilla Linnaeus, 1758 (UN)(V)
- Bar-breasted piculet, Picumnus aurifrons Pelzeln, 1870
- Orinoco piculet, Picumnus pumilus Cabanis & Heine, 1863
- Lafresnaye's piculet, Picumnus lafresnayi Malherbe, 1862
- Golden-spangled piculet, Picumnus exilis (Lichtenstein, MHC, 1823)
- Scaled piculet, Picumnus squamulatus Lafresnaye, 1854
- White-bellied piculet, Picumnus spilogaster Sundevall, 1834
- Rufous-breasted piculet, Picumnus rufiventris (Bonaparte, 1838)
- Plain-breasted piculet, Picumnus castelnau Malherbe, 1862
- Olivaceous piculet, Picumnus olivaceus Lafresnaye, 1845
- Grayish piculet, Picumnus granadensis Lafresnaye, 1847 (E)
- Chestnut piculet, Picumnus cinnamomeus Wagler, 1829
- Yellow-bellied sapsucker, Sphyrapicus varius (Linnaeus, 1766)
- Acorn woodpecker, Melanerpes formicivorus (Swainson, 1827)
- Yellow-tufted woodpecker, Melanerpes cruentatus (Boddaert, 1783)
- Beautiful woodpecker, Melanerpes pulcher Sclater, PL, 1870 (E)
- Black-cheeked woodpecker, Melanerpes pucherani (Malherbe, 1849)
- Red-crowned woodpecker, Melanerpes rubricapillus (Cabanis, 1862)
- Smoky-brown woodpecker, Dryobates fumigatus (d'Orbigny, 1840)
- Red-rumped woodpecker, Dryobates kirkii (Malherbe, 1845)
- Little woodpecker, Dryobates passerinus (Linnaeus, 1766)
- Scarlet-backed woodpecker, Dryobates callonotus (Waterhouse, 1841)
- Yellow-vented woodpecker, Dryobates dignus (Sclater, PL & Salvin, 1877)
- Bar-bellied woodpecker, Dryobates nigriceps (d'Orbigny, 1840)
- Red-stained woodpecker, Dryobates affinis (Swainson, 1821)
- Choco woodpecker, Dryobates chocoensis (Todd, 1919) NT
- Powerful woodpecker, Campephilus pollens (Bonaparte, 1845)
- Crimson-bellied woodpecker, Campephilus haematogaster (Tschudi, 1844)
- Splendid woodpecker, Campephilus splendens Hargitt, 1889 (see note) (Note: The SACC considers this entry to be a subspecies of crimson-bellied woodpecker, but it is recognized by some other authorities. The committee has not yet received a proposal for the split.) NT
- Red-necked woodpecker, Campephilus rubricollis (Boddaert, 1783)
- Crimson-crested woodpecker, Campephilus melanoleucos (Gmelin, JF, 1788)
- Guayaquil woodpecker, Campephilus gayaquilensis (Lesson, RP, 1845)
- Lineated woodpecker, Dryocopus lineatus (Linnaeus, 1766)
- Cinnamon woodpecker, Celeus loricatus (Reichenbach, 1854)
- Ringed woodpecker, Celeus torquatus (Boddaert, 1783)
- Variable woodpecker, Celeus undatus (Linnaeus, 1766)
- Cream-colored woodpecker, Celeus flavus (Müller, PLS, 1776)
- Rufous-headed woodpecker, Celeus spectabilis Sclater, PL & Salvin, 1880
- Chestnut woodpecker, Celeus elegans (Müller, PLS, 1776)
- White-throated woodpecker, Piculus leucolaemus (Natterer & Malherbe, 1845)
- Lita woodpecker, Piculus litae (Rothschild, 1901)
- Yellow-throated woodpecker, Piculus flavigula (Boddaert, 1783)
- Golden-green woodpecker, Piculus chrysochloros (Vieillot, 1818)
- Golden-olive woodpecker, Colaptes rubiginosus (Swainson, 1820)
- Crimson-mantled woodpecker, Colaptes rivolii (Boissonneau, 1840)
- Spot-breasted woodpecker, Colaptes punctigula (Boddaert, 1783)

== Falcons ==
Order: Falconiformes Family: Falconidae

Falconidae is a family of diurnal birds of prey. They differ from hawks, eagles, and kites in that they kill with their beaks instead of their talons. Nineteen species have been recorded in Colombia.

- Laughing falcon, Herpetotheres cachinnans (Linnaeus, 1758)
- Barred forest-falcon, Micrastur ruficollis (Vieillot, 1817)
- Plumbeous forest-falcon, Micrastur plumbeus Sclater, WL, 1918 VU
- Lined forest-falcon, Micrastur gilvicollis (Vieillot, 1817)
- Slaty-backed forest-falcon, Micrastur mirandollei (Schlegel, 1862)
- Collared forest-falcon, Micrastur semitorquatus (Vieillot, 1817)
- Buckley's forest-falcon, Micrastur buckleyi Swann, 1919 (U)
- Crested caracara, Caracara plancus (Miller, JF, 1777)
- Red-throated caracara, Ibycter americanus (Boddaert, 1783)
- Carunculated caracara, Phalcoboenus carunculatus des Murs, 1853
- Black caracara, Daptrius ater Vieillot, 1816
- Yellow-headed caracara, Milvago chimachima (Vieillot, 1816)
- Eurasian kestrel, Falco tinnunculus Linnaeus, 1758 (UN)(V)
- American kestrel, Falco sparverius Linnaeus, 1758
- Merlin, Falco columbarius Linnaeus, 1758
- Bat falcon, Falco rufigularis Daudin, 1800
- Orange-breasted falcon, Falco deiroleucus Temminck, 1825 NT
- Aplomado falcon, Falco femoralis Temminck, 1822
- Peregrine falcon, Falco peregrinus Tunstall, 1771

== New World and African parrots ==
Order: Psittaciformes Family: Psittacidae

Parrots are small to large birds with a characteristic curved beak. Their upper mandibles have slight mobility in the joint with the skull and they have a generally erect stance. All parrots are zygodactyl, having the four toes on each foot placed two at the front and two to the back. Fifty-seven species have been recorded in Colombia.

- Lilac-tailed parrotlet, Touit batavicus (Boddaert, 1783)
- Scarlet-shouldered parrotlet, Touit huetii (Temminck, 1830) VU
- Blue-fronted parrotlet, Touit dilectissimus (Sclater, PL & Salvin, 1871)
- Sapphire-rumped parrotlet, Touit purpuratus (Gmelin, JF, 1788)
- Spot-winged parrotlet, Touit stictopterus (Sclater, PL, 1862) VU
- Barred parakeet, Bolborhynchus lineola (Cassin, 1853)
- Rufous-fronted parakeet, Bolborhynchus ferrugineifrons (Lawrence, 1880) (E) VU
- Tui parakeet, Brotogeris sanctithomae (Müller, PLS, 1776)
- Canary-winged parakeet, Brotogeris versicolurus (Müller, PLS, 1776)
- Orange-chinned parakeet, Brotogeris jugularis (Müller, PLS, 1776)
- Cobalt-winged parakeet, Brotogeris cyanoptera (Pelzeln, 1870)
- Rusty-faced parrot, Hapalopsittaca amazonina (des Murs, 1845) VU
- Indigo-winged parrot, Hapalopsittaca fuertesi (Chapman, 1912) (E) CR
- Brown-hooded parrot, Pyrilia haematotis (Sclater, PL & Salvin, 1860)
- Rose-faced parrot, Pyrilia pulchra (Berlepsch, 1897)
- Saffron-headed parrot, Pyrilia pyrilia (Bonaparte, 1853) NT
- Orange-cheeked parrot, Pyrilia barrabandi (Kuhl, 1820) NT
- Dusky parrot, Pionus fuscus (Müller, PLS, 1776)
- Red-billed parrot, Pionus sordidus (Linnaeus, 1758)
- Speckle-faced parrot, Pionus tumultuosus (Tschudi, 1844)
- Blue-headed parrot, Pionus menstruus (Linnaeus, 1766)
- Bronze-winged parrot, Pionus chalcopterus (Fraser, 1841)
- Short-tailed parrot, Graydidascalus brachyurus (Temminck & Kuhl, 1820)
- Festive amazon, Amazona festiva (Linnaeus, 1758) NT
- Red-lored amazon, Amazona autumnalis (Linnaeus, 1758)
- Yellow-crowned amazon, Amazona ochrocephala (Gmelin, JF, 1788)
- Mealy amazon, Amazona farinosa (Boddaert, 1783) NT
- Kawall's amazon, Amazona kawalli Grantsau & Camargo, 1989
- Orange-winged amazon, Amazona amazonica (Linnaeus, 1766)
- Scaly-naped amazon, Amazona mercenarius (Tschudi, 1844)
- Dusky-billed parrotlet, Forpus modestus (Cabanis, 1849)
- Riparian parrotlet, Forpus crassirostris (Taczanowski, 1883)
- Spectacled parrotlet, Forpus conspicillatus (Lafresnaye, 1848)
- Pacific parrotlet, Forpus coelestis (Lesson, RP, 1847)
- Green-rumped parrotlet, Forpus passerinus (Linnaeus, 1758)
- Turquoise-winged parrotlet, Forpus spengeli (Hartlaub, 1885) (E)
- Black-headed parrot, Pionites melanocephalus (Linnaeus, 1758)
- White-bellied parrot, Pionites leucogaster (Kuhl, 1820)
- Red-fan parrot, Deroptyus accipitrinus (Linnaeus, 1758)
- Painted parakeet, Pyrrhura picta (Müller, PLS, 1776)
- Sinu parakeet, Pyrrhura subandina (E) (see note) (Note: The SACC considers this entry to be a subspecies of painted parakeet, but it is recognized by some other authorities. The committee has not yet received a proposal for the split.) NT CR
- Perija parakeet, Pyrrhura caeruleiceps (E) (see note) (Note: The SACC considers this entry to be a subspecies of painted parakeet, but it is recognized by some other authorities. The committee has not yet received a proposal for the split.) NT EN
- Santa Marta parakeet, Pyrrhura viridicata Todd, 1913 (E) EN
- Maroon-tailed parakeet, Pyrrhura melanura (Spix, 1824)
- Upper Magdalena parakeet, Pyrrhura chapmani (E) (see note) (Note: The SACC considers this entry to be a subspecies of maroon-tailed parakeet, but it is recognized by some other authorities. The committee has not yet received a proposal for the split.) NT VU
- Brown-breasted parakeet, Pyrrhura calliptera (Massena & Souancé, 1854) (E) VU
- Brown-throated parakeet, Eupsittula pertinax (Linnaeus, 1758)
- Dusky-headed parakeet, Aratinga weddellii (Deville, 1851)
- Red-bellied macaw, Orthopsittaca manilatus (Boddaert, 1783)
- Blue-and-yellow macaw, Ara ararauna (Linnaeus, 1758)
- Chestnut-fronted macaw, Ara severus (Linnaeus, 1758)
- Military macaw, Ara militaris (Linnaeus, 1766) VU
- Great green macaw, Ara ambiguus (Bechstein, 1811) EN
- Scarlet macaw, Ara macao (Linnaeus, 1758)
- Red-and-green macaw, Ara chloropterus Gray, GR, 1859
- Golden-plumed parakeet, Leptosittaca branickii Berlepsch & Stolzmann, 1894 VU
- Yellow-eared parrot, Ognorhynchus icterotis (Massena & Souancé, 1854) EN
- Blue-crowned parakeet, Thectocercus acuticaudatus (Vieillot, 1818)
- Scarlet-fronted parakeet, Psittacara wagleri (Gray, GR, 1845) NT
- White-eyed parakeet, Psittacara leucophthalmus (Müller, PLS, 1776)

== Sapayoa ==
Order: Passeriformes Family: Sapayoidae

The sapayoa is the only member of its family, and is found in the lowland rainforests of Panama and north-western South America. It is usually seen in pairs or mixed-species flocks.

- Sapayoa, Sapayoa aenigma Hartert, EJO, 1903 (Donegan calls this species broad-billed sapayoa)

== Antbirds ==
Order: Passeriformes Family: Thamnophilidae

The antbirds are a large family of small passerine birds of subtropical and tropical Central and South America. They are forest birds which tend to feed on insects at or near the ground. A sizable minority of them specialize in following columns of army ants to eat small invertebrates that leave their hiding places to flee from the ants. Many species lack bright color, with brown, black, and white being the dominant tones. One hundred fifteen species have been recorded in Colombia.

- Rufous-rumped antwren, Euchrepomis callinota (Sclater, PL, 1855)
- Ash-winged antwren, Euchrepomis spodioptila (Sclater, PL & Salvin, 1881)
- Fasciated antshrike, Cymbilaimus lineatus (Leach, 1814)
- Fulvous antshrike, Frederickena fulva Zimmer, JT, 1944
- Great antshrike, Taraba major (Vieillot, 1816)
- Black-crested antshrike, Sakesphorus canadensis (Linnaeus, 1766)
- Barred antshrike, Thamnophilus doliatus (Linnaeus, 1764)
- Bar-crested antshrike, Thamnophilus multistriatus Lafresnaye, 1844
- Lined antshrike, Thamnophilus tenuepunctatus Lafresnaye, 1853
- Chestnut-backed antshrike, Thamnophilus palliatus (Lichtenstein, MHC, 1823)
- Black-crowned antshrike, Thamnophilus atrinucha Salvin & Godman, 1892
- Plain-winged antshrike, Thamnophilus schistaceus d'Orbigny, 1837
- Mouse-colored antshrike, Thamnophilus murinus Sclater, PL & Salvin, 1868
- Black antshrike, Thamnophilus nigriceps Sclater, PL, 1869
- Cocha antshrike, Thamnophilus praecox Zimmer, JT, 1937 NT
- Castelnau's antshrike, Thamnophilus cryptoleucus (Ménégaux & Hellmayr, 1906)
- Blackish-gray antshrike, Thamnophilus nigrocinereus Sclater, PL, 1855
- Northern slaty-antshrike, Thamnophilus punctatus (Shaw, 1809)
- Uniform antshrike, Thamnophilus unicolor (Sclater, PL, 1859)
- White-shouldered antshrike, Thamnophilus aethiops Sclater, PL, 1858
- Black-backed antshrike, Thamnophilus melanonotus Sclater, PL, 1855
- Amazonian antshrike, Thamnophilus amazonicus Sclater, PL, 1858
- Pearly antshrike, Megastictus margaritatus (Sclater, PL, 1855)
- Black bushbird, Neoctantes niger (Pelzeln, 1859)
- Recurve-billed bushbird, Clytoctantes alixii Elliot, DG, 1870 EN
- Russet antshrike, Thamnistes anabatinus Sclater, PL & Salvin, 1860
- Plain antvireo, Dysithamnus mentalis (Temminck, 1823)
- Spot-crowned antvireo, Dysithamnus puncticeps Salvin, 1866
- Bicolored antvireo, Dysithamnus occidentalis (Chapman, 1923) NT
- White-streaked antvireo, Dysithamnus leucostictus Sclater, PL, 1858
- Dugand's antwren, Herpsilochmus dugandi Meyer de Schauensee, 1945
- Spot-backed antwren, Herpsilochmus dorsimaculatus Pelzeln, 1868
- Yellow-breasted antwren, Herpsilochmus axillaris (Tschudi, 1844)
- Dusky-throated antshrike, Thamnomanes ardesiacus (Sclater, PL & Salvin, 1868)
- Cinereous antshrike, Thamnomanes caesius (Temminck, 1820)
- Spiny-faced antshrike, Xenornis setifrons Chapman, 1924 NT
- Plain-throated antwren, Isleria hauxwelli (Sclater, PL, 1857)
- Spot-winged antshrike, Pygiptila stellaris (Spix, 1825)
- Checker-throated stipplethroat, Epinecrophylla fulviventris (Lawrence, 1862)
- Ornate stipplethroat, Epinecrophylla ornata (Sclater, PL, 1853)
- Rufous-tailed stipplethroat, Epinecrophylla erythrura (Sclater, PL, 1890)
- Rufous-backed stipplethroat, Epinecrophylla haematonota (Sclater, PL, 1857)
- Foothill stipplethroat, Epinecrophylla spodionota (Sclater, PL & Salvin, 1880)
- Pygmy antwren, Myrmotherula brachyura (Hermann, 1783)
- Moustached antwren, Myrmotherula ignota Griscom, 1929
- Yellow-throated antwren, Myrmotherula ambigua Zimmer, JT, 1932
- Guianan streaked-antwren, Myrmotherula surinamensis (Gmelin, JF, 1788)
- Amazonian streaked-antwren, Myrmotherula multostriata Sclater, PL, 1858
- Pacific antwren, Myrmotherula pacifica Hellmayr, 1911
- Cherrie's antwren, Myrmotherula cherriei Berlepsch & Hartert, EJO, 1902
- Stripe-chested antwren, Myrmotherula longicauda Berlepsch & Stolzmann, 1894
- White-flanked antwren, Myrmotherula axillaris (Vieillot, 1817)
- Slaty antwren, Myrmotherula schisticolor (Lawrence, 1865)
- Rio Suno antwren, Myrmotherula sunensis Chapman, 1925
- Long-winged antwren, Myrmotherula longipennis Pelzeln, 1868
- Plain-winged antwren, Myrmotherula behni Berlepsch & Leverkühn, 1890
- Gray antwren, Myrmotherula menetriesii (d'Orbigny, 1837)
- Leaden antwren, Myrmotherula assimilis Pelzeln, 1868
- Banded antbird, Dichrozona cincta (Pelzeln, 1868)
- Dot-winged antwren, Microrhopias quixensis (Cornalia, 1849)
- White-fringed antwren, Formicivora grisea (Boddaert, 1783)
- Striated antbird, Drymophila devillei (Ménégaux & Hellmayr, 1906)
- Santa Marta antbird, Drymophila hellmayri Todd, 1915 (E) NT
- Klages's antbird, Drymophila klagesi Hellmayr & Seilern, 1912
- East Andean antbird, Drymophila caudata (Sclater, PL, 1855) (E)
- Streak-headed antbird, Drymophila striaticeps Chapman, 1912
- Imeri warbling-antbird, Hypocnemis flavescens Sclater, PL, 1865
- Peruvian warbling-antbird, Hypocnemis peruviana Taczanowski, 1884
- Yellow-browed antbird, Hypocnemis hypoxantha Sclater, PL, 1869
- Parker's antbird, Cercomacroides parkeri (Graves, GR, 1997) (E)
- Dusky antbird, Cercomacroides tyrannina (Sclater, PL, 1855)
- Black antbird, Cercomacroides serva (Sclater, PL, 1858)
- Blackish antbird, Cercomacroides nigrescens (Cabanis & Heine, 1860)
- Riparian antbird, Cercomacroides fuscicauda (Zimmer, JT, 1931)
- Gray antbird, Cercomacra cinerascens (Sclater, PL, 1857)
- Jet antbird, Cercomacra nigricans Sclater, PL, 1858
- Western fire-eye, Pyriglena maura (Ménétriés, 1835)
- White-browed antbird, Myrmoborus leucophrys (Tschudi, 1844)
- Ash-breasted antbird, Myrmoborus lugubris (Cabanis, 1847)
- Black-faced antbird, Myrmoborus myotherinus (Spix, 1825)
- Black-tailed antbird, Myrmoborus melanurus (Sclater, PL & Salvin, 1866) (V) NT (see note) (Note: The SACC has not received a proposal to include this species.)
- Black-chinned antbird, Hypocnemoides melanopogon (Sclater, PL, 1857)
- Band-tailed antbird, Hypocnemoides maculicauda (Pelzeln, 1868)
- Black-and-white antbird, Myrmochanes hemileucus (Sclater, PL & Salvin, 1866)
- Bare-crowned antbird, Gymnocichla nudiceps (Cassin, 1850)
- Silvered antbird, Sclateria naevia (Gmelin, JF, 1788)
- Black-headed antbird, Percnostola rufifrons (Gmelin, JF, 1789)
- Slate-colored antbird, Myrmelastes schistaceus (Sclater, PL, 1858)
- Plumbeous antbird, Myrmelastes hyperythrus (Sclater, PL, 1855)
- Spot-winged antbird, Myrmelastes leucostigma (Pelzeln, 1868)
- White-bellied antbird, Myrmeciza longipes (Swainson, 1825)
- Chestnut-backed antbird, Poliocrania exsul (Sclater, PL, 1859)
- Dull-mantled antbird, Sipia laemosticta (Salvin, 1865)
- Magdalena antbird, Sipia palliata (Todd, 1917) NT
- Esmeraldas antbird, Sipia nigricauda (Salvin & Godman, 1892)
- Stub-tailed antbird, Sipia berlepschi (Hartert, EJO, 1898)
- Chestnut-tailed antbird, Sciaphylax hemimelaena (Sclater, PL, 1857)
- Zimmer's antbird, Sciaphylax castanea (Zimmer JT, 1932)
- White-shouldered antbird, Akletos melanoceps (Spix, 1825)
- Sooty antbird, Hafferia fortis (Sclater, PL & Salvin, 1868)
- Zeledon's antbird, Hafferia zeledoni (Ridgway, 1909)
- Blue-lored antbird, Hafferia immaculata (Lafresnaye, 1845)
- Yapacana antbird, Aprositornis disjuncta (Friedmann, 1945)
- Black-throated antbird, Myrmophylax atrothorax (Boddaert, 1783)
- Gray-bellied antbird, Ammonastes pelzelni (Sclater, PL, 1890)
- Wing-banded antbird, Myrmornis torquata (Boddaert, 1783)
- White-plumed antbird, Pithys albifrons (Linnaeus, 1766)
- Bicolored antbird, Gymnopithys bicolor (Lawrence, 1863)
- White-cheeked antbird, Gymnopithys leucaspis (Sclater, PL, 1855)
- Chestnut-crested antbird, Rhegmatorhina cristata (Pelzeln, 1868)
- Hairy-crested antbird, Rhegmatorhina melanosticta (Sclater, PL & Salvin, 1880)
- Spotted antbird, Hylophylax naevioides (Lafresnaye, 1847)
- Spot-backed antbird, Hylophylax naevius (Gmelin, JF, 1789)
- Dot-backed antbird, Hylophylax punctulatus (des Murs, 1856)
- Common scale-backed antbird, Willisornis poecilinotus (Cabanis, 1847)
- Black-spotted bare-eye, Phlegopsis nigromaculata (d'Orbigny & Lafresnaye, 1837)
- Reddish-winged bare-eye, Phlegopsis erythroptera (Gould, 1855)
- Ocellated antbird, Phaenostictus mcleannani (Lawrence, 1860)

== Gnateaters ==
Order: Passeriformes Family: Conopophagidae

The gnateaters are round, short-tailed, and long-legged birds, which are closely related to the antbirds. Four species have been recorded in Colombia.

- Black-crowned antpitta, Pittasoma michleri Cassin, 1860
- Rufous-crowned antpitta, Pittasoma rufopileatum Hartert, EJO, 1901
- Chestnut-belted gnateater, Conopophaga aurita (Gmelin, JF, 1789)
- Chestnut-crowned gnateater, Conopophaga castaneiceps Sclater, PL, 1857

== Antpittas ==
Order: Passeriformes Family: Grallariidae

Antpittas resemble the true pittas with strong, longish legs, very short tails, and stout bills. Thirty-two species have been recorded in Colombia.

- Undulated antpitta, Grallaria squamigera Prévost & des Murs, 1842
- Giant antpitta, Grallaria gigantea Lawrence, 1866
- Variegated antpitta, Grallaria varia Boddaert, 1783
- Moustached antpitta, Grallaria alleni Chapman, 1912 VU
- Scaled antpitta, Grallaria guatimalensis Prévost & des Murs, 1842
- Plain-backed antpitta, Grallaria haplonota Sclater, PL, 1877
- Ochre-striped antpitta, Grallaria dignissima Sclater, PL & Salvin, 1880
- Chestnut-crowned antpitta, Grallaria ruficapilla Lafresnaye, 1842
- Santa Marta antpitta, Grallaria bangsi Allen, JA, 1900 (E) VU
- Cundinamarca antpitta, Grallaria kaestneri Stiles, 1992 (E) EN
- Chestnut-naped antpitta, Grallaria nuchalis Sclater, PL, 1860
- Yellow-breasted antpitta, Grallaria flavotincta Sclater, PL, 1877
- White-bellied antpitta, Grallaria hypoleuca Sclater, PL, 1855
- Sierra Nevada antpitta, Grallaria spatiator Bangs, 1898 (E)
- Perija antpitta, Grallaria saltuensis Wetmore, 1946 NT
- Bicolored antpitta, Grallaria rufocinerea Sclater, PL & Salvin, 1879
- Muisca antpitta, Grallaria rufula Lafresnaye, 1843
- Chami antpitta, Grallaria alvarezi Cuervo, Cadena, Isler, ML & Chesser, 2020 (E)
- Equatorial antpitta, Grallaria saturata Domaniewski & Stolzmann, 1918
- Tawny antpitta, Grallaria quitensis Lesson, RP, 1844
- Urrao antpitta, Grallaria urraoensis Carantón-Ayala & Certuche-Cubillos, 2010 (E) CR
- Brown-banded antpitta, Grallaria milleri Chapman, 1912 (E) VU
- Ochre-breasted antpitta, Grallaricula flavirostris (Sclater, PL, 1858)
- Crescent-faced antpitta, Grallaricula lineifrons (Chapman, 1924)
- Hooded antpitta, Grallaricula cucullata (Sclater, PL, 1856) NT
- Rusty-breasted antpitta, Grallaricula ferrugineipectus (Sclater, PL, 1857)
- Slate-crowned antpitta, Grallaricula nana (Lafresnaye, 1842)
- Streak-chested antpitta, Hylopezus perspicillatus (Lawrence, 1861)
- Spotted antpitta, Hylopezus macularius (Temminck, 1830)
- White-lored antpitta, Myrmothera fulviventris (Sclater, PL, 1858)
- Thicket antpitta, Myrmothera dives (Salvin, 1865)
- Thrush-like antpitta, Myrmothera campanisona (Hermann, 1783)

== Tapaculos ==
Order: Passeriformes Family: Rhinocryptidae

The tapaculos are small suboscine passeriform birds with numerous species in South and Central America. They are terrestrial species that fly only poorly on their short wings. They have strong legs, well-suited to their habitat of grassland or forest undergrowth. The tail is cocked and pointed towards the head. Nineteen species have been recorded in Colombia.

- Rusty-belted tapaculo, Liosceles thoracicus (Sclater, PL, 1865)
- Ocellated tapaculo, Acropternis orthonyx (Lafresnaye, 1843)
- Ash-colored tapaculo, Myornis senilis (Lafresnaye, 1840)
- Paramo tapaculo, Scytalopus opacus Zimmer, JT, 1941
- Paramillo tapaculo, Scytalopus canus Chapman, 1915 (E)
- White-crowned tapaculo, Scytalopus atratus Hellmayr, 1922
- Santa Marta tapaculo, Scytalopus sanctaemartae Chapman, 1915 (E)
- Long-tailed tapaculo, Scytalopus micropterus (Sclater, PL, 1858)
- Blackish tapaculo, Scytalopus latrans Hellmayr, 1924
- Nariño tapaculo, Scytalopus vicinior Zimmer, JT, 1939
- Tacarcuna tapaculo, Scytalopus panamensis Chapman, 1915
- Choco tapaculo, Scytalopus chocoensis Krabbe & Schulenberg, 1997
- Magdalena tapaculo, Scytalopus rodriguezi Krabbe, Salaman, Cortés-Diago, Quevedo, Ortega & Cadena, 2005 (E)
- Stiles's tapaculo, Scytalopus stilesi Cuervo, Cadena, Krabbe & Renjifo, 2005 (E)
- Tatama tapaculo, Scytalopus alvarezlopezi Stiles, Laverde-R, O & Cadena, 2017 (E)
- Pale-bellied tapaculo, Scytalopus griseicollis (Lafresnaye, 1840)
- Brown-rumped tapaculo, Scytalopus latebricola Bangs, 1899 (E)
- Perija tapaculo, Scytalopus perijanus Avendaño, Cuervo, López-O, Gutiérrez-Pinto, Cortés-Diago & Cadena, 2015
- Spillmann's tapaculo, Scytalopus spillmanni Stresemann, 1937

== Antthrushes ==
Order: Passeriformes Family: Formicariidae

The ground antbirds are a group comprising the antthrushes and antpittas. Antthrushes resemble small rails while antpittas resemble the true pittas with strong, longish legs, very short tails, and stout bills. Eight species have been recorded in Colombia.

- Rufous-capped antthrush, Formicarius colma Boddaert, 1783
- Black-faced antthrush, Formicarius analis (d'Orbigny & Lafresnaye, 1837)
- Black-hooded antthrush, Formicarius destructus Hartert, 1898
- Rufous-breasted antthrush, Formicarius rufipectus Salvin, 1866
- Short-tailed antthrush, Chamaeza campanisona (Lichtenstein, MHC, 1823)
- Striated antthrush, Chamaeza nobilis Gould, 1855
- Schwartz's antthrush, Chamaeza turdina Cabanis & Heine, 1860
- Barred antthrush, Chamaeza mollissima Sclater, PL, 1855

== Ovenbirds ==
Order: Passeriformes Family: Furnariidae

Ovenbirds comprise a large family of small sub-oscine passerine bird species found in Central and South America. They are a diverse group of insectivores which gets its name from the elaborate "oven-like" clay nests built by some species, although others build stick nests or nest in tunnels or clefts in rock. The woodcreepers are brownish birds which maintain an upright vertical posture, supported by their stiff tail vanes. They feed mainly on insects taken from tree trunks. One hundred thirteen species have been recorded in Colombia.

- South American leaftosser, Sclerurus obscurior Hartert, EJO, 1901
- Short-billed leaftosser, Sclerurus rufigularis Pelzeln, 1868
- Scaly-throated leaftosser, Sclerurus guatemalensis (Hartlaub, 1844)
- Black-tailed leaftosser, Sclerurus caudacutus (Vieillot, 1816)
- Gray-throated leaftosser, Sclerurus albigularis Sclater, PL & Salvin, 1869
- Spot-throated woodcreeper, Certhiasomus stictolaemus (Pelzeln, 1868)
- Olivaceous woodcreeper, Sittasomus griseicapillus (Vieillot, 1818)
- Piping long-tailed woodcreeper, Deconychura typica Cherrie, 1891
- Mournful long-tailed woodcreeper, Deconychura pallida Zimmer, JT, 1929
- Tyrannine woodcreeper, Dendrocincla tyrannina (Lafresnaye, 1851)
- White-chinned woodcreeper, Dendrocincla merula (Lichtenstein, MHC, 1820)
- Ruddy woodcreeper, Dendrocincla homochroa (Sclater, PL, 1860)
- Plain-brown woodcreeper, Dendrocincla fuliginosa (Vieillot, 1818)
- Wedge-billed woodcreeper, Glyphorynchus spirurus (Vieillot, 1819)
- Cinnamon-throated woodcreeper, Dendrexetastes rufigula (Lesson, RP, 1844)
- Long-billed woodcreeper, Nasica longirostris (Vieillot, 1818)
- Northern barred-woodcreeper, Dendrocolaptes sanctithomae (Lafresnaye, 1852)
- Amazonian barred-woodcreeper, Dendrocolaptes certhia (Boddaert, 1783)
- Black-banded woodcreeper, Dendrocolaptes picumnus Lichtenstein, MHC, 1820
- Bar-bellied woodcreeper, Hylexetastes stresemanni Snethlage, E, 1925
- Strong-billed woodcreeper, Xiphocolaptes promeropirhynchus (Lesson, RP, 1840)
- Striped woodcreeper, Xiphorhynchus obsoletus (Lichtenstein, MHC, 1820)
- Ocellated woodcreeper, Xiphorhynchus ocellatus (Spix, 1824)
- Elegant woodcreeper, Xiphorhynchus elegans (Pelzeln, 1868)
- Cocoa woodcreeper, Xiphorhynchus susurrans (Jardine, 1847)
- Buff-throated woodcreeper, Xiphorhynchus guttatus (Lichtenstein, MHC, 1820)
- Black-striped woodcreeper, Xiphorhynchus lachrymosus (Lawrence, 1862)
- Spotted woodcreeper, Xiphorhynchus erythropygius (Sclater, PL, 1860)
- Olive-backed woodcreeper, Xiphorhynchus triangularis (Lafresnaye, 1842)
- Straight-billed woodcreeper, Dendroplex picus (Gmelin, JF, 1788)
- Zimmer's woodcreeper, Dendroplex kienerii (des Murs, 1856)
- Red-billed scythebill, Campylorhamphus trochilirostris (Lichtenstein, MHC, 1820)
- Curve-billed scythebill, Campylorhamphus procurvoides (Lafresnaye, 1850)
- Brown-billed scythebill, Campylorhamphus pusillus (Sclater, PL, 1860)
- Greater scythebill, Drymotoxeres pucheranii (Lafresnaye, 1849)
- Streak-headed woodcreeper, Lepidocolaptes souleyetii (Lafresnaye, 1849)
- Montane woodcreeper, Lepidocolaptes lacrymiger (Lafresnaye, 1849)
- Duida woodcreeper, Lepidocolaptes duidae Zimmer, JT, 1934 (U)
- Slender-billed xenops, Xenops tenuirostris Pelzeln, 1859
- Northern plain-xenops, Xenops mexicanus Sclater, PL, 1857
- Amazonian plain-xenops, Xenops genibarbis Illiger, 1811
- Streaked xenops, Xenops rutilans Temminck, 1821
- Point-tailed palmcreeper, Berlepschia rikeri (Ridgway, 1887)
- Rufous-tailed xenops, Microxenops milleri Chapman, 1914
- Pacific tuftedcheek, Pseudocolaptes johnsoni Lönnberg & Rendahl, 1922
- Streaked tuftedcheek, Pseudocolaptes boissonneautii (Lafresnaye, 1840)
- Rusty-winged barbtail, Premnornis guttuliger (Sclater, PL, 1864)
- Pale-legged hornero, Furnarius leucopus Swainson, 1838
- Pale-billed hornero, Furnarius torridus Sclater, PL & Salvin, 1866
- Lesser hornero, Furnarius minor Pelzeln, 1858
- Sharp-tailed streamcreeper, Lochmias nematura (Lichtenstein, MHC, 1823)
- Chestnut-winged cinclodes, Cinclodes albidiventris Sclater, PL, 1860
- Stout-billed cinclodes, Cinclodes excelsior Sclater, PL, 1860
- Dusky-cheeked foliage-gleaner, Anabazenops dorsalis (Sclater, PL & Salvin, 1880)
- Slaty-winged foliage-gleaner, Neophilydor fuscipenne Salvin, 1866
- Rufous-rumped foliage-gleaner, Philydor erythrocercum (Pelzeln, 1859)
- Cinnamon-rumped foliage-gleaner, Philydor pyrrhodes (Cabanis, 1849)
- Montane foliage-gleaner, Anabacerthia striaticollis Lafresnaye, 1841
- Scaly-throated foliage-gleaner, Anabacerthia variegaticeps (Sclater, PL, 1857)
- Rufous-tailed foliage-gleaner, Anabacerthia ruficaudata (d'Orbigny & Lafresnaye, 1838)
- Lineated foliage-gleaner, Syndactyla subalaris (Sclater, PL, 1859)
- Chestnut-winged hookbill, Ancistrops strigilatus (Spix, 1825)
- Buff-fronted foliage-gleaner, Dendroma rufa (Vieillot, 1818)
- Chestnut-winged foliage-gleaner, Dendroma erythroptera (Sclater, PL, 1856)
- Ruddy foliage-gleaner, Clibanornis rubiginosus (Sclater, PL, 1857)
- Santa Marta foliage-gleaner, Clibanornis rufipectus (Bangs, 1898) (E)
- Uniform treehunter, Thripadectes ignobilis (Sclater, PL & Salvin, 1879)
- Flammulated treehunter, Thripadectes flammulatus (Eyton, 1849)
- Striped treehunter, Thripadectes holostictus (Sclater, PL & Salvin, 1876)
- Streak-capped treehunter, Thripadectes virgaticeps Lawrence, 1874
- Black-billed treehunter, Thripadectes melanorhynchus (Tschudi, 1844)
- Chestnut-crowned foliage-gleaner, Automolus rufipileatus (Pelzeln, 1859)
- Brown-rumped foliage-gleaner, Automolus melanopezus (Sclater, PL, 1858)
- Buff-throated foliage-gleaner, Automolus ochrolaemus (Tschudi, 1844)
- Striped woodhaunter, Automolus subulatus (Spix, 1824)
- Olive-backed foliage-gleaner, Automolus infuscatus (Sclater, PL, 1856)
- Spotted barbtail, Premnoplex brunnescens (Sclater, PL, 1856)
- Fulvous-dotted treerunner, Margarornis stellatus Sclater, PL & Salvin, 1873
- Pearled treerunner, Margarornis squamiger (d'Orbigny & Lafresnaye, 1838)
- Andean tit-spinetail, Leptasthenura andicola Sclater, PL, 1870
- Rufous-fronted thornbird, Phacellodomus rufifrons (Wied-Neuwied, M, 1821)
- White-browed spinetail, Hellmayrea gularis (Lafresnaye, 1843)
- Many-striped canastero, Asthenes flammulata (Jardine, 1850)
- Streak-backed canastero, Asthenes wyatti (Sclater, PL & Salvin, 1871)
- Perija thistletail, Asthenes perijana (Phelps, WH Jr, 1977)
- White-chinned thistletail, Asthenes fuliginosa (Lafresnaye, 1843)
- Orange-fronted plushcrown, Metopothrix aurantiaca Sclater, PL & Salvin, 1866
- Double-banded graytail, Xenerpestes minlosi Berlepsch, 1886
- Spectacled prickletail, Siptornis striaticollis (Lafresnaye, 1843)
- Orinoco softtail, Thripophaga cherriei Berlepsch & Hartert, EJO, 1902
- Rusty-backed spinetail, Cranioleuca vulpina (Pelzeln, 1856)
- Parker's spinetail, Cranioleuca vulpecula Sclater, PL & Salvin, 1866
- Crested spinetail, Cranioleuca subcristata (Sclater, PL, 1874)
- Red-faced spinetail, Cranioleuca erythrops (Sclater, PL, 1860)
- Streak-capped spinetail, Cranioleuca hellmayri (Bangs, 1907)
- Ash-browed spinetail, Cranioleuca curtata (Sclater, PL, 1870)
- Speckled spinetail, Cranioleuca gutturata
- Yellow-chinned spinetail, Certhiaxis cinnamomeus (Gmelin, JF, 1788)
- Red-and-white spinetail, Certhiaxis mustelinus (Sclater, PL, 1874)
- White-bellied spinetail, Mazaria propinqua (Pelzeln, 1859)
- Plain-crowned spinetail, Synallaxis gujanensis (Gmelin, JF, 1789)
- Slaty spinetail, Synallaxis brachyura Lafresnaye, 1843
- Silvery-throated spinetail, Synallaxis subpudica Sclater, PL, 1874 (E)
- Dusky spinetail, Synallaxis moesta Sclater, PL, 1856
- Dark-breasted spinetail, Synallaxis albigularis Sclater, PL, 1858
- Rio Orinoco spinetail, Synallaxis beverlyae Hilty & Ascanio, 2009 (U)
- Pale-breasted spinetail, Synallaxis albescens Temminck, 1823
- Azara's spinetail, Synallaxis azarae d'Orbigny, 1835
- White-whiskered spinetail, Synallaxis candei d'Orbigny & Lafresnaye, 1838
- Rusty-headed spinetail, Synallaxis fuscorufa Sclater, PL, 1882 (E)
- Rufous spinetail, Synallaxis unirufa Lafresnaye, 1843
- Stripe-breasted spinetail, Synallaxis cinnamomea Lafresnaye, 1843
- Ruddy spinetail, Synallaxis rutilans Temminck, 1823
- Chestnut-throated spinetail, Synallaxis cherriei Gyldenstolpe, 1930

== Manakins ==
Order: Passeriformes Family: Pipridae

The manakins are a family of subtropical and tropical mainland Central and South America, and Trinidad and Tobago. They are compact forest birds, the males typically being brightly colored, although the females of most species are duller and usually green-plumaged. Manakins feed on small fruits, berries and insects. Twenty-three species have been recorded in Colombia.

- Dwarf tyrant-manakin, Tyranneutes stolzmanni (Hellmayr, 1906)
- Saffron-crested tyrant-manakin, Neopelma chrysocephalum (Pelzeln, 1868)
- Yellow-headed manakin, Chloropipo flavicapilla (Sclater, PL, 1852)
- Lance-tailed manakin, Chiroxiphia lanceolata (Wagler, 1830)
- Blue-backed manakin, Chiroxiphia pareola (Linnaeus, 1766)
- Golden-winged manakin, Masius chrysopterus (Lafresnaye, 1843)
- White-ruffed manakin, Corapipo altera Hellmayr, 1906
- White-bibbed manakin, Corapipo leucorrhoa (Sclater, PL, 1863)
- Black manakin, Xenopipo atronitens Cabanis, 1847
- Green manakin, Cryptopipo holochlora (Sclater, PL, 1888)
- Velvety manakin, Lepidothrix velutina (Berlepsch, 1883)
- Blue-capped manakin, Lepidothrix coronata (Spix, 1825)
- Blue-rumped manakin, Lepidothrix isidorei (Sclater, PL, 1852)
- Orange-crowned manakin, Heterocercus aurantiivertex Sclater, PL & Salvin, 1880 (U)
- Yellow-crowned manakin, Heterocercus flavivertex Pelzeln, 1868
- White-bearded manakin, Manacus manacus (Linnaeus, 1766)
- Wire-tailed manakin, Pipra filicauda Spix, 1825
- Club-winged manakin, Machaeropterus deliciosus (Sclater, PL, 1860)
- Striolated manakin, Machaeropterus striolatus (Bonaparte, 1838)
- Fiery-capped manakin, Machaeropterus pyrocephalus (Sclater, PL, 1852)
- White-crowned manakin, Pseudopipra pipra (Linnaeus, 1758)
- Red-capped manakin, Ceratopipra mentalis (Sclater, PL, 1857)
- Golden-headed manakin, Ceratopipra erythrocephala (Linnaeus, 1758)

== Cotingas ==
Order: Passeriformes Family: Cotingidae

The cotingas are birds of forests or forest edges in tropical South America. Comparatively little is known about this diverse group, although all have broad bills with hooked tips, rounded wings, and strong legs. The males of many of the species are brightly colored or decorated with plumes or wattles. Thirty-four species have been recorded in Colombia.

- Green-and-black fruiteater, Pipreola riefferii (Boissonneau, 1840)
- Barred fruiteater, Pipreola arcuata (Lafresnaye, 1843)
- Golden-breasted fruiteater, Pipreola aureopectus (Lafresnaye, 1843)
- Orange-breasted fruiteater, Pipreola jucunda Sclater, PL, 1860
- Black-chested fruiteater, Pipreola lubomirskii Taczanowski, 1879
- Fiery-throated fruiteater, Pipreola chlorolepidota Swainson, 1838
- Scaled fruiteater, Ampelioides tschudii (Gray, GR, 1846)
- Chestnut-bellied cotinga, Doliornis remseni Robbins, Rosenberg, GH & Sornoza-Molina, 1994
- Red-crested cotinga, Ampelion rubrocristatus (d'Orbigny & Lafresnaye, 1837)
- Chestnut-crested cotinga, Ampelion rufaxilla (Tschudi, 1844)
- Black-necked red-cotinga, Phoenicircus nigricollis Swainson, 1832
- Guianan cock-of-the-rock, Rupicola rupicola (Linnaeus, 1766)
- Andean cock-of-the-rock, Rupicola peruvianus (Latham, 1790)
- Gray-tailed piha, Snowornis subalaris (Sclater, PL, 1861)
- Olivaceous piha, Snowornis cryptolophus (Sclater, PL & Salvin, 1877)
- Crimson fruitcrow, Haematoderus militaris (Shaw, 1792) (U)
- Purple-throated fruitcrow, Querula purpurata (Müller, PLS, 1776)
- Red-ruffed fruitcrow, Pyroderus scutatus (Shaw, 1792)
- Amazonian umbrellabird, Cephalopterus ornatus Geoffroy Saint-Hilaire, É, 1809
- Long-wattled umbrellabird, Cephalopterus penduliger Sclater, PL, 1859
- Capuchinbird, Perissocephalus tricolor (Müller, PLS, 1776)
- Blue cotinga, Cotinga nattererii (Boissonneau, 1840)
- Plum-throated cotinga, Cotinga maynana (Linnaeus, 1766)
- Purple-breasted cotinga, Cotinga cotinga (Linnaeus, 1766)
- Spangled cotinga, Cotinga cayana (Linnaeus, 1766)
- Rufous piha, Lipaugus unirufus Sclater, PL, 1860
- Screaming piha, Lipaugus vociferans (Wied-Neuwied, M, 1820)
- Chestnut-capped piha, Lipaugus weberi Cuervo, Salaman, Donegan & Ochoa, 2001 (E) CR
- Dusky piha, Lipaugus fuscocinereus (Lafresnaye, 1843)
- Bearded bellbird, Procnias averano (Hermann, 1783)
- Purple-throated cotinga, Porphyrolaema porphyrolaema (Deville & Sclater, PL, 1852)
- Black-tipped cotinga, Carpodectes hopkei Berlepsch, 1897
- Pompadour cotinga, Xipholena punicea (Pallas, 1764)
- Bare-necked fruitcrow, Gymnoderus foetidus (Linnaeus, 1758)

== Tityras ==
Order: Passeriformes Family: Tityridae

Tityridae are suboscine passerine birds found in forest and woodland in the Neotropics. The species in this family were formerly spread over the families Tyrannidae, Pipridae, and Cotingidae. They are small to medium-sized birds. They do not have the sophisticated vocal capabilities of the songbirds. Most, but not all, have plain coloring. Twenty-three species have been recorded in Colombia.

- Black-crowned tityra, Tityra inquisitor (Lichtenstein, MHC, 1823)
- Black-tailed tityra, Tityra cayana (Linnaeus, 1766)
- Masked tityra, Tityra semifasciata (Spix, 1825)
- Varzea schiffornis, Schiffornis major des Murs, 1856
- Northern schiffornis, Schiffornis veraepacis (Sclater, PL & Salvin, 1860)
- Foothill schiffornis, Schiffornis aenea Zimmer, JT, 1936
- Russet-winged schiffornis, Schiffornis stenorhyncha (Sclater, PL & Salvin, 1869)
- Brown-winged schiffornis, Schiffornis turdina (Wied-Neuwied, M, 1831)
- Speckled mourner, Laniocera rufescens (Sclater, PL, 1858)
- Cinereous mourner, Laniocera hypopyrra (Vieillot, 1817)
- White-browed purpletuft, Iodopleura isabellae Parzudaki, 1847
- Shrike-like cotinga, Laniisoma elegans (Thunberg, 1823)
- Green-backed becard, Pachyramphus viridis (Vieillot, 1816) (U)
- Barred becard, Pachyramphus versicolor (Hartlaub, 1843)
- Cinereous becard, Pachyramphus rufus (Boddaert, 1783)
- Cinnamon becard, Pachyramphus cinnamomeus Lawrence, 1861
- Chestnut-crowned becard, Pachyramphus castaneus (Jardine & Selby, 1827)
- Cryptic becard, Pachyramphus salvini Richmond, 1899
- White-winged becard, Pachyramphus polychopterus (Vieillot, 1818)
- Black-and-white becard, Pachyramphus albogriseus Sclater, PL, 1857
- Black-capped becard, Pachyramphus marginatus (Lichtenstein, MHC, 1823)
- One-colored becard, Pachyramphus homochrous Sclater, PL, 1859
- Pink-throated becard, Pachyramphus minor (Lesson, RP, 1831)

== Sharpbill ==
Order: Passeriformes Family: Oxyruncidae

The sharpbill is a small bird of dense forests in Central and South America. It feeds mostly on fruit but also eats insects.

- Sharpbill, Oxyruncus cristatus Swainson, 1821

== Royal flycatchers ==
Order: Passeriformes Family: Onychorhynchidae

In 2019 the SACC determined that these five species, which were formerly considered tyrant flycatchers, belonged in their own family.

- Tropical royal-flycatcher, Onychorhynchus coronatus (Müller, PLS, 1776)
- Ruddy-tailed flycatcher, Terenotriccus erythrurus (Cabanis, 1847)
- Tawny-breasted flycatcher, Myiobius villosus Sclater, PL, 1860
- Sulphur-rumped flycatcher, Myiobius barbatus (Gmelin, JF, 1789)
- Black-tailed flycatcher, Myiobius atricaudus Lawrence, 1863

== Tyrant flycatchers ==
Order: Passeriformes Family: Tyrannidae

Tyrant flycatchers are passerine birds which occur throughout North and South America. They superficially resemble the Old World flycatchers, but are more robust and have stronger bills. They do not have the sophisticated vocal capabilities of the songbirds. Most, but not all, have plain coloring. As the name implies, most are insectivorous. Two hundred-nine species have been recorded in Colombia.

- Wing-barred piprites, Piprites chloris (Temminck, 1822)
- Cinnamon manakin-tyrant, Neopipo cinnamomea (Lawrence, 1869)
- Cinnamon-crested spadebill, Platyrinchus saturatus Salvin & Godman, 1882
- White-throated spadebill, Platyrinchus mystaceus Vieillot, 1818
- Golden-crowned spadebill, Platyrinchus coronatus Sclater, PL, 1858
- Yellow-throated spadebill, Platyrinchus flavigularis Sclater, PL, 1862
- White-crested spadebill, Platyrinchus platyrhynchos (Gmelin, JF, 1788)
- Bronze-olive pygmy-tyrant, Pseudotriccus pelzelni Taczanowski & Berlepsch, 1885
- Rufous-headed pygmy-tyrant, Pseudotriccus ruficeps (Lafresnaye, 1843)
- Ringed antpipit, Corythopis torquatus Tschudi, 1844
- Antioquia bristle-tyrant, Pogonotriccus lanyoni (Graves, GR, 1988) (E)
- Marble-faced bristle-tyrant, Pogonotriccus ophthalmicus Taczanowski, 1874
- Variegated bristle-tyrant, Pogonotriccus poecilotis (Sclater, PL, 1862)
- Spectacled bristle-tyrant, Pogonotriccus orbitalis (Cabanis, 1873)
- Ecuadorian tyrannulet, Phylloscartes gualaquizae (Sclater, PL, 1887)
- Rufous-browed tyrannulet, Phylloscartes superciliaris (Sclater, PL & Salvin, 1868)
- Streak-necked flycatcher, Mionectes striaticollis (d'Orbigny & Lafresnaye, 1837)
- Olive-striped flycatcher, Mionectes olivaceus Lawrence, 1868
- Ochre-bellied flycatcher, Mionectes oleagineus (Lichtenstein, MHC, 1823)
- Sepia-capped flycatcher, Leptopogon amaurocephalus Cabanis, 1846
- Slaty-capped flycatcher, Leptopogon superciliaris Tschudi, 1844
- Rufous-breasted flycatcher, Leptopogon rufipectus (Lafresnaye, 1846)
- Brownish twistwing, Cnipodectes subbrunneus (Sclater, PL, 1860)
- Olivaceous flatbill, Rhynchocyclus olivaceus (Temminck, 1820)
- Eye-ringed flatbill, Rhynchocyclus brevirostris (Cabanis, 1847)
- Pacific flatbill, Rhynchocyclus pacificus (Chapman, 1914)
- Fulvous-breasted flatbill, Rhynchocyclus fulvipectus (Sclater, PL, 1860)
- Yellow-winged flatbill, Tolmomyias flavotectus (Hartert, EJO, 1902)
- Orange-eyed flatbill, Tolmomyias traylori Schulenberg & Parker, TA, 1997
- Yellow-margined flatbill, Tolmomyias assimilis (Pelzeln, 1868)
- Gray-crowned flatbill, Tolmomyias poliocephalus (Taczanowski, 1884)
- Yellow-breasted flatbill, Tolmomyias flaviventris (Wied-Neuwied, M, 1831)
- Olive-faced flatbill, Tolmomyias viridiceps (Sclater, PL & Salvin, 1873)
- Yellow-olive flatbill, Tolmomyias sulphurescens (Spix, 1825)
- Black-capped pygmy-tyrant, Myiornis atricapillus (Lawrence, 1875)
- Short-tailed pygmy-tyrant, Myiornis ecaudatus (d'Orbigny & Lafresnaye, 1837)
- Northern bentbill, Oncostoma cinereigulare (Sclater, PL, 1857)
- Southern bentbill, Oncostoma olivaceum (Lawrence, 1862)
- Scale-crested pygmy-tyrant, Lophotriccus pileatus (Tschudi, 1844)
- Double-banded pygmy-tyrant, Lophotriccus vitiosus (Bangs & Penard, TE, 1921)
- Helmeted pygmy-tyrant, Lophotriccus galeatus (Boddaert, 1783)
- Pale-eyed pygmy-tyrant, Atalotriccus pilaris (Cabanis, 1847)
- White-eyed tody-tyrant, Hemitriccus zosterops (Pelzeln, 1868)
- Johannes's tody-tyrant, Hemitriccus iohannis (Snethlage, E, 1907)
- Stripe-necked tody-tyrant, Hemitriccus striaticollis (Lafresnaye, 1853)
- Pearly-vented tody-tyrant, Hemitriccus margaritaceiventer (d'Orbigny & Lafresnaye, 1837)
- Black-throated tody-tyrant, Hemitriccus granadensis (Hartlaub, 1843)
- Buff-throated tody-tyrant, Hemitriccus rufigularis (Cabanis, 1873)
- Rufous-crowned tody-flycatcher, Poecilotriccus ruficeps (Kaup, 1852)
- Black-and-white tody-flycatcher, Poecilotriccus capitalis (Sclater, PL, 1857)
- Rusty-fronted tody-flycatcher, Poecilotriccus latirostris (Pelzeln, 1868)
- Slate-headed tody-flycatcher, Poecilotriccus sylvia (Desmarest, 1806)
- Golden-winged tody-flycatcher, Poecilotriccus calopterus (Sclater, PL, 1857)
- Spotted tody-flycatcher, Todirostrum maculatum (Desmarest, 1806)
- Common tody-flycatcher, Todirostrum cinereum (Linnaeus, 1766)
- Black-headed tody-flycatcher, Todirostrum nigriceps Sclater, PL, 1855
- Painted tody-flycatcher, Todirostrum pictum (Salvin, 1897) (U)
- Yellow-browed tody-flycatcher, Todirostrum chrysocrotaphum Strickland, 1850
- Ornate flycatcher, Myiotriccus ornatus (Lafresnaye, 1853)
- Handsome flycatcher, Nephelomyias pulcher (Sclater, PL, 1861)
- Cliff flycatcher, Hirundinea ferruginea (Gmelin, JF, 1788)
- Cinnamon flycatcher, Pyrrhomyias cinnamomeus (d'Orbigny & Lafresnaye, 1837)
- Mistletoe tyrannulet, Zimmerius vilissimus (Sclater, PL & Salvin, 1859)
- Spectacled tyrannulet, Zimmerius improbus (Sclater, PL & Salvin, 1871)
- Choco tyrannulet, Zimmerius albigularis (Chapman, 1924)
- Slender-footed tyrannulet, Zimmerius gracilipes (Sclater, PL & Salvin, 1868)
- Golden-faced tyrannulet, Zimmerius chrysops (Sclater, PL, 1859)
- Lesser wagtail-tyrant, Stigmatura napensis Chapman, 1926
- Slender-billed tyrannulet, Inezia tenuirostris (Cory, 1913)
- Amazonian tyrannulet, Inezia subflava (Sclater, PL & Salvin, 1873)
- Pale-tipped tyrannulet, Inezia caudata (Salvin, 1897)
- Fulvous-crowned scrub-tyrant, Euscarthmus meloryphus Wied-Neuwied, M, 1831
- Fulvous-faced scrub-tyrant, Euscarthmus fulviceps (Sclater, PL, 1871) (U)
- Yellow-bellied elaenia, Elaenia flavogaster (Thunberg, 1822)
- Caribbean elaenia, Elaenia martinica (Linnaeus, 1766)
- Large elaenia, Elaenia spectabilis Pelzeln, 1868
- White-crested elaenia, Elaenia albiceps (d'Orbigny & Lafresnaye, 1837)
- Small-billed elaenia, Elaenia parvirostris Pelzeln, 1868
- Slaty elaenia, Elaenia strepera Cabanis, 1883
- Mottle-backed elaenia, Elaenia gigas Sclater, PL, 1871
- Brownish elaenia, Elaenia pelzelni Berlepsch, 1907 (U)
- Plain-crested elaenia, Elaenia cristata Pelzeln, 1868
- Lesser elaenia, Elaenia chiriquensis Lawrence, 1865
- Coopmans's elaenia, Elaenia brachyptera Berlepsch, 1907
- Rufous-crowned elaenia, Elaenia ruficeps Pelzeln, 1868
- Mountain elaenia, Elaenia frantzii Lawrence, 1865
- Sierran elaenia, Elaenia pallatangae Sclater, PL, 1862
- Yellow-crowned tyrannulet, Tyrannulus elatus (Latham, 1790)
- Forest elaenia, Myiopagis gaimardii (d'Orbigny, 1840)
- Gray elaenia, Myiopagis caniceps (Swainson, 1835)
- Foothill elaenia, Myiopagis olallai Coopmans & Krabbe, 2000
- Yellow-crowned elaenia, Myiopagis flavivertex (Sclater, PL, 1887)
- Greenish elaenia, Myiopagis viridicata (Vieillot, 1817)
- Yellow tyrannulet, Capsiempis flaveola (Lichtenstein, MHC, 1823)
- White-tailed tyrannulet, Mecocerculus poecilocercus (Sclater, PL & Salvin, 1873)
- White-banded tyrannulet, Mecocerculus stictopterus (Sclater, PL, 1859)
- White-throated tyrannulet, Mecocerculus leucophrys (d'Orbigny & Lafresnaye, 1837)
- Sulphur-bellied tyrannulet, Mecocerculus minor (Taczanowski, 1879)
- Sooty-headed tyrannulet, Phyllomyias griseiceps (Sclater, PL & Salvin, 1871)
- Plumbeous-crowned tyrannulet, Phyllomyias plumbeiceps (Lawrence, 1869)
- White-fronted tyrannulet, Acrochordopus zeledoni (Lawrence, 1869)
- Ashy-headed tyrannulet, Tyranniscus cinereiceps (Sclater, PL, 1860)
- Black-capped tyrannulet, Tyranniscus nigrocapillus (Lafresnaye, 1845)
- Tawny-rumped tyrannulet, Tyranniscus uropygialis (Lawrence, 1869)
- Venezuelan beardless-tyrannulet, Camptostoma pusillum (E) (Cabanis & Heine, 1860)
- Cauca beardless-tyrannulet, Camptostoma caucae Chapman, 1914
- Brown-capped tyrannulet, Ornithion brunneicapillus (Lawrence, 1862)
- White-lored tyrannulet, Ornithion inerme Hartlaub, 1853
- Mouse-colored tyrannulet, Nesotriccus murinus (Spix, 1825) (see note) (Note: The SACC has split Nesotriccus maranonicus from Nesotriccus murinus (Proposal 956) but has not assigned English names, so the proposal has not been implemented and the counts do not reflect the change.)
- Tufted tit-tyrant, Anairetes parulus (Kittlitz, 1830)
- Bearded tachuri, Polystictus pectoralis (Vieillot, 1817)
- Subtropical doradito, Pseudocolopteryx acutipennis (Sclater, PL & Salvin, 1873)
- Torrent tyrannulet, Serpophaga cinerea (Tschudi, 1844)
- River tyrannulet, Serpophaga hypoleuca Sclater, PL & Salvin, 1866
- Agile tit-tyrant, Uromyias agilis (Sclater, PL, 1856)
- Short-tailed field tyrant, Muscigralla brevicauda d'Orbigny & Lafresnaye, 1837 (V)
- Cinnamon attila, Attila cinnamomeus (Gmelin, JF, 1789)
- Ochraceous attila, Attila torridus Sclater, PL, 1860
- Citron-bellied attila, Attila citriniventris Sclater, PL, 1859
- Dull-capped attila, Attila bolivianus Lafresnaye, 1848
- Bright-rumped attila, Attila spadiceus (Gmelin, JF, 1789)
- Piratic flycatcher, Legatus leucophaius (Vieillot, 1818)
- Large-headed flatbill, Ramphotrigon megacephalum (Swainson, 1835)
- Rufous-tailed flatbill, Ramphotrigon ruficauda (Spix, 1825)
- Dusky-tailed flatbill, Ramphotrigon fuscicauda Chapman, 1925
- Great kiskadee, Pitangus sulphuratus (Linnaeus, 1766)
- Lesser kiskadee, Philohydor lictor (Lichtenstein, MHC, 1823)
- Cattle tyrant, Machetornis rixosa (Vieillot, 1819)
- Sulphury flycatcher, Tyrannopsis sulphurea (Spix, 1825)
- Boat-billed flycatcher, Megarynchus pitangua (Linnaeus, 1766)
- Golden-bellied flycatcher, Myiodynastes hemichrysus (Cabanis, 1861)
- Sulphur-bellied flycatcher, Myiodynastes luteiventris Sclater, PL, 1859
- Streaked flycatcher, Myiodynastes maculatus (Müller, PLS, 1776)
- Rusty-margined flycatcher, Myiozetetes cayanensis (Linnaeus, 1766)
- Social flycatcher, Myiozetetes similis (Spix, 1825)
- Gray-capped flycatcher, Myiozetetes granadensis Lawrence, 1862
- Dusky-chested flycatcher, Myiozetetes luteiventris (Sclater, PL, 1858)
- White-ringed flycatcher, Conopias albovittatus (Lawrence, 1862)
- Yellow-throated flycatcher, Conopias parvus (Pelzeln, 1868)
- Lemon-browed flycatcher, Conopias cinchoneti (Tschudi, 1844)
- White-bearded flycatcher, Phelpsia inornata (Lawrence, 1869)
- Variegated flycatcher, Empidonomus varius (Vieillot, 1818)
- Crowned slaty flycatcher, Empidonomus aurantioatrocristatus
- Snowy-throated kingbird, Tyrannus niveigularis Sclater, PL, 1860
- White-throated kingbird, Tyrannus albogularis Burmeister, 1856 (U)
- Tropical kingbird, Tyrannus melancholicus Vieillot, 1819
- Scissor-tailed flycatcher, Tyrannus forficatus (Gmelin, JF, 1789) (V)
- Couch's kingbird, Tyrannus couchii Baird, SF, 1858 (SA)
- Fork-tailed flycatcher, Tyrannus savana Daudin, 1802
- Eastern kingbird, Tyrannus tyrannus (Linnaeus, 1758)
- Gray kingbird, Tyrannus dominicensis (Gmelin, JF, 1788)
- Rufous mourner, Rhytipterna holerythra (Sclater, PL & Salvin, 1860)
- Grayish mourner, Rhytipterna simplex (Lichtenstein, MHC, 1823)
- Pale-bellied mourner, Rhytipterna immunda (Sclater, PL & Salvin, 1873)
- Choco sirystes, Sirystes albogriseus (Lawrence, 1863)
- White-rumped sirystes, Sirystes albocinereus Sclater, PL & Salvin, 1880
- Dusky-capped flycatcher, Myiarchus tuberculifer (d'Orbigny & Lafresnaye, 1837)
- Swainson's flycatcher, Myiarchus swainsoni Cabanis & Heine, 1860
- Venezuelan flycatcher, Myiarchus venezuelensis Lawrence, 1865
- Panama flycatcher, Myiarchus panamensis Lawrence, 1860
- Short-crested flycatcher, Myiarchus ferox (Gmelin, JF, 1789)
- Apical flycatcher, Myiarchus apicalis Sclater, PL & Salvin, 1881 (E)
- Pale-edged flycatcher, Myiarchus cephalotes Taczanowski, 1880
- Great crested flycatcher, Myiarchus crinitus (Linnaeus, 1758)
- Brown-crested flycatcher, Myiarchus tyrannulus (Müller, PLS, 1776)
- Long-tailed tyrant, Colonia colonus (Vieillot, 1818)
- Flavescent flycatcher, Myiophobus flavicans (Sclater, PL, 1861)
- Orange-crested flycatcher, Myiophobus phoenicomitra (Taczanowski & Berlepsch, 1885)
- Bran-colored flycatcher, Myiophobus fasciatus (Müller, PLS, 1776)
- Mouse-gray flycatcher, Myiophobus crypterythrus (Sclater, PL, 1861)
- Crowned chat-tyrant, Silvicultrix frontalis (Lafresnaye, 1847)
- Yellow-bellied chat-tyrant, Silvicultrix diadema (Hartlaub, 1843)
- Slaty-backed chat-tyrant, Ochthoeca cinnamomeiventris (Lafresnaye, 1843)
- Rufous-breasted chat-tyrant, Ochthoeca rufipectoralis (d'Orbigny & Lafresnaye, 1837)
- Brown-backed chat-tyrant, Ochthoeca fumicolor Sclater, PL, 1856
- Northern scrub-flycatcher, Sublegatus arenarum (Salvin, 1863)
- Amazonian scrub-flycatcher, Sublegatus obscurior Todd, 1920
- Southern scrub-flycatcher, Sublegatus modestus (Wied-Neuwied, M, 1831)
- Vermilion flycatcher, Pyrocephalus rubinus (Boddaert, 1783)
- Pied water-tyrant, Fluvicola pica (Boddaert, 1783)
- Masked water-tyrant, Fluvicola nengeta (Linnaeus, 1766)
- White-headed marsh tyrant, Arundinicola leucocephala (Linnaeus, 1764)
- Riverside tyrant, Knipolegus orenocensis Berlepsch, 1884
- Rufous-tailed tyrant, Knipolegus poecilurus (Sclater, PL, 1862)
- Amazonian black-tyrant, Knipolegus poecilocercus (Pelzeln, 1868)
- Yellow-browed tyrant, Satrapa icterophrys (Vieillot, 1818)
- Little ground-tyrant, Muscisaxicola fluviatilis (U)
- Spot-billed ground-tyrant, Muscisaxicola maculirostris d'Orbigny & Lafresnaye, 1837
- White-browed ground-tyrant, Muscisaxicola albilora Lafresnaye, 1855 (V)
- Plain-capped ground-tyrant, Muscisaxicola alpinus (Jardine, 1849)
- Red-rumped bush-tyrant, Cnemarchus erythropygius (Sclater, PL, 1853)
- Black-billed shrike-tyrant, Agriornis montanus (d'Orbigny & Lafresnaye, 1837)
- Streak-throated bush-tyrant, Myiotheretes striaticollis (Sclater, PL, 1853)
- Santa Marta bush-tyrant, Myiotheretes pernix (Bangs, 1899) (E)
- Smoky bush-tyrant, Myiotheretes fumigatus (Boissonneau, 1840)
- Drab water tyrant, Ochthornis littoralis (Pelzeln, 1868)
- Fuscous flycatcher, Cnemotriccus fuscatus (Wied-Neuwied, M, 1831)
- Black-billed flycatcher, Aphanotriccus audax (Nelson, 1912)
- Euler's flycatcher, Lathrotriccus euleri (Cabanis, 1868)
- Tufted flycatcher, Mitrephanes phaeocercus (Sclater, PL, 1859)
- Black phoebe, Sayornis nigricans (Swainson, 1827)
- Acadian flycatcher, Empidonax virescens (Vieillot, 1818)
- Willow flycatcher, Empidonax traillii (Audubon, 1828)
- Least flycatcher, Empidonax minimus (Baird, WM & Baird, SF, 1843) (SA)
- Alder flycatcher, Empidonax alnorum Brewster, 1895
- Olive-sided flycatcher, Contopus cooperi (Nuttall, 1831)
- Smoke-colored pewee, Contopus fumigatus (d'Orbigny & Lafresnaye, 1837)
- Western wood-pewee, Contopus sordidulus Sclater, PL, 1859
- Eastern wood-pewee, Contopus virens (Linnaeus, 1766)
- Tropical pewee, Contopus cinereus (Spix, 1825)
- Blackish pewee, Contopus nigrescens Sclater, PL & Salvin, 1880 (U)

== Vireos ==
Order: Passeriformes Family: Vireonidae

The vireos are a group of small to medium-sized passerine birds. They are typically greenish in color and resemble wood warblers apart from their heavier bills. Twenty-two species have been recorded in Colombia.

- Rufous-browed peppershrike, Cyclarhis gujanensis (Gmelin, JF, 1789)
- Black-billed peppershrike, Cyclarhis nigrirostris Lafresnaye, 1842
- Scrub greenlet, Hylophilus flavipes Lafresnaye, 1845
- Gray-chested greenlet, Hylophilus semicinereus Sclater, PL & Salvin, 1867 (U)
- Brown-headed greenlet, Hylophilus brunneiceps Sclater, PL, 1866
- Lemon-chested greenlet, Hylophilus thoracicus Temminck, 1822
- Yellow-browed shrike-vireo, Vireolanius eximius Baird, SF, 1866
- Slaty-capped shrike-vireo, Vireolanius leucotis (Swainson, 1838)
- Ochre-crowned brownlet, Tunchiornis ochraceiceps (Sclater, PL, 1860)
- Rufous-fronted brownlet, Tunchiornis ferrugineifrons (Sclater, PL, 1862)
- Lesser greenlet, Pachysylvia decurtata (Bonaparte, 1838)
- Dusky-capped greenlet, Pachysylvia hypoxantha (Pelzeln, 1868)
- Golden-fronted greenlet, Pachysylvia aurantiifrons (Lawrence, 1861)
- Rufous-naped greenlet, Pachysylvia semibrunnea (Lafresnaye, 1845)
- White-eyed vireo, Vireo griseus (Boddaert, 1783) (V)
- San Andres vireo, Vireo caribaeus Bond, J & Meyer de Schauensee, 1942 (SA)
- Yellow-throated vireo, Vireo flavifrons Vieillot, 1808
- Choco vireo, Vireo masteri Salaman & Stiles, 1996
- Philadelphia vireo, Vireo philadelphicus (Cassin, 1851)
- Brown-capped vireo, Vireo leucophrys (Lafresnaye, 1844)
- Red-eyed vireo, Vireo olivaceus (Linnaeus, 1766)
- Chivi vireo, Vireo chivi (Vieillot, 1817)
- Yellow-green vireo, Vireo flavoviridis (Cassin, 1851)
- Black-whiskered vireo, Vireo altiloquus (Vieillot, 1808)

== Jays ==
Order: Passeriformes Family: Corvidae

The family Corvidae includes crows, ravens, jays, choughs, magpies, treepies, nutcrackers, and ground jays. Corvids are above average in size among the Passeriformes, and some of the larger species show high levels of intelligence. Nine species have been recorded in Colombia.

- Black-collared jay, Cyanolyca armillata (Gray, GR, 1845)
- Turquoise jay, Cyanolyca turcosa (Bonaparte, 1853)
- Beautiful jay, Cyanolyca pulchra (Lawrence, 1876)
- Violaceous jay, Cyanocorax violaceus Du Bus de Gisignies, 1847
- Black-chested jay, Cyanocorax affinis Pelzeln, 1856
- Azure-naped jay, Cyanocorax heilprini Gentry, 1885
- Green jay, Cyanocorax yncas (Boddaert, 1783)
- Rook, Corvus frugilegus Linnaeus, 1758 (UN)(V)
- Hooded crow, Corvus cornix Linnaeus, 1758 (UN)(V)

== Larks ==
Order: Passeriformes Family: Alaudidae

Larks are small terrestrial birds with often extravagant songs and display flights. Most larks are fairly dull in appearance. Their food is insects and seeds. Two species have been recorded in Colombia.

- Eurasian skylark, Alauda arvensis Linnaeus, 1758 (UN)(I)
- Horned lark, Eremophila alpestris (Linnaeus, 1758)

== Grassbirds and allies ==
Order: Passeriformes Family: Locustellidae

Locustellidae are a family of small insectivorous songbirds found mainly in Eurasia, Africa, and the Australian region. They are smallish birds with tails that are usually long and pointed, and tend to be drab brownish or buffy all over. One species has been recorded in Colombia.

- Middendorff's grasshopper warbler, Helopsaltes ochotensis (Middendorff, 1853) (UN)(V)

== Swallows ==
Order: Passeriformes Family: Hirundinidae

The family Hirundinidae is adapted to aerial feeding. They have a slender streamlined body, long pointed wings, and a short bill with a wide gape. The feet are adapted to perching rather than walking, and the front toes are partially joined at the base. Nineteen species have been recorded in Colombia.

- Blue-and-white swallow, Pygochelidon cyanoleuca (Vieillot, 1817)
- Black-collared swallow, Pygochelidon melanoleuca (Wied-Neuwied, M, 1820)
- Tawny-headed swallow, Alopochelidon fucata (Temminck, 1822)
- Brown-bellied swallow, Orochelidon murina (Cassin, 1853)
- Pale-footed swallow, Orochelidon flavipes (Chapman, 1922)
- White-banded swallow, Atticora fasciata (Gmelin, JF, 1789)
- White-thighed swallow, Atticora tibialis (Cassin, 1853)
- Southern rough-winged swallow, Stelgidopteryx ruficollis (Vieillot, 1817)
- Brown-chested martin, Progne tapera (Linnaeus, 1766)
- Purple martin, Progne subis (Linnaeus, 1758)
- Gray-breasted martin, Progne chalybea (Gmelin, JF, 1789)
- Southern martin, Progne elegans Baird, SF, 1865 (U)
- Peruvian martin, Progne murphyi Chapman, 1925
- Tree swallow, Tachycineta bicolor (Vieillot, 1808)
- White-winged swallow, Tachycineta albiventer (Boddaert, 1783)
- Bank swallow, Riparia riparia (Linnaeus, 1758)
- Barn swallow, Hirundo rustica Linnaeus, 1758
- Common house-martin, Delichon urbica (Linnaeus, 1758) (UN)(V)
- Cliff swallow, Petrochelidon pyrrhonota (Vieillot, 1817)
- Cave swallow, Petrochelidon fulva (Vieillot, 1808) (V)

== Leaf warblers ==
Order: Passeriformes Family: Phylloscopidae

Leaf warblers are a family of small insectivorous birds found mostly in Eurasia and ranging into Wallacea and Africa. The Arctic warbler breeds east into Alaska. The species are of various sizes, often green-plumaged above and yellow below, or more subdued with grayish-green to grayish-brown colors. One species has been recorded in Colombia.

- Willow warbler, Phylloscopus trochilus (Linnaeus, 1758) (UN)(V)

== Wrens ==
Order: Passeriformes Family: Troglodytidae

The wrens are mainly small and inconspicuous except for their loud songs. These birds have short wings and thin down-turned bills. Several species often hold their tails upright. All are insectivorous. Colombia has the greatest diversity of wrens on earth; thirty-six species have been recorded in the country.

- Scaly-breasted wren, Microcerculus marginatus (Sclater, PL, 1855)
- Wing-banded wren, Microcerculus bambla (Boddaert, 1783)
- Gray-mantled wren, Odontorchilus branickii (Taczanowski & Berlepsch, 1885)
- Southern house-wren, Troglodytes musculus Naumnn, 1823
- Ochraceous wren, Troglodytes ochraceus Ridgway, 1882
- Mountain wren, Troglodytes solstitialis Sclater, PL, 1859
- Santa Marta wren, Troglodytes monticola Bangs, 1899 (E) CR
- Grass wren, Cistothorus platensis (Latham, 1790)
- Apolinar's wren, Cistothorus apolinari Chapman, 1914 (E)
- White-headed wren, Campylorhynchus albobrunneus (Lawrence, 1862)
- Band-backed wren, Campylorhynchus zonatus (Lesson, RP, 1832)
- Stripe-backed wren, Campylorhynchus nuchalis Cabanis, 1847
- Bicolored wren, Campylorhynchus griseus (Swainson, 1838)
- Thrush-like wren, Campylorhynchus turdinus (Wied-Neuwied, M, 1821)
- Sooty-headed wren, Pheugopedius spadix Bangs, 1910
- Black-bellied wren, Pheugopedius fasciatoventris (Lafresnaye, 1845)
- Plain-tailed wren, Pheugopedius euophrys (Sclater, PL, 1860)
- Whiskered wren, Pheugopedius mystacalis (Sclater, PL, 1860)
- Coraya wren, Pheugopedius coraya (Gmelin, JF, 1789)
- Rufous-breasted wren, Pheugopedius rutilus (Vieillot, 1819)
- Speckle-breasted wren, Pheugopedius sclateri (Taczanowski, 1879)
- Rufous-and-white wren, Thryophilus rufalbus (Lafresnaye, 1845)
- Antioquia wren, Thryophilus sernai Lara, Cuervo, Valderrama, Calderón-Franco & Cadena, 2012 (E)
- Niceforo's wren, Thryophilus nicefori (Meyer de Schauensee, 1946) (E) CR
- Stripe-throated wren, Cantorchilus leucopogon (Salvadori & Festa, 1899)
- Bay wren, Cantorchilus nigricapillus (Sclater, PL, 1860)
- Buff-breasted wren, Cantorchilus leucotis (Lafresnaye, 1845)
- Rufous wren, Cinnycerthia unirufa (Lafresnaye, 1840)
- Sharpe's wren, Cinnycerthia olivascens Sharpe, 1882
- White-breasted wood-wren, Henicorhina leucosticta (Cabanis, 1847)
- Gray-breasted wood-wren, Henicorhina leucophrys (Tschudi, 1844)
- Hermit wood-wren, Henicorhina anachoreta Bangs, 1899 (E)
- Munchique wood-wren, Henicorhina negreti Salaman, Coopmans, Donegan, Mulligan, Cortés-Diago, Hilty & Ortega, 2003 (E)
- Chestnut-breasted wren, Cyphorhinus thoracicus Tschudi, 1844
- Song wren, Cyphorhinus phaeocephalus Sclater, PL, 1860
- Musician wren, Cyphorhinus arada (Hermann, 1783)

== Gnatcatchers ==
Order: Passeriformes Family: Polioptilidae

These dainty birds resemble Old World warblers in their build and habits, moving restlessly through the foliage seeking insects. The gnatcatchers and gnatwrens are mainly soft bluish gray in color and have the typical insectivore's long sharp bill. They are birds of fairly open woodland or scrub, which nest in bushes or trees. Seven species have been recorded in Colombia.

- Collared gnatwren, Microbates collaris (Pelzeln, 1868)
- Half-collared gnatwren, Microbates cinereiventris (Sclater, PL, 1855)
- Trilling gnatwren, Ramphocaenus melanurus Vieillot, 1819
- Tropical gnatcatcher, Polioptila plumbea (Gmelin, JF, 1788)
- Rio Negro gnatcatcher, Polioptila facilis Zimmer, JT, 1942
- Guianan gnatcatcher, Polioptila guianensis Todd, 1920 (U)
- Slate-throated gnatcatcher, Polioptila schistaceigula Hartert, EJO, 1898

== Donacobius ==
Order: Passeriformes Family: Donacobiidae

The black-capped donacobius is found in wet habitats from Panama across northern South America and east of the Andes to Argentina and Paraguay.

- Black-capped donacobius, Donacobius atricapilla (Linnaeus, 1766)

== Dippers ==
Order: Passeriformes Family: Cinclidae

Dippers are a group of perching birds whose habitat includes aquatic environments in the Americas, Europe, and Asia. They are named for their bobbing or dipping movements. One species has been recorded in Colombia.

- White-capped dipper, Cinclus leucocephalus Tschudi, 1844

== Waxwings ==
Order: Passeriformes Family: Bombycillidae

The waxwings are a group of birds with soft silky plumage and unique red tips to some of the wing feathers. In the Bohemian and cedar waxwings, these tips look like sealing wax and give the group its name. These are arboreal birds of northern forests. They live on insects in summer and berries in winter. One species has been recorded in Colombia.

- Cedar waxwing, Bombycilla cedrorum Vieillot, 1808 (V)

== Thrushes ==
Order: Passeriformes Family: Turdidae

The thrushes are a group of passerine birds that occur mainly in the Old World. They are plump, soft plumaged, small to medium-sized insectivores or sometimes omnivores, often feeding on the ground. Many have attractive songs. Thirty-one species have been recorded in Colombia.

- Varied solitaire, Myadestes coloratus Nelson, 1912
- Andean solitaire, Myadestes ralloides (d'Orbigny, 1840)
- Orange-billed nightingale-thrush, Catharus aurantiirostris (Hartlaub, 1850)
- Slaty-backed nightingale-thrush, Catharus fuscater (Lafresnaye, 1845)
- Speckled nightingale-thrush, Catharus maculatus (Sclater, PL, 1858)
- Veery, Catharus fuscescens (Stephens, 1817)
- Gray-cheeked thrush, Catharus minimus (Lafresnaye, 1848)
- Swainson's thrush, Catharus ustulatus (Nuttall, 1840)
- Wood thrush, Hylocichla mustelina (Gmelin, JF, 1789)
- Black solitaire, Entomodestes coracinus (Berlepsch, 1897)
- Rufous-brown solitaire, Cichlopsis leucogenys Cabanis, 1851
- Eurasian blackbird, Turdus merula Linnaeus, 1758 (UN)(V)
- Pale-eyed thrush, Turdus leucops Taczanowski, 1877
- Yellow-legged thrush, Turdus flavipes Vieillot, 1818
- Pale-breasted thrush, Turdus leucomelas Vieillot, 1818
- Cocoa thrush, Turdus fumigatus Lichtenstein, MHC, 1823
- Hauxwell's thrush, Turdus hauxwelli Lawrence, 1869
- Pale-vented thrush, Turdus obsoletus Lawrence, 1862
- Song thrush, Turdus philomelos Brehm, 1831 (UN)(V)
- Clay-colored thrush, Turdus grayi Bonaparte, 1838
- Spectacled thrush, Turdus nudigenis Lafresnaye, 1848
- Varzea thrush, Turdus sanchezorum O'Neill, Lane & Naka, 2011
- Lawrence's thrush, Turdus lawrencii Coues, 1880
- Black-billed thrush, Turdus ignobilis Sclater, PL, 1858
- Campina thrush, Turdus arthuri (Chubb, C, 1914)
- Chestnut-bellied thrush, Turdus fulviventris Sclater, PL, 1858
- Black-hooded thrush, Turdus olivater (Lafresnaye, 1848)
- Great thrush, Turdus fuscater d'Orbigny & Lafresnaye, 1837
- Glossy-black thrush, Turdus serranus Tschudi, 1844
- Dagua thrush, Turdus daguae von Berlepsch, 1897
- Gray-flanked thrush, Turdus phaeopygus Cabanis, 1849

== Old World flycatchers ==
Order: Passeriformes Family: Muscicapidae

The Old World flycatchers form a large family of small passerine birds. These are mainly small arboreal insectivores, many of which, as the name implies, take their prey on the wing. One species has been recorded in Colombia.

- Siberian rubythroat, Calliope calliope (Pallas, 1776) (UN)(V)

== Mockingbirds ==
Order: Passeriformes Family: Mimidae

The mimids are a family of passerine birds that includes thrashers, mockingbirds, tremblers, and the New World catbirds. These birds are notable for their vocalizations, especially their ability to mimic a wide variety of birds and other sounds heard outdoors. Their coloring tends towards dull-grays and browns. Two species have been recorded in Colombia.

- Gray catbird, Dumetella carolinensis (Linnaeus, 1766)
- Tropical mockingbird, Mimus gilvus (Vieillot, 1808)

== Estreldids ==
Order: Passeriformes Family: Estrildidae

The members of this family are small passerine birds native to the Old World tropics. They are gregarious and often colonial seed eaters with short thick but pointed bills. They are all similar in structure and habits, but have wide variation in plumage colors and patterns. Two species have been recorded in Colombia.

- Tricolored munia, Lonchura malacca (Linnaeus, 1766) (I)
- Java sparrow, Lonchura oryzivora (Linnaeus, 1758) (I)

== Accentors ==
Order: Passeriformes Family: Prunellidae

Accentors are small, fairly drab species superficially similar, but unrelated to, sparrows. However, accentors have thin sharp bills, reflecting their diet of insects in summer, augmented with seeds and berries in winter. One species has been recorded in Colombia.

- Siberian accentor, Prunella montanella (Pallas, 1776) (UN)(V)

== Old World sparrows ==
Order: Passeriformes Family: Passeridae

Sparrows are small passerine birds. In general, sparrows tend to be small, plump, brown or gray birds with short tails and short powerful beaks. Sparrows are seed eaters, but they also consume small insects. Two species have been recorded in Colombia.

- House sparrow, Passer domesticus (Linnaeus, 1758) (I)
- Eurasian tree sparrow, Passer montanus (Linnaeus, 1758) (UN)(uncertain origin)

== Pipits and wagtails ==
Order: Passeriformes Family: Motacillidae

Motacillidae is a family of small passerine birds with medium to long tails. They include the wagtails, longclaws, and pipits. They are slender ground-feeding insectivores of open country. Six species have been recorded in Colombia.

- American pipit, Anthus rubescens (Tunstall, 1771) (SA) (U)
- Red-throated pipit, Anthus cervinus (Pallas, 1811) (UN)(V)
- Yellowish pipit, Anthus chii Vieillot, 1818
- Paramo pipit, Anthus bogotensis Sclater, PL, 1855
- Pechora pipit, Anthus gustavi R. Swinhoe, 1863 (UN)(V)
- Meadow pipit, Anthus pratensis (Linnaeus, 1758) (UN)(V)

== Finches ==
Order: Passeriformes Family: Fringillidae

Finches are seed-eating passerine birds, that are small to moderately large and have a strong beak, usually conical and in some species very large. All have twelve tail feathers and nine primaries. These birds have a bouncing flight with alternating bouts of flapping and gliding on closed wings, and most sing well. Twenty-six species have been recorded in Colombia.

- Brambling, Fringilla montifringilla Linnaeus, 1758 (UN)(V)
- Hawfinch, Coccothraustes coccothraustes (Linnaeus, 1758) (UN)(V)
- Andean siskin, Spinus spinescens (Bonaparte, 1850)
- Yellow-faced siskin, Spinus yarrellii (Audubon, 1839) (V)
- Red siskin, Spinus cucullatus (Swainson, 1820)
- Hooded siskin, Spinus magellanicus (Vieillot, 1805)
- Yellow-bellied siskin, Spinus xanthogastrus (Du Bus de Gisignies, 1855)
- Lesser goldfinch, Spinus psaltria (Say, 1822)
- Eurasian bullfinch, Pyrrhula pyrrhula (Linnaeus, 1758) (UN)(V)
- Golden-rumped euphonia, Chlorophonia cyanocephala (Vieillot, 1819)
- Blue-naped chlorophonia, Chlorophonia cyanea (Thunberg, 1822)
- Chestnut-breasted chlorophonia, Chlorophonia pyrrhophrys (Sclater, PL, 1851)
- Yellow-collared chlorophonia, Chlorophonia flavirostris Sclater, PL, 1861
- Orange-crowned euphonia, Euphonia saturata (Cabanis, 1861)
- Plumbeous euphonia, Euphonia plumbea Du Bus de Gisignies, 1855
- Purple-throated euphonia, Euphonia chlorotica (Linnaeus, 1766)
- Velvet-fronted euphonia, Euphonia concinna Sclater, PL, 1855 (E)
- Trinidad euphonia, Euphonia trinitatis Strickland, 1851
- Golden-bellied euphonia, Euphonia chrysopasta Sclater, PL & Salvin, 1869
- White-vented euphonia, Euphonia minuta Cabanis, 1849
- Thick-billed euphonia, Euphonia laniirostris d'Orbigny & Lafresnaye, 1837
- Fulvous-vented euphonia, Euphonia fulvicrissa Sclater, PL, 1857
- Tawny-capped euphonia, Euphonia anneae Cassin, 1865
- Orange-bellied euphonia, Euphonia xanthogaster Sundevall, 1834
- Bronze-green euphonia, Euphonia mesochrysa Salvadori, 1873
- Rufous-bellied euphonia, Euphonia rufiventris (Vieillot, 1819)

== Thrush-tanager ==
Order: Passeriformes Family: Rhodinocichlidae

This species was historically placed in family Thraupidae. It was placed in its own family in 2017.

- Rosy thrush-tanager, Rhodinocichla rosea (Lesson, RP, 1832)

== Old World buntings ==
Order: Passeriformes Family: Emberizidae

Emberizidae is a family of passerine birds containing a single genus. Until 2017, the New World sparrows (Passerellidae) were also considered part of this family. One species has been recorded in Colombia.

- Rustic bunting, Emberiza rustica Pallas, 1776 (UN)(V)

== Sparrows ==
Order: Passeriformes Family: Passerellidae

Most of the species are known as sparrows, but these birds are not closely related to the Old World sparrows which are in the family Passeridae. Many of these have distinctive head patterns. Thirty-nine species have been recorded in Colombia.

- Tanager finch, Oreothraupis arremonops (Sclater, PL, 1855)
- Yellow-throated chlorospingus, Chlorospingus flavigularis (Sclater, PL, 1852)
- Short-billed chlorospingus, Chlorospingus parvirostris Chapman, 1901
- Ashy-throated chlorospingus, Chlorospingus canigularis (Lafresnaye, 1848)
- Common chlorospingus, Chlorospingus flavopectus (Lafresnaye, 1840)
- Tacarcuna chlorospingus, Chlorospingus tacarcunae Griscom, 1924
- Dusky chlorospingus, Chlorospingus semifuscus Sclater, PL & Salvin, 1873
- Grasshopper sparrow, Ammodramus savannarum (Gmelin, JF, 1789)
- Grassland sparrow, Ammodramus humeralis (Bosc, 1792)
- Yellow-browed sparrow, Ammodramus aurifrons (Spix, 1825)
- Black-striped sparrow, Arremonops conirostris (Bonaparte, 1850)
- Tocuyo sparrow, Arremonops tocuyensis Todd, 1912
- Sierra Nevada brushfinch, Arremon basilicus (Bangs, 1898) (E)
- Perija brushfinch, Arremon perijanus (Phelps, WH & Gilliard, 1940)
- Black-headed brushfinch, Arremon atricapillus (Lawrence, 1874)
- Gray-browed brushfinch, Arremon assimilis (Boissonneau, 1840)
- Orange-billed sparrow, Arremon aurantiirostris Lafresnaye, 1847
- Golden-winged sparrow, Arremon schlegeli Bonaparte, 1850
- Yellow-mandibled sparrow, Arremon axillaris (Sclater, PL, 1854)
- Pectoral sparrow, Arremon taciturnus (Hermann, 1783)
- Chestnut-capped brushfinch, Arremon brunneinucha (Lafresnaye, 1839)
- Sooty-faced finch, Arremon crassirostris (Cassin, 1865)
- Olive finch, Arremon castaneiceps (Sclater, PL, 1860)
- Clay-colored sparrow, Spizella pallida (Swainson, 1832) (V)
- Rufous-collared sparrow, Zonotrichia capensis (Müller, PLS, 1776)
- Lincoln's sparrow, Melospiza lincolnii (Audubon, 1834) (V)
- Savannah sparrow, Passerculus sandwichensis (Gmelin, JF, 1789) (SA) (U)
- White-naped brushfinch, Atlapetes albinucha (d'Orbigny & Lafresnaye, 1838)
- Moustached brushfinch, Atlapetes albofrenatus (Boissonneau, 1840)
- Santa Marta brushfinch, Atlapetes melanocephalus (Salvin & Godman, 1880) (E)
- Ochre-breasted brushfinch, Atlapetes semirufus (Boissonneau, 1840)
- Yellow-headed brushfinch, Atlapetes flaviceps Chapman, 1912 (E)
- Dusky-headed brushfinch, Atlapetes fuscoolivaceus Chapman, 1914 (E)
- White-rimmed brushfinch, Atlapetes leucopis (Sclater, PL & Salvin, 1878)
- Tricolored brushfinch, Atlapetes tricolor (Taczanowski, 1875)
- Slaty brushfinch, Atlapetes schistaceus (Boissonneau, 1840)
- Pale-naped brushfinch, Atlapetes pallidinucha (Boissonneau, 1840)
- Antioquia brushfinch, Atlapetes blancae Donegan, 2007 (E) CR
- Yellow-breasted brushfinch, Atlapetes latinuchus (Du Bus de Gisignies, 1855)

== Blackbirds ==
Order: Passeriformes Family: Icteridae

The icterids are a group of small to medium-sized, often colorful, passerine birds restricted to the New World and include the grackles, New World blackbirds, and New World orioles. Most species have black as the predominant plumage color, often enlivened by yellow, orange, or red. Forty-two species have been recorded in Colombia; this is the greatest number of icterids in any country.

- Yellow-headed blackbird, Xanthocephalus xanthocephalus (Bonaparte, 182653) (V)
- Bobolink, Dolichonyx oryzivorus (Linnaeus, 1758)
- Eastern meadowlark, Sturnella magna (Linnaeus, 1758)
- Red-breasted meadowlark, Leistes militaris (Linnaeus, 1758)
- Peruvian meadowlark, Leistes bellicosus (de Filippi, 1847)
- Yellow-billed cacique, Amblycercus holosericeus (Deppe, 1830)
- Russet-backed oropendola, Psarocolius angustifrons (Spix, 1824)
- Green oropendola, Psarocolius viridis (Müller, PLS, 1776)
- Chestnut-headed oropendola, Psarocolius wagleri (Gray, GR, 1844)
- Crested oropendola, Psarocolius decumanus (Pallas, 1769)
- Black oropendola, Psarocolius guatimozinus (Bonaparte, 1853)
- Baudo oropendola, Psarocolius cassini (Richmond, 1898) (E)
- Olive oropendola, Psarocolius bifasciatus (Spix, 1824)
- Solitary black cacique, Cacicus solitarius Vieillot, 1816
- Ecuadorian cacique, Cacicus sclateri (Dubois, AJC, 1887)
- Scarlet-rumped cacique, Cacicus uropygialis Lafresnaye, 1843
- Yellow-rumped cacique, Cacicus cela (Linnaeus, 1758)
- Mountain cacique, Cacicus chrysonotus d'Orbigny & Lafresnaye, 1838
- Band-tailed cacique, Cacicus latirostris Swainson, 1838
- Red-rumped cacique, Cacicus haemorrhous (Linnaeus, 1766)
- Casqued cacique, Cacicus oseryi Deville, 1849
- Venezuelan troupial, Icterus icterus (Linnaeus, 1766)
- Orange-backed troupial, Icterus croconotus (Wagler, 1829)
- Yellow-tailed oriole, Icterus mesomelas (Wagler, 1829)
- Epaulet oriole, Icterus cayanensis (Linnaeus, 1766)
- Orchard oriole, Icterus spurius (Linnaeus, 1766)
- Orange-crowned oriole, Icterus auricapillus Cassin, 1848
- Yellow-backed oriole, Icterus chrysater (Lesson, RP, 1844)
- Baltimore oriole, Icterus galbula (Linnaeus, 1758)
- Yellow oriole, Icterus nigrogularis (Hahn, 1819)
- Jamaican oriole, Icterus leucopteryx (Wagler, 1827) (SA)
- Giant cowbird, Molothrus oryzivorus (Gmelin, JF, 1788)
- Bronzed cowbird, Molothrus aeneus (Wagler, 1829) (see note) (Note: Some authorities including BirdLife International and the International Ornithological Congress consider the birds found in Colombia to be bronze-brown cowbirds—a distinct species.)
- Shiny cowbird, Molothrus bonariensis (Gmelin, JF, 1789)
- Scrub blackbird, Dives warczewiczi (Cabanis, 1861)
- Carib grackle, Quiscalus lugubris Swainson, 1838
- Great-tailed grackle, Quiscalus mexicanus (Gmelin, JF, 1788)
- Velvet-fronted grackle, Lampropsar tanagrinus (Spix, 1824)
- Red-bellied grackle, Hypopyrrhus pyrohypogaster (de Tarragon, L, 1847) (E)
- Oriole blackbird, Gymnomystax mexicanus (Linnaeus, 1766)
- Mountain grackle, Macroagelaius subalaris (Boissonneau, 1840) (E)
- Yellow-hooded blackbird, Chrysomus icterocephalus (Linnaeus, 1766)

== Wood-warblers ==
Order: Passeriformes Family: Parulidae

The wood-warblers are a group of small, often colorful, passerine birds restricted to the New World. Most are arboreal, but some are terrestrial. Most members of this family are insectivores. Fifty-six species have been recorded in Colombia.

- Ovenbird, Seiurus aurocapilla (Linnaeus, 1766)
- Worm-eating warbler, Helmitheros vermivorum (Gmelin, JF, 1789)
- Louisiana waterthrush, Parkesia motacilla (Vieillot, 1809)
- Northern waterthrush, Parkesia noveboracensis (Gmelin, JF, 1789)
- Golden-winged warbler, Vermivora chrysoptera (Linnaeus, 1766)
- Blue-winged warbler, Vermivora cyanoptera Olson & Reveal, 2009
- Black-and-white warbler, Mniotilta varia (Linnaeus, 1766)
- Prothonotary warbler, Protonotaria citrea (Boddaert, 1783)
- Swainson's warbler, Limnothlypis swainsonii (Audubon, 1834) (SA)
- Tennessee warbler, Leiothlypis peregrina
- Nashville warbler, Oreothlypis ruficapilla (SA)
- Connecticut warbler, Oporornis agilis (Wilson, A, 1812)
- Masked yellowthroat, Geothlypis aequinoctialis (Gmelin, JF, 1789)
- Mourning warbler, Geothlypis philadelphia (Wilson, A, 1810)
- Kentucky warbler, Geothlypis formosa (Wilson, A, 1811)
- Olive-crowned yellowthroat, Geothlypis semiflava Sclater, PL, 1860
- Common yellowthroat, Geothlypis trichas (Linnaeus, 1766) (V)
- Hooded warbler, Setophaga citrina (Boddaert, 1783) (V)
- American redstart, Setophaga ruticilla (Linnaeus, 1758)
- Cape May warbler, Setophaga tigrina (Gmelin, JF, 1789) (V)
- Cerulean warbler, Setophaga cerulea (Wilson, A, 1810)
- Northern parula, Setophaga americana (Linnaeus, 1758)
- Tropical parula, Setophaga pitiayumi (Vieillot, 1817)
- Magnolia warbler, Setophaga magnolia (Wilson, A, 1811) (V)
- Bay-breasted warbler, Setophaga castanea (Wilson, A, 1810)
- Blackburnian warbler, Setophaga fusca (Müller, PLS, 1776)
- Yellow warbler, Setophaga petechia (Linnaeus, 1766)
- Chestnut-sided warbler, Setophaga pensylvanica (Linnaeus, 1766)
- Blackpoll warbler, Setophaga striata (Forster, JR, 1772)
- Black-throated blue warbler, Setophaga caerulescens (Gmelin, JF, 1789) (V)
- Palm warbler, Setophaga palmarum (Gmelin, JF, 1789) (V)
- Pine warbler, Setophaga pinus (Linnaeus, 1766) (SA)
- Yellow-rumped warbler, Setophaga coronata (Linnaeus, 1766) (V)
- Yellow-throated warbler, Setophaga dominica (Linnaeus, 1766) (V)
- Prairie warbler, Setophaga discolor (Vieillot, 1809) (V)
- Townsend's warbler, Setophaga townsendi (Townsend, JK, 1837) (V)
- Black-throated green warbler, Setophaga virens (Gmelin, JF, 1789) (V)
- Citrine warbler, Myiothlypis luteoviridis (Bonaparte, 1845)
- Santa Marta warbler, Myiothlypis basilica (Todd, 1913) (E)
- Flavescent warbler, Myiothlypis flaveola Baird, SF, 1865
- Black-crested warbler, Myiothlypis nigrocristata (Lafresnaye, 1840)
- Buff-rumped warbler, Myiothlypis fulvicauda (Spix, 1825)
- Golden-bellied warbler, Myiothlypis chrysogaster (Tschudi, 1844)
- White-lored warbler, Myiothlypis conspicillata (Salvin & Godman, 1880) (E)
- Gray-throated warbler, Myiothlypis cinereicollis (Sclater, PL, 1864)
- Russet-crowned warbler, Myiothlypis coronata (Tschudi, 1844)
- Chestnut-capped warbler, Basileuterus delattrii Bonaparte, 1854
- Golden-crowned warbler, Basileuterus culicivorus (Deppe, 1830)
- Pirre warbler, Basileuterus ignotus Nelson, 1912
- Three-striped warbler, Basileuterus tristriatus (Tschudi, 1844)
- Canada warbler, Cardellina canadensis (Linnaeus, 1766)
- Wilson's warbler, Cardellina pusilla (Wilson, A, 1811) (V)
- Slate-throated whitestart, Myioborus miniatus (Swainson, 1827)
- Yellow-crowned whitestart, Myioborus flavivertex (Salvin, 1887) (E)
- Golden-fronted whitestart, Myioborus ornatus (Boissonneau, 1840)
- Spectacled whitestart, Myioborus melanocephalus (Tschudi, 1844)

== Mitrospingids ==
Order: Passeriformes Family: Mitrospingidae

Until 2017 the four species in this family were included in the family Thraupidae, the "true" tanagers.

- Dusky-faced tanager, Mitrospingus cassinii (Lawrence, 1861)

== Cardinal grosbeaks ==
Order: Passeriformes Family: Cardinalidae

The cardinals are a family of robust, seed-eating birds with strong bills. They are typically associated with open woodland. The sexes usually have distinct plumages. Twenty-seven species have been recorded in Colombia.

- Hepatic tanager, Piranga flava (Vieillot, 1822)
- Summer tanager, Piranga rubra (Linnaeus, 1758)
- Scarlet tanager, Piranga olivacea (Gmelin, JF, 1789)
- Red-hooded tanager, Piranga rubriceps Gray, GR, 1844
- White-winged tanager, Piranga leucoptera Trudeau, 1839
- Red-throated ant-tanager, Driophlox fuscicauda (Cabanis, 1861)
- Sooty ant-tanager, Driophlox gutturalis (Sclater, PL, 1854) (E)
- Crested ant-tanager, Driophlox cristata (Lawrence, 1875) (E)
- Red-crowned ant-tanager, Habia rubica (Vieillot, 1817)
- Ochre-breasted tanager, Chlorothraupis stolzmanni (Berlepsch & Taczanowski, 1884)
- Carmiol's tanager, Chlorothraupis carmioli (Lawrence, 1868)
- Lemon-spectacled tanager, Chlorothraupis olivacea (Cassin, 1860)
- Yellow-lored tanager, Chlorothraupis frenata Berlepsch, 1907
- Golden grosbeak, Pheucticus chrysogaster (Lesson, RP, 1832)
- Black-backed grosbeak, Pheucticus aureoventris (d'Orbigny & Lafresnaye, 1837)
- Rose-breasted grosbeak, Pheucticus ludovicianus (Linnaeus, 1766)
- Rose-breasted chat, Granatellus pelzelni Sclater, PL, 1865
- Vermilion cardinal, Cardinalis phoeniceus Bonaparte, 1838
- Yellow-green grosbeak, Caryothraustes canadensis (Linnaeus, 1766)
- Ecuadorian seedeater, Amaurospiza aequatorialis Sharpe, 1888
- Blue-black grosbeak, Cyanoloxia cyanoides (Lafresnaye, 1847)
- Amazonian grosbeak, Cyanoloxia rothschildii (Bartlett, E, 1890)
- Ultramarine grosbeak, Cyanoloxia brissonii (Lichtenstein, MHC, 1823)
- Blue grosbeak, Passerina caerulea (Linnaeus, 1758) (V)
- Indigo bunting, Passerina cyanea (Linnaeus, 1766) (V)
- Painted bunting, Passerina ciris (Linnaeus, 1758) (SA)
- Dickcissel, Spiza americana (Gmelin, JF, 1789)

== Tanagers ==
Order: Passeriformes Family: Thraupidae

The tanagers are a large group of small to medium-sized passerine birds restricted to the New World, mainly in the tropics. Many species are brightly colored. As a family they are omnivorous, but individual species specialize in eating fruits, seeds, insects, or other types of food. Most have short, rounded wings. Colombia has the greatest diversity of tanagers of any country. One hundred eighty species have been recorded there.

- Hooded tanager, Nemosia pileata (Boddaert, 1783)
- White-capped tanager, Sericossypha albocristata (Lafresnaye, 1843)
- Yellow-shouldered grosbeak, Parkerthraustes humeralis (Lawrence, 1867)
- Plushcap, Catamblyrhynchus diadema Lafresnaye, 1842
- Green honeycreeper, Chlorophanes spiza (Linnaeus, 1758)
- Golden-collared honeycreeper, Iridophanes pulcherrimus (Sclater, PL, 1853)
- Black-and-yellow tanager, Chrysothlypis chrysomelas (Sclater, PL & Salvin, 1869)
- Scarlet-and-white tanager, Chrysothlypis salmoni (Sclater, PL, 1886)
- Scarlet-browed tanager, Heterospingus xanthopygius (Sclater, PL, 1855)
- Guira tanager, Hemithraupis guira (Linnaeus, 1766)
- Yellow-backed tanager, Hemithraupis flavicollis (Vieillot, 1818)
- Bicolored conebill, Conirostrum bicolor (Vieillot, 1809)
- Pearly-breasted conebill, Conirostrum margaritae Holt, EG, 1931
- Chestnut-vented conebill, Conirostrum speciosum (Temminck, 1824)
- White-eared conebill, Conirostrum leucogenys (Lafresnaye, 1852)
- Giant conebill, Conirostrum binghami (Chapman, 1919)
- Blue-backed conebill, Conirostrum sitticolor Lafresnaye, 1840
- Capped conebill, Conirostrum albifrons Lafresnaye, 1842
- Rufous-browed conebill, Conirostrum rufum Lafresnaye, 1843
- Cinereous conebill, Conirostrum cinereum d'Orbigny & Lafresnaye, 1838
- Stripe-tailed yellow-finch, Sicalis citrina Pelzeln, 1870
- Orange-fronted yellow-finch, Sicalis columbiana Cabanis, 1851
- Saffron finch, Sicalis flaveola (Linnaeus, 1766)
- Grassland yellow-finch, Sicalis luteola (Sparrman, 1789)
- Plumbeous sierra finch, Geospizopsis unicolor (d'Orbigny & Lafresnaye, 1837)
- Band-tailed seedeater, Catamenia analis (d'Orbigny & Lafresnaye, 1837)
- Plain-colored seedeater, Catamenia inornata (Lafresnaye, 1847)
- Paramo seedeater, Catamenia homochroa Sclater, PL, 1859
- Chestnut-bellied flowerpiercer, Diglossa gloriosissima Chapman, 1912 (E)
- Glossy flowerpiercer, Diglossa lafresnayii (Boissonneau, 1840)
- Black flowerpiercer, Diglossa humeralis (Fraser, 1840)
- Black-throated flowerpiercer, Diglossa brunneiventris Lafresnaye, 1846
- White-sided flowerpiercer, Diglossa albilatera Lafresnaye, 1843
- Indigo flowerpiercer, Diglossa indigotica Sclater, PL, 1856
- Rusty flowerpiercer, Diglossa sittoides (d'Orbigny & Lafresnaye, 1838)
- Deep-blue flowerpiercer, Diglossa glauca Sclater, PL & Salvin, 1876
- Bluish flowerpiercer, Diglossa caerulescens (Sclater, PL, 1856)
- Warbling masked-flowerpiercer, Diglossa cyanea (Lafresnaye, 1840)
- Slaty finch, Haplospiza rustica (Tschudi, 1844)
- Blue-black grassquit, Volatinia jacarina (Linnaeus, 1766)
- Black-and-white tanager, Conothraupis speculigera (Gould, 1855) (V)
- Rufous-crested tanager, Creurgops verticalis Sclater, PL, 1858
- Flame-crested tanager, Loriotus cristatus (Linnaeus, 1766)
- White-shouldered tanager, Loriotus luctuosus (d'Orbigny & Lafresnaye, 1837)
- Fulvous-crested tanager, Tachyphonus surinamus (Linnaeus, 1766)
- Tawny-crested tanager, Tachyphonus delatrii Lafresnaye, 1847
- White-lined tanager, Tachyphonus rufus (Boddaert, 1783)
- Red-shouldered tanager, Tachyphonus phoenicius Swainson, 1838
- Gray-headed tanager, Eucometis penicillata (Spix, 1825)
- Pileated finch, Coryphospingus pileatus (Wied-Neuwied, M, 1821)
- Red-crested finch, Coryphospingus cucullatus (Müller, PLS, 1776)
- Masked crimson tanager, Ramphocelus nigrogularis (Spix, 1825)
- Crimson-backed tanager, Ramphocelus dimidiatus Lafresnaye, 1837
- Silver-beaked tanager, Ramphocelus carbo (Pallas, 1764)
- Flame-rumped tanager, Ramphocelus flammigerus (Jardine & Selby, 1833)
- Fulvous shrike-tanager, Lanio fulvus (Boddaert, 1783)
- Crimson-breasted finch, Rhodospingus cruentus (Lesson, RP, 1844) (U)
- Short-billed honeycreeper, Cyanerpes nitidus (Hartlaub, 1847)
- Shining honeycreeper, Cyanerpes lucidus (Sclater, PL & Salvin, 1859)
- Purple honeycreeper, Cyanerpes caeruleus (Linnaeus, 1758)
- Red-legged honeycreeper, Cyanerpes cyaneus (Linnaeus, 1766)
- Swallow tanager, Tersina viridis (Illiger, 1811)
- White-bellied dacnis, Dacnis albiventris (Sclater, PL, 1852)
- Yellow-tufted dacnis, Dacnis egregia Sclater, PL, 1855
- Black-faced dacnis, Dacnis lineata (Gmelin, JF, 1789)
- Yellow-bellied dacnis, Dacnis flaviventer d'Orbigny & Lafresnaye, 1837
- Turquoise dacnis, Dacnis hartlaubi Sclater, PL, 1855 (E)
- Scarlet-thighed dacnis, Dacnis venusta Lawrence, 1862
- Blue dacnis, Dacnis cayana (Linnaeus, 1766)
- Viridian dacnis, Dacnis viguieri Oustalet, 1883
- Scarlet-breasted dacnis, Dacnis berlepschi Hartert, EJO, 1900
- Lesson's seedeater, Sporophila bouvronides (Lesson, RP, 1831)
- Lined seedeater, Sporophila lineola (Linnaeus, 1758)
- Chestnut-throated seedeater, Sporophila telasco (Lesson, RP, 1828)
- Chestnut-bellied seedeater, Sporophila castaneiventris Cabanis, 1849
- Ruddy-breasted seedeater, Sporophila minuta (Linnaeus, 1758)
- Thick-billed seed-finch, Sporophila funerea (Sclater, PL, 1860)
- Chestnut-bellied seed-finch, Sporophila angolensis (Linnaeus, 1766)
- Great-billed seed-finch, Sporophila maximiliani Cabanis, 1851
- Large-billed seed-finch, Sporophila crassirostris (Gmelin, JF, 1789)
- Black-billed seed-finch, Sporophila atrirostris (Sclater, PL & Salvin, 1878)
- Variable seedeater, Sporophila corvina (Sclater, PL, 1860)
- Gray seedeater, Sporophila intermedia Cabanis, 1851
- Wing-barred seedeater, Sporophila americana (Gmelin, JF, 1789)
- White-naped seedeater, Sporophila fringilloides (Pelzeln, 1870)
- Black-and-white seedeater, Sporophila luctuosa (Lafresnaye, 1843)
- Yellow-bellied seedeater, Sporophila nigricollis (Vieillot, 1823)
- Double-collared seedeater, Sporophila caerulescens (Vieillot, 1823)
- Slate-colored seedeater, Sporophila schistacea (Lawrence, 1862)
- Plumbeous seedeater, Sporophila plumbea (Wied-Neuwied, M, 1830)
- Buff-throated saltator, Saltator maximus (Müller, PLS, 1776)
- Black-winged saltator, Saltator atripennis Sclater, PL, 1857
- Orinocan saltator, Saltator orenocensis Lafresnaye, 1846
- Olive-gray saltator, Saltator olivascens Cabanis, 1849
- Bluish-gray saltator, Saltator coerulescens Vieillot, 1817
- Streaked saltator, Saltator striatipectus Lafresnaye, 1847
- Masked saltator, Saltator cinctus Zimmer, JT, 1943
- Slate-colored grosbeak, Saltator grossus (Linnaeus, 1766)
- Wedge-tailed grass-finch, Emberizoides herbicola (Vieillot, 1817)
- Black-headed hemispingus, Pseudospingus verticalis (Lafresnaye, 1840)
- Pink-billed cnemoscopus, Cnemoscopus rubrirostris (Lafresnaye, 1840)
- Black-capped hemispingus, Kleinothraupis atropileus (Lafresnaye, 1842)
- Oleaginous hemispingus, Sphenopsis frontalis (Tschudi, 1844)
- Black-eared hemispingus, Sphenopsis melanotis (Sclater, PL, 1855)
- Orange-headed tanager, Thlypopsis sordida (d'Orbigny & Lafresnaye, 1837)
- Fulvous-headed tanager, Thlypopsis fulviceps Cabanis, 1851
- Superciliaried hemispingus, Thlypopsis superciliaris (Lafresnaye, 1840)
- Rufous-chested tanager, Thlypopsis ornata (Sclater, PL, 1859)
- Black-backed bush tanager, Urothraupis stolzmanni Taczanowski & Berlepsch, 1885
- Bananaquit, Coereba flaveola (Linnaeus, 1758)
- Yellow-faced grassquit, Tiaris olivaceus (Linnaeus, 1766)
- Dull-colored grassquit, Asemospiza obscura (d'Orbigny & Lafresnaye, 1837)
- Sooty grassquit, Asemospiza fuliginosa (Wied-Neuwied, M, 1830)
- Black-faced grassquit, Melanospiza bicolor (Linnaeus, 1766)
- Glistening-green tanager, Chlorochrysa phoenicotis (Bonaparte, 1851)
- Orange-eared tanager, Chlorochrysa calliparaea (Tschudi, 1844)
- Multicolored tanager, Chlorochrysa nitidissima Sclater, PL, 1874 (E)
- Masked cardinal, Paroaria nigrogenis (Lafresnaye, 1846)
- Red-capped cardinal, Paroaria gularis (Linnaeus, 1766)
- Black-faced tanager, Schistochlamys melanopis (Latham, 1790)
- Magpie tanager, Cissopis leverianus (Gmelin, JF, 1788)
- Vermilion tanager, Calochaetes coccineus (Sclater, PL, 1858)
- Purplish-mantled tanager, Iridosornis porphyrocephalus Sclater, PL, 1856
- Yellow-throated tanager, Iridosornis analis (Tschudi, 1844)
- Golden-crowned tanager, Iridosornis rufivertex (Lafresnaye, 1842)
- Fawn-breasted tanager, Pipraeidea melanonota (Vieillot, 1819)
- Carriker's mountain tanager, Dubusia carrikeri Wetmore, 1946 (E)
- Buff-banded mountain tanager, Dubusia taeniata (Boissonneau, 1840)
- Black-cheeked mountain tanager, Anisognathus melanogenys (Salvin & Godman, 1880) (E)
- Lacrimose mountain tanager, Anisognathus lacrymosus (Du Bus de Gisignies, 1846)
- Scarlet-bellied mountain tanager, Anisognathus igniventris (d'Orbigny & Lafresnaye, 1837)
- Blue-winged mountain tanager, Anisognathus somptuosus (Lesson, RP, 1831)
- Black-chinned mountain tanager, Anisognathus notabilis (Sclater, PL, 1855)
- Hooded mountain tanager, Buthraupis montana (d'Orbigny & Lafresnaye, 1837)
- Masked mountain tanager, Tephrophilus wetmorei Moore, RT, 1934
- Blue-capped tanager, Sporathraupis cyanocephala (d'Orbigny & Lafresnaye, 1837)
- Grass-green tanager, Chlorornis riefferii (Boissonneau, 1840)
- Black-chested mountain tanager, Cnemathraupis eximia (Boissonneau, 1840)
- Yellow-green tanager, Bangsia flavovirens (Lawrence, 1867)
- Blue-and-gold tanager, Bangsia arcaei (Sclater, PL & Salvin, 1869)
- Black-and-gold tanager, Bangsia melanochlamys (Hellmayr, 1910) (E)
- Golden-chested tanager, Bangsia rothschildi (Berlepsch, 1897)
- Moss-backed tanager, Bangsia edwardsi (Elliot, DG, 1865)
- Gold-ringed tanager, Bangsia aureocincta (Hellmayr, 1910) (E)
- Golden-naped tanager, Chalcothraupis ruficervix (Prévost & des Murs, 1842)
- Gray-and-gold tanager, Poecilostreptus palmeri (Hellmayr, 1909)
- Black-headed tanager, Stilpnia cyanoptera (Swainson, 1834)
- Black-capped tanager, Stilpnia heinei (Cabanis, 1851)
- Burnished-buff tanager, Stilpnia cayana (Linnaeus, 1766)
- Scrub tanager, Stilpnia vitriolina (Cabanis, 1851)
- Masked tanager, Stilpnia nigrocincta (Bonaparte, 1838)
- Golden-hooded tanager, Stilpnia larvata (Du Bus de Gisignies, 1846)
- Blue-necked tanager, Stilpnia cyanicollis (d'Orbigny & Lafresnaye, 1837)
- Blue-and-black tanager, Tangara vassorii (Boissonneau, 1840)
- Beryl-spangled tanager, Tangara nigroviridis (Lafresnaye, 1843)
- Metallic-green tanager, Tangara labradorides (Boissonneau, 1840)
- Blue-browed tanager, Tangara cyanotis (Sclater, PL, 1858)
- Plain-colored tanager, Tangara inornata (Gould, 1855)
- Turquoise tanager, Tangara mexicana (Linnaeus, 1766)
- Paradise tanager, Tangara chilensis (Vigors, 1832)
- Opal-rumped tanager, Tangara velia (Linnaeus, 1758)
- Opal-crowned tanager, Tangara callophrys (Cabanis, 1849)
- Rufous-winged tanager, Tangara lavinia (Cassin, 1858)
- Bay-headed tanager, Tangara gyrola (Linnaeus, 1758)
- Golden-eared tanager, Tangara chrysotis (Du Bus de Gisignies, 1846)
- Saffron-crowned tanager, Tangara xanthocephala (Tschudi, 1844)
- Flame-faced tanager, Tangara parzudakii (Lafresnaye, 1843)
- Green-and-gold tanager, Tangara schrankii (Spix, 1825)
- Blue-whiskered tanager, Tangara johannae (Dalmas, 1900)
- Golden tanager, Tangara arthus Lesson, RP, 1832
- Emerald tanager, Tangara florida (Sclater, PL & Salvin, 1869)
- Silver-throated tanager, Tangara icterocephala (Bonaparte, 1851)
- Blue-gray tanager, Thraupis episcopus (Linnaeus, 1766)
- Glaucous tanager, Thraupis glaucocolpa Cabanis, 1851
- Palm tanager, Thraupis palmarum (Wied-Neuwied, M, 1821)
- Dotted tanager, Ixothraupis varia' (Müller, PLS, 1776)
- Rufous-throated tanager, Ixothraupis rufigula (Bonaparte, 1851)
- Speckled tanager, Ixothraupis guttata (Cabanis, 1851)
- Yellow-bellied tanager, Ixothraupis xanthogastra (Sclater, PL, 1851)
- Spotted tanager, Ixothraupis punctata (Linnaeus, 1766)

== See also ==
- Endemic Birds of Colombia
- List of birds
- Lists of birds by region
