= Endemic birds of Colombia =

The following is a list of the 83 known endemic bird species in Colombia (about 4% of Colombian species) with notes about their general distribution. Twenty-three (28%) of the species are found only in the Sierra Nevada de Santa Marta, an isolated mountain range in northern Colombia with a very high degree of endemism.

== Endemic bird list ==
Scientific name	Common name	Status	Distribution
Cracidae
Ortalis garrula	Chestnut-winged chachalaca		Caribbean Region between Sierra Nevada de Santa Marta and the Sinú River
Ortalis columbiana	Colombian chachalaca		Slopes of the Inter-Andean Valleys
Penelope perspicax	Cauca guan	Endangered	Slopes of West & Central Andes (Valle del Cauca, Risaralda, Quindío, Cauca)
Crax alberti	Blue-billed curassow	Critically endangered	Spottily in forested mountains of northern Colombia
Odontophoridae
Odontophorus hyperythrus	Chestnut wood-quail	Near threatened	Slope of West and Central Andes
Odontophorus strophium	Gorgeted wood-quail	Endangered	West slope of East Andes
Columbidae
Leptotila conoveri	Tolima dove	Endangered	East slope of Central Andes (Tolima, Huila)
Trochilidae
Ramphomicron dorsale	Black-backed thornbill	Endangered	Sierra Nevada de Santa Marta
Oxypogon stuebelii	Buffy helmetcrest	Vulnerable	Central Andes páramo
Oxypogon cyanolaemus	Blue-bearded helmetcrest	Critically endangered	Sierra Nevada de Santa Marta
Oxypogon guerinii	Green-bearded helmetcrest		East Andes páramo
Eriocnemis isabellae	Gorgeted puffleg	Critically endangered	Serranía del Pinche, Cauca
Eriocnemis mirabilis	Colorful puffleg	Critically endangered	West Andes in Cauca
Coeligena prunellei	Black inca	Vulnerable	West slope of East Andes (Cundinamarca, Boyacá, Santander)
Coeligena phalerata	White-tailed starfrontlet	Near threatened	Sierra Nevada de Santa Marta
Coeligena orina	Dusky starfrontlet	Critically endangered	Spottily in the northern West Andes
Chaetocercus astreans	Santa Marta woodstar		Sierra Nevada de Santa Marta
Chlorostilbon olivaresi	Chiribiquete emerald		Serranía de Chiribiquete, Amazon Region
Anthocephala floriceps	Santa Marta blossomcrown	Vulnerable	Sierra Nevada de Santa Marta
Anthocephala berlepschi	Tolima blossomcrown		Central Andes (Quindío, Tolima, Huila)
Campylopterus phainopeplus	Santa Marta sabrewing	Endangered	Sierra Nevada de Santa Marta
Amazilia castaneiventris	Chestnut-bellied hummingbird	Endangered	Drier areas of the Magdalena River drainage (Boyacá, Santander)
Amazilia cyanifrons	Indigo-capped hummingbird		Central Colombia (Upper Magdalena Valley into East Andes)
Lepidopyga lilliae	Sapphire-bellied hummingbird	Critically endangered	Caribbean coast (Atlántico, Magdalena, La Guajira)
Rallidae
Rallus semiplumbeus	Bogota rail	Endangered	High wetlands in East Andes (Cundinamarca, Boyacá)
Strigidae
Megascops gilesi	Santa Marta screech owl	Vulnerable	Sierra Nevada de Santa Marta
Bucconidae
Bucco noanamae	Sooty-capped puffbird	Near threatened	Northwest Colombia (Chocó, Antioquia)
Capitonidae
Capito hypoleucus	White-mantled barbet	Vulnerable	North Central Andes & west slope of East Andes
Picidae
Picumnus granadensis	Grayish piculet		Cauca Valley slopes and lowlands
Melanerpes pulcher	Beautiful woodpecker		North Central Andes & west slope of East Andes; Magdalena Valley
Psittacidae
Bolborhynchus ferrugineifrons	Rufous-fronted parakeet	Vulnerable	Central Andes (Los Nevados National Park)
Hapalopsittaca fuertesi	Indigo-winged parrot	Critically endangered	Central Andes (Risaralda, Tolima, Quindío)
Pyrrhura viridicata	Santa Marta parakeet	Endangered	Sierra Nevada de Santa Marta
Pyrrhura calliptera	Brown-breasted parakeet	Vulnerable	Spottily in northern East Andes
Ognorhynchus icterotis	Yellow-eared parrot	Endangered	Few locations in the Colombian Andes
Thamnophilidae
Drymophila caudata	East Andean antbird	Near threatened	West slope of East Andes; Upper Magdalena Valley (Caquetá, Huila)
Drymophila hellmayri	Santa Marta antbird	Near threatened	Sierra Nevada de Santa Marta
Cercomacra parkeri	Parker's antbird		Central Andes; small area of central West Andes
Grallariidae
Grallaria bangsi	Santa Marta antpitta	Vulnerable	Sierra Nevada de Santa Marta
Grallaria kaestneri	Cundinamarca antpitta	Endangered	East slope of East Andes (Cundinamarca)
Grallaria urraoensis	Urrao antpitta	Critically endangered	Páramo de Frontino, West Andes (Antioquia)
Grallaria milleri	Brown-banded antpitta	Vulnerable	Central Andes (Caldas, Tolima, Risaralda, Quindío)
Rhinocryptidae
Scytalopus sanctaemartae	Santa Marta tapaculo		Sierra Nevada de Santa Marta
Scytalopus rodriguezi	Magdalena tapaculo	Endangered	East slope of Central Andes, Upper Magdalena Valley
Scytalopus stilesi	Stiles's tapaculo		Northern Central Andes (Antioquia, Caldas, Risaralda)
Scytalopus alvarezlopezi	Tatama tapaculo	Near threatened	West slope of West Andes (Antioquia to Valle del Cauca)
Scytalopus latebricola	Brown-rumped tapaculo	Near threatened	Sierra Nevada de Santa Marta
Scytalopus canus	Paramillo tapaculo	Endangered	Northern West Andes (Antioquia)
Furnariidae
Clibanornis rufipectus	Santa Marta foliage-gleaner	Near threatened	Sierra Nevada de Santa Marta
Cranioleuca hellmayri	Streak-capped spinetail		Sierra Nevada de Santa Marta
Synallaxis subpudica	Silvery-throated spinetail		East Andes (Cundinamarca, Boyacá)
Synallaxis fuscorufa	Rusty-headed spinetail	Vulnerable	Sierra Nevada de Santa Marta
Tyrannidae
Phylloscartes lanyoni	Antioquia bristle-tyrant	Endangered	Central Andes (Antioquia, Caldas); west slope of East Andes (Cundinamarca, Boyacá)
Myiotheretes pernix	Santa Marta bush-tyrant	Endangered	Sierra Nevada de Santa Marta
Myiarchus apicalis	Apical flycatcher		Inter-Andean Valleys and adjacent slopes
Cotingidae
Lipaugus weberi	Chestnut-capped piha	Endangered	Northern Central Andes
Vireonidae
Vireo caribaeus	San Andres vireo	Vulnerable	San Andres Island
Troglodytidae
Troglodytes monticola	Santa Marta wren	Critically endangered	Sierra Nevada de Santa Marta
Cistothorus apolinari	Apolinar's wren	Endangered	East Andes (Cundinamarca, Boyacá)
Thryophilus sernai	Antioquia wren	Endangered	Dry forest along Cauca River (Antioquia)
Thryophilus nicefori	Niceforo's wren	Critically endangered	West slope of East Andes (Santander, Boyacá)
Henicorhina anachoreta	Hermit wood wren	Near threatened	Sierra Nevada de Santa Marta
Henicorhina negreti	Munchique wood wren	Critically endangered	Spottily in the West Andes
Fringillidae
Euphonia concinna	Velvet-fronted euphonia		Magdalena Valley
Passerellidae
Arremon basilicus	Sierra Nevada brushfinch	Near threatened	Sierra Nevada de Santa Marta
Atlapetes melanocephalus	Santa Marta brushfinch		Sierra Nevada de Santa Marta
Atlapetes flaviceps	Yellow-headed brushfinch	Endangered	East slope of Central Andes (Huila, Tolima)
Atlapetes fuscoolivaceus	Dusky-headed brushfinch	Near threatened	Upper Magdalena Valley (Huila, Cauca)
Atlapetes blancae	Antioquia brushfinch	Critically endangered	Northern Central Andes (Antioquia)
Icteridae
Psarocolius cassini	Baudo oropendola	Endangered	Coastal mountains of the Pacific Region, Choc[o
Hypopyrrhus pyrohypogaster	Red-bellied grackle	Vulnerable	Spottily in Andes
Macroagelaius subalaris	Colombian mountain grackle	Endangered	West slope of East Andes
Parulidae
Basileuterus basilicus	Santa Marta warbler	Vulnerable	Sierra Nevada de Santa Marta
Basileuterus conspicillatus	White-lored warbler	Near threatened	Sierra Nevada de Santa Marta
Myioborus flavivertex	Yellow-crowned redstart		Sierra Nevada de Santa Marta
Cardinalidae
Habia gutturalis	Sooty ant-tanager	Near threatened	Foothills of northern Andes including Magdalena Valley
Habia cristata	Crested ant-tanager		West slope of West Andes
Thraupidae
Bangsia melanochlamys	Black-and-gold tanager	Vulnerable	Central Andes (Antioquia); West Andes (Chocó, Risaralda, Valle del Cauca)
Bangsia aureocincta	Gold-ringed tanager	Endangered	West Andes (Chocó, Risaralda, Valle del Cauca, Antioquia)
Anisognathus melanogenys	Black-cheeked mountain-tanager		Sierra Nevada de Santa Marta
Chlorochrysa nitidissima	Multicolored tanager	Vulnerable	West Andes; Central Andes (Risaralda, Antioquia)
Dacnis hartlaubi	Turquoise dacnis	Vulnerable	Spottily in Andes (Valle del Cauca, Huila, Quindío, Antioquia, Risaralda, Cundinamarca, Boyacá)
Diglossa gloriosissima	Chestnut-bellied flowerpiercer	Endangered	Spottily in West Andes (Antioquia to Cauca)

== Image gallery ==
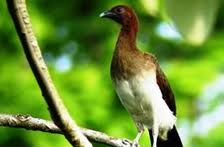
Ortalis garrula

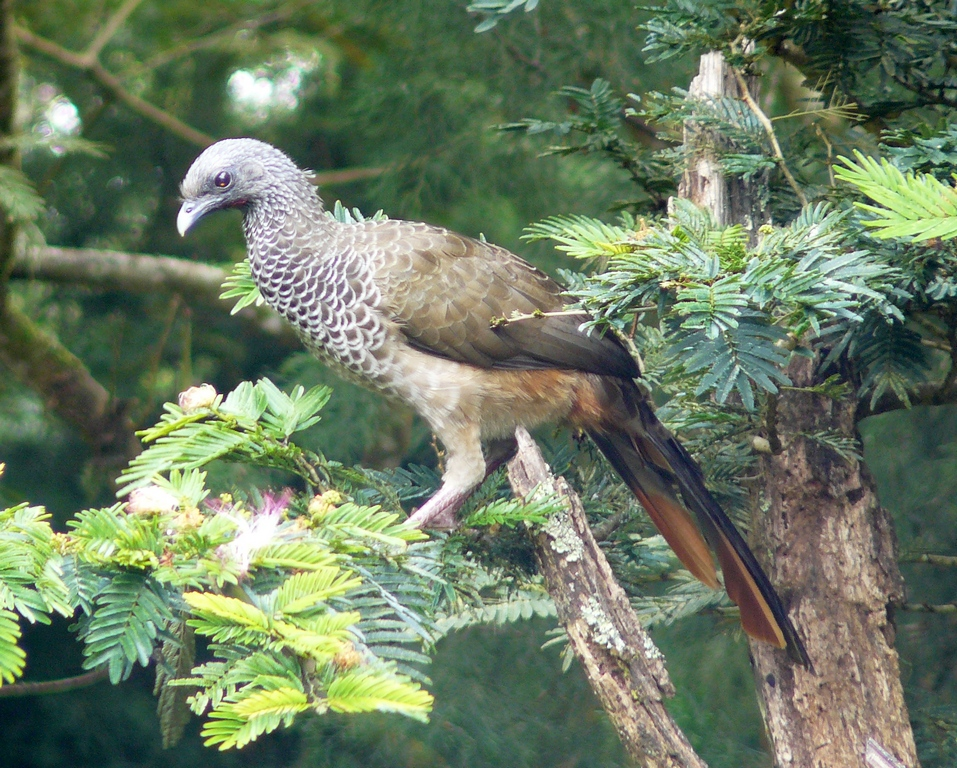
Ortalis columbiana

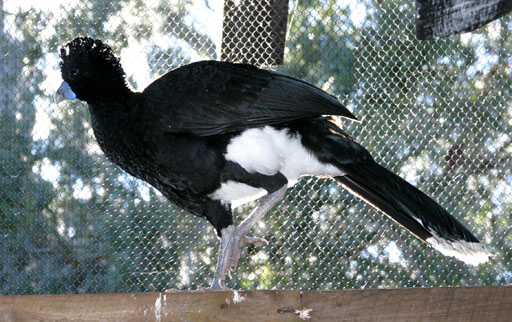
Crax alberti

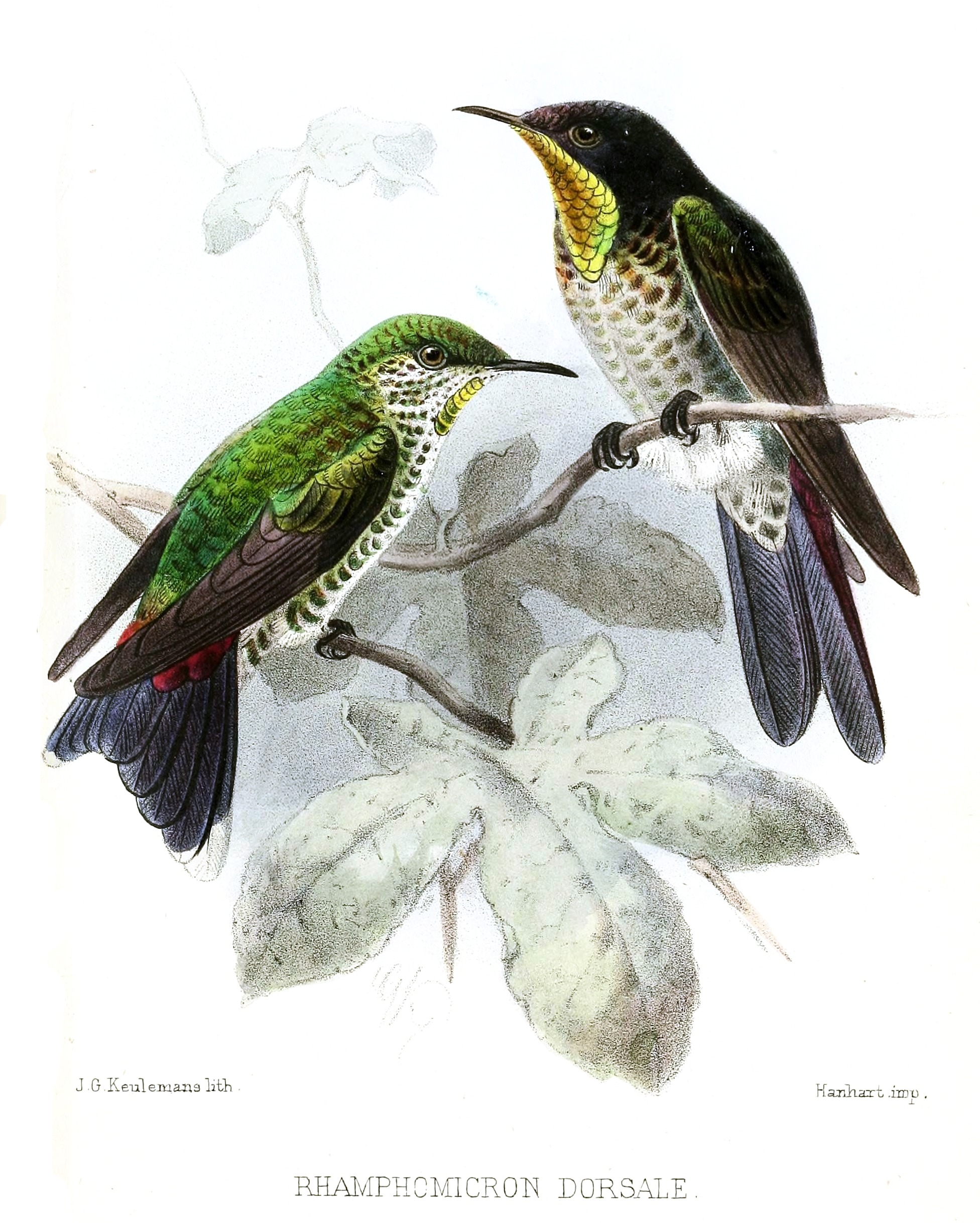
Ramphomicron dorsale

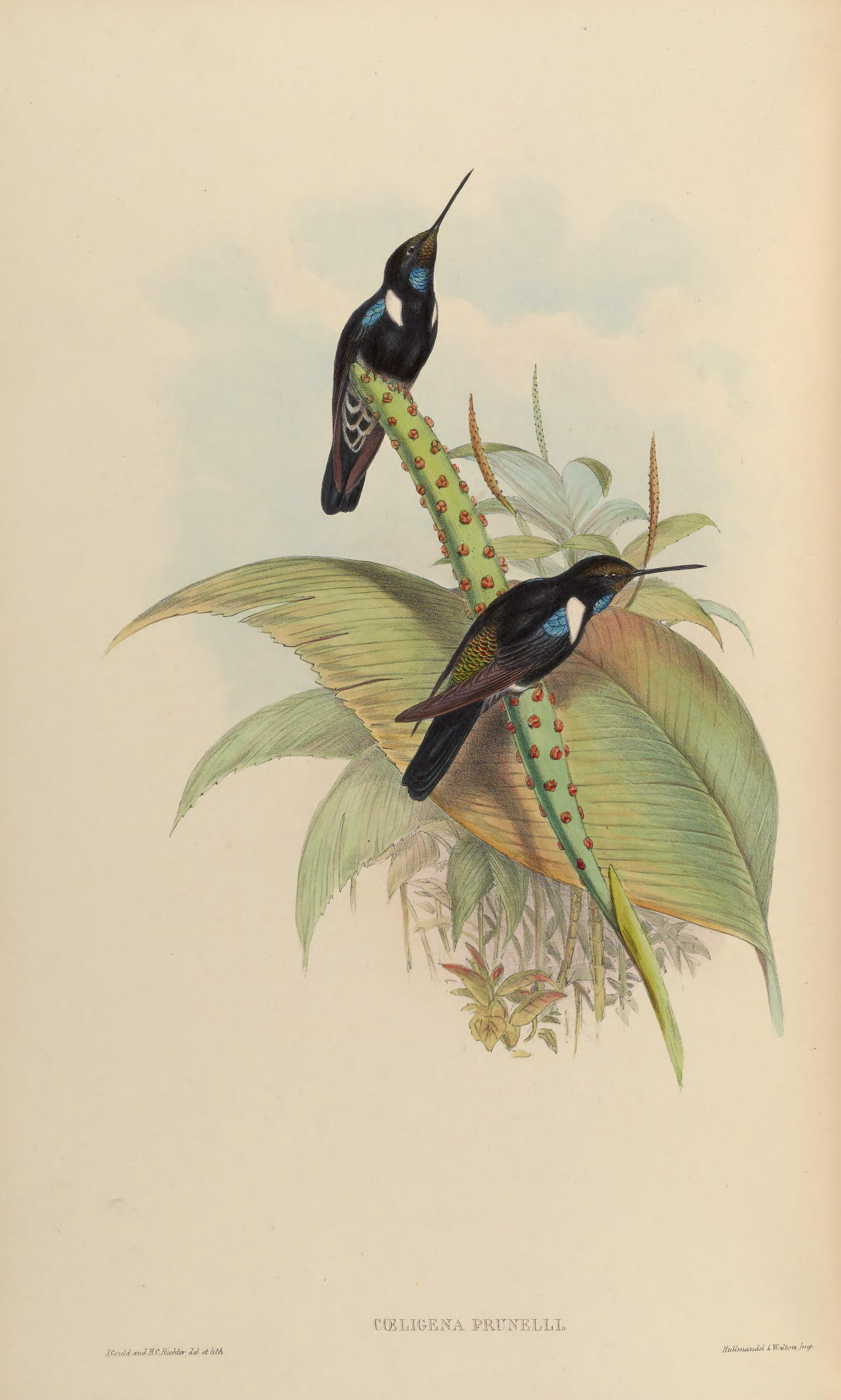
Coeligena prunellei

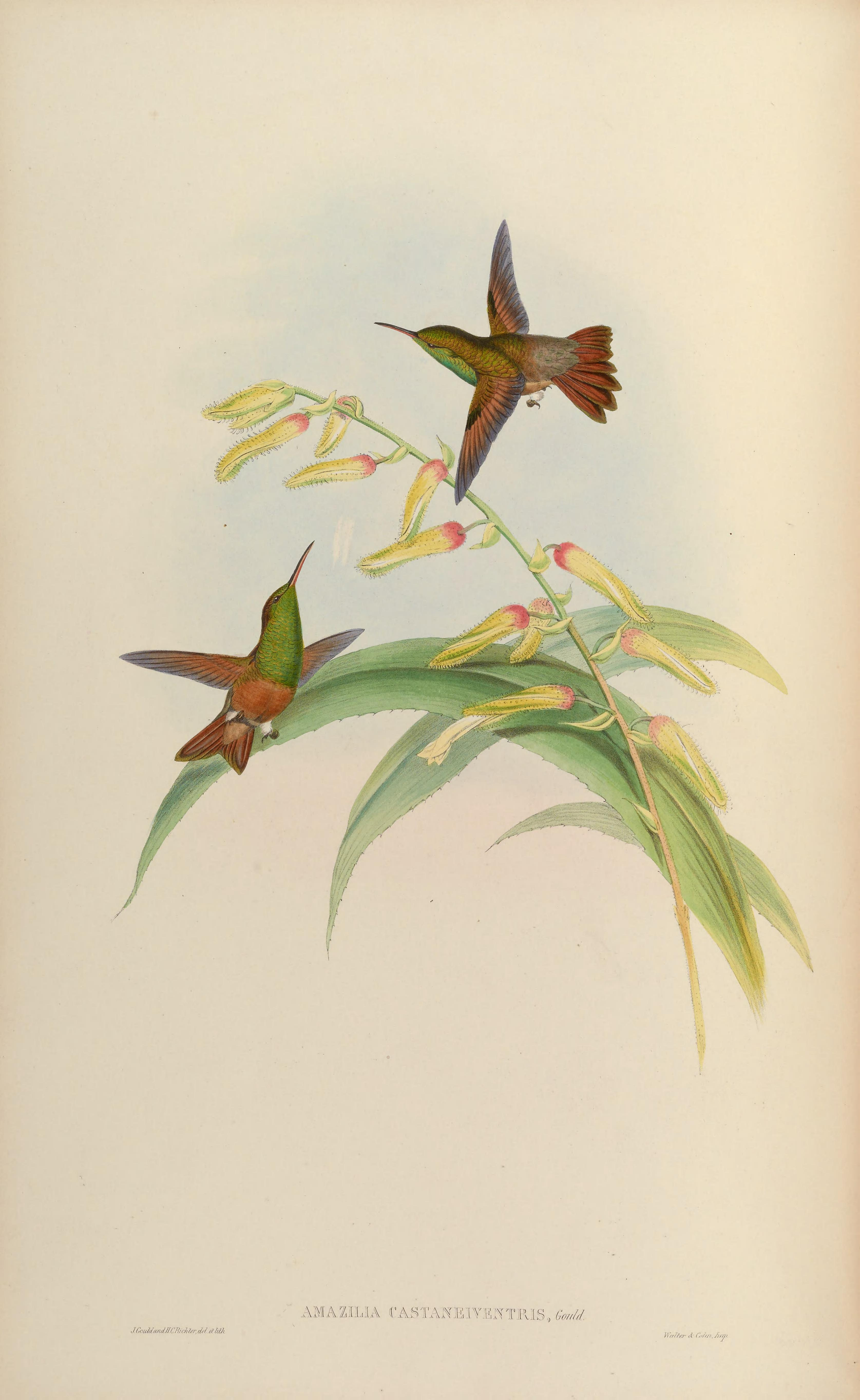
Amazilia castaneiventris

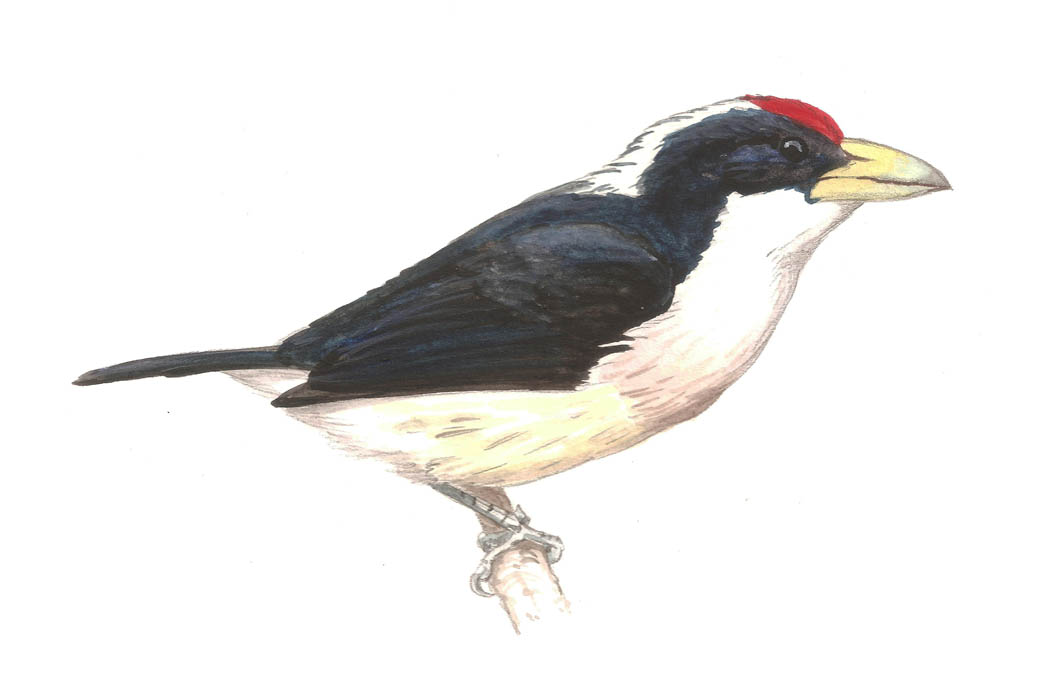
Capito hypoleucus

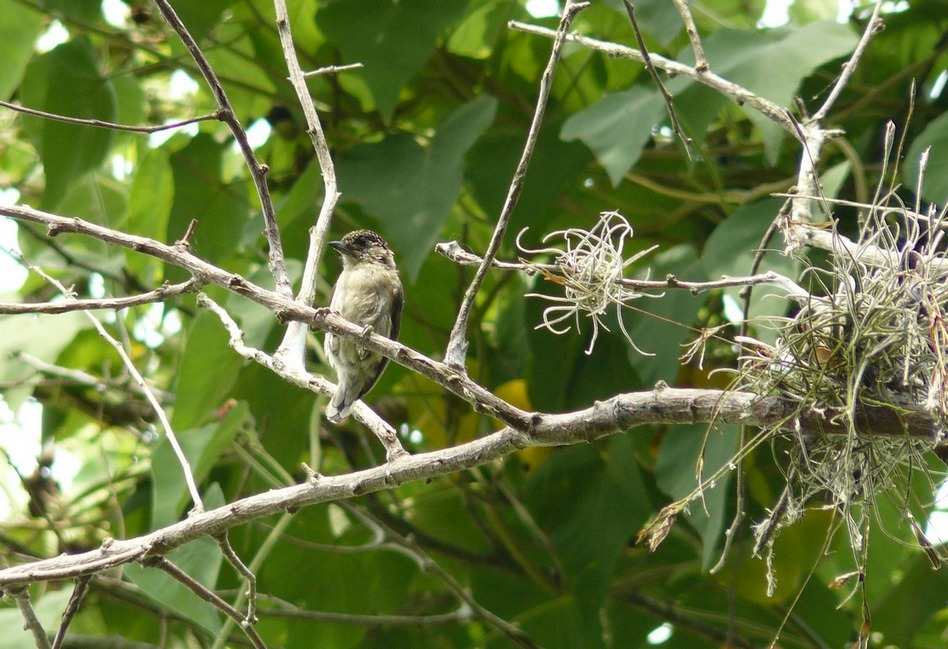
Picumnus granadensis

Melanerpes pulcher

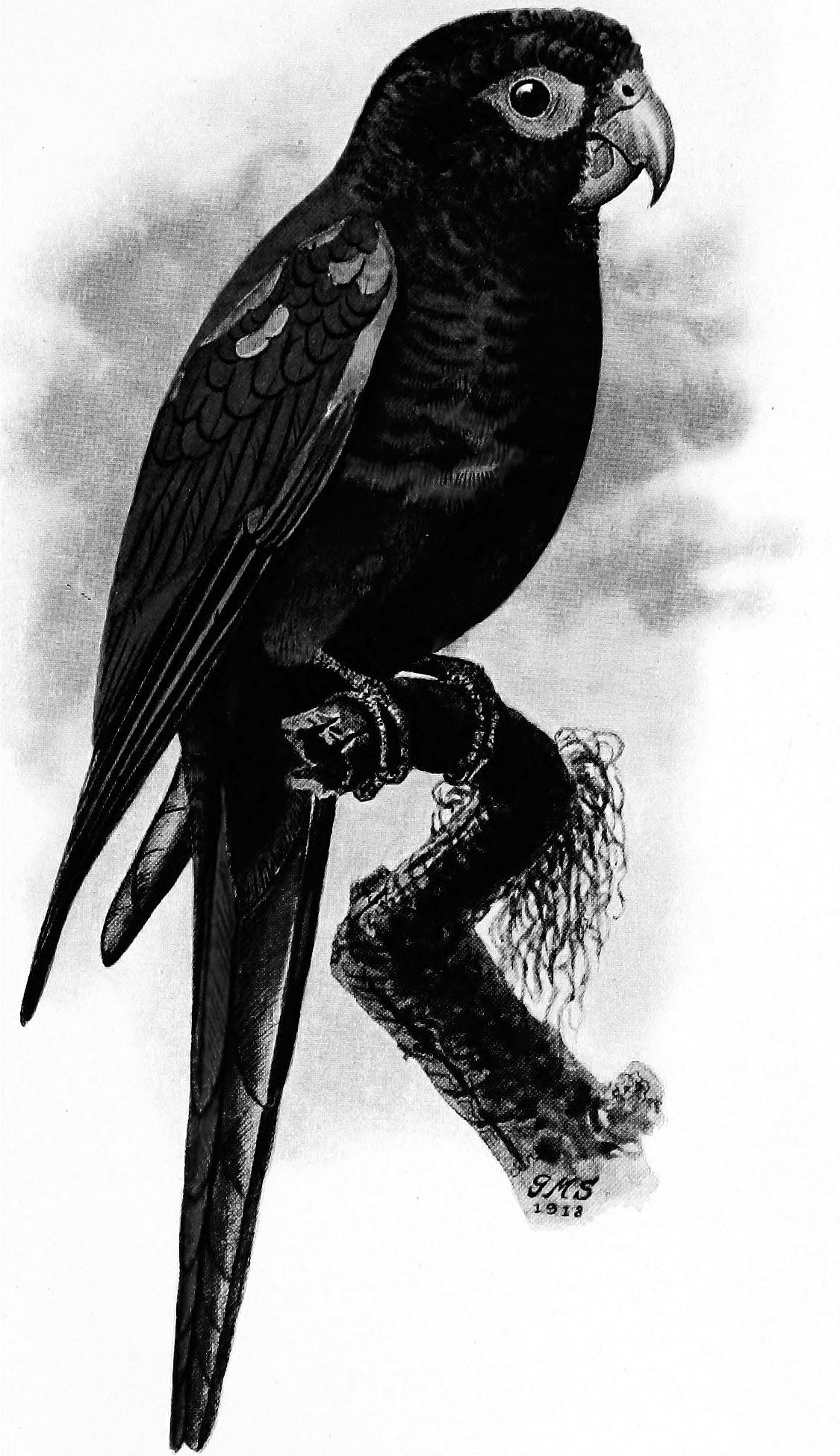
Pyrrhura viridicata

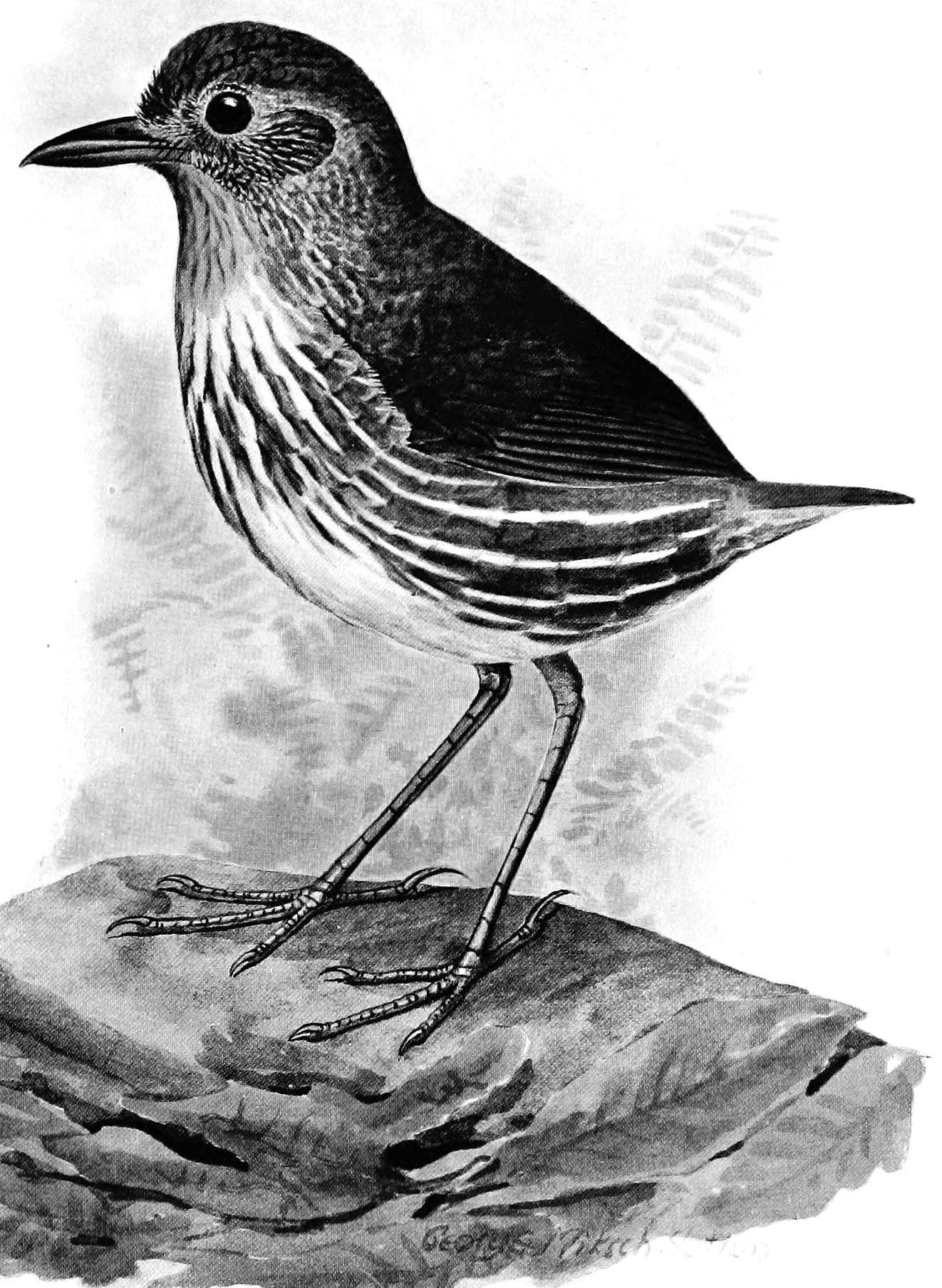
Grallaria bangsi

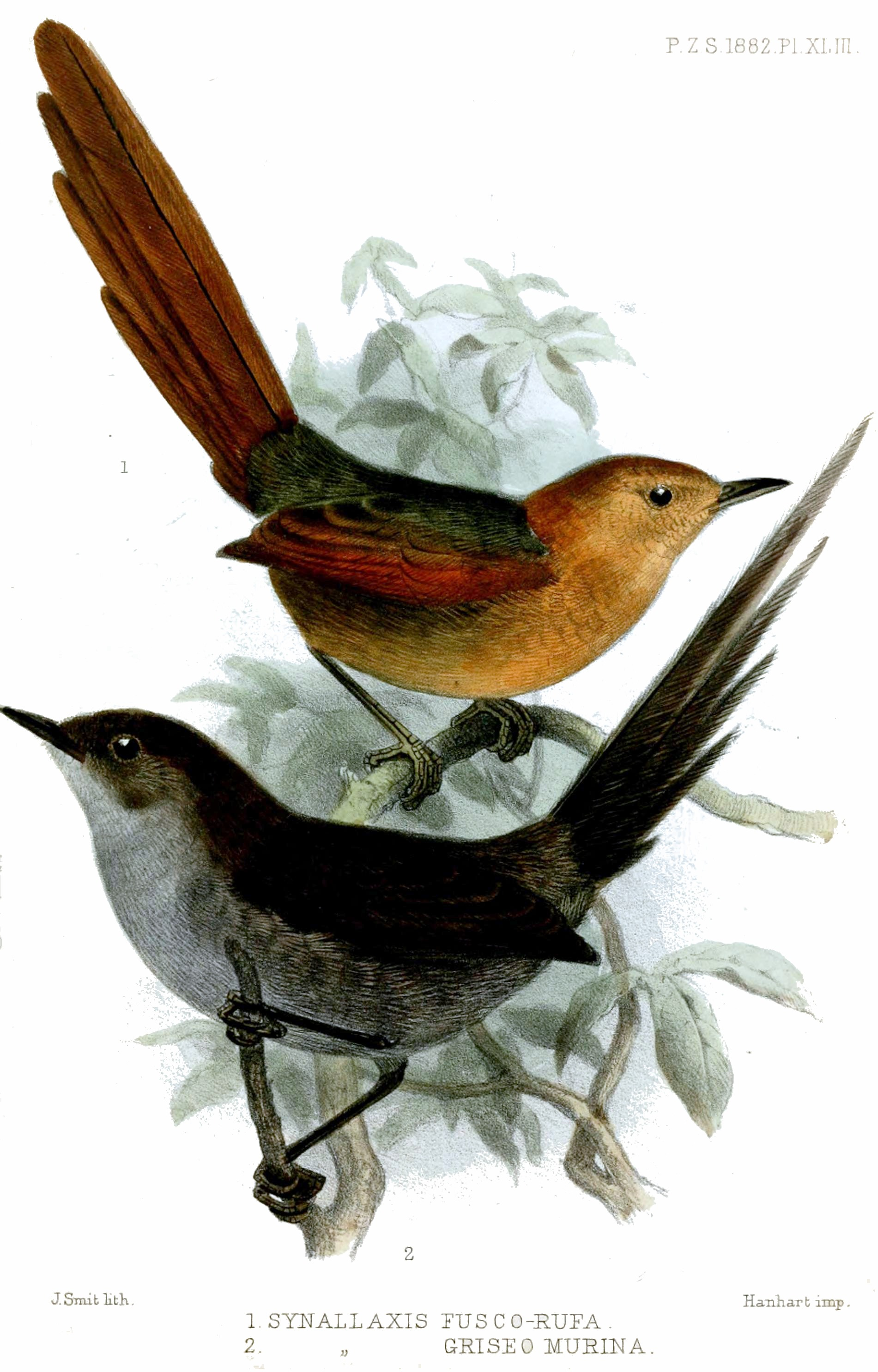
Synallaxis fuscorufa

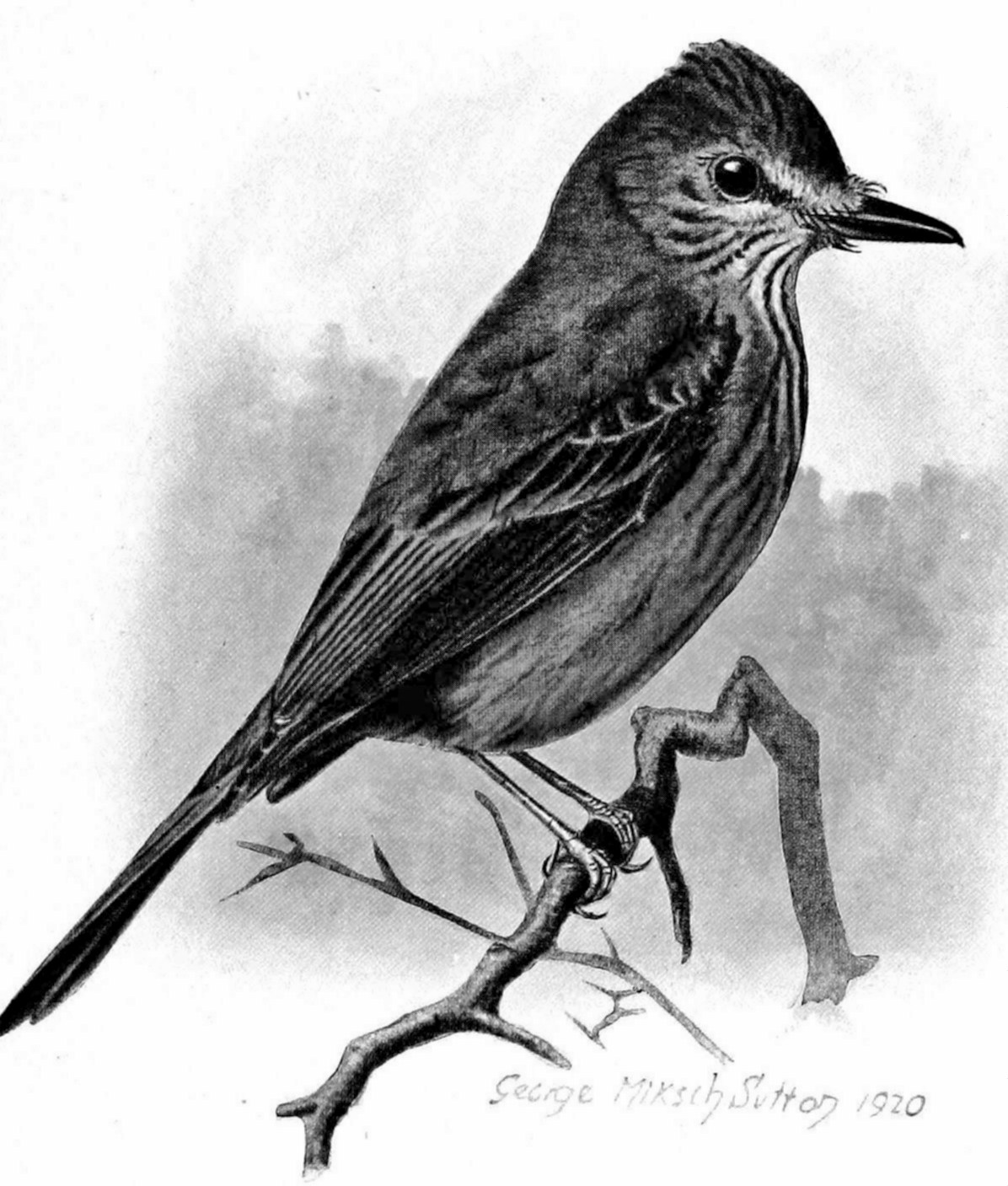
Myiotheretes pernix

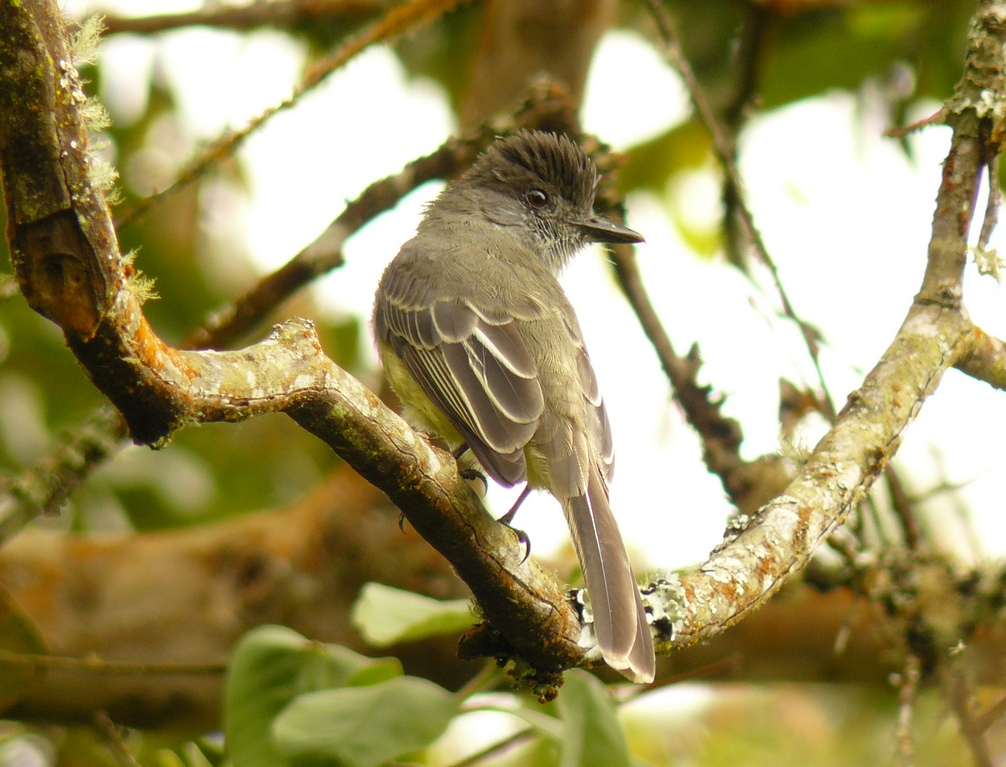
Myiarchus apicalis

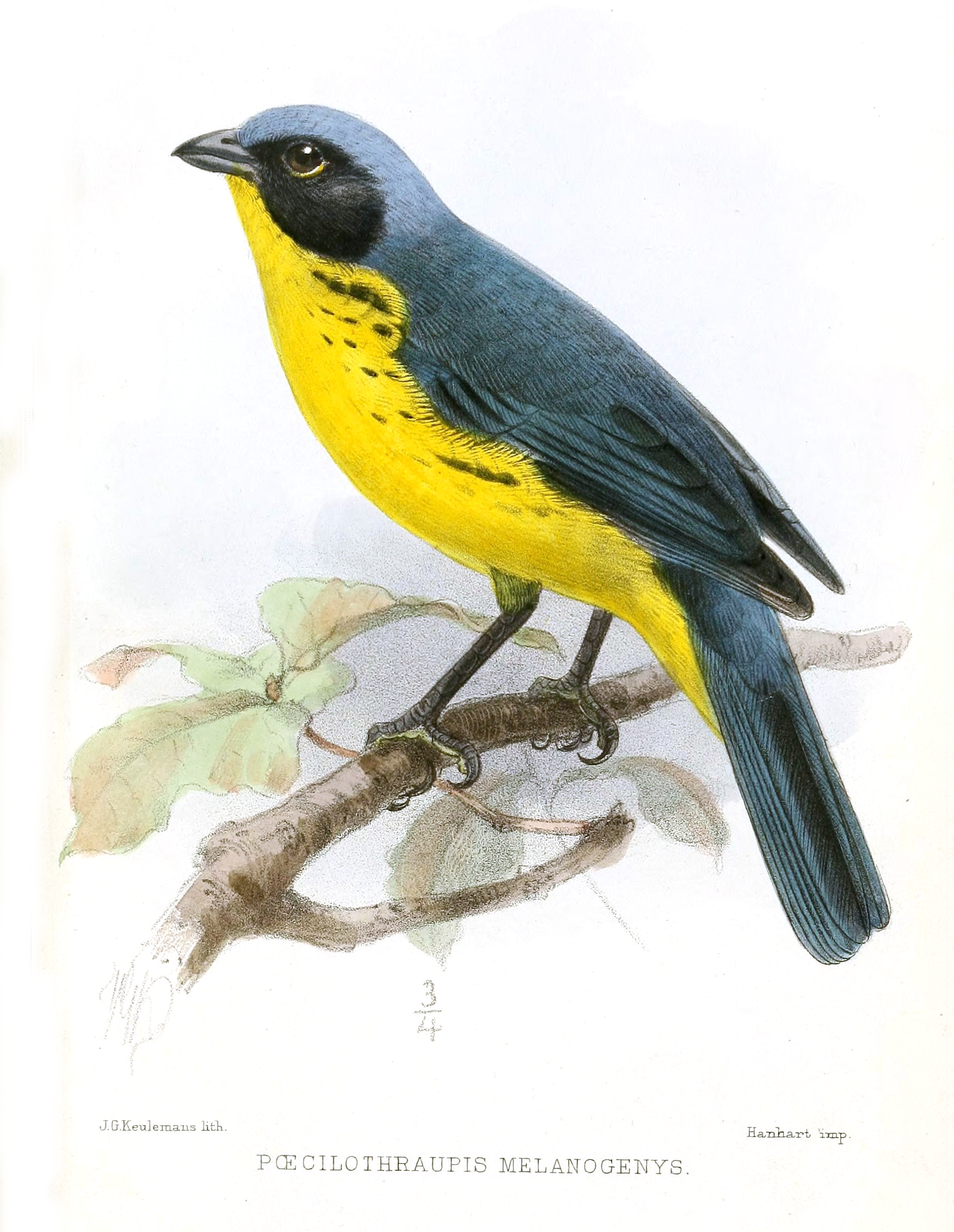
Anisognathus melanogenys

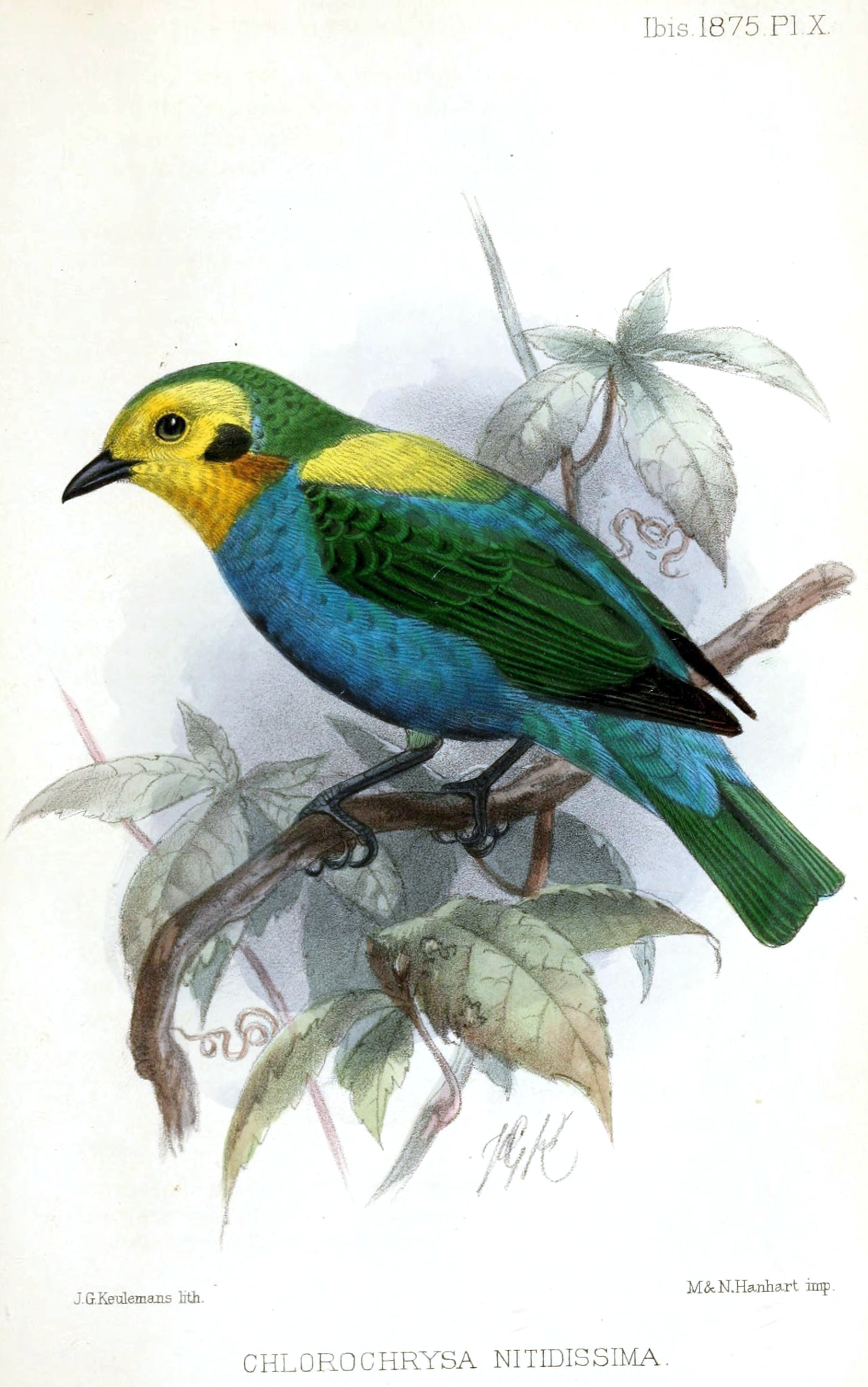
Chlorochrysa nitidissima

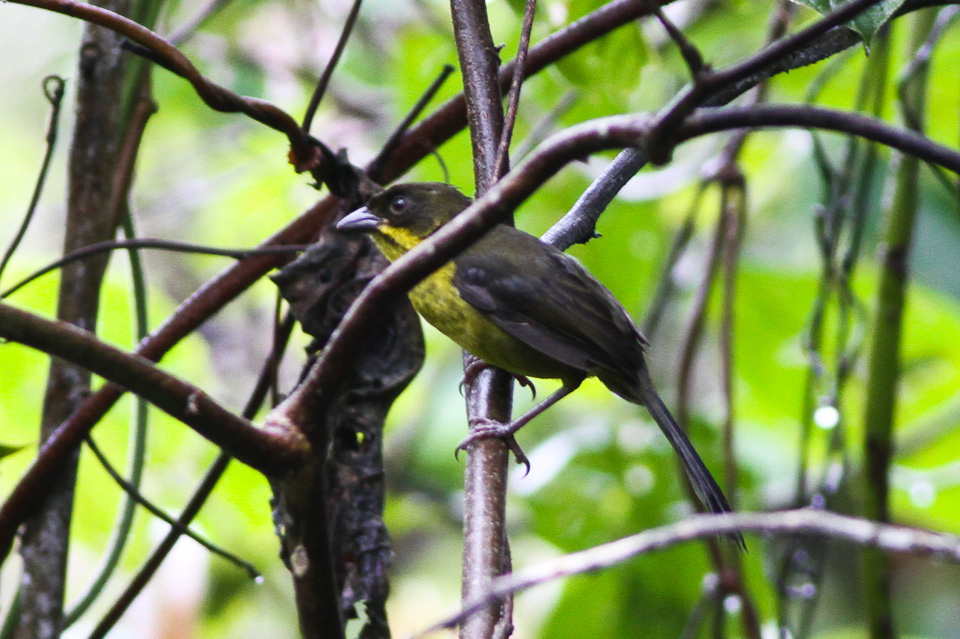
Atlapetes fuscoolivaceus

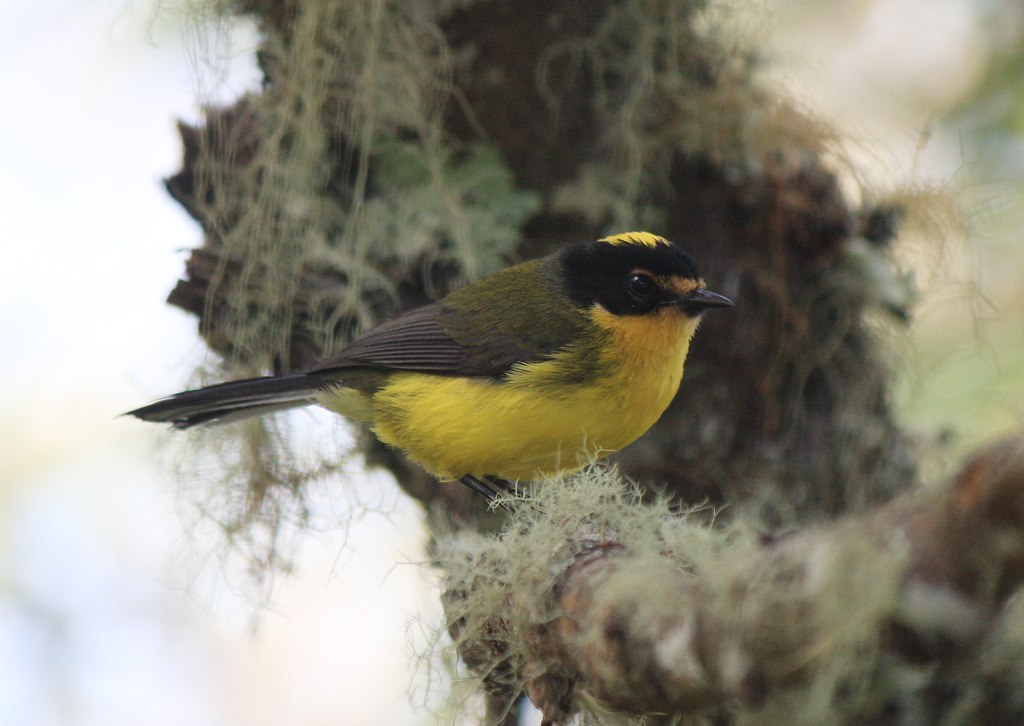
Myioborus flavivertex

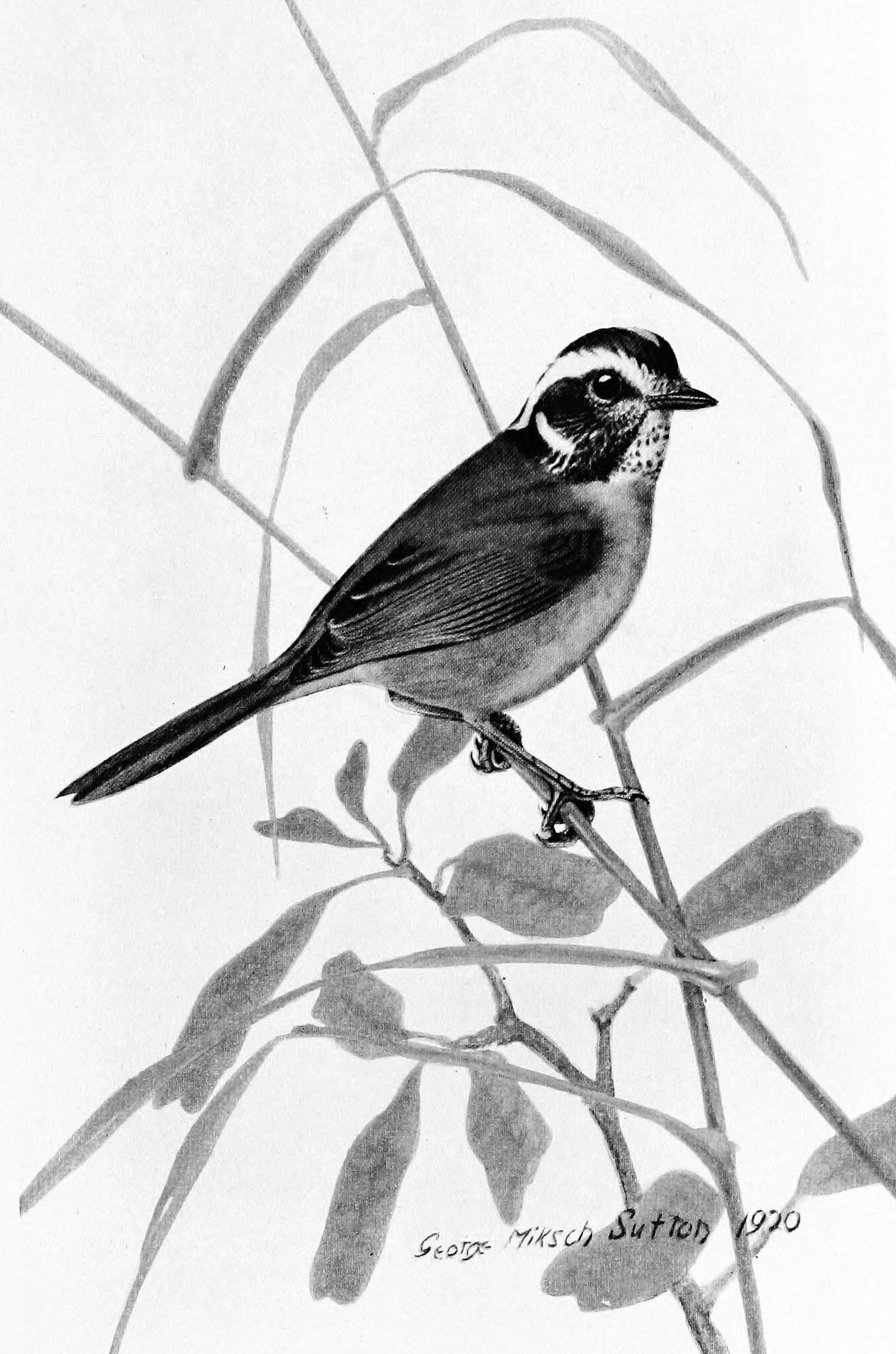
Basileuterus basilicus

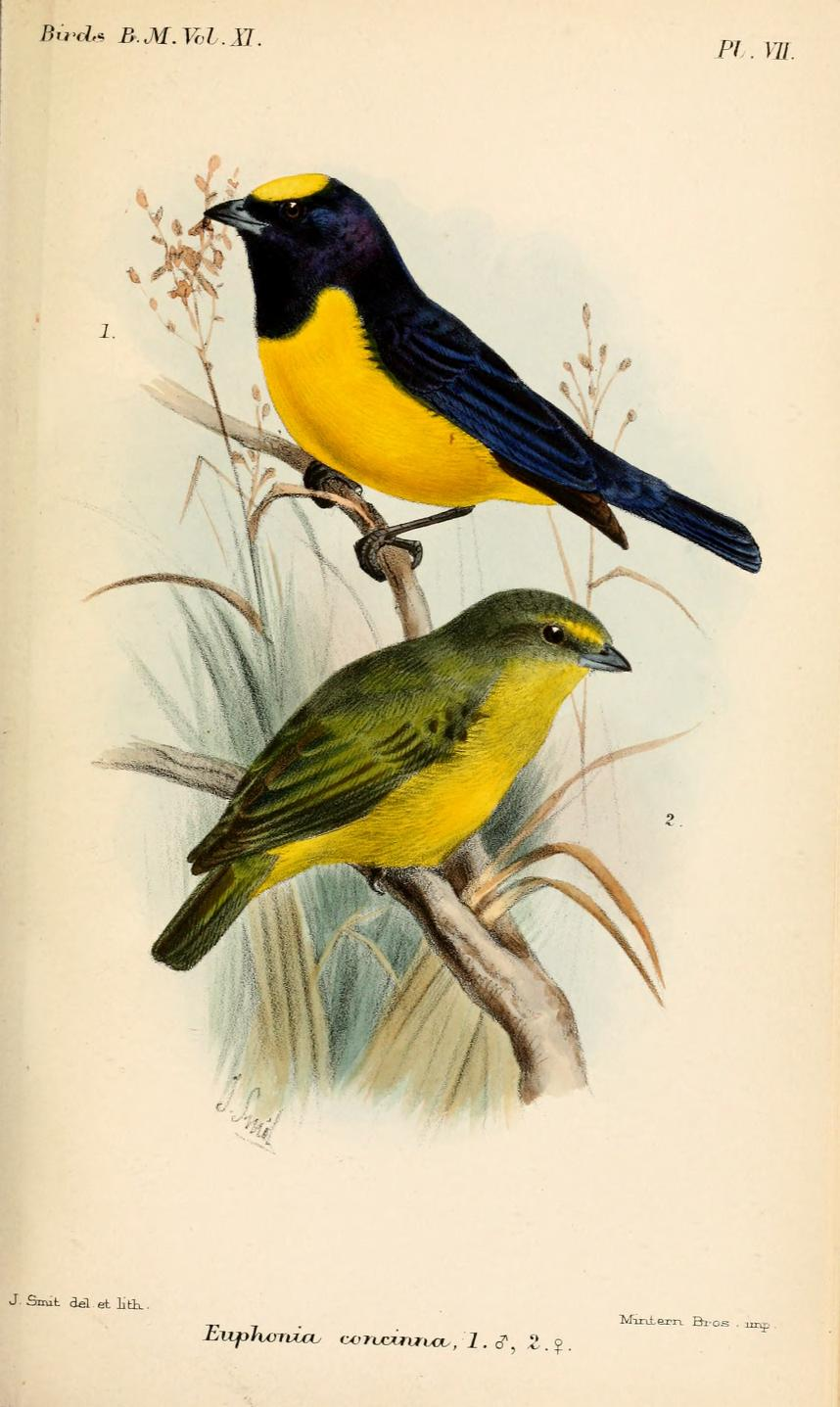
Euphonia concinna

== See also ==
- List of birds of Colombia
