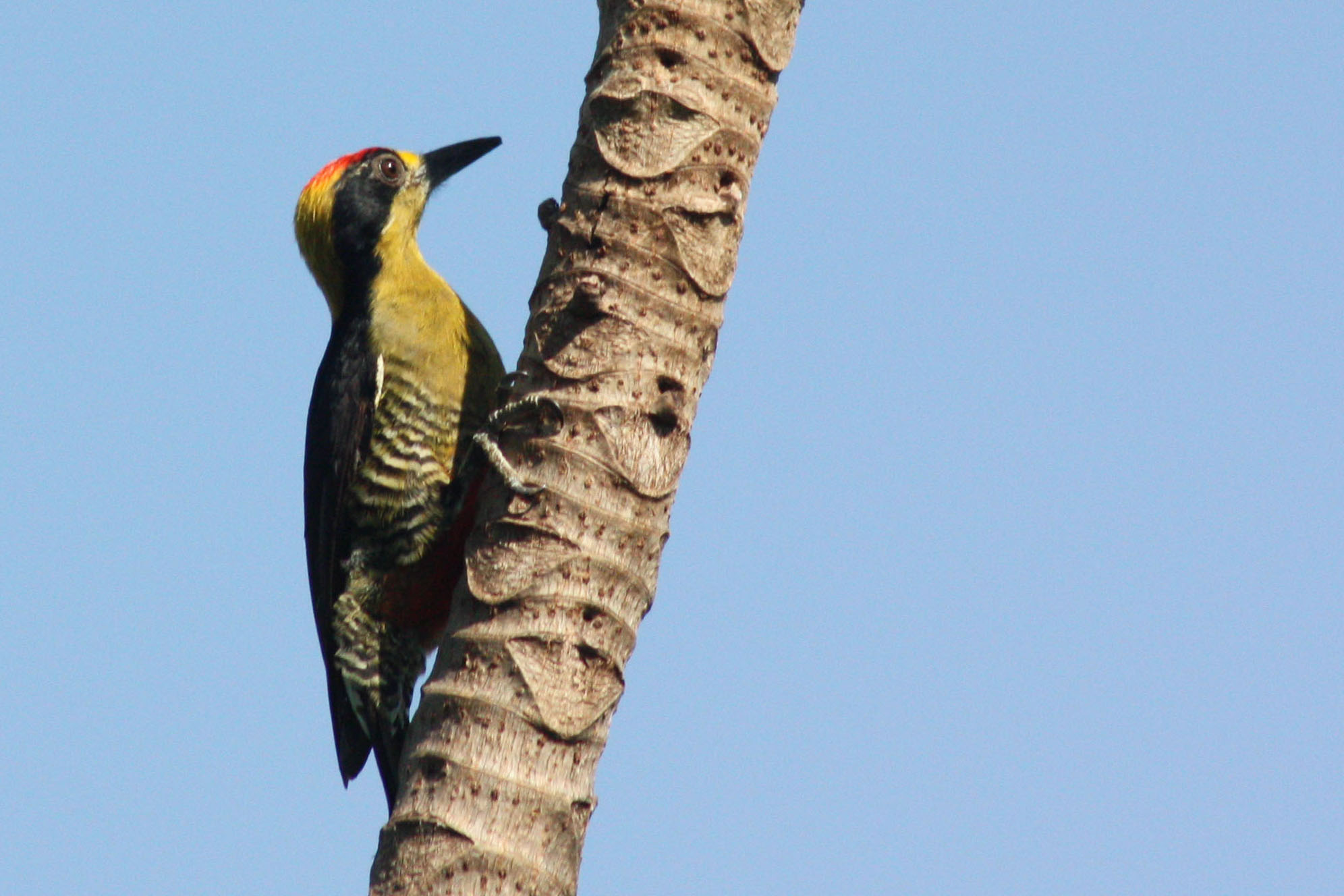
- Male, Osa Peninsula, Costa Rica

Conservation status
- Least Concern (IUCN 3.1)

Scientific classification
- Kingdom: Animalia
- Phylum: Chordata
- Class: Aves
- Order: Piciformes
- Family: Picidae
- Genus: Melanerpes
- Species: M. chrysauchen

Binomial name
- Melanerpes chrysauchen Salvin, 1870

= Golden-naped woodpecker =

Species of bird

The golden-naped woodpecker (Melanerpes chrysauchen) is a species of bird in the woodpecker family Picidae. The species is very closely related to the beautiful woodpecker, which is sometimes treated as the same species. The two species, along with several other species, are sometimes placed in the genus Tripsurus.

It is found in Costa Rica and western Panama, where it is found on the Pacific slopes of those countries. Its natural habitats are subtropical or tropical moist lowland forests and heavily degraded former forest. The International Union for Conservation of Nature has rated its conservation status as "least concern".

== Description ==
The golden-naped woodpecker grows to a length of about 18 cm (7 in). It is similar in appearance to the beautiful woodpecker but their ranges do not overlap. The sexes are similar apart from the male having a yellow fore-crown and a red central-crown, while the whole crown of the female is yellow except for a narrow central transverse black band. Both sexes have a yellow nape, and a black mask surrounding the eyes and running to the nape. There is a small white patch behind the eye. The lores, cheeks, chin, throat and breast are pale yellow, buff or grey. The lower breast, belly and flanks are barred in black and white, and there is a red patch on mid-belly. The mantle is mainly black and the wings brownish, with the tips of the flight feathers white. The back and rump are mainly white, sometimes blotched with black, and the tail is black with white barring on the outer feathers. The iris is brown, the beak is greyish-black and the legs are greyish-olive.

== Distribution and habitat ==
Endemic to Central America, the golden-naped woodpecker is restricted to the Pacific slopes of southwestern Costa Rica and western Panama, at altitudes ranging from sea level to about 1,500 m (5,000 ft). It is a forest species found in primary humid rainforest, especially open areas with tall trees, woodland edges, secondary forests and plantations and degraded areas in close proximity to natural forest. It is a non-migratory species.

== Ecology ==
The diet of the golden-naped woodpecker consists largely of fruit, including dates, bananas, figs and Cecropia fruits. The bird also forages on tree trunks for insects such as beetle larvae, and particularly at dusk, sallies high in the air to catch winged termites and other flying insects. The nest is made in a hole in a tree. The breeding season is between March and June, and occasionally there may be two broods in the season.

== Status ==
No particular threats have been identified for this woodpecker, and in the absence of evidence to the contrary, the population is thought to be steady. Although it has a restricted range, it is a common bird within that range, being estimated to have a total area of occupation of 23,800 km^{2} (9,200 sq mi). The International Union for Conservation of Nature has assessed its conservation status as being of "least concern".
