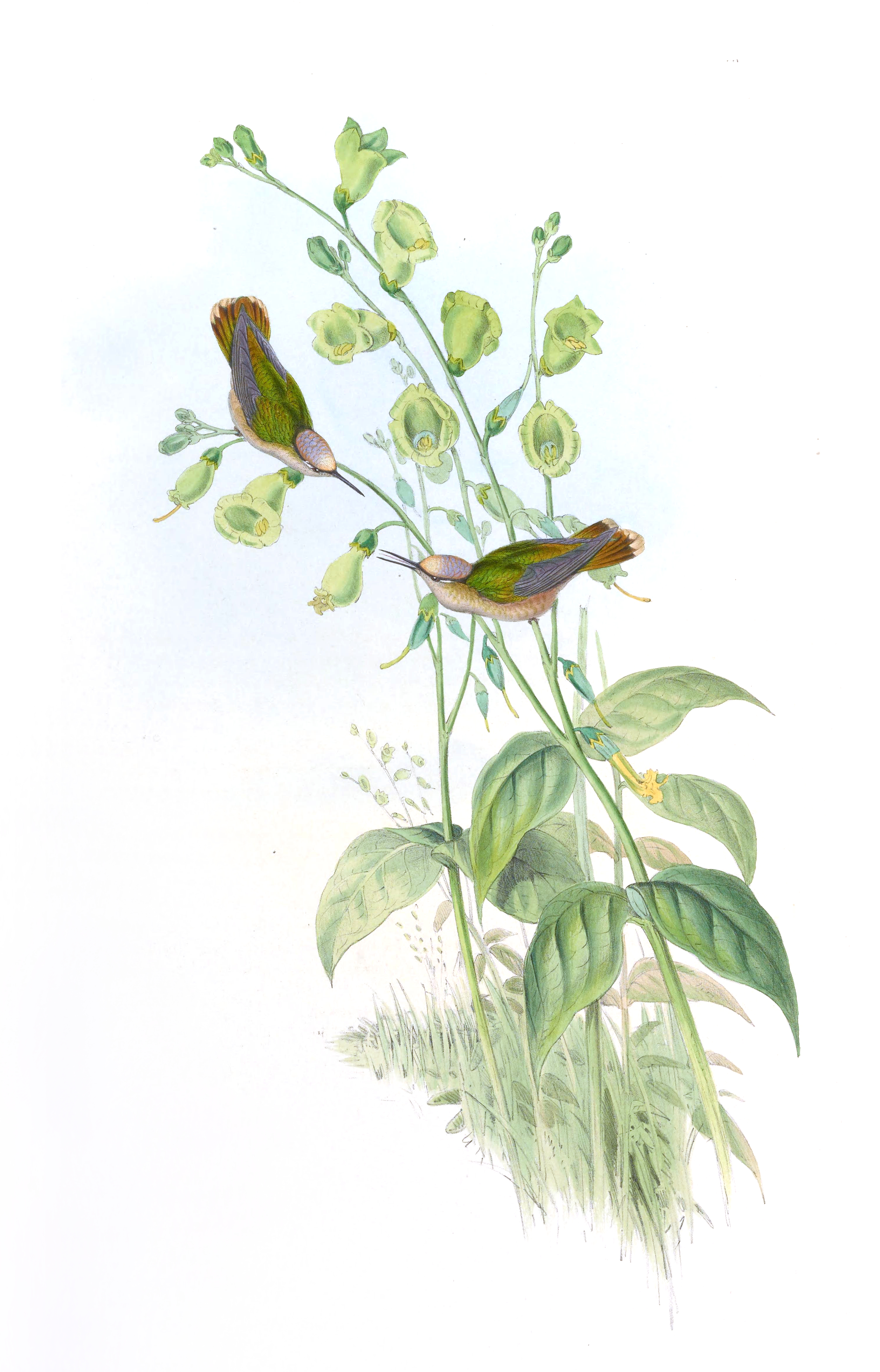
- Santa Marta blossomcrown (Anthocephala floriceps)

Scientific classification
- Kingdom: Animalia
- Phylum: Chordata
- Class: Aves
- Order: Apodiformes
- Family: Trochilidae
- Tribe: Trochilini
- Genus: Anthocephala; Cabanis & Heine, 1860

Type species
- Trochilus floriceps Gould, 1854

Species
- 2, see text

= Blossomcrown =

Genus of birds

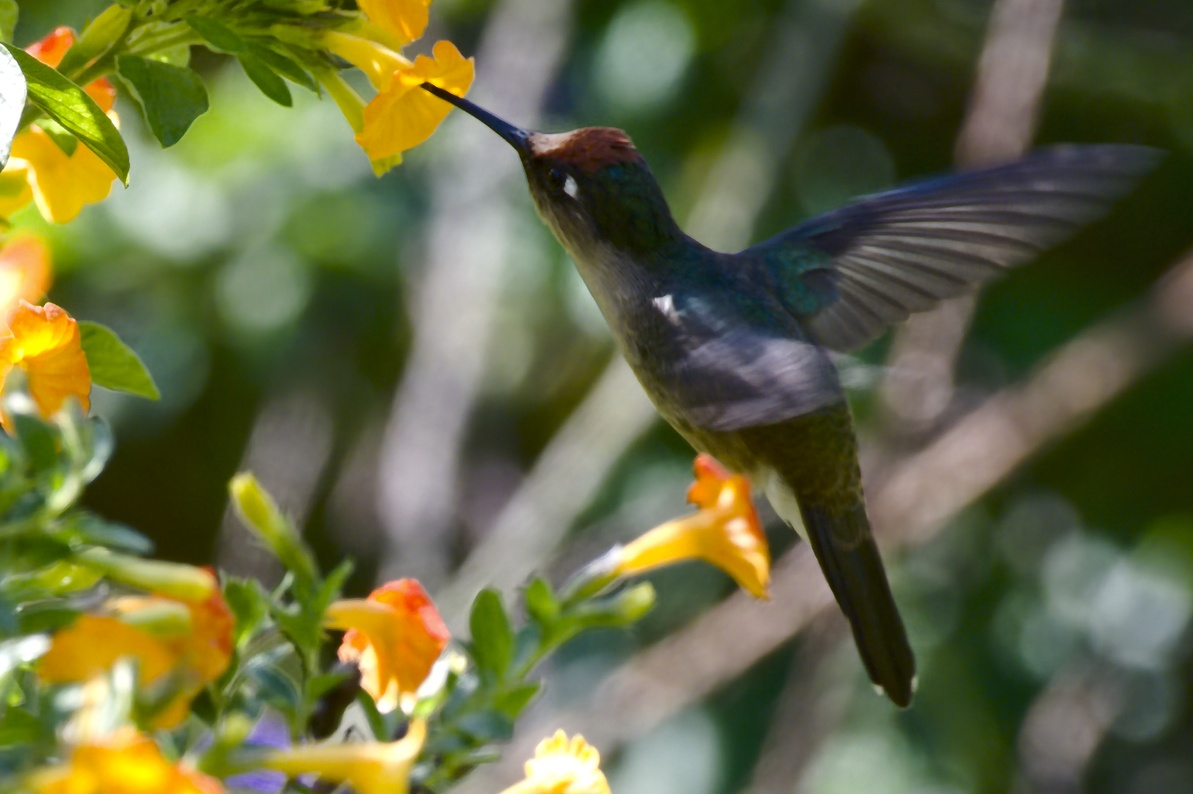
Tolima blossomcrown

The two blossomcrowns comprise the genus Anthocephala. They were formerly considered conspecific. The SACC accepted both as distinct species in 2015.

== Species ==
The two species are:

Genus Anthocephala – Cabanis & Heine, 1860 – two species
Common name	Scientific name and subspecies	Range	Size and ecology	IUCN status and estimated population
Santa Marta blossomcrown	Anthocephala floriceps (Gould, 1853)	Sierra Nevada de Santa Marta of Colombia	Size: Habitat: Diet:	VU
Tolima blossomcrown	Anthocephala berlepschi Salvin, 1893	Colombia (Cauca, northern Huila, Tolima, and Quindío )	Size: Habitat: Diet:	VU
