= Peter Kaestner =

American diplomat (born 1953)

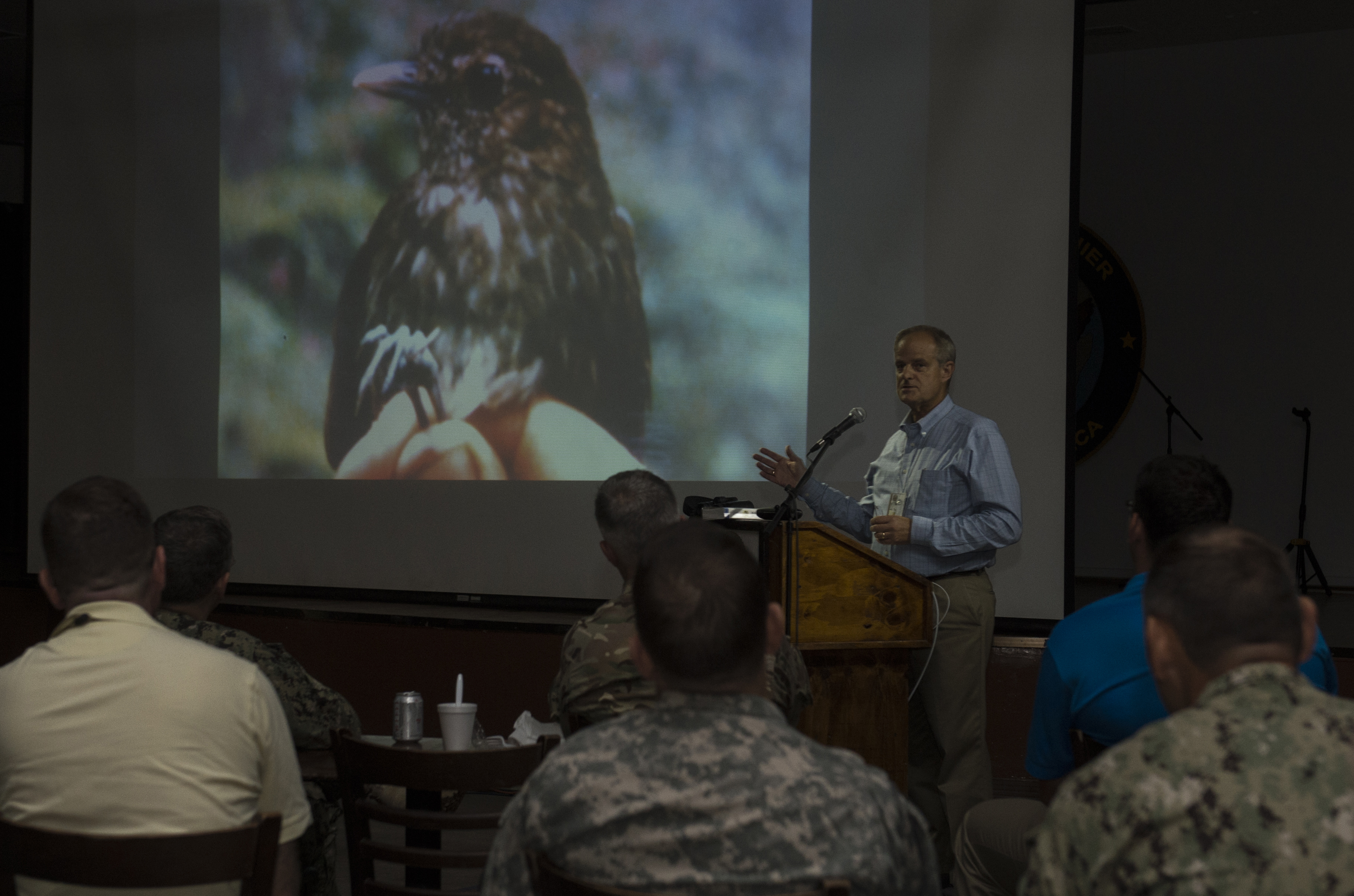
- Kaestner in 2015 presenting about Grallaria kaestneri, a species named after him
- Born: Peter Graham Kaestner; 21 July 1953 (age 73); Baltimore, Maryland, United States
- Spouse: Kimberly Vreeland Kaestner
- Children: 2

Peter Graham Kaestner (born 21 July 1953) is an American retired diplomat and amateur ornithologist. An avid birder, he has taken advantage of his position as an international diplomat to follow his hobby, and, in 2024, became the first person to see more than 10,000 bird species in the wild. In 1989, while working as a U.S. consular officer in Bogotá, Colombia, he discovered a species new to science, the Cundinamarca antpitta (Grallaria kaestneri), which was subsequently named after him.

Kaestner most recently served as the chief of the Consular Section at the U.S. Consulate General in Frankfurt, Germany.

== Personal life ==
Born in Baltimore, Maryland, on 21 July 1953 to Benjamin Henry Kaestner, Jr. and Alice (Reed) Kaestner, he is the middle child of 10 siblings and step-siblings. He attended the Friends School of Baltimore. After spending two years in the Peace Corps in Zaire, Kaestner entered the Foreign Service in 1980, and has been assigned in the past to India, Egypt, Brazil, Guatemala, New Guinea, the Solomon Islands, Colombia, Malaysia, and Namibia. In 1990 he had his first child with his wife Kimberly Vreeland Kaestner, Katherine Kaestner. In 1991 the couple had a second child, Laurel Kaestner.

== Diplomatic career ==
From May 2013 to 2014 he was the Senior Civilian Representative in Northern Afghanistan, based at Camp Marmal, Mazar-e Sharif. From 2009 to late 2012 he was a senior inspector in the Office of Inspector General of the U.S. State Department. From 2006 to 2009 he was the Minister Counselor for Consular Affairs of the American Embassy in New Delhi, India. As Minister Counselor, he oversaw consular operations in New Delhi and the U.S. Consulates Generals in Mumbai (Bombay), Chennai (Madras), Hyderabad, and Kolkata (Calcutta). He retired from the Foreign Service in August 2016.

== Birding ==
An avid birder, he has taken advantage of his position as an international diplomat to follow his hobby. By October 1986, he had become the first birder to see a representative of each bird family in the world as recognized in Guinness World Records. In 1989, while on a birding expedition near Bogotá, Colombia, where he was a U.S. consular officer, he discovered a species new to science, the Cundinamarca antpitta (Grallaria kaestneri), which was subsequently named after him.

In April 2023, weeks before turning 70, Kaestner beat the world record of bird species seen in the wild. In February 2024, with his sighting of an orange-tufted spiderhunter (Arachnothera flammifera) on the island of Mindanao in the Philippines, he became the first person to see 10,000 bird species anywhere in the world.
