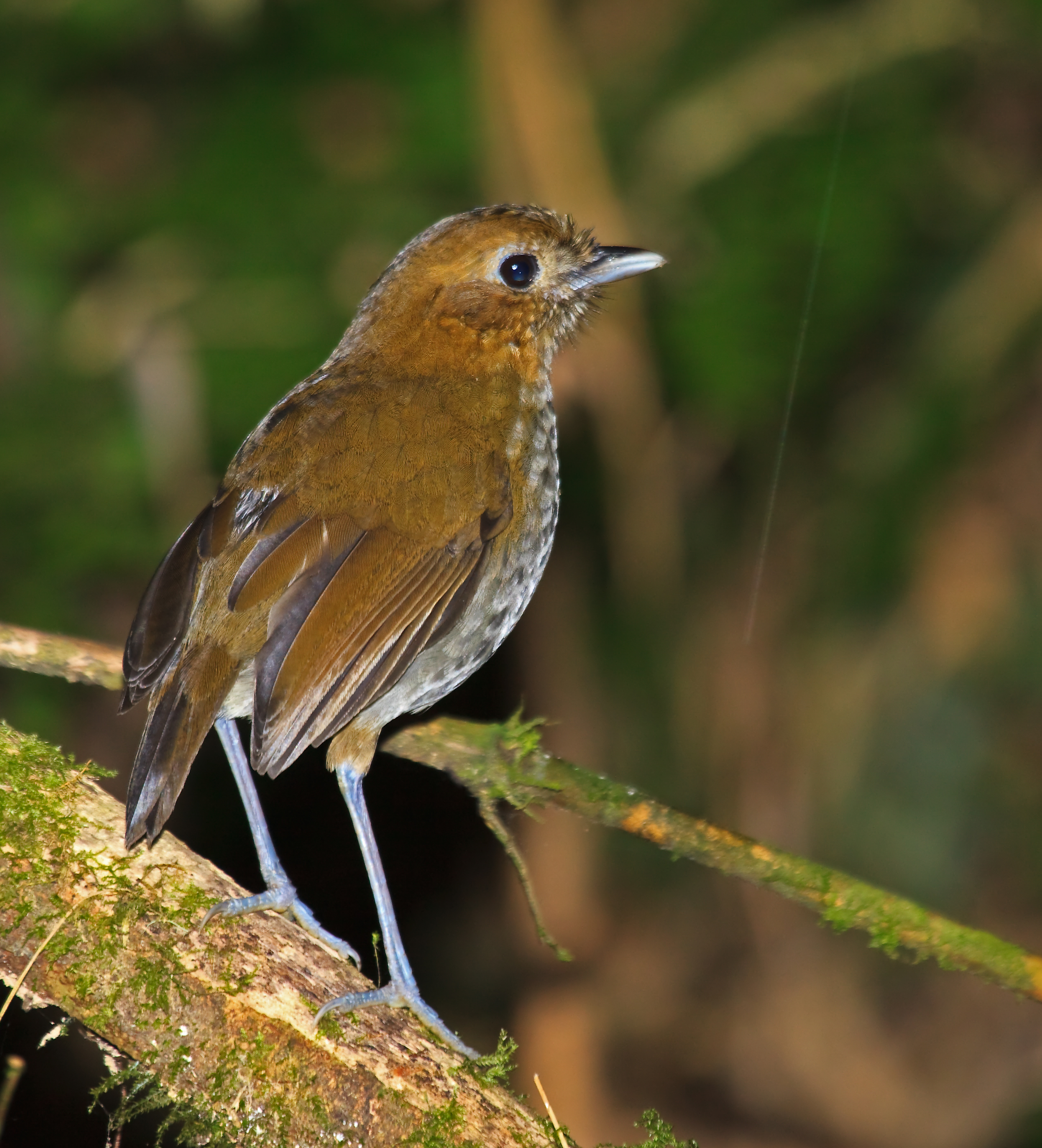

Conservation status
- Critically Endangered (IUCN 3.1)

Scientific classification
- Domain: Eukaryota
- Kingdom: Animalia
- Phylum: Chordata
- Class: Aves
- Order: Passeriformes
- Family: Grallariidae
- Genus: Grallaria
- Species: G. urraoensis

Binomial name
- Grallaria urraoensis Carantón-Ayala & Certuche-Cubillos, 2010

Synonyms
- Grallaria fenwickorum Barrera and Bartels, 2010

= Urrao antpitta =

Species of bird

The Urrao antpitta (Grallaria urraoensis), also known as Fenwick's antpitta (Grallaria fenwickorum), is a highly threatened species of bird found in the understory of cloud forest in the Andean highlands of Colombia. The first published description used the scientific name Grallaria fenwickorum (and English name Fenwick's antpitta); shortly afterward, a second description using the name Grallaria urraoensis was published. The editors of the latter recognized that the name likely was a junior synonym, but others have questioned the validity of the first description, and various authorities, including the International Ornithological Congress, have adopted G. urraoensis. Antioquia antpitta has been suggested as an English-language name compromise.

== Discovery ==
The new species was discovered during banding sessions in September 2007 and February and March 2008 when Diego Carantón, then working as a researcher for a Colombian NGO, Fundación ProAves de Colombia, caught an unfamiliar Grallaria antpitta. It was also sound-recorded in late 2008. The population was thought to be a new species and was added to the Colombian checklist as "Grallaria sp." in 2009. Since 2008 many ornithologists and birders have seen, photographed, recorded and studied the new bird at the reserve, where a family party is seen daily at a feeding station alongside chestnut-naped antpittas. Luis Felipe Barrera and Avery Bartels, the authors of the description under the name Grallaria fenwickorum, based it on holotypic material from a living bird, but also included information based on two specimens that Carantón had collected earlier.

Their holotype comprises 14 feathers, taken from the wing, tail and body of a living bird which was banded, photographed, sound-recorded and measured in the field before being released, on 11 January 2010. In the description it was stated that the holotype material had been deposited, as tissue collection No. 699, at the José Celestino Mutis Natural History Museum of the Faculty of Sciences of the University of Pamplona. This was denied by people associated with the museum, which has neither a tissue collection nor anything deposited under No. 699. An associate of the museum did receive an envelope with the feathers, but he was not informed about its great significance and it was not moved to the collection until after the description of the new species. The museum does not have an ornithological curator or the means to preserve such an important sample. Consequently, they have forwarded the material to the relevant authorities to allow them to take charge in its depositing and preservation.

Besides this holotype, two specimens were previously collected by Carantón. He has stated that the second was not deliberately collected, but died in the mist net where it was caught, which is not an exceptional occurrence. According to Fundación ProAves these specimens were collected without their knowledge and without the necessary permit from the local government, and consequently neither was used as a holotype in their description, but one could possibly be designated as a neotype if the legal status was resolved. In 2011, the collector and ProAves (the collector was employed by them when the specimens were collected) were fined for breach of reporting requirements. ProAves maintain that the collection itself was irregular, but there was no such finding by the local government. One of the specimens was used as a holotype in the second description of the species, by Diego Carantón-Ayala and Katherine Certuche-Cubillos, where they coined the name Grallaria urraoensis.

== Taxonomy and etymology ==
Within its genus, the bird is a typical member of the plain-coloured group due to its relatively small wings, fairly uniform upperparts and underparts without strong markings, relatively high tail / wing ratio, a convolute inner edge of the tarsus, and 12 rectrices. It is evidently most closely related to the brown-banded antpitta, G. milleri, because of similarities in voice and measurements and its generally plain plumage. Barrera and Bartels and other ornithologists have suggested that it is most closely related to the probably extinct subspecies G. m. gilesi, but Carantón and Certuche say that it may resemble G. m. milleri more closely than it does gilesi. They suggest that the present species, the brown-banded antpitta, and the Cundinamarca antpitta form a clade.

The genus name Grallaria is derived from the Latin word grallae, meaning "stilts", referring to the bird's relatively long legs. The specific name fenwickorum recognises George Fenwick, President of the American Bird Conservancy (ABC), and his family, who assisted Fundación ProAves (ABC's partner organization in Colombia) in the purchase of land, now the Colibrí del Sol Bird Reserve. Based on present knowledge, the antpitta is restricted to the reserve and its immediate surroundings. ProAves's suggested English name also honours Fenwick, while the Spanish common name Tororoi de Urrao is given after the municipality of Urrao, where the bird is found. Tororoi is a general Spanish name used for most antpitta species. The creation of a type specimen without killing an individual follows the policy of the ABC.

== Description ==
The bird most closely resembles the brown-banded antpitta, which is endemic to the Cordillera Central of Colombia, but it has a slate-grey breast and lacks the brown flanks and breast band of the other species. Measurements of the living bird from which Barrera and Bartels' holotype material was derived, as well as of the two collected specimens, show weights ranging from 53.5 to 57.4 grams (1.89 to 2.02 oz), flat wing chords of 95–99 millimetres (3.7–3.9 in), tail lengths of 57–63 millimetres (2.2–2.5 in), and tarsus lengths of 44.5–49.9 millimetres (1.75–1.96 in). The sexes are similar in appearance, as with most other antpittas.

A captured fledgling was covered with dark grey down with brown edges above and was buff below. Its feet were dark pink; its bill was black above and orange below, with conspicuous red-orange edges. A captured juvenile looked scaled, with patches of chestnut-edged black down intermixed with grey feathers on much of its body, and a buff belly. Its bill resembled that of the fledgling.

The song comprises three notes of increasing length and frequency. The birds sing more early in the year. The call is a single note, higher-pitched than the song, which rises, falls, and rises again. The birds often give it in response to loud noises and playbacks of its vocalisations. They call more later in the year. Both song and call resemble those of the brown-banded antpitta, but Fenwick's antpitta's notes are shorter and lower-pitched, and those of its song are separated by wider intervals.

== Distribution and habitat ==
The known distribution of the bird is limited to the Urrao municipality in and near the Colibrí del Sol Bird Reserve, a 28.52 square kilometres (11.01 sq mi) reserve on the south-eastern slope of the Páramo del Sol massif, at the northern end of the Cordillera Occidental of Colombia, and some 55 kilometres (34 mi) west of Medellín, Colombia's second largest city. The massif has over 27 square kilometres (10 sq mi) of relatively intact páramo and Polylepis woodland, containing more such habitat than all the other páramos in the region combined. There the bird is restricted to upper montane cloud forest dominated by Colombian oak, at an altitude of 2,600 to 3,300 metres (8,500 to 10,800 ft) above sea level, where most territories contain Chusquea bamboo thickets. It is suspected that its range may be larger than currently known, but so far surveys have failed to confirm this.

== Behaviour ==
The species exhibits behaviour typical of other members of its genus; it is a shy, terrestrial forager for insects (especially beetles) in the leaf-litter within the forest understorey. It ascends to higher perches (up to 1.5 m above the ground) to sing, and is most active and vocal in the hours following dawn and prior to dusk.

It usually occurs in pairs, less often singly, and one group of three has been observed.

=== Reproduction ===
The males captured in February and March had enlarged testes, typical of breeding birds. The fledgling and an adult with old brood patches were observed in June. These data and song activity from February to April (a dry season) suggest that the breeding season begins early in the year, possibly as early as January, and extends for several months.

As in other Grallaria species, the fledgling was less developed than those of most passerines, and both parents fed it earthworms.

== Conservation status ==
The bird has a very restricted known range, limited to the Colibrí del Sol reserve and its immediate vicinity, while previous surveys in similar habitat in the region have failed to record the species. Moreover, habitat used by the bird has been extensively cleared for pasture, and the area is rich in minerals. The known population of 24 territories has an estimated area of 5.8 square kilometres (2.2 sq mi), giving a conservative global population estimate of 57–156 territories. Both articles on the new species propose that the IUCN classify Fenwick's antpitta as critically endangered, and this will be followed in the forthcoming 2011 edition of the BirdLife International list, which is the authority used for birds by the IUCN. Although it is protected in the Colibrí del Sol reserve, it needs further protective measures. The single bird or pair that was known from outside the reserve has not been recorded since mid-2010 and appears to have disappeared.

== Controversy over the discovery ==
The first description was published in Conservación Colombiana, the journal of Fundación ProAves. It was accompanied by an editorial giving the reasons that Diego Carantón, who discovered the bird, was not among the authors of the paper. The editorial accused Carantón of taking specimens illegally as well as violating his contract by omitting mention of his discovery from his monthly reports to Fundación ProAves and by trying to deprive the foundation of its intellectual property in the discovery. Specifically, it said that the Fundación had learned of the discovery through third parties in October 2008. Attempts to agree on a publication authored by Carantón and members of Fundación ProAves failed, and then Carantón and others tried to publish a description of the species in the journal The Condor without notifying the Fundación. The Condor rejected the manuscript pending resolution of the dispute. Staff members of Fundación ProAves went to the Colibrí del Sol reserve and in January 2010 caught a bird whose feathers they collected and used as the basis of their publication without Carantón (May 2010).

In June 2010 (though dated May 2010), a second description of the new species by Carantón and another biologist in Colombia, Katherine Certuche, appeared in Ornitología Colombiana, the journal of the Asociación Colombiana de la Ornitología, edited by the ornithologists Carlos Daniel Cadena and F. Gary Stiles. It was accompanied by an editorial describing Stiles's and Cadena's involvement with Carantón and Certuche's paper starting shortly after Fundación ProAves found out about the work. In this account, Cadena attempted to mediate but withdrew because of conflicts with Fundación ProAves. The editorial adds a reason that Carantón's collection of specimens may have been lawful, and notes that in any case, none of the legal accusations against him had been decided by a court. Further, the attempt at joint publication by Carantón, Certuche, and Fundación ProAves scientists failed because Fundación ProAves insisted that Carantón could not be the corresponding author and that Fundación ProAves had to have full control over the final text.

After The Condor rejected Carantón and Certuche's manuscript, they submitted it to Ornitología Colombiana, which decided to publish it despite the previous description of the species. Cadena and Stiles noted that ProAves had not given Carantón the possibility to answer their accusations before they were published and said the description by Barrera and Bartels could be a violation of Carantón's moral rights, which are protected under the Colombian law. They also stated that the description by Barrera and Bartels was in violation of the ICZN Code of Ethics, which Barrera and Bartels denied and in any case the Code of Ethics is part of a section that zoologists are urged to follow (unlike most other sections of the ICZN code, which zoologists have to follow).

Subsequently, the editor-in-chief of The Condor voiced his strong discontent with the actions of ProAves, suggested the description by Barrera and Bartels conflicted with the very spirit of the ICZN Code, and stated that he felt ProAves had "maneuvered to trick the Condor out of considering your [Carantón's] manuscript so that ProAves could publish its own type description of the antpitta."

In 2011, the local government fined Carantón and ProAves (Carantón was employed by them when the specimens were collected) for breach of reporting requirements. ProAves maintain that the collection itself was irregular, but there was no such finding by the local government.

Another controversy pertains to determining the valid scientific name for the new species. The G. fenwickorum description was published before the G. urraoensis description (18 May 2010 vs 24 June 2010), thus everything else equal, the Principle of Priority dictates that G. fenwickorum would be the valid name, and G. urraoensis would be considered a junior synonym. However, the description of G. fenwickorum was unconventional in several respects. Instead of clearly designating a single specimen as the Type specimen, in a complex statement they designated both a sample of feathers and the photographed bird as the type specimen.

The rest of the description is also ambiguous regarding the nature of the type specimen. This ambiguity, by itself, may be considered problematic since the ICZN Code requires type specimens to be designated unambiguously in modern descriptions (ICZN Art. 16.4). The ambiguity also affects determining whether the type specimen was preserved (if it is the sample of feathers) or not (if it is the bird that was released). To complicate matters, there is evidence that the sample of feathers do not belong to the bird depicted in the article.

Because of these problems and other issues, it has been argued that Barrera and Bartels failed to comply with minimum requirements stipulated in the ICZN and thus the name fenwickorum is not available (i.e. not valid). Based on these arguments, the American Ornithologists' Union's South American Checklist Committee has accepted the species as G. urraoensis. (Members include Cadena, who abstained from the vote on the name, and Stiles, who voted for urraoensis.)

However, in 2018, the International Commission of Zoological Nomenclature rejected a petition to suppress the fenwickorum name, and ruled, in ICZN Opinion 2414, that "The available specific name Grallaria fenwickorum Barrera & Bartels in Barrera, Bartels & Fundación ProAves de Colombia, 2010 remains valid for the species of antpitta involved. The issue is left open for subsequent workers to make new proposals to the Commission." Setting aside a ruling given by the Commission without its consent is explicitly forbidden by the Code (ICZN Art. 80.9). As Opinion 2414 clearly indicates that Grallaria fenwickorum is available and valid, this is how it is to be treated, and the continued use of Grallaria urraoensis as the name of the species actually violates the Code.

Finally, the two descriptions also proposed different English names for the bird. Time will tell whether Fundación ProAves' English name, Fenwick's antpitta, or Carantón and Certuche's English name, Urrao antpitta, will prove more popular, but the only completely uninvolved authority that has taken a stance on this matter has avoided taking sides by coining a new name, Antioquia antpitta. Its known range is entirely within the Antioquia Department. The two articles that described the species proposed the same Spanish name, tororoi de Urrao.
