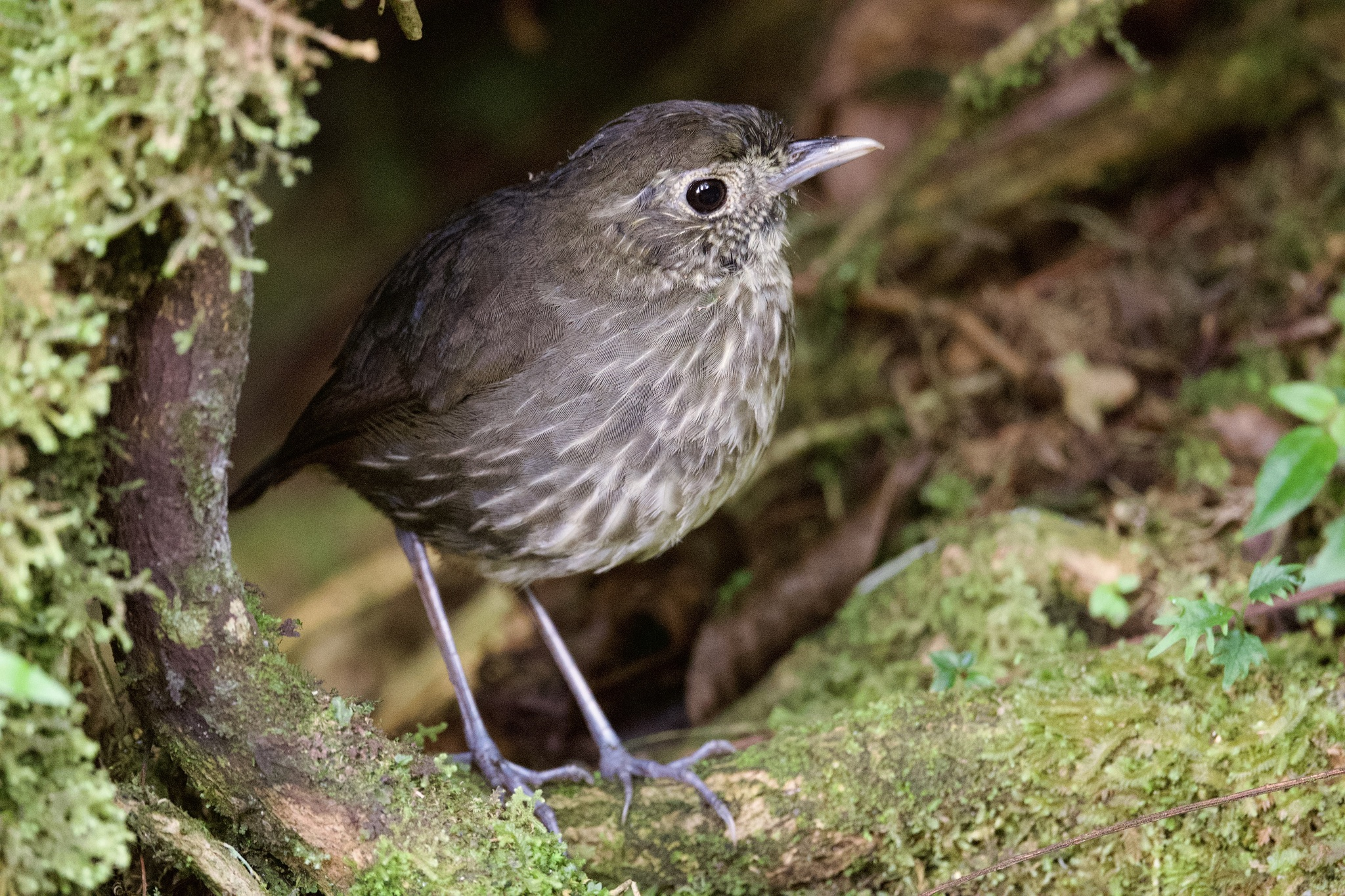

Conservation status
- Endangered (IUCN 3.1)

Scientific classification
- Kingdom: Animalia
- Phylum: Chordata
- Class: Aves
- Order: Passeriformes
- Family: Grallariidae
- Genus: Grallaria
- Species: G. kaestneri

Binomial name
- Grallaria kaestneri F.G. Stiles, 1992

= Cundinamarca antpitta =

Species of bird

The Cundinamarca antpitta (Grallaria kaestneri) is a species of bird in the family Grallariidae. It is endemic to Colombia.

== Taxonomy and systematics ==
The Cundinamarca antpitta was first discovered by Peter Kaestner, an American diplomat and amateur ornithologist who later became the first birder to see 10,000 bird species anywhere in the world. The genus name Grallaria is from the Neo-Latin grallarius, meaning "stilt-walker". The specific epithet kaestneri recognizes the bird's discoverer, Peter Kaestner. The Cundinamarca antpitta's English name refers to the Cundinamarca Department, within which the entire population of the species was believed to reside.

When first described, the Cundinamarca antpitta was believed to be most closely related to the Santa Marta antpitta (G. bangsi). A 2020 study confirmed that they are sister species and closely related to the brown-banded antpitta (G. milleri) and Urrao antpitta (G. urraoensis), a conclusion due in part to details of the immatures' plumage.

The Cundinamarca antpitta has no known subspecies.

== Description ==
The Cundinamarca antpitta is 15 to 16 cm (5.9 to 6.3 in) long. Three females weighed an average of 47.5 g (1.7 oz). The sexes have similar plumage at all ages. Overall the adult Cundinamarca antpitta is a dull olive-brown bird with white streaking on the underparts. The feathers of the bird's back are an olive-brown that are fringed with a thin band of sooty-black, giving the bird the appearance of possessing very faint barring. This fringe vanishes from the rump and uppertail coverts, and the antpitta's tail is slightly darker than its back. The wings are a richer brown than the rest of the upperparts, while the underwing is a buffy cinnamon. The underparts are mostly olive-brown fading to a dull white on the bird's belly. The sides and flanks are covered with dull white streaking. The face and throat are a dull olive and slightly mottled, and the bird has pale streaking behind the ears.

While no similar antpittas have been found to share the Cundinamarca antpitta's habitat, making it unlikely to be confused with another species, it is distinguished from the similar Santa Marta antpitta by being darker overall and by range.

== Distribution and habitat ==
The Cundinamarca antpitta is known only on the eastern slope of Colombia's Eastern Andes, approximately between Monterredondo and Farallones de Medina in southwestern Cundinamarca and northwestern Meta departments. However, it appears to have been extirpated from the northern part of its historical range. It inhabits humid montane forest and mature secondary woodland, where it greatly favors dense vegetation in the understorey. It does occur at forest edges and gaps caused by fallen trees, but only when they have much low vegetation. In elevation it ranges between 1,700 and 2,500 m (5,600 and 8,200 ft).

== Behavior ==
=== Movement ===
The Cundinamarca antpitta is a year-round resident throughout its range.

=== Feeding ===
The Cundinamarca antpitta's diet has not been detailed but is known to include insects (adult and larval), spiders, and probably earthworms. It feeds almost exclusively on the ground and only rarely as high as 1 m (3 ft) above it. It hops and then pauses to probe the soil and move leaves to find prey, and seldom flies more than a few meters. "[W]ithin its dense habitat, the bird is not particularly shy, and may approach a motionless observer closely", which hints that it might forage in the wake of forest mammals such as tapirs.

=== Breeding ===
Evidence from observations and specimens suggests that the Cundinamarca antpitta breeds in the last half of the year. Nothing else is known about its breeding biology.

=== Vocalization ===
The Cundinamarca antpitta's song is "3 similar sharp, clear whistled notes that sound like wirt, wiirt weert!, although occasionally the final note is omitted...[e]ach successive note is slightly longer (0.14, 0.16, and 0.18 sec) and higher in pitch (ca 2.5, 2.8, and 2.9-3.0 kHz)." It also makes an "aggressive call...considerably higher in pitch, with a first note at 5.8-6.0 kHz, falling abruptly to a longer note at ca 5.0 kHz. This call sounds like SEEleee, the first part in particular being very sharp and piercing."

== Status ==
The IUCN originally in 1994 assessed the Cundinamarca antpitta as Vulnerable and since 2011 as Endangered. It has a very small range and its estimated population of between 330 and 800 mature individuals is believed to be decreasing. "The species is threatened by the loss and degradation of its habitat, mainly as a consequence of logging, clearance for small-scale agriculture and grazing by goats. The species has disappeared from completely cleared areas in the Farallondes de Medina and near Monterredondo." "However, selective logging may even favour the species, in contrast to clear-cutting, which is clearly a threat and has generally occurred up to altitudes of 1,500-2,000 m on the east slope." "[P]rojections of habitat loss as a consequence of deforestation suggest that between 2015 and 2040 the species may lose 46% of suitable habitat [so] the population may be declining by 20-29% over the next three generations." The Chingaza National Natural Park does host the Cundinamarca antpitta "but further protected areas will be crucial for the species' conservation and survival". Such a protected area, called Reserva Natural Refugio Tototoi, was created in 2023 by a partnership of the American Bird Conservancy, two Colombian non-governmental bodies, and a local family whose land adjoins the preserve. The reserve is a "446-acre (181-hectare) expanse of misty, highland, cloud forest".
