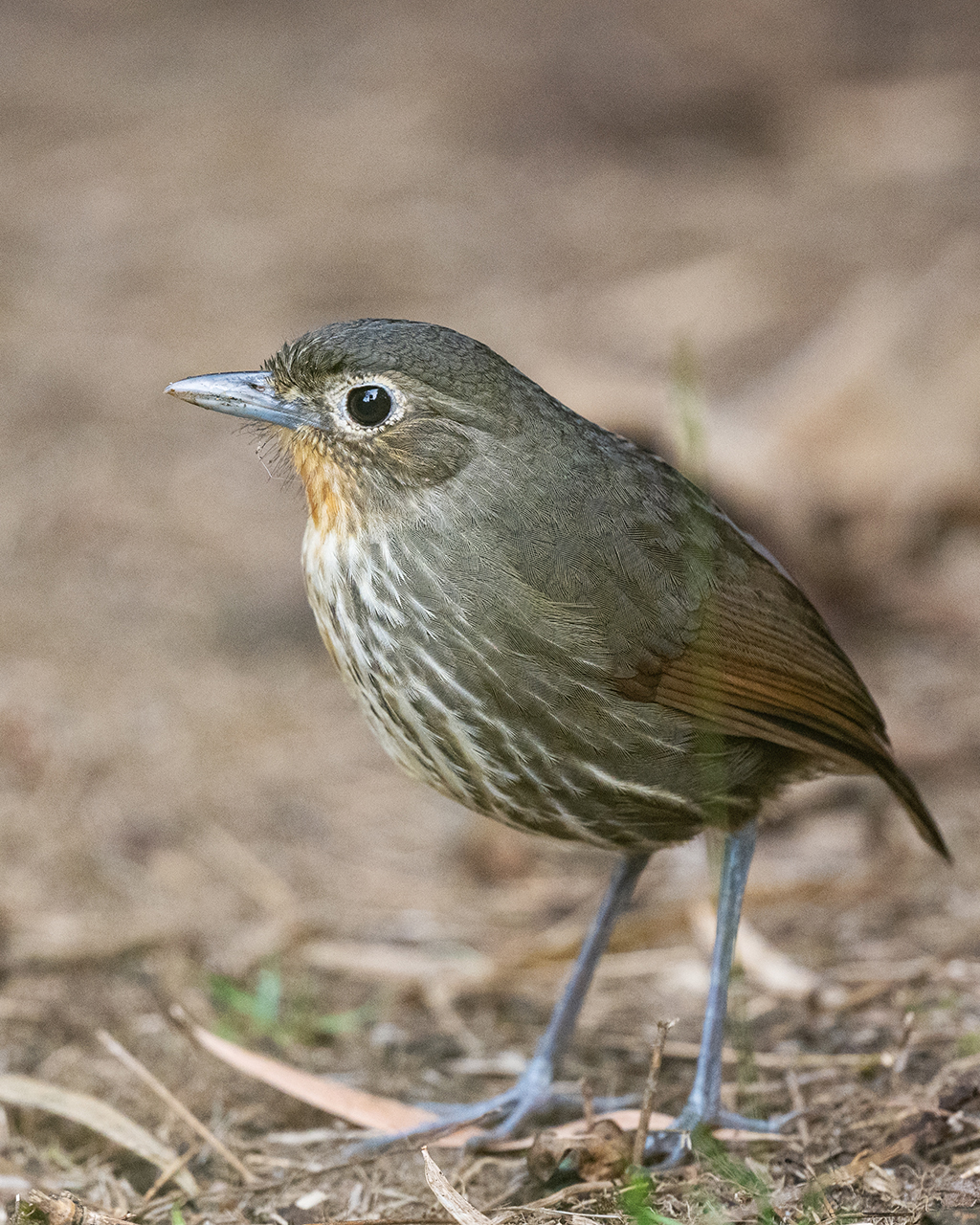

Conservation status
- Vulnerable (IUCN 3.1)

Scientific classification
- Kingdom: Animalia
- Phylum: Chordata
- Class: Aves
- Order: Passeriformes
- Family: Grallariidae
- Genus: Grallaria
- Species: G. bangsi

Binomial name
- Grallaria bangsi Allen, 1900

= Santa Marta antpitta =

Species of bird

The Santa Marta antpitta (Grallaria bangsi) is a Vulnerable species of bird in the family Grallariidae. It is endemic to Colombia.

== Taxonomy and systematics ==
The Santa Marta antpitta is monotypic. Its closest relative appears to be the Cundinamarca antpitta (G. kaestneri). Its specific epithet honors Outram Bangs.

== Description ==
Grallaria antpittas are a "wonderful group of plump and round antbirds whose feathers are often fluffed up...they have stout bills [and] very short tails". The Santa Marta antpitta is 17 to 18 cm (6.7 to 7.1 in) long; one male weighed 62 g (2.2 oz). The sexes have the same plumage. Adults have a mostly dark olive-brown crown, nape, and upperparts. Their flight feathers and tail are brownish olive. They have buffy whitish lores and a narrow buffy ring around their eye on an otherwise white-streaked olive-brown face. Their throat is deep ochraceous buff. Their underparts are whitish with wide dusky olive-brown streaks. Both sexes have a dark brown iris, a bluish gray bill, and dark gray to bluish gray or leaden blue legs and feet.

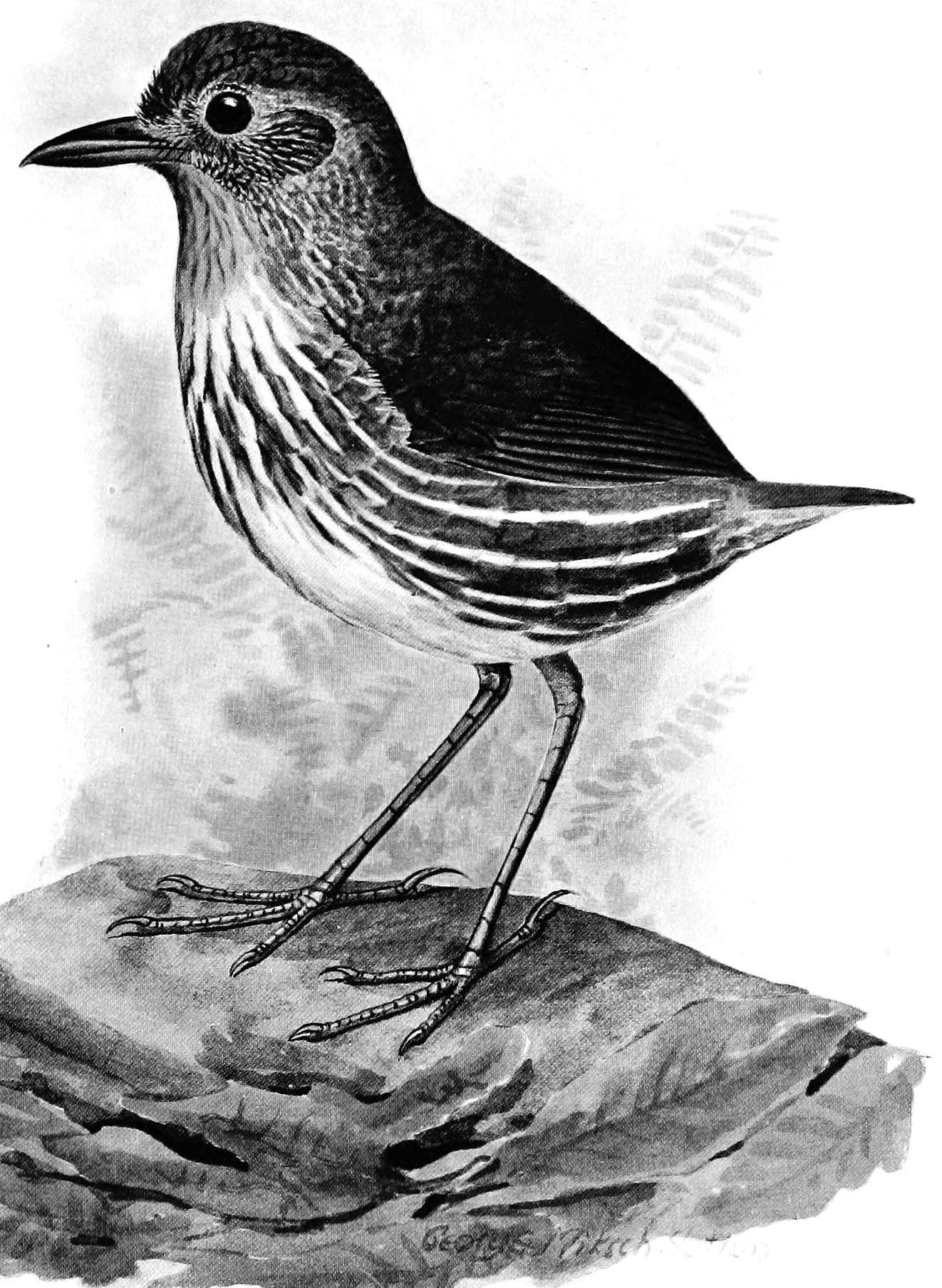
Illustration by George Miksch Sutton (1898-1982)

== Distribution and habitat ==
The Santa Marta antpitta is found only in the isolated Sierra Nevada de Santa Marta in northern Colombia's Magdalena Department. It inhabits the floor and understory in the interior and edges of humid cloudforest and mature secondary forest. It is frequently seen in clearings and along roadsides. In elevation it ranges from 1,200 to 2,500 m (3,900 to 8,200 ft) and perhaps somewhat higher. Most encounters are above 1,600 m (5,200 ft).

== Behavior ==
=== Movement ===
The Santa Marta antpitta is believed to be resident throughout its range.

=== Feeding ===
The Santa Marta antpitta is one of several antpittas that regularly come to feeding stations set up to allow viewing them. There they are fed earthworms and similar invertebrates, which are thought to also be a large part of their natural diet. In the wild they also feed on arthropods, seeds, and small vertebrates like frogs. They are almost entirely terrestrial, hopping on the ground to seek prey and only occasionally moving up to a low perch.

=== Breeding ===
The Santa Marta antpitta's apparent breeding season spans at least from September to January. Nothing else is known about its breeding biology.

=== Vocalization ===
The Santa Marta antpitta's song is "2½ whistled notes, upslurred and interrogative at end". Its call is "a single, squeaky, rising queet".

== Status ==
The IUCN has assessed the Santa Marta antpitta as Vulnerable. It has a small range and its estimated population of 19,000 mature individuals is believed to be decreasing. "The Sierra Nevada de Santa Marta is increasingly being destroyed and fragmented by illegal agricultural expansion, logging and burning. Only about 15% of the sierra's vegetation is unaltered, and the species' range has probably lost about 40% of original forests." It is considered common within its limited range but "severe degradation of remaining forest habitat [despite] formal protection in the Parque Nacional Natural Sierra Nevada de Santa Marta, may lead to an upgrade in its threat status in the near future."
