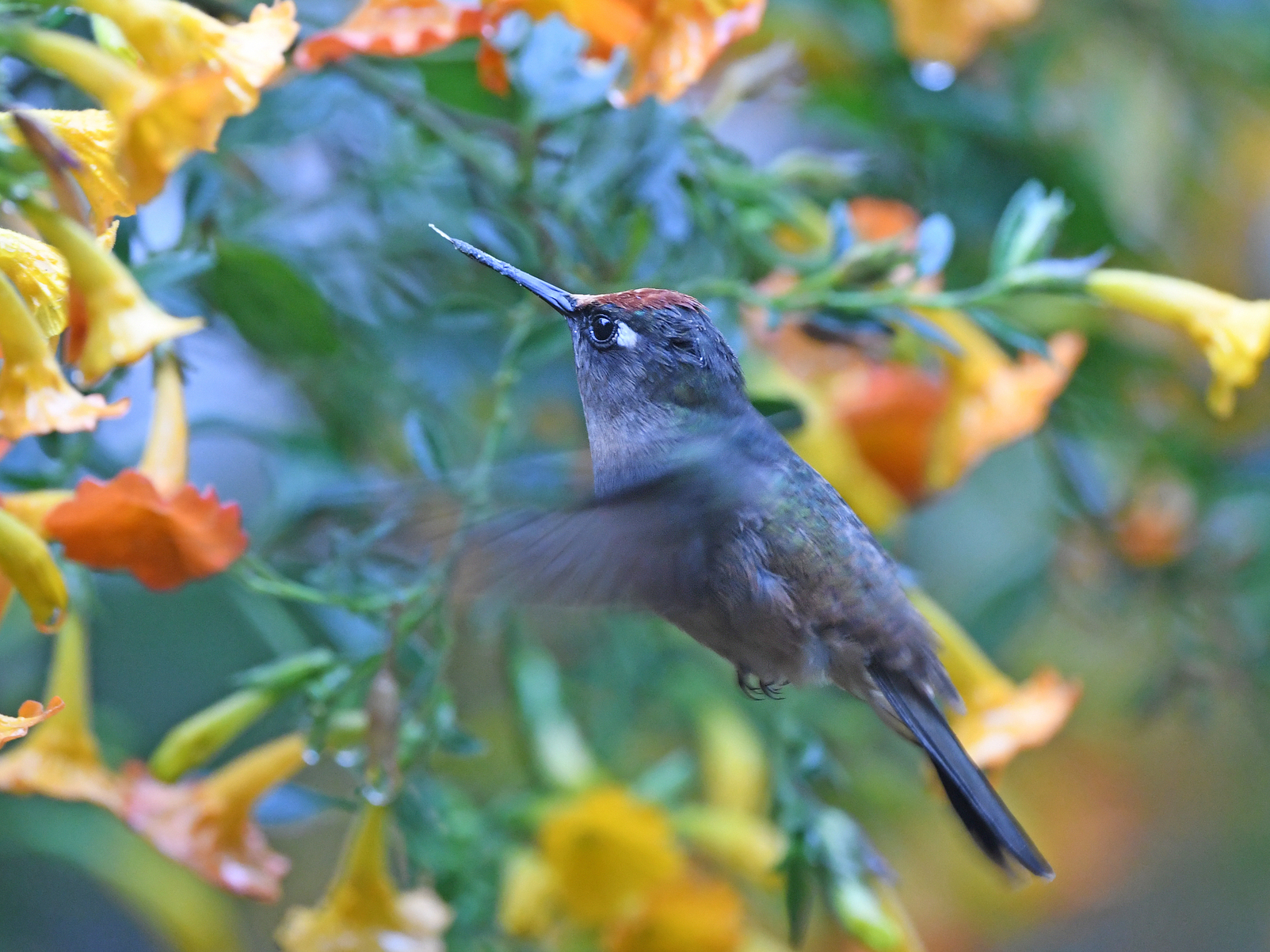

Conservation status
- Vulnerable (IUCN 3.1)
- CITES Appendix II

Scientific classification
- Kingdom: Animalia
- Phylum: Chordata
- Class: Aves
- Order: Apodiformes
- Family: Trochilidae
- Genus: Anthocephala
- Species: A. floriceps

Binomial name
- Anthocephala floriceps (Gould, 1853)

= Santa Marta blossomcrown =

Species of hummingbird

The Santa Marta blossomcrown (Anthocephala floriceps) is a Vulnerable species of hummingbird in the "emeralds", tribe Trochilini of subfamily Trochilinae. It endemic to the Sierra Nevada de Santa Marta of Colombia.

== Taxonomy and systematics ==
Anthocephala floriceps was originally called the blossomcrown and included what are now the Santa Marta blossomcrown and Tolima blossomcrown (Anthocephala berlepschi) as subspecies. A study by Lozano-Jaramillo et al. published in 2014 found that the two differed greatly both genetically and in their climatic niches. The South American Classification Committee of the American Ornithological Society and worldwide taxonomic systems soon adopted the split. The Santa Marta blossomcrown is monotypic.

== Description ==
The Santa Marta blossomcrown is about 8.4 cm (3.3 in) long. Both sexes have a straight black bill. The adult male has a buffy white forehead, a rufous chesnut hindcrown, mostly shining green upperparts, and a rusty lower back and uppertail coverts. Its underparts are grayish buff. Its tail is bronzy green with buffy tips to the feathers, and all but the central pair of feathers also have a black bar near the tip. Females and immatures are similar to the adult male but their whole crown is brownish.

== Distribution and habitat ==
The Santa Marta blossomcrown is found only in the isolated Sierra Nevada de Santa Marta of northern Colombia. It inhabits humid primary forest and mature secondary forest between elevations of 400 and 1,700 m (1,300 and 5,600 ft).

== Behavior ==
=== Movement ===
The Santa Marta blossomcrown is assumed to be sedentary, but its possible seasonal elevational movements have not been studied.

=== Feeding ===
The Santa Marta blossomcrown typically forages low in the forest understory. Its diet has not been studied, and the only documented nectar source is flowering banana.

=== Breeding ===
The Santa Marta blossomcrown's breeding season apparently includes September and October. Males gather in leks to court females. Nothing else is known about its breeding phenology.

=== Vocalization ===
The Santa Marta blossomcrown's song is "a long series of repeated tsip notes".

== Status ==
The IUCN has assessed the Santa Marta blossomcrown as Vulnerable. It has a very small range and its population of fewer than 2500 mature individuals is believed to be decreasing. Much of its potential habitat has been cleared; what remains appears to be relatively stable though fragmented. Some of its remaining habitat is "at least nominally protected" in a national park and a foundation-owned preserve.
