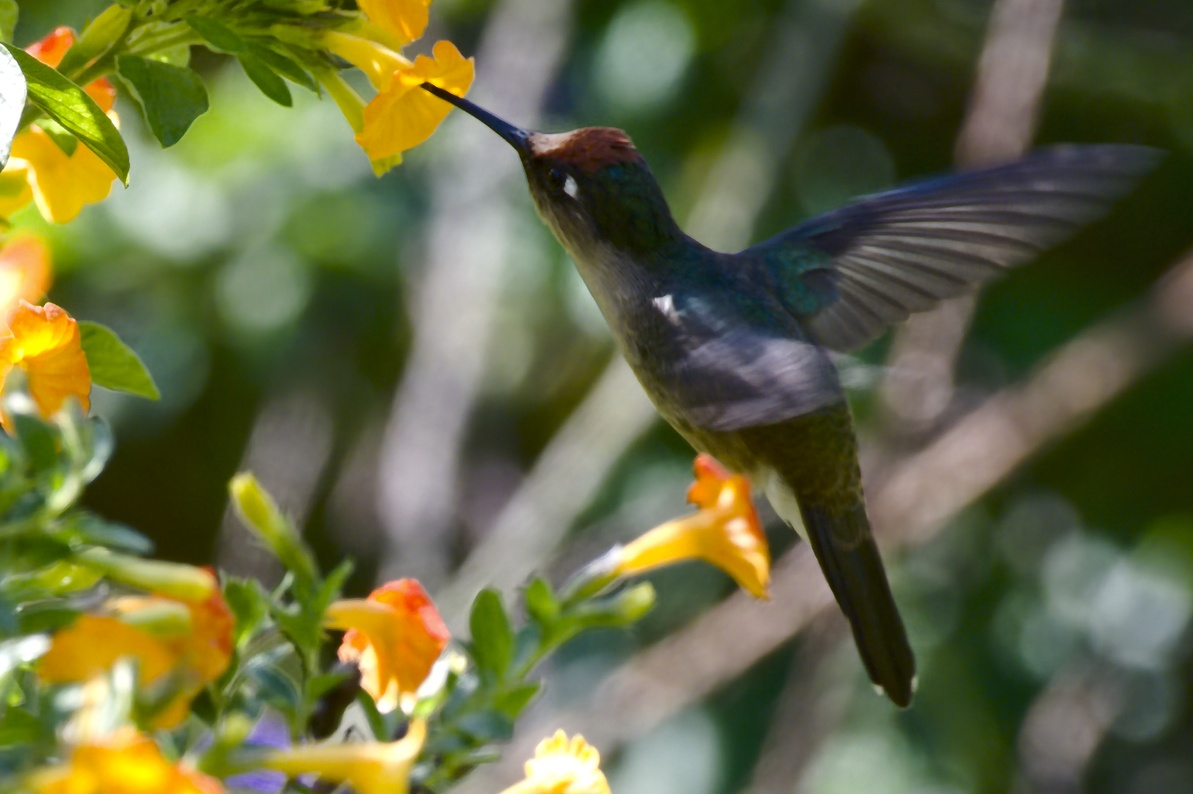

Conservation status
- Vulnerable (IUCN 3.1)
- CITES Appendix II (CITES)

Scientific classification
- Kingdom: Animalia
- Phylum: Chordata
- Class: Aves
- Clade: Strisores
- Order: Apodiformes
- Family: Trochilidae
- Genus: Anthocephala
- Species: A. berlepschi

Binomial name
- Anthocephala berlepschi Salvin, 1893

= Tolima blossomcrown =

Species of hummingbird

The Tolima blossomcrown (Anthocephala berlepschi) is a Vulnerable species of hummingbird in the "emeralds", tribe Trochilini of subfamily Trochilinae. It is endemic to Colombia.

== Taxonomy and systematics ==
The Tolima blossomcrown was originally treated as a subspecies of what was then the blossomcrown (Anthocephala floriceps), that also included what is now the Santa Marta blossomcrown. A study by Lozano-Jaramillo et al. published in 2014 found that the two differed greatly both genetically and in their climatic niches. The South American Classification Committee of the American Ornithological Society and worldwide taxonomic systems soon adopted the split; the Santa Marta blossomcrown retained the "parent's" binomial A. floriceps. The Tolima blossomcrown is monotypic.

== Description ==
The Tolima blossomcrown is about 8.4 cm (3.3 in) long. Both sexes have a straight black bill. The adult male has a buffy white forehead, a rufous chesnut hindcrown, mostly shining green upperparts, and a rusty lower back and uppertail coverts. Its underparts are grayish buff. Its tail is bronzy green with wide white tips to the feathers, and all but the central pair of feathers also have a black bar near the tip. Females and immatures are similar to the adult male but their whole crown is brownish.

== Distribution and habitat ==
The Tolima blossomcrown is found in Colombia's upper Magdalena River Valley where it flows through Cauca, northern Huila, Tolima, and Quindío departments. It inhabits the interior and edges of humid primary forest and mature secondary forest between elevations of 1,200 and 2,500 m (3,900 and 8,200 ft).

== Behavior ==
=== Movement ===
The Tolima blossomcrown is assumed to be sedentary, but its possible seasonal elevational movements have not been studied.

=== Feeding ===
The Tolima blossomcrown's foraging strategy and diet have not been studied. It is believed to forage low in the forest understory like the Santa Marta blossomcrown.

=== Breeding ===
The Tolima blossomcrown's breeding phenology has not been studied.

=== Vocalization ===
The Tolima blossomcrown's song is "a long series of repeated tsip notes".

== Status ==
The IUCN has assessed the Tolima blossomcrown as Vulnerable. It has a small range and its population of fewer than 4500 mature individuals is believed to be decreasing. Much of its former habitat has been cleared for agriculture, and remaining forest is fragmented. It does occur in two national parks.
