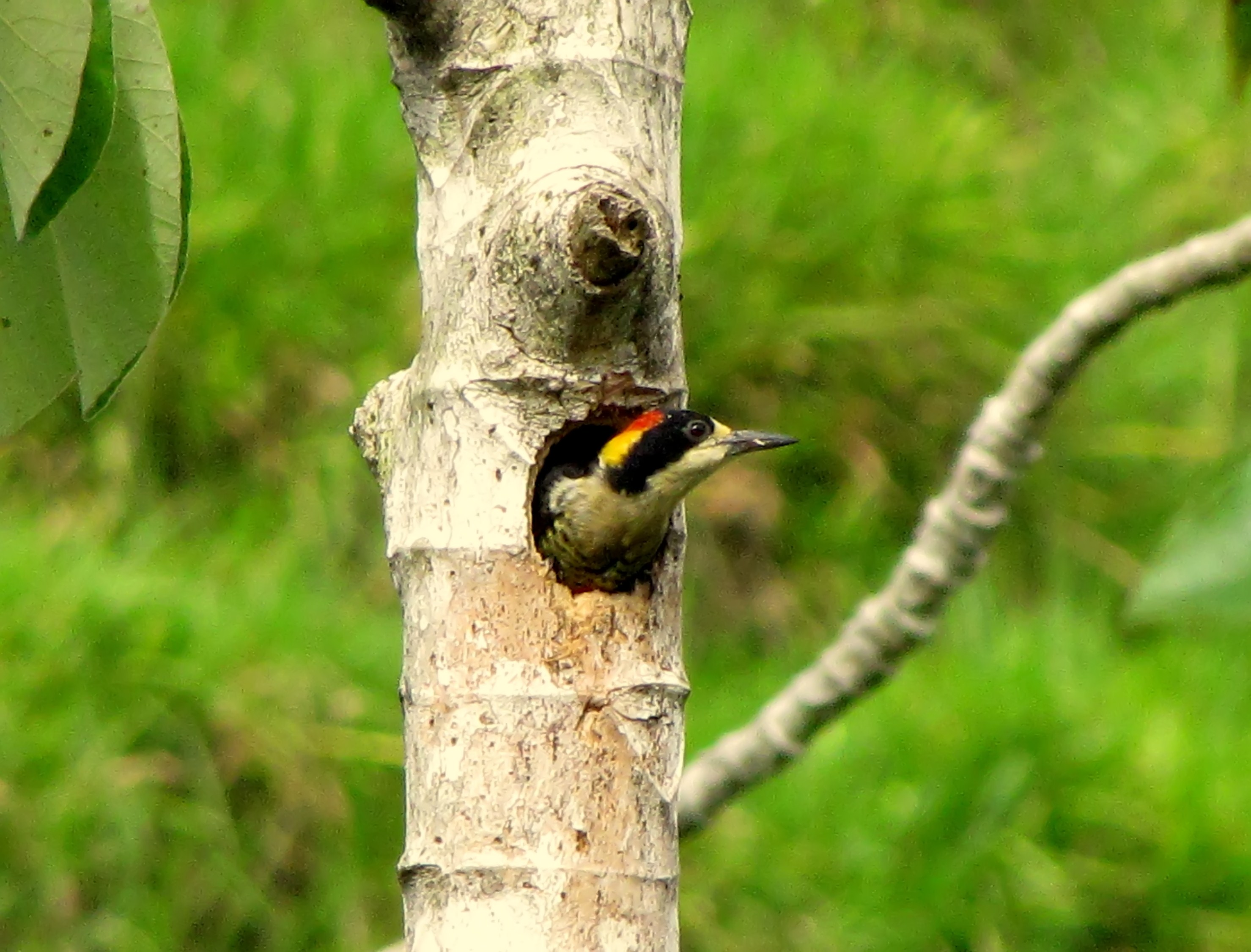

Conservation status
- Least Concern (IUCN 3.1)

Scientific classification
- Kingdom: Animalia
- Phylum: Chordata
- Class: Aves
- Order: Piciformes
- Family: Picidae
- Genus: Melanerpes
- Species: M. pulcher

Binomial name
- Melanerpes pulcher Sclater, PL, 1870

Synonyms
- Tripsurus pulcher

= Beautiful woodpecker =

Species of bird

The beautiful woodpecker (Melanerpes pulcher) is a species of bird in subfamily Picinae of the woodpecker family Picidae. It is endemic to Colombia.

== Taxonomy and systematics ==
From about the middle of the 20th century until early in the 21st century most taxonomic systems treated the beautiful woodpecker and the golden-naped woodpecker (M. chrysauchen) as conspecific. The combined species and several others were for a time placed in genus Tripsurus. The beautiful woodpecker is monotypic.

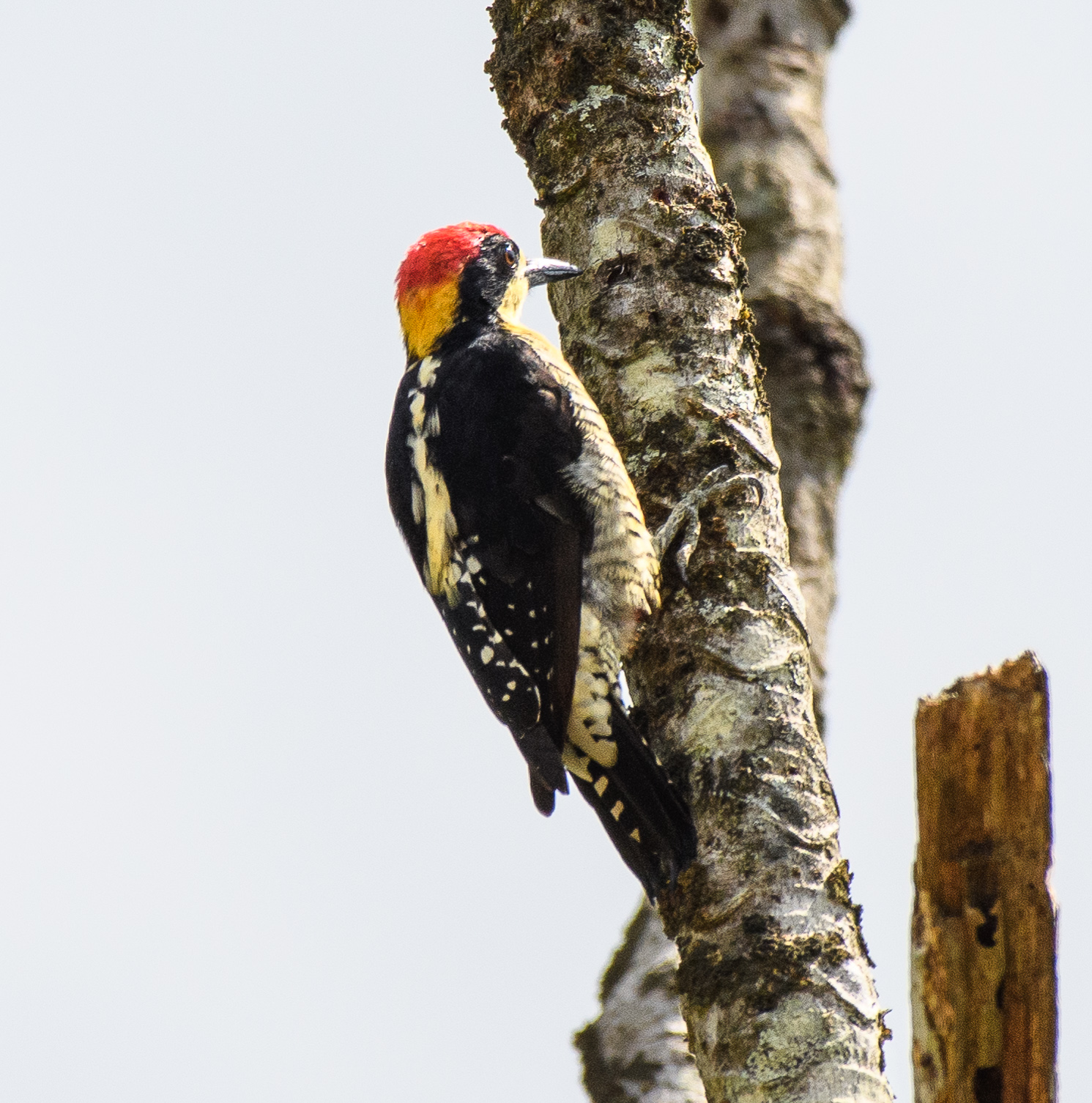
Adult male beautiful woodpecker

== Description ==
The beautiful woodpecker is about 17 to 18 cm (6.7 to 7.1 in) long. The sexes are alike except for their head pattern. Adult males have a whitish forehead, a scarlet crown, and a golden yellow lower nape and hindneck. Adult females have the same whitish forehead and yellow hindneck but a black forecrown and a scarlet hind crown and nape. Both sexes have black around the eye that extends down the side of the neck. Their lores, cheeks, chin, throat, and breast are white to cream or pale yellow. Their mantle and upper wings are mainly black, with some white barring of the flight feathers, and the back and rump are white, sometimes blotched with black. Their tail is brownish black, the lower breast, belly, and flanks are barred black and white, and there is a red patch on mid-belly. Their iris is very dark brown, the beak is blackish with a paler base, and the legs are gray. Juveniles are duller than adults, their black areas are browner, the underparts' barring is less contrasting, and the belly patch is smaller and more orange.

== Distribution and habitat ==
The beautiful woodpecker is endemic to the valley of the Magdalena River in north central Colombia. It primarily inhabits mature open forests, both dry and humid. It sometimes occurs in plantations, and occasionally in fragmented and secondary forest. In elevation it ranges between 400 and 1,500 m (1,300 and 4,900 ft).

== Behavior ==
=== Movement ===
The beautiful woodpecker lives year-round in its habitat.

=== Feeding ===
The beautiful woodpecker mostly forages high in the forest, in the canopy and just below it. It feeds on insects including adult and larval wood-boring beetles and winged termites; it sometimes hawks flying insects above the tops of the trees. In addition to insects, it feeds on fruit including figs, bananas, and fruits of the Cecropia tree.

=== Breeding ===
The beautiful woodpecker's breeding season is thought to be from February or March to June or July, but nothing else is known about its breeding biology.

=== Vocal and non-vocal sounds ===
The beautiful woodpecker's most common call is "loud, rather squeaky, sometimes more guttural, [and] usually of 3 notes". It also makes "rattling trills" and a "churring call". Both sexes are believed to drum.

== Status ==
The IUCN has assessed the beautiful woodpecker as being of Least Concern. Though it has a limited range and its population size is not known, the latter is believed to be stable. No immediate threats have been identified. The species "appears to be rather scarce and local throughout."
