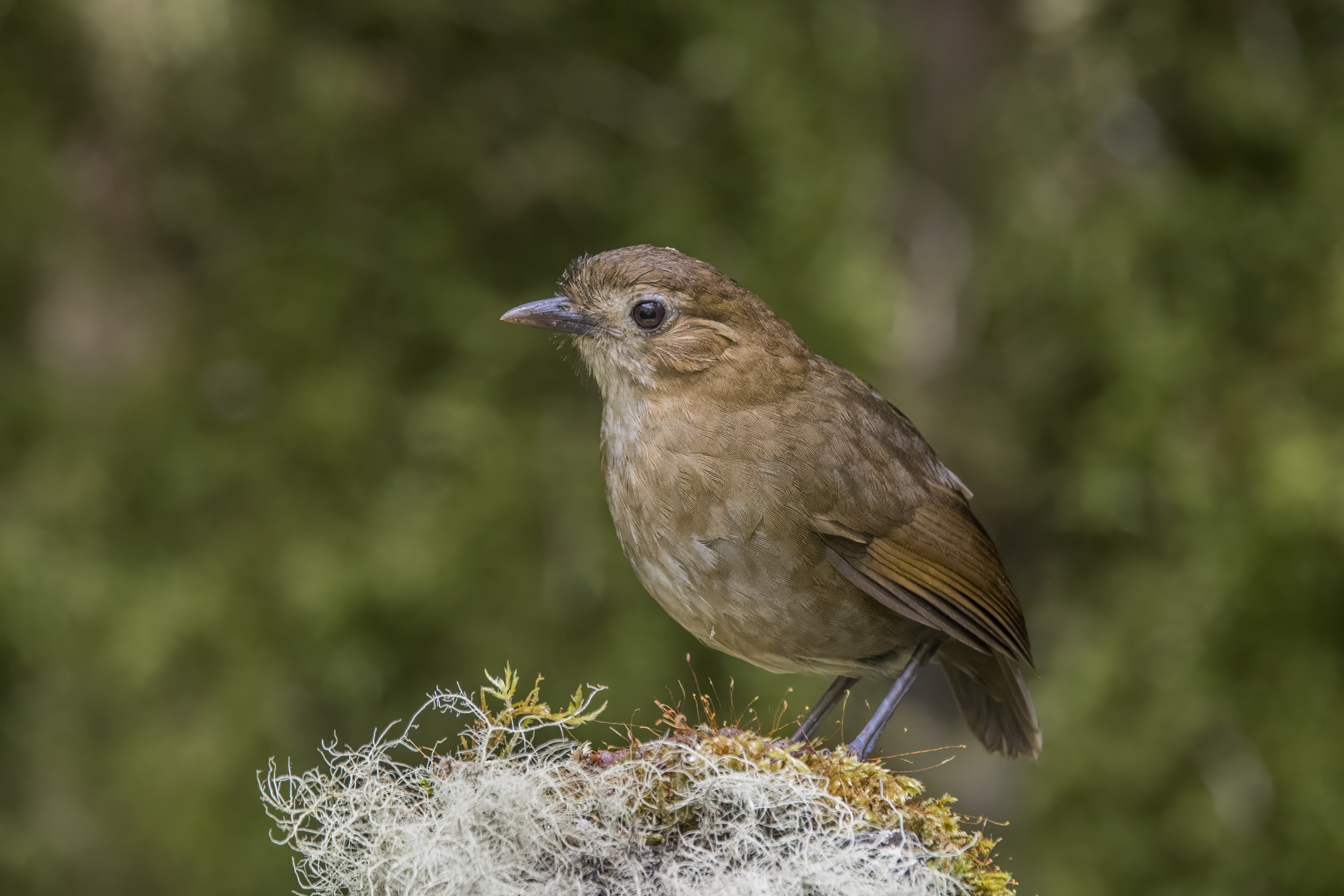
- in Caldas, Colombia

Conservation status
- Vulnerable (IUCN 3.1)

Scientific classification
- Kingdom: Animalia
- Phylum: Chordata
- Class: Aves
- Order: Passeriformes
- Family: Grallariidae
- Genus: Grallaria
- Species: G. milleri

Binomial name
- Grallaria milleri Chapman, 1912

= Brown-banded antpitta =

Species of bird

The brown-banded antpitta (Grallaria milleri) is a vulnerable species of bird in the family Grallariidae. It is endemic to Colombia.

== Taxonomy and systematics ==
The brown-banded antpitta has two subspecies, the nominate G. m. milleri (Chapman, 1912) and G. m. gilesi (Salaman, Donegan & Prŷs-Jones, 2009). Subspecies G. m. gilesi was described in 2009 from a specimen collected in the 1800s and is known only from that specimen. Worldwide taxonomic systems have recognized the subspecies but some authors have not.

== Description ==
The brown-banded antpitta is 13 to 18 cm (5.1 to 7.1 in) long and weighs about 50 to 55 g (1.8 to 1.9 oz). The sexes have the same plumage. Adults have whitish lores with black speckles. Their ear coverts are ochraceous brown. Their crown, nape, back, and uppertail coverts are deep rich raw umber and their rump slightly paler. Their tail can be more rufescent or slightly more greenish than their back. Their wings are generally similar to their tail with dusky brown primaries and raw umber coverts. Their throat is grayish white with tawny olive sides. They have a wide tawny olive breast band, sides and flanks tending to olivaceous, a creamy white central belly, and mixed gray and olivaceous undertail coverts. Subspecies G. m. gilesi is larger than the nominate but otherwise essentially the same. Both subspecies have a dark brown iris, a black bill with a paler tip, and slate gray to blackish legs and feet.

== Distribution and habitat ==
The nominate subspecies of the brown-banded antpitta is found in the Central Andes of Colombia. It is known from Caldas Department to Quindío Department on the western slope and in Tolima Department on the eastern slope. The specimen of subspecies G. m. gilesi was collected in Antioquia Department but there are no additional records from there. The species inhabits the temperate zone in areas that are regrowing with Chusquea bamboo or alder trees (Alnus acuminata) following natural disturbance like a landslide. In elevation it mostly ranges between 2,700 and 3,200 m (8,900 and 10,500 ft) but there are records as low as 1,800 m (5,900 ft).

== Behavior ==
=== Movement ===
The brown-banded antpitta is believed to be a year-round resident throughout its range.

=== Feeding ===
The brown-banded antpitta is one of several antpittas that regularly come to feeding stations set up to view them. There they are fed earthworms and beetle larvae, which are thought to also be a part of their natural diet. Its diet otherwise is not well documented but it is assumed to feed on a variety of insects and other invertebrates. It forages on or near the ground, running and hopping between stops to pick prey from vegetation or the ground. It occasionally joins mixed-species feeding flocks and also occasionally attends army ant swarms.

=== Breeding ===
Nothing is known about the brown-banded antpitta's breeding biology.

=== Vocalization ===
The brown-banded antpitta's song is a "single upslurred uuueee"; it also makes a "3-note tu, tu-tu". Its call is a "single loud shrill note KEEEE" given in a series. The species sings at any time of the year, mostly during the morning, and typically from a low perch in dense undergrowth.

== Status ==
The IUCN originally in 1988 assessed the brown-banded antpitta as Threatened, then in 1994 as Endangered, and since 2012 as Vulnerable. It has a small range and its estimated population of between 10,000 and 20,000 mature individuals is believed to be decreasing. "Most forest below 3,300 m in the Central Andes has long been converted to agricultural land-use. In the Toche valley, this has primarily taken place since the 1950s, mostly for coffee plantations, potatoes, beans and cattle-grazing." It occurs in several protected areas. "Given that this species appears tolerant, to some degree, of human alteration of its habitat, it may not be under extreme threat except in areas of complete forest clearing."
