= Black-hooded antthrush =

Conservation status
- Not evaluated (IUCN 3.1)

Scientific classification
- Kingdom: Animalia
- Phylum: Chordata
- Class: Aves
- Order: Passeriformes
- Family: Formicariidae
- Genus: Formicarius
- Species: F. destructus

Binomial name
- Formicarius destructus Hartert, 1898
- Range

Species of bird

The black-hooded antthrush (Formicarius destructus) is a species of bird in the antthrush family Formicariidae. It is found in tropical Pacific Colombia and western Ecuador. It was formerly considered to be conspecific with the black-capped antthrush (Formicarius nigricapillus) and together they were known as the "black-headed antthrush".

== Taxonomy and systematics ==
The black-hooded antthrush was formally described in 1898 by the German ornithologist Ernst Hartert based on a badly damaged specimen collected by William Rosenberg at Paramba, a farm at 3,500 ft (1,100 m) on the western bank of the Mira River in Esmeraldas Province of northern Ecuador. Hartert considered the specimen to be a subspecies of the black-faced antthrush and coined the trinomial name Formicarius analis destructus. The epithet destructus is Latin meaning "destroyed" or "ruined". The black-hooded antthrush was formerly treated as a subspecies of the black-capped antthrush (Formicarius nigricapillus) but is now considered as a separate species based on differences in plumage, vocalization and morphology. The species is monotypic: no subspecies are recognised.
