= Rufous-fronted antthrush =

Conservation status
- Least Concern (IUCN 3.1)

Scientific classification
- Kingdom: Animalia
- Phylum: Chordata
- Class: Aves
- Order: Passeriformes
- Family: Formicariidae
- Genus: Formicarius
- Species: F. rufifrons

Binomial name
- Formicarius rufifrons Blake, 1957
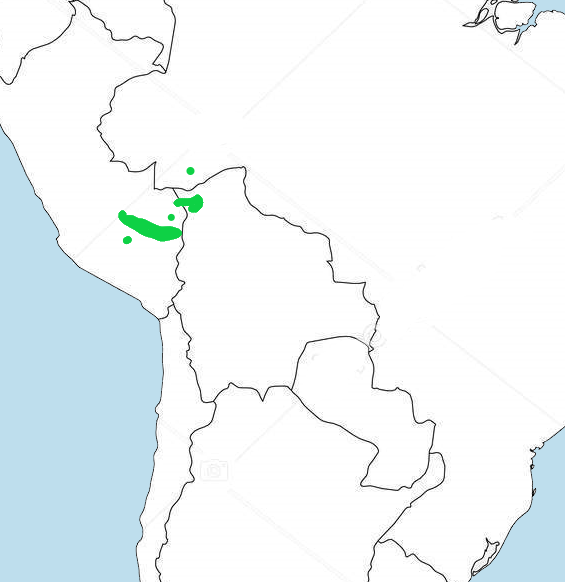

Species of bird

The rufous-fronted antthrush (Formicarius rufifrons) is a species of bird in the family Formicariidae. It is found in Bolivia, Brazil, and Peru.

== Taxonomy and systematics ==
The rufous-fronted antthrush is monotypic. Its exact placement within genus Formicarius has not been determined but its closest relative appears to be the black-faced antthrush (F. analis).

== Description ==
The rufous-fronted antthrush is about 18 cm (7.1 in) long; one male weighed 54 g (1.9 oz) and one female 57 g (2.0 oz). The sexes have the same plumage. Adults have a bright orange rufous forehead ("front") that extends to their bill and their eye. Their rear crown and upper back are olive brown, their lower back medium brown, and their rump and uppertail coverts rufescent brown. Their face and throat are sooty gray that extends down to their breast. Their flight feathers and upperwing coverts are medium brown with pale cinnamon edges. Their tail is black with brown outer edges on the inner feathers. Their belly is a paler gray than their breast, their vent area and undertail coverts are rufous brown, and their flanks are brownish olive. They have a brown iris, a black bill, and dull pink legs and feet.

== Distribution and habitat ==
The rufous-fronted antthrush is a bird of the far western Amazon Basin of southeastern Peru, extreme northwestern Bolivia, and just slightly in far western Brazil. It occurs in the drainages of the Madre de Dios, Jurua, and Urubamba rivers. It inhabits the edges and interior of floodplain forest with a dense understory of bamboo or especially Heliconia.

== Behavior ==
=== Movement ===
The rufous-fronted antthrush is a year-round resident throughout its range.

=== Feeding ===
The rufous-fronted antthrush feeds primarily on a variety of arthropods, mostly insects but including centipedes and small snails. It is almost entirely terrestrial. It walks slowly and deliberately with its tail cocked like a little rail. It has not been observed foraging but is assumed to sweep or flick aside leaf litter likes other members of its genus.

=== Breeding ===
Nothing is known about the rufous-fronted antthrush's breeding biology.

=== Vocalization ===
The rufous-fronted antthrush's song is "a series of piping notes; pitch of song rises in middle before falling to slightly below the original pitch: hu-hu-hu-HWEE-HWEE-WHEE-hew-hu-hu-hu-hu-hu-hu". Its call is "a loud, ringing TCHEW!".

== Status ==
The IUCN originally in 1988 assessed the rufous-fronted antthrush as Threatened, then in 1994 as Vulnerable, in 2004 as Near Threatened, and since 2023 as of Least Concern. Its estimated population of between 20,000 and 50,000 mature individuals is believed to be decreasing. It has very specialized habitat requirements and "is threatened by the loss and conversion of its habitat for human settlements and agricultural developments". "However, large tracts of undisturbed habitat remains within the range further away from settlements. Moreover, small-scale clearance of riverine forests may benefit the species by creating its preferred mosaic of open and forested habitat." It is considered rare and local in Peru and rare in Brazil. Its known distribution includes two large conservation areas in Peru.
