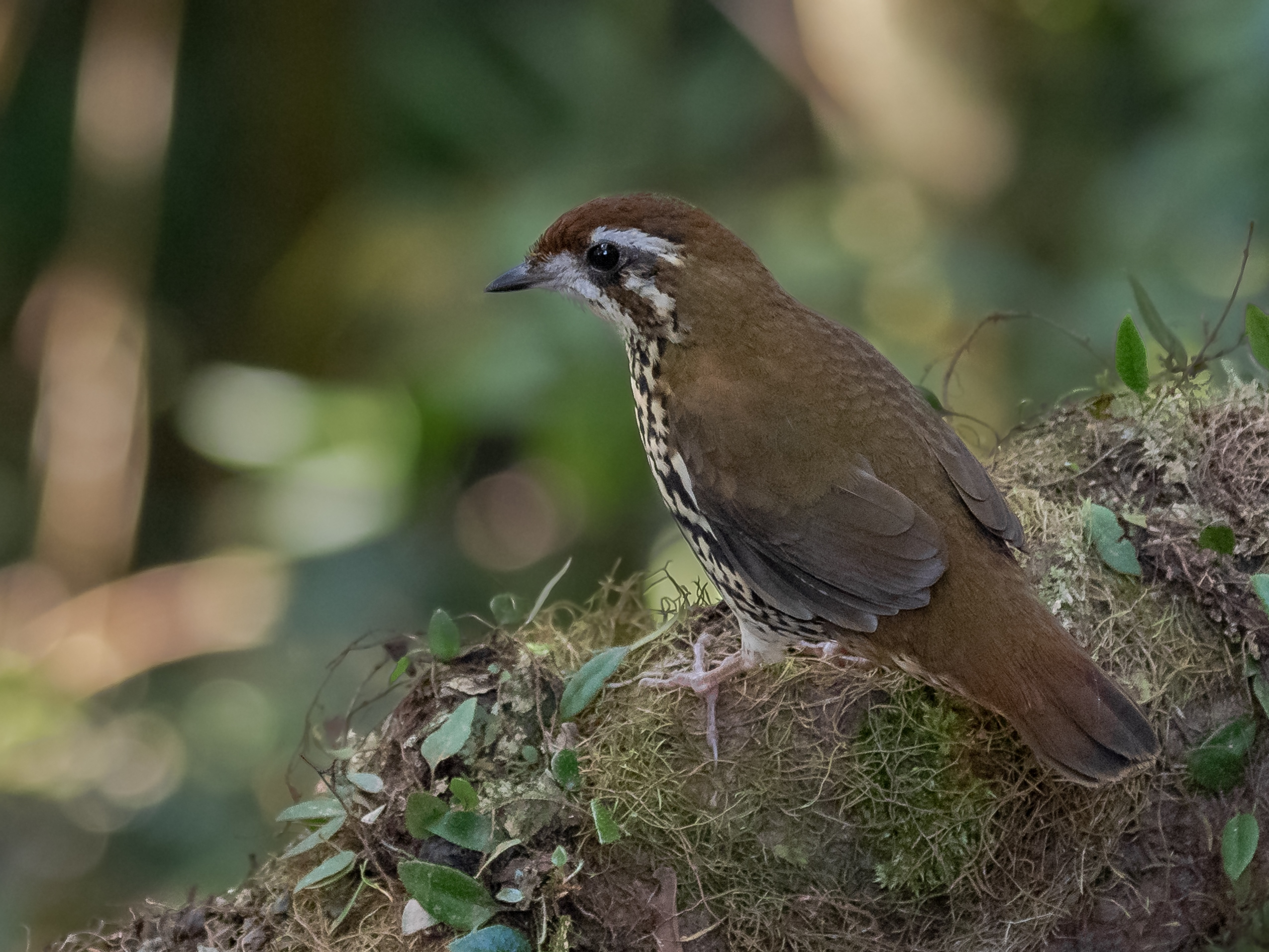

Conservation status
- Least Concern (IUCN 3.1)

Scientific classification
- Kingdom: Animalia
- Phylum: Chordata
- Class: Aves
- Order: Passeriformes
- Family: Formicariidae
- Genus: Chamaeza
- Species: C. meruloides

Binomial name
- Chamaeza meruloides Vigors, 1825
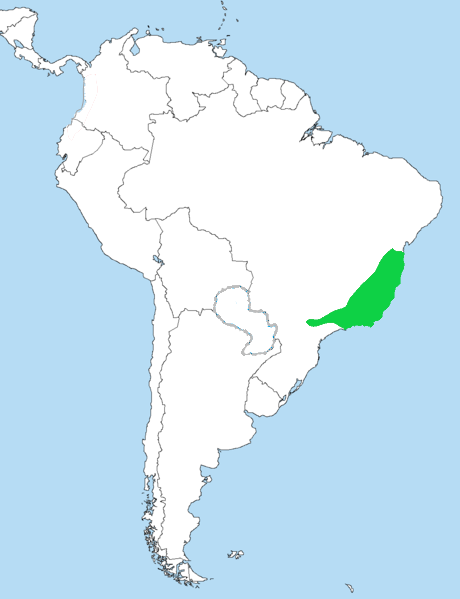

= Cryptic antthrush =

Species of bird

The cryptic antthrush (Chamaeza meruloides), also known as Such's antthrush, is a species of bird in the family Formicariidae. It is endemic to the Atlantic Forest in southeastern Brazil.

== Taxonomy and systematics ==
Although the cryptic antthrush was first described almost 200 years ago, it was long overlooked (hence, cryptic) due to confusion with the rufous-tailed antthrush (C. ruficauda) and short-tailed antthrush (C. campanisona), which are found in the same region. Its identity as a separate species was recognized in 1992.

When Nicholas Aylward Vigors described this species in 1825, he based it on two specimens collected by George Such, and this is the reason for the species' other common name, Such's antthrush.

The cryptic antthrush is monotypic.

== Description ==
The cryptic antthrush is 19 to 19.5 cm (7.5 to 7.7 in) long and weighs about 66 to 77 g (2.3 to 2.7 oz). The sexes are alike. Adults have a red-brown forecrown and brown crown. They have white or buff lores and a white streak behind their eye. Their upperparts are mostly olive brown with a reddish rump. Their tail is brown with a black band near the end and thin buffy tips on the feathers. Their throat is white or buffy white. Their underparts are mostly buffy white with black streaks on their sides and flanks and their crissum is deep buff. Their iris is brown to reddish brown, their bill dusky brown, and their legs and feet dusky brown.

== Distribution and habitat ==
The cryptic antthrush is found in the coastal mountains of southeastern Brazil from southern Bahia to northeastern Santa Catarina. It inhabits the floor of the interior and edges of humid montane forest. In elevation it mostly occurs between 200 and 1,500 m (700 and 4,900 ft) though occasionally lower.

== Behavior ==
=== Movement ===
The cryptic antthrush is believed to be a year-round resident throughout its range.

=== Feeding ===
The cryptic antthrush's diet and foraging behavior are not known in detail. It is almost entirely terrestrial. It walks slowly and deliberately on the forest floor and along roots and logs while hunting for invertebrates.

=== Breeding ===
Nothing is known about the cryptic antthrush's breeding biology.

=== Vocalization ===
The cryptic antthrush's song is "a long series of 20-40 hollow notes, loudest near the middle and quieter at the beginning and end". "One described call is an abrupt quick! note".

== Status ==
The IUCN has assessed the cryptic antthrush as being of Least Concern. Its population size is not known and is believed to be stable. No immediate threats have been identified. One researcher "found [the Cryptic] Antthrush in partially logged forest habitat, suggesting it may be tolerant of some level of human disturbance".
