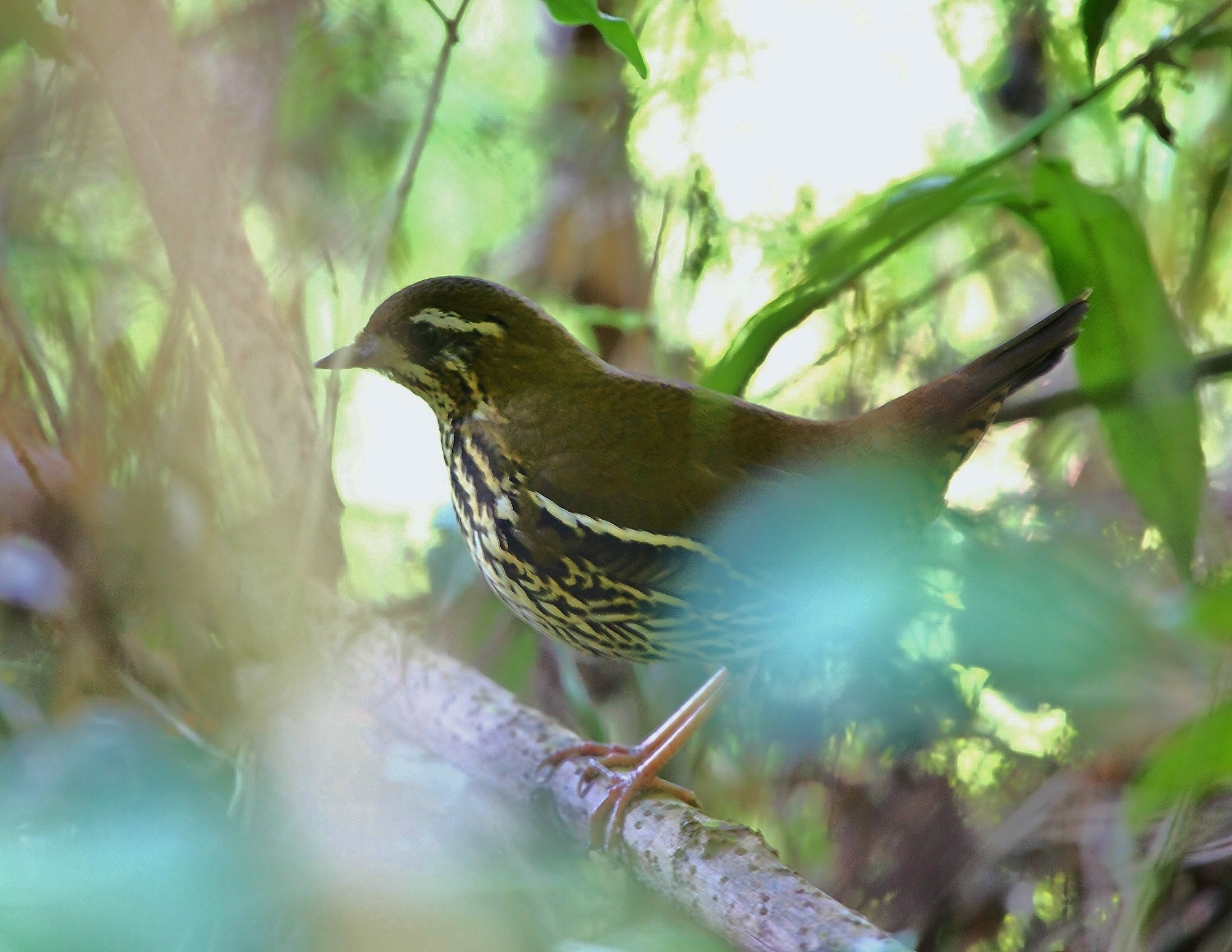

Conservation status
- Least Concern (IUCN 3.1)

Scientific classification
- Kingdom: Animalia
- Phylum: Chordata
- Class: Aves
- Order: Passeriformes
- Family: Formicariidae
- Genus: Chamaeza
- Species: C. ruficauda

Binomial name
- Chamaeza ruficauda Cabanis & Heine, 1860

= Rufous-tailed antthrush =

Species of bird

The rufous-tailed antthrush or Brazilian antthrush (Chamaeza ruficauda) is a species of bird in the family Formicariidae. It is found in Argentina and Brazil.

== Taxonomy and systematics ==
The rufous-tailed antthrush was formerly treated as conspecific with Schwartz's antthrush (C. turdina). In addition, what is now the cryptic antthrush (C. meruloides) was long confused with the rufous-tailed and the short-tailed antthrush (C. campanisona); their geographic ranges overlap though they generally are found at different elevations. Their differences were not fully recognized until 1992.

In the late twentieth and early twenty-first centuries several authors and taxonomic systems called Chamaeza ruficauda the Brazilian Antthrush.

The rufous-tailed antthrush is monotypic.

== Description ==
The rufous-tailed antthrush is 19 to 20 cm (7.5 to 7.9 in) long and weighs about 63 to 125 g (2.2 to 4.4 oz). The sexes are alike. Adults have a rufescent brown crown. They have white lores, a white streak behind their eye, and a whitish streak on the side of their neck. Their upperparts and wings are mostly rufescent brown with a less rufescent rump and uppertail coverts. Their tail is entirely rufescent brown. Their throat is white with small blackish spots that may look like a stripe. Their lower belly is white. The rest of their underparts are mostly buff that is darkest on the breast. They have black streaks on their sides and flanks and their crissum has black bars. Their iris is dark brown, their maxilla brownish black, their mandible pinkish white with black edges, and their legs and feet brownish gray with a light pink tinge.

== Distribution and habitat ==
The rufous-tailed antthrush is found in southeastern Brazil from eastern Minas Gerais and Espírito Santo south as far as northern Rio Grande do Sul and west slightly into northeastern Argentina's Misiones Province. It inhabits the interior and edges of humid montane forest and mature secondary woodlands, favoring areas with dense undergrowth. In elevation it ranges between 600 and 2,200 m (2,000 and 7,200 ft).

== Behavior ==
=== Movement ===
The rufous-tailed antthrush is believed to be a year-round resident throughout its range.

=== Feeding ===
The rufous-tailed antthrush's diet and foraging behavior are not known in detail, though it is known to feed on insects and spiders. It is almost entirely terrestrial. It walks slowly and deliberately on the forest floor, usually alone or in pairs.

=== Breeding ===
The rufous-tailed antthrush's breeding season has not been fully defined but includes November and December. One nest was in a tree cavity with a pad of leaves, fungal rhizomorphs, and grass; it contained two nestlings. The usual clutch size, incubation period, time to fledging, and details of parental care are not known.

=== Vocalization ===
The rufous-tailed antthrush's song is short, "a rapid series of hollow notes at even pace (12–15 per second), increasing in volume and pitch (0·8–1·4 kHz), levelling at end". Its call is a short trill written as "wh'h'h'ert". The species sings from a low perch.

== Status ==
The IUCN has assessed the rufous-tailed antthrush as being of Least Concern. Its population size is not known and is believed to be decreasing. No immediate threats have been identified. It is considered fairly common to common but scarce at the southern end of its range. It occurs in several protected areas.
