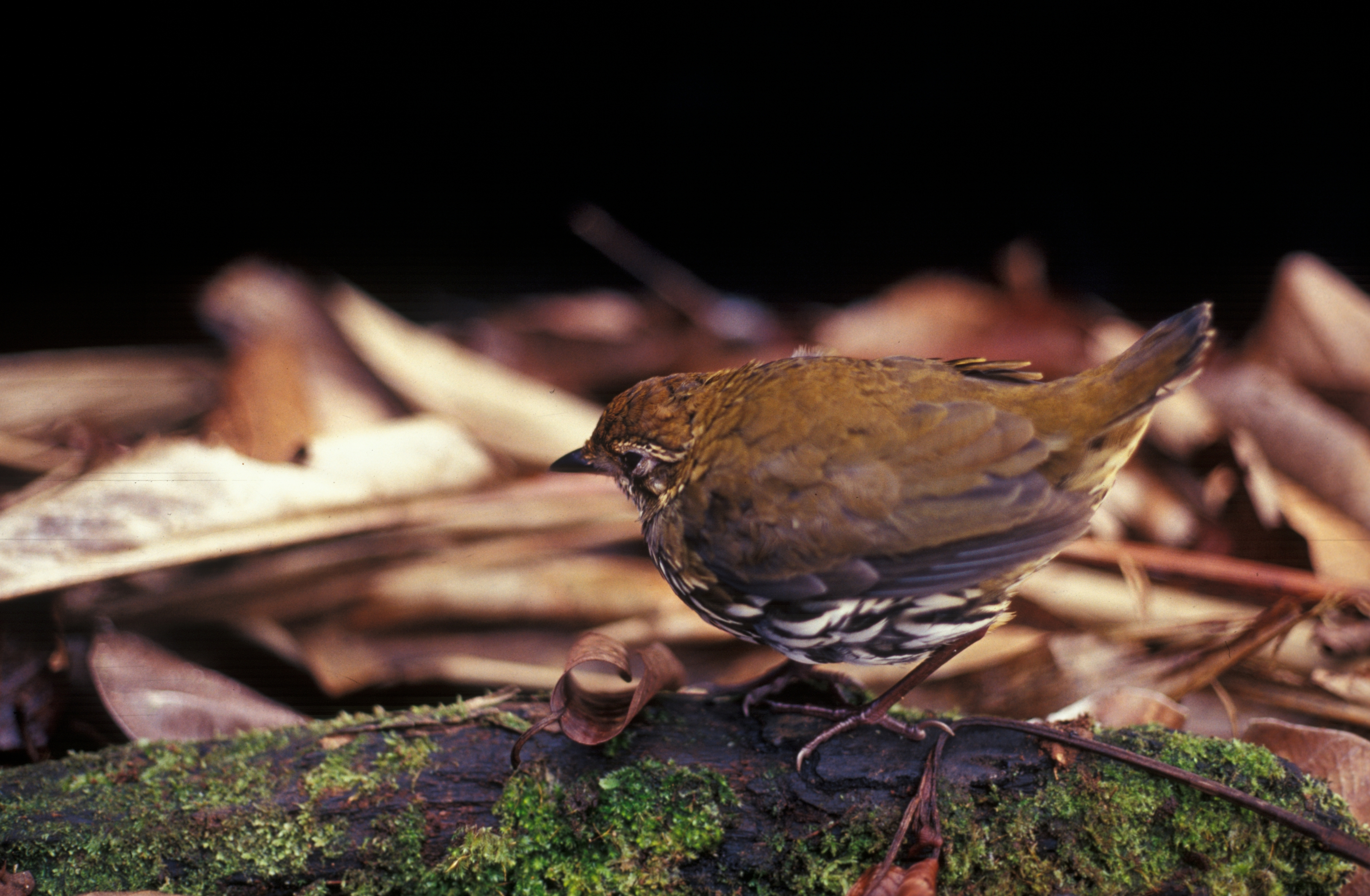
- Striated antthrush (Chamaeza nobilis)

Scientific classification
- Kingdom: Animalia
- Phylum: Chordata
- Class: Aves
- Order: Passeriformes
- Family: Formicariidae
- Genus: Chamaeza; Vigors, 1825

Type species
- Chamaeza meruloides Vigors, 1825

= Chamaeza =

Genus of birds

Chamaeza is a genus of South American birds in the family Formicariidae.

The genus was erected by the Irish zoologist Nicholas Aylward Vigors in 1825 with the cryptic antthrush (Chamaeza meruloides) as the type species.

== Species ==
The genus contains six species:

Image	Common name	Scientific name	Distribution
	Short-tailed antthrush	Chamaeza campanisona	Atlantic Forest in eastern Brazil, eastern Paraguay and northeastern Argentina
	Striated antthrush	Chamaeza nobilis	Bolivia, Brazil, Colombia, Ecuador, and Peru.
	Cryptic antthrush	Chamaeza meruloides	southeastern Brazil.
	Rufous-tailed antthrush	Chamaeza ruficauda	Atlantic Forest in southeastern Brazil and far northeastern Argentina (only Misiones Province)
	Schwartz's antthrush	Chamaeza turdina	Andes of Colombia and the Coastal Range in Venezuela.
	Barred antthrush	Chamaeza mollissima	Bolivia, Colombia, Ecuador and Peru
