= Black-capped antthrush =

Conservation status
- Least Concern (IUCN 3.1)

Scientific classification
- Kingdom: Animalia
- Phylum: Chordata
- Class: Aves
- Order: Passeriformes
- Family: Formicariidae
- Genus: Formicarius
- Species: F. nigricapillus

Binomial name
- Formicarius nigricapillus Ridgway, 1893
- Range

Species of bird

The black-capped antthrush (Formicarius nigricapillus) is a species of bird in the antthrush family Formicariidae. It is found at middle elevations in Costa Rica and northern Panama. It was formerly considered to be conspecific with the black-hooded antthrush (Formicarius destructus) and together they were known as the "black-headed antthrush".

== Taxonomy ==
The black-capped antthrush was formally described in 1893 by the American ornithologist Robert Ridgway as Formicarius nigricapillus based on a specimen collected at Buena Vista in the Alajuela Province of northern Costa Rica. The specific epithet combines the Latin niger meaning "black" with -capillus meaning "-capped". The species is monotypic: no subspecies are recognised.

== Description ==
The black-capped antthrush is about 18 cm (7.1 in) long; four individuals weighed 58 to 68 g (2.0 to 2.4 oz). The sexes have the same plumage. Adults of the nominate subspecies have a dark dusky brown to blackish crown. Their face and throat are black with a ring of bluish white bare skin around the eye. Their back, rump, and wings are dark chestnut-brown, their uppertail coverts dark rufescent brown, and their tail black. Their flight feathers have dusky inner edges and a wide cinnamon band at the base. Their upper breast is blackish gray, their belly gray, and their undertail coverts rufous. They have a brown iris, a black bill, and dusky brown legs and feet. Subspecies F. n. destructus has darker and less reddish-tinged upperparts than the nominate.

== Distribution and habitat ==
The black-capped antthrush is found on the Caribbean slope of Costa Rica and the Caribbean and Pacific slopes of Panama to western Guna Yala (San Blas). The species inhabits humid to wet primary forest and mature secondary forest. It favors ravines and other areas that have dense undergrowth. In elevation it occurs between 400 and 1,200 m (1,300 and 3,900 ft) in Costa Rica and between 400 and 1,500 m (1,300 and 4,900 ft) in Panama.

== Behavior ==
=== Feeding ===
The black-capped antthrush feeds primarily on a variety of arthropods, mostly insects but including spiders, and also tiny reptiles and amphibians. It is almost entirely terrestrial. It walks slowly and deliberately with its tail cocked like a little rail. It probes crevices and tangles and flicks aside leaf litter to find prey. It sometimes follows army ant swarms to capture prey fleeing the ants.

=== Breeding ===
The black-capped antthrush's breeding season varies geographically, from including April and May in Costa Rica and spanning at least December to March in Colombia. One nest was a shallow cup made of leaf petioles and dead leaves placed deep down in a hollow palm stump. The clutch size was two eggs. The incubation period, time to fledging, and details of parental care are not known.

=== Vocalization ===
The black-cappedd antthrush's song is "a trill of c. 10 notes per second at 1·5–2 kHz, first falling, then rising in pitch". Both sexes sing, commonly from the ground. Its call is "a short 'chweep' ".

== Status ==
The IUCN has assessed the black-capped antthrush as being of least concern. Its estimated population of at least 50,000 mature individuals is believed to be decreasing. No immediate threats have been identified. It is considered generally uncommon to locally fairly common, and specifically uncommon in Costa Rica. It occurs in several protected areas and is "able to survive in isolated and fairly small patches of forest".
