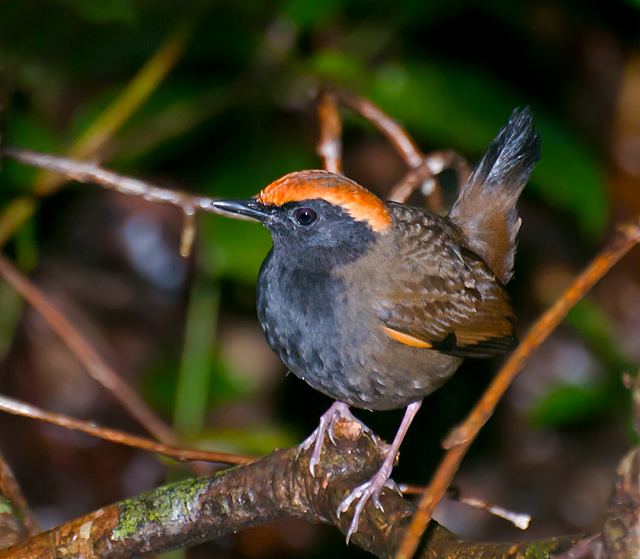
- In Vale do Ribeira, Registro, São Paulo, Brazil

Conservation status
- Least Concern (IUCN 3.1)

Scientific classification
- Kingdom: Animalia
- Phylum: Chordata
- Class: Aves
- Order: Passeriformes
- Family: Formicariidae
- Genus: Formicarius
- Species: F. colma

Binomial name
- Formicarius colma Boddaert, 1783
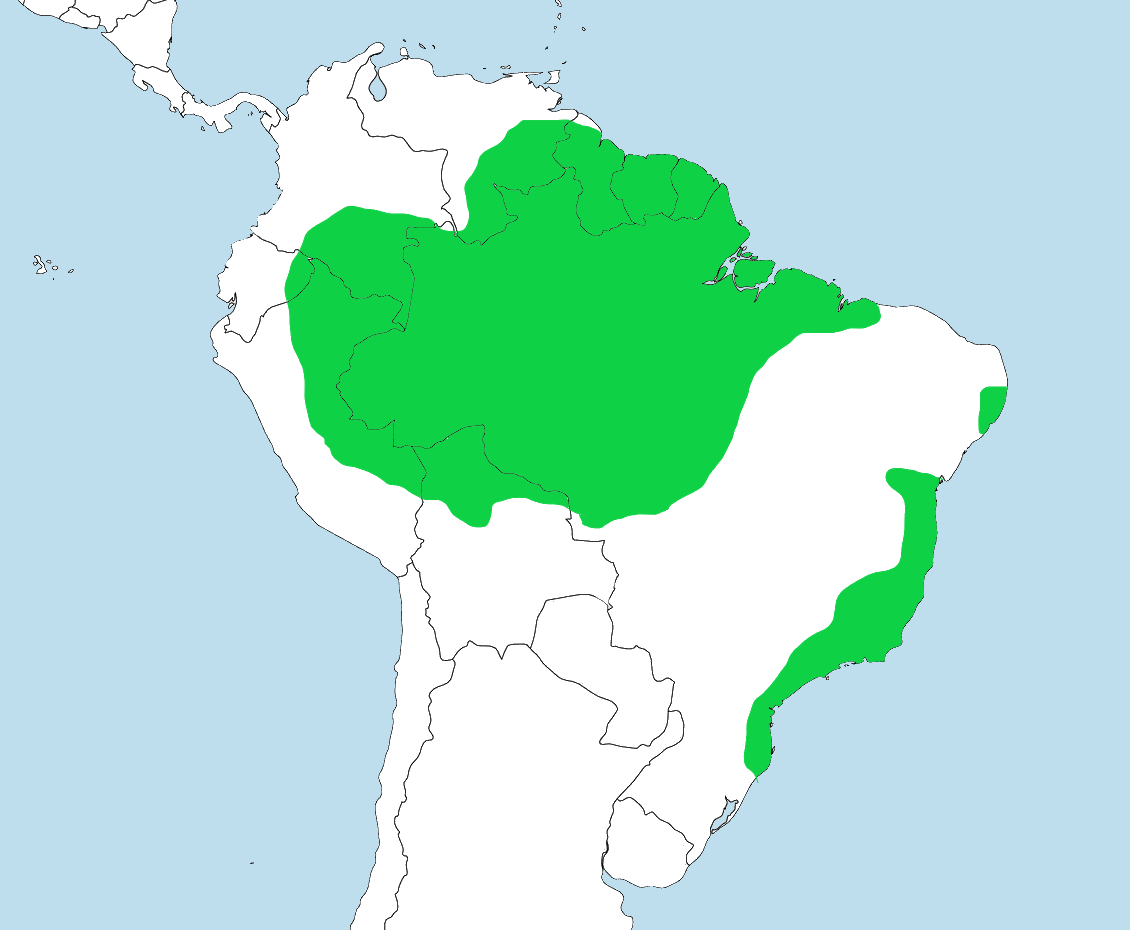

= Rufous-capped antthrush =

Species of bird

The rufous-capped antthrush (Formicarius colma) is a small species of bird in the family Formicariidae located in the order Passeriformes. It is considered to be uncommon but widespread, found in Bolivia, Brazil, Colombia, Ecuador, French Guiana, Guyana, Peru, Suriname, and Venezuela. The rufous-capped antthrush is typically found inhabiting the shady floor of tall, humid forests on solid ground, and is occasionally spotted in transitional forests (várzea) and savanna forests (Suriname).

== Taxonomy and systematics ==
The rufous-capped antthrush was first described by the French polymath Georges-Louis Leclerc, Comte de Buffon in his 1779 journal Histoire Naturelle des Oiseaux (Natural History, General and Particular, with a Description of the King's Cabinet) from a specimen collected in Cayenne, French Guiana and was further engraved by François-Nicolas Martinet in the Planches Enluminées D'Histoire Naturelle (Illuminated Planks of Natural History) which was produced under the supervision of Edme-Louis Daubenton to accompany Buffon's text. Neither Buffon's description nor Martinet's drawing included a scientific name, however, Dutch naturalist Pieter Boddaert coined the binomial name Formicarius colma (Formicarius being Latin for "of the ant") in his 1783 catalogue the Planches Enluminées, with the specific epithet colma forged by Buffon, most likely being a contraction of "collier" (necklace) and "marque" (mark).

There are four recognized subspecies of Formicarius:

- F. c. colma (Boddaert, 1783) – found in east Colombia, south Venezuela, the Guianas and north Brazil (north of the Amazon);
- F. c. nigrifrons (Gould, 1855) – found in east Ecuador, east Peru, north Bolivia and southwest Amazonian Brazil;
- F. c. amazonicus (Hellmayr, 1902) – found in central Brazil;
- F. c. ruficeps (von Spix, 1824) – found in east, southeast and south Brazil.

The exact phylogeny of the rufous-capped antthrush is poorly understood, however, an estimated phylogeny was constructed in 1983 by Sibley and Ahlquist by comparing sixteen tracer-species through DNA–DNA hybridization.

== Description ==
The Formicarius colma is generally a small bird, averaging around 18 cm with males weighing between 38 and 49 grams and females between 41 and 49 grams. Males are marked by a black forehead, rufous-colored (red-brown) crown and nape, with the crown including a variable amount of black feathers. Its back, rump, and wings are olive-brown color with a dusky brown tail and black on the neck, throat, and sides of the head. The upper breast is a dark black that merges into a dark gray on the lower breast while the belly and flanks are a paler gray with (occasionally) a brown wash. Underwing coverts are marked by a mix of black and cinnamon with the inner webs of remiges being dusky with a broad cinnamon bar across the base. Facial features include a brown iris and black bill while the tarsus vary from light gray-brown to a purplish-gray. The female is largely the same as the male, being marked with a white throat rather than the black seen in males. The four subspecies differ slightly from each other; the nigrifrons largely resemble colma but with more black on the head, the amazonicus resemble the nigrifrons but smaller with a deeper rufous head, short tail, and browner upperparts, and the ruficeps having an extensively rufous head. Juvenile rufous-capped antthrushes are marked by a white throat (like the female) and black spotting. The song of the rufous-capped antthrush is generally a 4 to 6 second long, fast, even-paced trill of about 14 notes per second. This song is between 2.2 and 3kHz, with this frequency being speculated as optimal for communication in thick, humid underbrush. The call of the rufous-capped antthrush is described as a single, clear "psee-eh" or "pier," while the song is described as a "re-e-e-e-e-e-e-e-e-e-e-e-e-e-ee-ee-ee-ee-ee".

== Distribution and habitat ==
The F. colma is found in east Colombia (south of Vaupés), south and east Venezuela, the Guianas, and in Brazil north of the Amazon while the subspecies F. nigrifrons are found east of Ecuador, east of Peru, north of Bolivia (south to La Paz), and south of the Amazon. F. amazonicus is found in Brazil south of the Amazon, from east Madeira to north Maranhão, and south of Ji-Paranã and Mato Grosso. F. ruficeps is found on the coastal east and southeast of Brazil from Pernambuco to Rio Grande do Sul. The rufous-capped antthrush are widespread, predominately preferring the cooler, shady floor of terra firme forests, although they can occasionally be spotted inhabiting traditional forests and savanna forests. While they generally occupy the lowlands to 500m and locally to 1100m, interspecies aggression between the rufous-capped antthrush and F. analis has been observed to induce altitudinal displacement, with F. colma fleeing to higher and drier ravines and ridges while the F. analis occupy the lower lands. Additionally, in Manu, the black-faced antthrush, being both larger and more population-dense, dominate over the rufous-capped antthrush. While the two species frequently overlap due to F. colma's large distribution, the song of the F. colma has been reported to induce an aggressive response from the black-faced antthrush while the song of the black-faced antthrush causes recession of the rufous-capped antthrush, indicating further interspecies aggression. Other than interspecies aggression, the driving factor controlling the rufous-capped antthrush's distribution is poorly understood, as they are believed to be a sedentary species.

== Behavior and ecology ==
=== Breeding ===
Very few rufous-capped antthrush nests have been found. Those found are composed of a crude arrangement of roots and leaves placed into a cavity. The clutch size of Formicarius typically consists two white, ovoid eggs that become stained and blotched soon after laying. Two eggs from one clutch were measured to be 28.6-32.3 x 21.8-24 mm. Rufous-capped antthrush hatchlings emerge altricial with long, spreading gray down. Juveniles are typically hatched around October (Brazil), however, in Colombia they emerge in May. In Brazil, males with enlarged testes are also seen in October while they are observed in April near Venezuela. Juveniles in Peru were flushed out of the nest in November.

=== Food and feeding ===
The diet of a rufous-capped antthrush consists of ants (Attinae) and grasshoppers (Locustidae and Tettigoniidae). They hunt by walking slowly and tactfully on the forest floor, picking prey off of leaf litter before flicking it away with their beaks. They usually hunt alone but have been observed hunting near each other in small groups. They are frequently seen alone or in small groups on the periphery of ant swarms. Additionally, Formicarius have also been known to occasionally eat snakes.

=== Threats and survival ===
Currently, the largest threat to the rufous-capped antthrush is loss of habitat through mining and deforestation. While F. colma is currently not globally threatened, these activities have been shown to drive F. colma and other Formicariidae from their habitats. Because F. colma are sedentary, this makes it difficult for them to escape.

=== Relationship to humans ===
Rufous-capped antthrushes are rarely seen, but rather heard through their loud songs and calls. The meat of Formicariidae is reportedly flavorous, however, their low population densities, secretive nature, and small size make them an unlikely candidate for hunting by native tribes, who prefer the black-capped antthrush more commonly seen around human settlements.

=== Status ===
According to the IUCN Red List of Threatened Species, rufous-capped antthrushes are considered of least concern and are not globally threatened. They are generally rated as uncommon to fairly common based on location and inhabit many protected zones. F. colma are fairly common in Ecuador, Peru, Colombia, Venezuela, and in the Guianas and rare in the Rio Grande do Sul.
