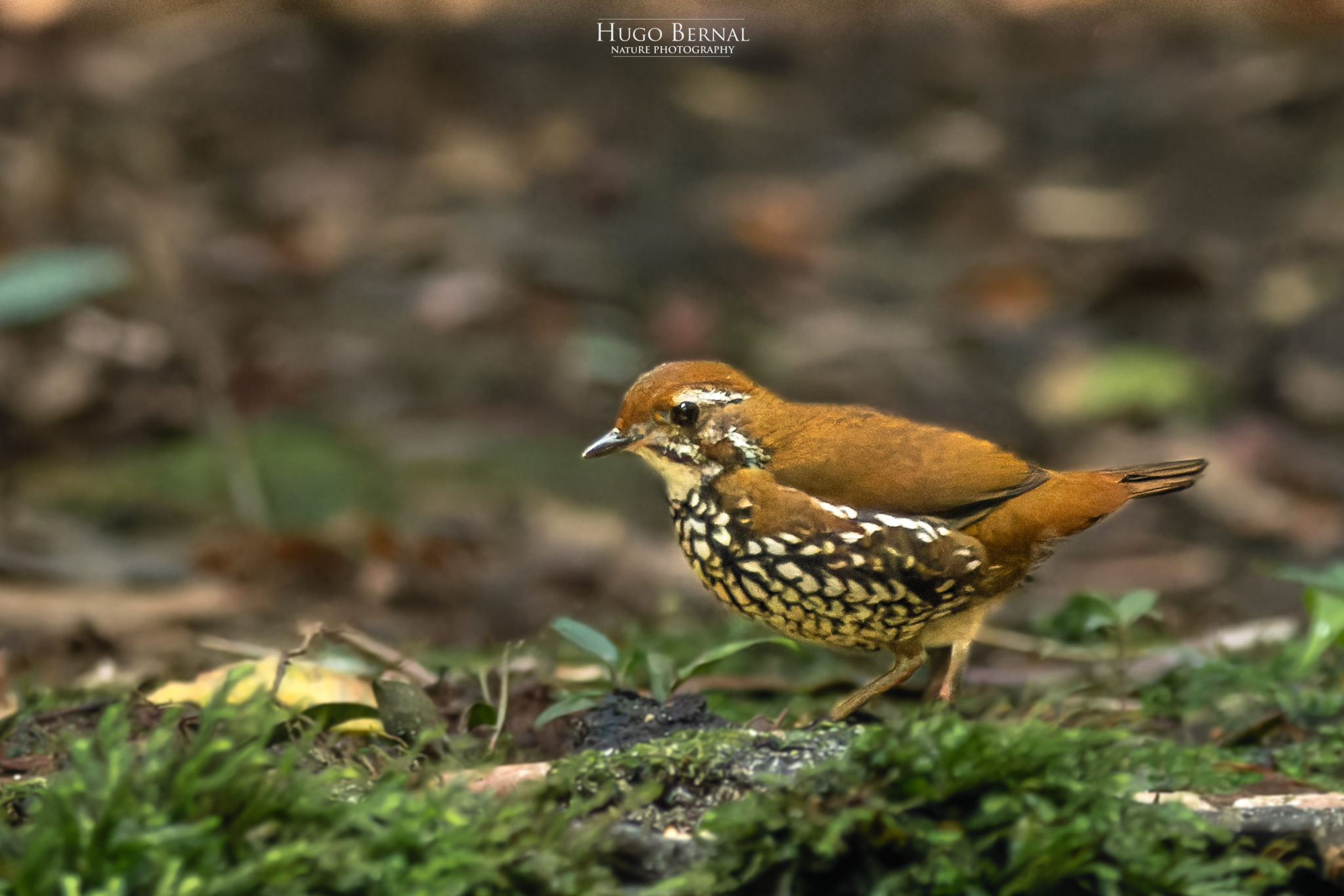

Conservation status
- Least Concern (IUCN 3.1)

Scientific classification
- Kingdom: Animalia
- Phylum: Chordata
- Class: Aves
- Order: Passeriformes
- Family: Formicariidae
- Genus: Chamaeza
- Species: C. turdina

Binomial name
- Chamaeza turdina Cabanis & Heine, 1860

= Schwartz's antthrush =

Species of bird

Schwartz's antthrush (Chamaeza turdina), also known as the scalloped antthrush, is a species of bird in the family Formicariidae. It is found in Colombia and Venezuela.

== Taxonomy and systematics ==
Schwartz's antthrush was long treated as a subspecies of the rufous-tailed antthrush (C. ruficauda). Their differences were not fully recognized until 1992 when their songs were analyzed in detail.

Schwartz's antthrush has two subspecies, the nominate C. t. turdina (Cabanis & Heine, 1860) and C. t. chionogaster (Hellmayr, 1906).

The species' English name honors ornithologist Paul A. Schwartz, who was the first to realize how strikingly different its song sounds compared to that of the rufous-tailed antthrush.

== Description ==
Schwartz's antthrush is 19 to 19.5 cm (7.5 to 7.7 in) long. The sexes are alike. Adults of the nominate subspecies have a slightly rufescent olive-brown crown. They have white lores, a short white streak through their eye, and a whitish streak on the side of their neck. Their upperparts and wings are mostly medium olive-brown with a slightly more rufescent rump. Their tail is dusky brown. Their throat is white with small blackish spots that look like a stripe. Their breast and belly are white with a heavy blackish scallop pattern. Their flanks have an olive-brown wash and their crissum has thin black bars. Their iris is reddish brown, their bill dusky with a reddish brown base to the mandible, and their legs and feet dusky brown. Subspecies C. t. chionogaster has paler underparts than the nominate with heavier scallops on their lower throat and breast; their tail feathers have thin pale buff tips.

== Distribution and habitat ==
Schwartz's antthrush has a highly disjunct distribution. The nominate subspecies is found locally along all three of Colombia's Andean ranges, principally in the watersheds of the Cauca and Magdalena rivers. A separate population in the Serranía de los Yariguíes is thought to be this subspecies. C. t. chionogaster is found in northern Venezuela, in the Aroa Mountains and in the Coastal Range from Carabobo to northern Miranda. The species inhabits the interior and edges of humid to wet montane forest. It favors areas with much moss and tangled understory vegetation. In Colombia it occurs between 1,600 and 2,800 m (5,200 and 9,200 ft) and in Venezuela between 1,500 and 2,100 m (4,900 and 6,900 ft) with a few sight records as low as 1,100 m (3,600 ft).

== Behavior ==
=== Movement ===
Schwartz's antthrush is believed to be a year-round resident throughout its range.

=== Feeding ===
The diet and foraging behavior of Schwartz's antthrush are not known in detail, though it probably feeds on insects and spiders. It is almost entirely terrestrial. It slowly walks and runs on the forest floor.

=== Breeding ===
The breeding season of Schwartz's antthrush varies geographically but is overall between May and August. Nothing else is known about the species' breeding biology.

=== Vocalization ===
In Venezuela, Schwartz's antthrush has two songs. One is "a remarkably long series of whistled cu notes...without pause, the series gaining slightly in volume, tempo, and pitch as it goes along". The other is "a loud abrupt and descending series of cuu or cuk notes that slow and wind down into a laughlike series of notes that stop abruptly or gradually merge into [the other song]". After either song it "sometimes gives a short series of chuckling notes at [the] end, e.g. cu-cu-cu, towak, wak, wak, wak". It sings similar songs in Colombia. The species' calls include "a short 'quick' " and "a loud, abrupt ble'blink!".

== Status ==
The IUCN has assessed Swartz's antthrush as being of Least Concern. It has a small range; its population size is not known and is believed to be stable. No immediate threats have been identified. It is considered fairly common in all parts of its range and occurs in several protected areas in both countries.
