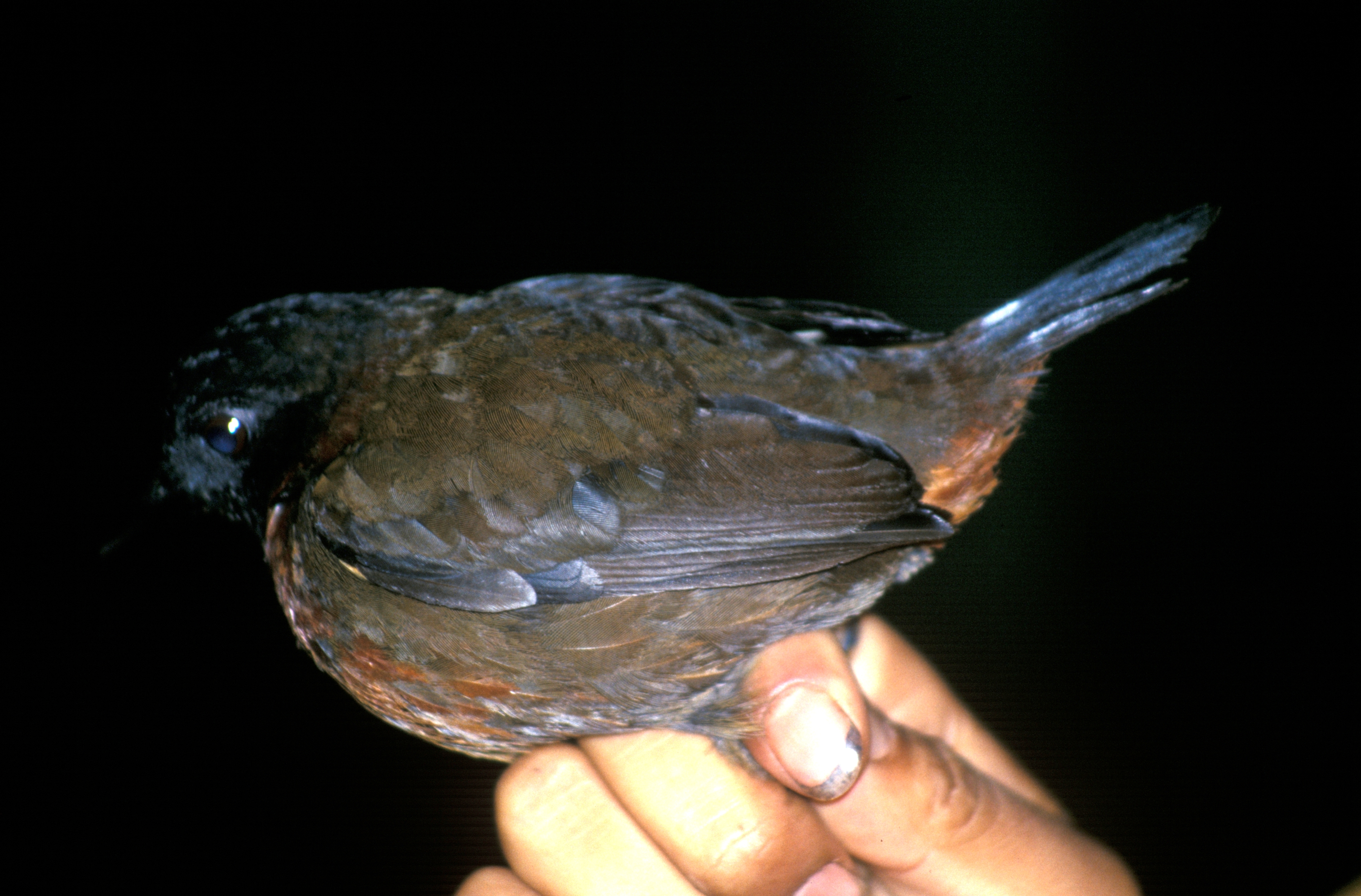
- From Cordillera del Cóndor, Ecuador

Conservation status
- Least Concern (IUCN 3.1)

Scientific classification
- Kingdom: Animalia
- Phylum: Chordata
- Class: Aves
- Order: Passeriformes
- Family: Formicariidae
- Genus: Formicarius
- Species: F. rufipectus

Binomial name
- Formicarius rufipectus Salvin, 1866
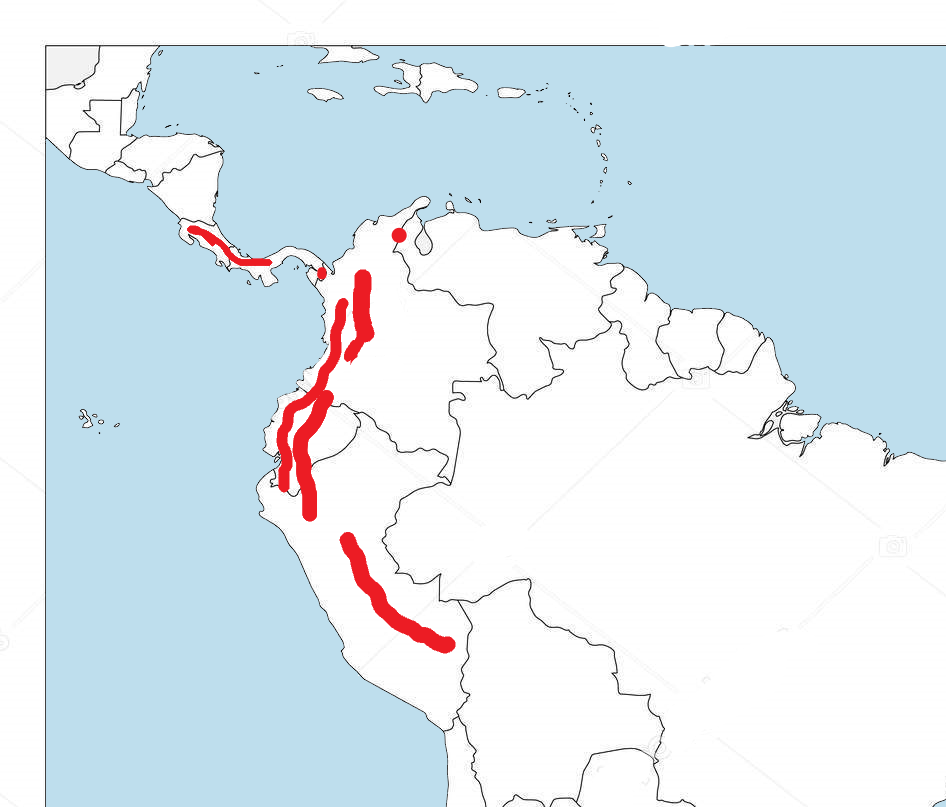

= Rufous-breasted antthrush =

Species of bird

The rufous-breasted antthrush (Formicarius rufipectus) is a species of bird in the family Formicariidae. It is found in Colombia, Costa Rica, Ecuador, Panama, Peru, and Venezuela.

== Taxonomy and systematics ==
The rufous-breasted antthrush has these four subspecies:

- F. r. rufipectus Salvin, 1866
- F. r. carrikeri Chapman, 1912
- F. r. lasallei Aveledo & Ginés, 1952
- F. r. thoracicus Taczanowski & Berlepsch, 1885

== Description ==
The rufous-breasted antthrush is 18 to 19 cm (7.1 to 7.5 in) long. Males weigh 70 to 78 g (2.5 to 2.8 oz) and females 65 to 82 g (2.3 to 2.9 oz). The sexes have the same plumage. Adults of the nominate subspecies F. r. rufipectus have a dark chestnut crown, nape, and sides of their neck. Their face and throat are blackish with a bluish white ring of bare skin around their eye. Their back and wings are dark brown, their rump and uppertail coverts dark rufescent brown, and their tail blackish. Their flight feathers have dusky inner edges and a wide cinnamon band at the base. Their breast is rufous-chestnut, their belly pale rufous, their flanks olive-brown, and their vent area dark chestnut. They have a brown or reddish brown iris, a black bill, and dusky brown or dark gray legs and feet. Subspecies F. r. carrikeri has a dusky forecrown and more slaty upperparts and paler underparts than the nominate. F. r. lasallei has a black crown and less red on the head than the nominate. F. r. thoracicus has a black crown, less red on the head than lasallei, and a more olive (less rufous) belly than the nominate.

== Distribution and habitat ==
The rufous-breasted antthrush has a disjunct distribution. The subspecies are found thus:

- F. r. rufipectus: Caribbean slope of Costa Rica from southern Guanacaste Province south on the Caribbean and Pacific slopes of Panama to Veraguas Province; separately in eastern Panama's Darién Province
- F. r. carrikeri: Colombia's Western and Central Andes and south through western Ecuador as far as El Oro and western Loja provinces
- F. r. lasallei: Venezuela, separately in the Sierra de Perijá in the northwest and in further south in far western Táchira
- F. r. thoracicus: eastern Ecuador south to Peru's Department of Cuzco

The rufous-breasted antthrush inhabits humid to wet primary forest and mature secondary forest. It favors ravines, regrown landslide scars, steep slopes, and other areas that have dense undergrowth. In elevation it occurs between 800 and 1,800 m (2,600 and 5,900 ft) in Costa Rica, between 1,200 and 2,400 m (3,900 and 7,900 ft) in Colombia, mostly between 1,100 and 2,000 m (3,600 and 6,600 ft) in Ecuador, between 1,100 and 1,850 m (3,600 and 6,100 ft) in Peru, and between 1,100 and 2,200 m (3,600 and 7,200 ft) in Venezuela.

== Behavior ==
=== Movement ===
The rufous-breasted antthrush is a year-round resident throughout its range.

=== Feeding ===
The rufous-breasted antthrush's diet and foraging behavior are not known. It is almost entirely terrestrial. It walks slowly and deliberately with its tail cocked like a little rail. It has been seen once at an army ant swarm but not seen at many others in its habitat.

=== Breeding ===
The rufous-breasted antthrush's breeding season has not been detailed but includes June in Colombia and October in Ecuador. Nothing else is known about the species' breeding biology.

=== Vocalization ===
The rufous-breasted antthrush's song varies somewhat among the subspecies. It is "two clear whistles at 1·8–2 kHz, 'toot-toot', second note sometimes slightly higher-pitched in rufipectus, usually so in carrikeri. The species' call is "a double-noted chirp" written by one author as "TU'TCHOOP".

== Status ==
The IUCN has assessed the rufous-breasted antthrush as being of Least Concern. It has a large range; its estimated population of at least 500,000 mature individuals is believed to be decreasing. No immediate threats have been identified. It is considered very local throughout its range and fairly common in Costa Rica, Colombia, and Venezuela and rare to uncommon in Peru. It occurs in several protected areas.
