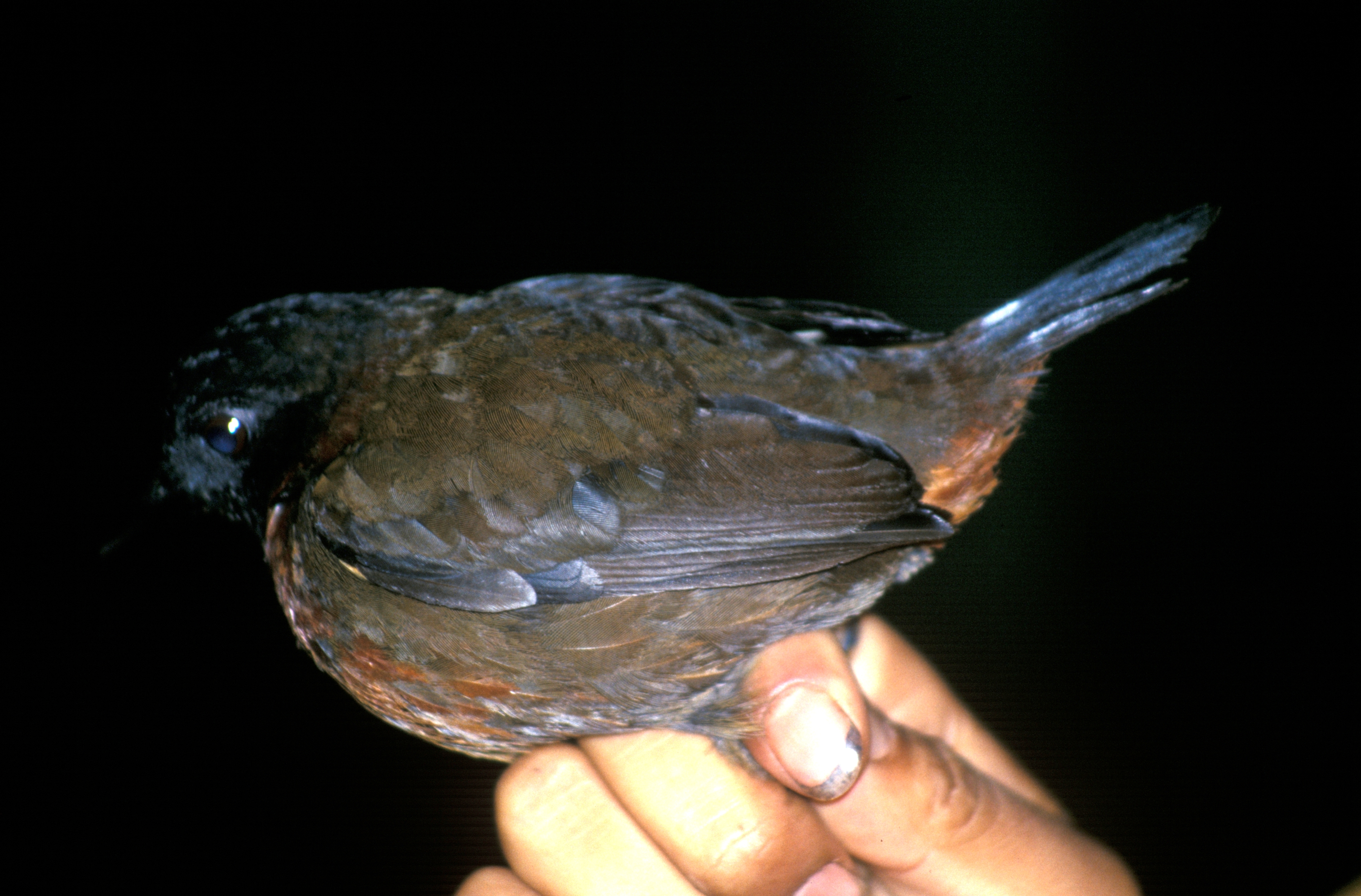
- Rufous-breasted antthrush (Formicarius rufipectus)

Scientific classification
- Kingdom: Animalia
- Phylum: Chordata
- Class: Aves
- Order: Passeriformes
- Family: Formicariidae
- Genus: Formicarius; Boddaert, 1783

Type species
- Formicarius cayanensis Boddaert, 1783

Species
- F. colma; F. nigricapillus; F. analis; F. moniliger; F. rufifrons; F. rufipectus

= Formicarius (bird) =

Genus of birds

Formicarius is a genus of passerine birds in the family Formicariidae. These birds are all found in the tropical New World, from southern Mexico south to Central America and northern South America. All are named as antthrushes, and are insectivorous forest birds. They are largely terrestrial, feeding mainly on the ground on ants and other insects.

== Taxonomy ==
The genus Formicarius was introduced by the Dutch naturalist Pieter Boddaert in 1783 in his catalogue of the ten volumes of hand-coloured plates that had been engraved by François-Nicolas Martinet. The plates were produced to accompany Georges-Louis Leclerc, Comte de Buffon's Histoire Naturelle des Oiseaux. The type species was subsequently designated as the rufous-capped antthrush (Formicarius colma) by the English zoologist George Robert Gray in 1840. The generic name Formicarius is Latin meaning "of the ant".

The following cladogram shows the phylogenetic relationships between the species. It is based on a large molecular phylogenetic study of the suboscines by Michael Harvey and collaborators that was published in 2020. The genus contains seven species.

- Formicarius
  - Rufous-fronted antthrush (Formicarius rufifrons)
  - - Rufous-capped antthrush (Formicarius colma)
    - - Rufous-breasted antthrush (Formicarius rufipectus)
      - - Mayan antthrush (Formicarius moniliger)
        - - Black-capped antthrush (Formicarius nigricapillus)
          - Black-faced antthrush (Formicarius analis)

Image	Common name	Scientific name	Distribution
	Rufous-capped antthrush	Formicarius colma	Bolivia, Brazil, Colombia, Ecuador, French Guiana, Guyana, Peru, Suriname, and Venezuela.
	Black-faced antthrush	Formicarius analis	from Honduras through Central America to Colombia, Venezuela, Trinidad and Brazil
	Mayan antthrush (formerly considered conspecific with the black-faced antthrush)	Formicarius moniliger	southern Mexico through northwestern Honduras.
	Rufous-fronted antthrush	Formicarius rufifrons	southeastern Peru, northwestern Bolivia (Pando), and far southwestern Brazil
	Black-capped antthrush	Formicarius nigricapillus	Caribbean slope of Costa Rica and both slopes of Panama
	Black-hooded antthrush	Formicarius destructus	Pacific slope of Colombia, south to northwestern Ecuador I
	Rufous-breasted antthrush	Formicarius rufipectus	Colombia, Costa Rica, Ecuador, Panama, Peru, and Venezuela.
