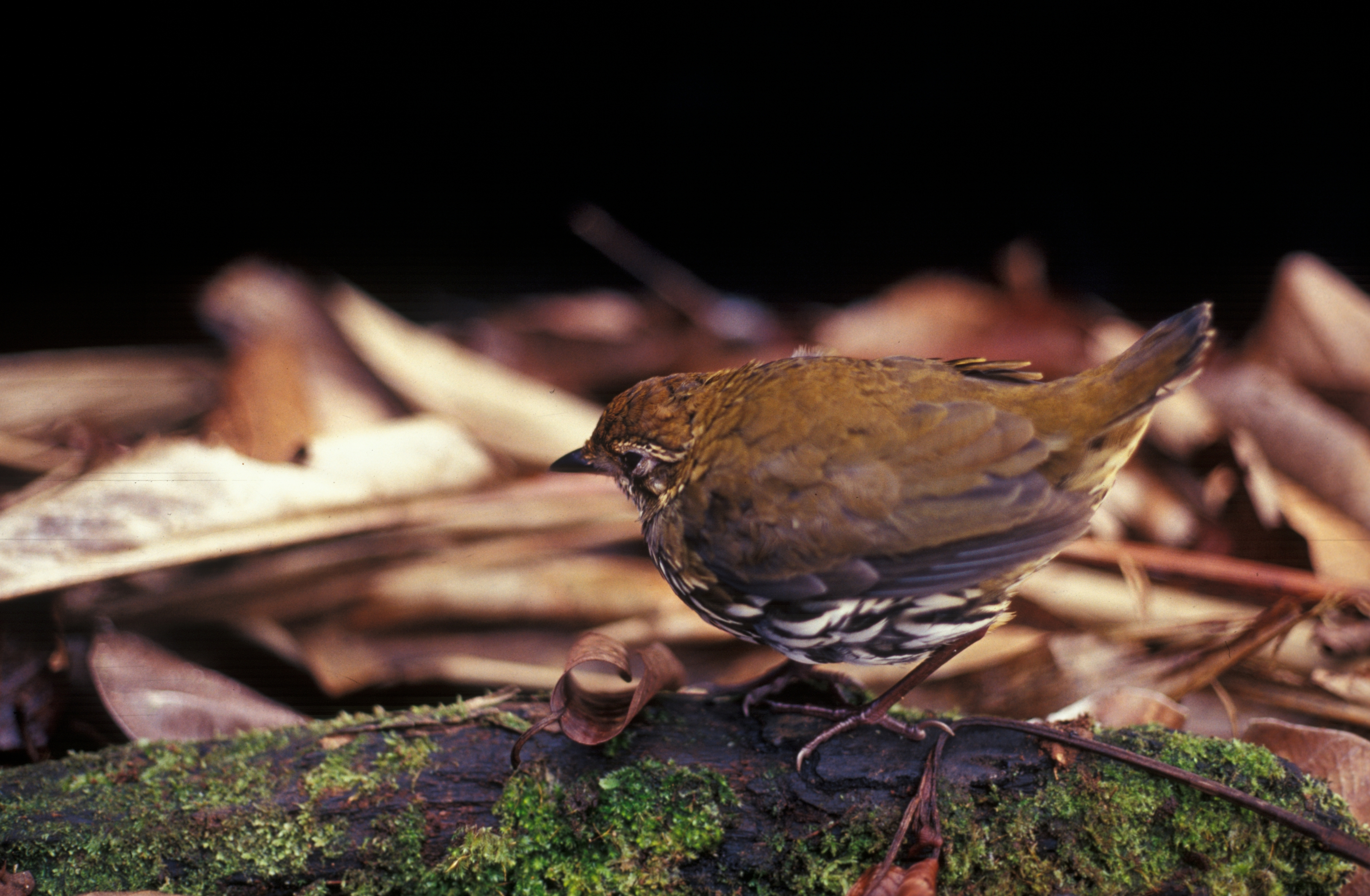

Conservation status
- Least Concern (IUCN 3.1)

Scientific classification
- Kingdom: Animalia
- Phylum: Chordata
- Class: Aves
- Order: Passeriformes
- Family: Formicariidae
- Genus: Chamaeza
- Species: C. nobilis

Binomial name
- Chamaeza nobilis Gould, 1855

= Striated antthrush =

Species of bird

The striated antthrush (Chamaeza nobilis), sometimes called the noble antthrush, is a species of bird in the family Formicariidae. It is found in Bolivia, Brazil, Colombia, Ecuador, and Peru.

== Taxonomy and systematics ==
The striated antthrush was described by the English ornithologist and bird artist John Gould in 1855 and given its current binomial name Chamaeza nobilis.

The striated antthrush has three subspecies, the nominate C. n. nobilis (Gould, 1855), C. n. rubida (Zimmer, JT, 1932), and C. n. fulvipectus (Todd, 1927). Several authors have suggested that C. n. fulvipectus should be treated as a separate species.

== Description ==
The striated antthrush is 22 to 23 cm (8.7 to 9.1 in) long and weighs about 120 to 150 g (4.2 to 5.3 oz). The sexes are alike. Adults of the nominate subspecies have a dark rufescent brown crown. They have white or buff lores and a white streak behind their eye on an otherwise rufescent brown face. They have a white spot on the side of their neck. Their back, rump, and wings are dark rufescent brown to brown. Their tail is dark olive-brown with a black band near the end and thin white tips on the feathers. Their throat is white. Their underparts are mostly white with a black scalloped effect on their breast and flanks, Their crissum is white with a buff wash and some light black markings. Their iris is dark brown, their bill black with a pinkish brown base to the mandible, and their legs and feet dark gray. Subspecies C. n. rubida has a smaller white patch on its neck than the nominate. C. n. fulvipectus has a rich yellow-ochre breast rather than white.

== Distribution and habitat ==
The striated antthrush is a bird of the central and western Amazon Basin. The nominate subspecies is found south of the Amazon River in eastern Peru, extreme northwestern Bolivia, and west-central Brazil east to the Purus River and perhaps beyond to the Madeira River. Subspecies C. n. rubida is found south of the Amazon from southeastern Colombia south through eastern Ecuador into northeastern Peru and east just into western Brazil. C. n. fulvipectus is found south of the Amazon between the Tapajós and Xingu rivers. Populations further west to the Madeira and south into northern Rondônia are probably also this subspecies.

The striated antthrush primarily inhabits the floor of terra firme forest with sparse undergrowth. In elevation it reaches 500 m (1,600 ft) in Colombia and Ecuador, 450 m (1,480 ft) in Peru, and possibly 1,000 m (3,300 ft) in Bolivia.

== Behavior ==
=== Movement ===
The striated antthrush is believed to be a year-round resident throughout its range.

=== Feeding ===
The striated antthrush's diet and foraging behavior are not known. It is almost entirely terrestrial; it walks slowly and deliberately on the forest floor.

=== Breeding ===
The striated antthrush's breeding season is not fully known but includes June in Colombia. The one known nest was in a deep cavity in a live tree; it had no lining and contained one nestling. Nothing else is known about the species' breeding biology.

=== Vocalization ===
The song of the nominate subspecies and C. n. rubida is "a long, accelerating, descending series of hollow, hooting whistles that abruptly becomes a much slower-paced descending series of rising hoots...poop poop-pu-pu-pu'pu'pu'pu'pupupupupupupupupupu-WOOP WOOP woop woop woop". That of C. n. fulvipectus is much slower and has many fewer notes than the others' song. The three subspecies appear to have the same calls, a series of gurgles and "a fairly clear 'quick' ".

== Status ==
The IUCN has assessed the striated antthrush as being of Least Concern. It has a very large range; its population size is not known and is believed to be stable. No immediate threats have been identified. It is considered generally uncommon though fairly common in Colombia and Ecuador and rare in Peru. It is known from several protect areas.
