= Barred antthrush =

Conservation status
- Least Concern (IUCN 3.1)

Scientific classification
- Kingdom: Animalia
- Phylum: Chordata
- Class: Aves
- Order: Passeriformes
- Family: Formicariidae
- Genus: Chamaeza
- Species: C. mollissima

Binomial name
- Chamaeza mollissima Sclater, PL, 1855

Species of bird

The barred antthrush (Chamaeza mollissima) is a species of bird in the family Formicariidae. It is found in Bolivia, Colombia, Ecuador and Peru.

== Taxonomy and systematics ==
The barred antthrush has two subspecies, the nominate C. m. mollissima (Sclater, PL, 1855) and C. m. yungae (Carriker, 1935).

== Description ==
The rufous-tailed antthrush is 19 to 20.5 cm (7.5 to 8.1 in) long and weighs about 69 to 80 g (2.4 to 2.8 oz). The sexes are alike. Adults have a chestnut to dark brown crown. They have whitish lores, a white streak with black bars behind their eye, a chestnut streak below the eye, and black and white barred ear coverts. Their upperparts, wings, and tail are mostly chestnut to dark brown with a slightly more rufescent rump and uppertail coverts. Their throat has narrow black and white bars. Their underparts are mostly dark brown to black with narrow white or buff bars and brown lower flanks. Their iris is dark brown, their bill black with a dark brown base to the mandible, and their legs and feet gray-brown. Subspecies C. m. yungae is darker than the nominate, with broken rather than uniform pale bars on their underparts that give a somewhat spotted look.

== Distribution and habitat ==
The barred antthrush has a disjunct distribution. The nominate subspecies is found in Colombia's Cauca and Magdalena river valleys and on the east slope of the Andes from Nariño Department in Colombia's southwest south through eastern Ecuador into northern Peru to (or possibly just beyond) the Marañón River. Subspecies C. m. yungae is found from southwestern Ucayali Department in Peru south into Bolivia as far as Cochabamba Department. The species inhabits the floor of humid to wet primary montane forest and cloudforest with dense undergrowth and much moss and lichen on fallen trees. In elevation it ranges between 1,500 and 3,200 m (4,900 and 10,500 ft) in Colombia, mostly between 2,000 and 2,600 m (6,600 and 8,500 ft) in Ecuador, and 1,800 and 3,100 m (5,900 and 10,200 ft) in Peru.

== Behavior ==
=== Movement ===
The barred antthrush is believed to be a year-round resident throughout its range.

=== Feeding ===
The barred antthrush's diet and foraging behavior are not known in detail, but one specimen's stomach held small seeds. It is almost entirely terrestrial; it pumps its tail while it walks and runs on the forest floor. Though it is seldom seen, when encountered it is as single birds or pairs.

=== Breeding ===
The barred antthrush's breeding season is not known but includes November in Peru. Nothing else is known about the species' breeding biology.

=== Vocalization ===
The barred antthrush's song is "a series of similar notes at even pace of 6–7 per second, increasing steadily in volume and in pitch...increasing variably throughout song or through first half and then levelling, sometimes pace slowing and pitch slightly lowering over final few seconds" and can last up to 30 seconds. It has been written as "pupupupupupupupupupupupupupuPUPUPUPUPU'PU'PU'PU' PU". It sings from the ground or a very low perch. Its calls include a "rapid 'weeweewit' " and a "squeaky 'wickwick' ".

== Status ==
The IUCN has assessed the barred antthrush as being of Least Concern. Its population size is not known and is believed to be stable. No immediate threats have been identified. It is considered local throughout its range and uncommon in Colombia, rare in Ecuador, and rare to uncommon in Peru. It occurs in several protected areas.
