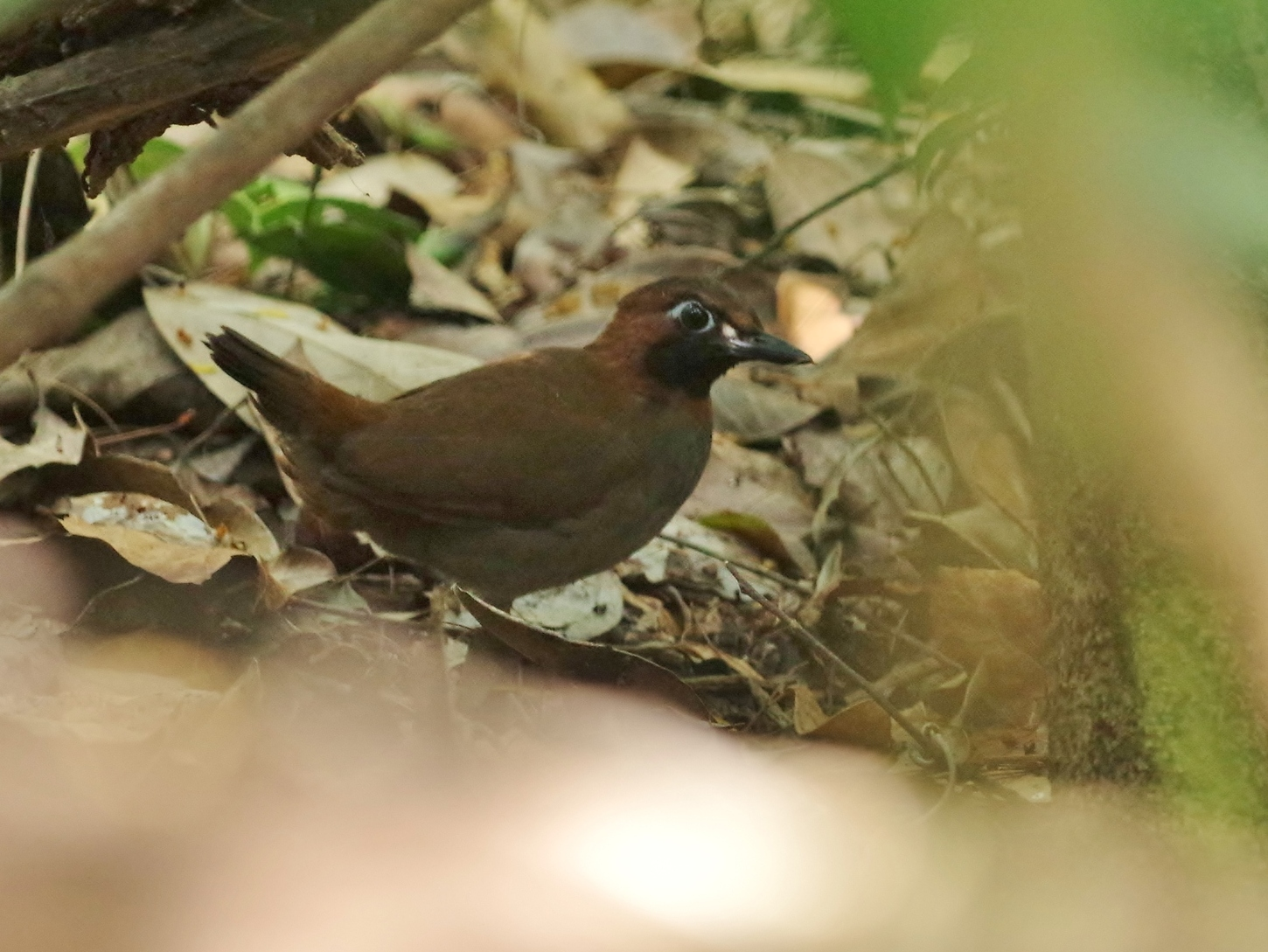

Conservation status
- Least Concern (IUCN 3.1)

Scientific classification
- Kingdom: Animalia
- Phylum: Chordata
- Class: Aves
- Order: Passeriformes
- Family: Formicariidae
- Genus: Formicarius
- Species: F. moniliger

Binomial name
- Formicarius moniliger PL Sclater, 1857
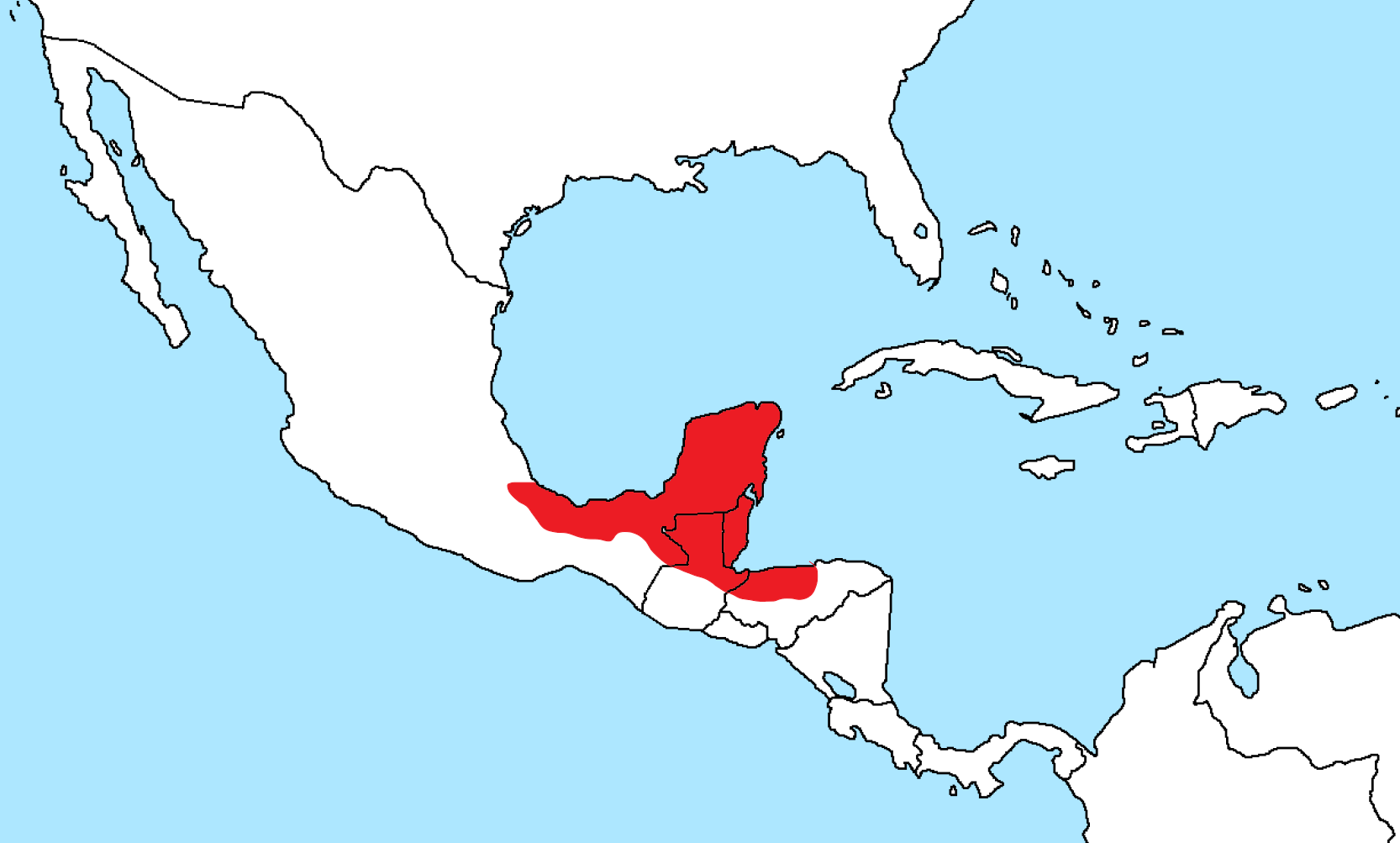

= Mayan antthrush =

Species of bird

The Mayan antthrush (Formicarius moniliger) is a species of bird in the family Formicariidae. It is found in Belize, Guatemala, Honduras, and Mexico.

== Taxonomy and systematics ==
The Mayan antthrush was formally described as a species by the English ornithologist Philip Slater in 1857. It was later treated by many ornithologists as a subspecies of the black-faced antthrush (Formicarius analis), though some retained it as a species due to significant differences in the two taxa's vocalizations. By 2021 major taxonomic systems had adopted the split.

The Mayan antthrush has three subspecies, the nominate F. m. moniliger (Sclater, PL, 1857), F. m. pallidus (Lawrence, 1882), and F. m. intermedius (Ridgway, 1908).

== Description ==
The Mayan antthrush is 15 to 19 cm (5.9 to 7.5 in) long and weighs about 56 to 64 g (2.0 to 2.3 oz). The sexes have the same plumage. Adults of the nominate subspecies have a dusky brown crown. They have a small white spot on their lores and bare bluish skin around their eye. Their face from their bill to their eye is black that extends down to include the chin and throat. The sides of their neck are rufous that continues across under the black throat. Their nape, back, rump, and uppertail coverts are brown with a rufescent tinge on the last. Their flight feathers are brown with dusky inner edges and a wide cinnamon band at the base. Their tail is blackish brown. Their upper breast and most of the rest of their underparts are uniform gray. Their flanks have a brown wash and their undertail coverts are dull brownish. They have a dark brown iris, a black bill, and gray to bluish legs and feet. Subspecies F. m. pallidus is much paler than the nominate though darker than pallidus; its breast is light gray and its mantle is light olive brown. F. m. intermedius is also paler than the nominate, with a mouse gray breast and an umber mantle.

== Distribution and habitat ==
The nominate subspecies of the Mayan antthrush is found on the Caribbean slope in the southeastern Mexican states of Veracruz, Oaxaca, Tabasco, and Chiapas. Subspecies F. m. pallidus is found from the Yucatan Peninsula into northern Guatemala. F. m. intermedius is found on the Caribbean slope from Belize and eastern Guatemala to central Honduras. The species primarily inhabits humid evergreen, semi-deciduous, and deciduous forest. It also occurs in coffee plantations and mature secondary forest. In elevation it ranges from sea level to about 1,800 m (5,900 ft).

== Behavior ==
=== Movement ===
The Mayan antthrush is a year-round resident throughout its range.

=== Feeding ===
The Mayan antthrush feeds primarily on a variety of arthropods. It is almost entirely terrestrial. It walks slowly and deliberately with its tail cocked like a little rail.

=== Breeding ===
The Mayan antthrush's breeding season has not been detailed but appears to include at least March to May. Nothing else is known about the species' breeding biology, though it is assumed to be similar to that of its former "parent" black-faced antthrush, which see here.

=== Vocalization ===
The Mayan antthrush's song "begins with a single introductory whistle followed, after a short pause, by a series of 8–14 whistles at a flat pitch, or alternatively gradually increasing or decreasing in pitch piu...piupiupiupiupiupiupiupiupiu!". There appears to be some regional variation in the song. Both sexes sing, primarily in the morning and late afternoon. The species' call is an "emphatic short tleet!".

== Status ==
The IUCN has assessed the Mayan antthrush as being of Least Concern. Its population size is not known and is believed to be decreasing. No immediate threats have been identified. it is considered uncommon to fairly common. "Experimental evidence supports the hypothesis that the Mayan Antthrush is among those forest species less likely to move between patches than non-forest species at the same study site, and that pasture gaps of >50 m already prove significant barriers [which] suggests that habitat loss has a negative effect on the species".
