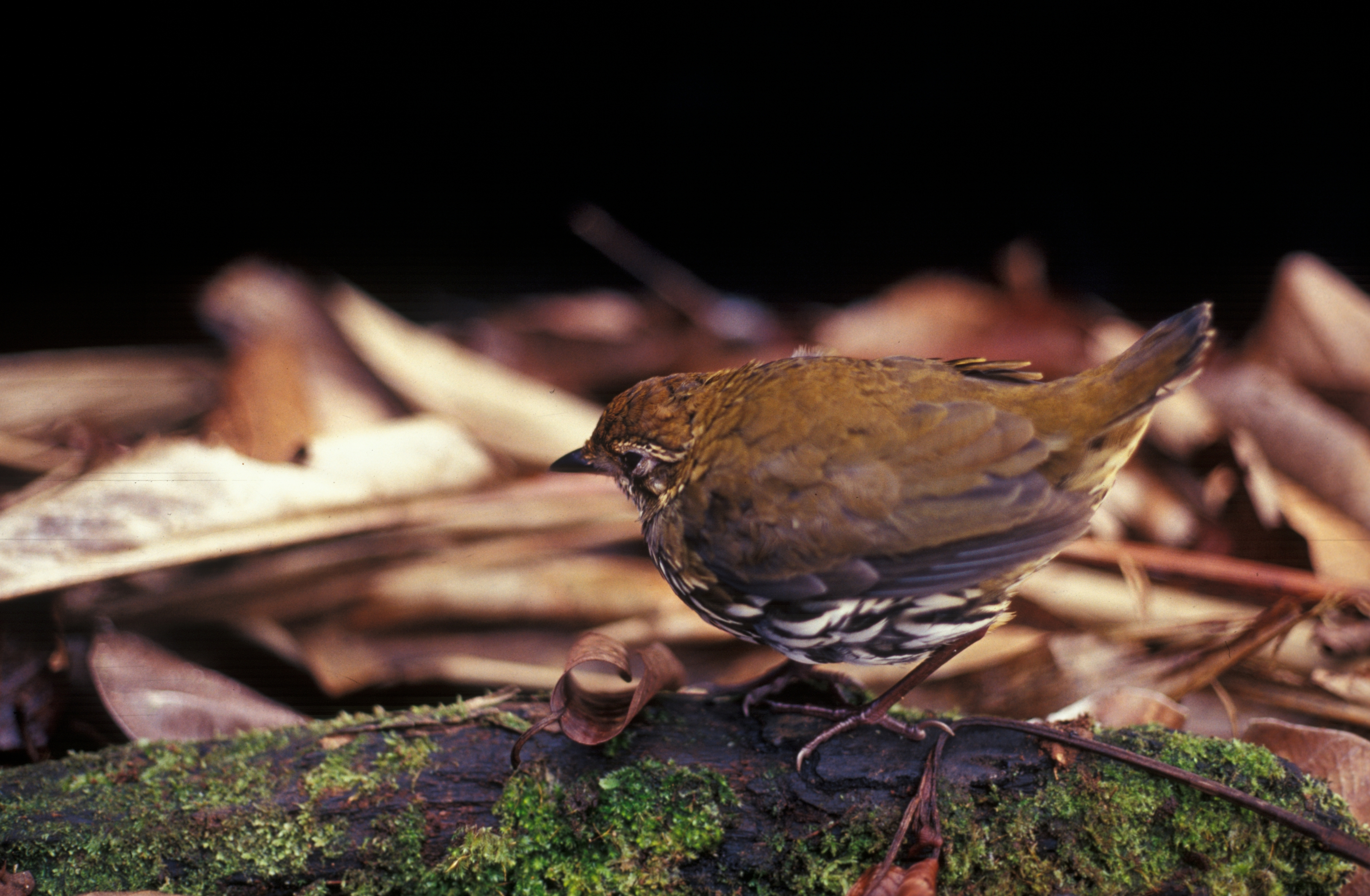
- Striated antthrush

Scientific classification
- Kingdom: Animalia
- Phylum: Chordata
- Class: Aves
- Order: Passeriformes
- Parvorder: Furnariida
- Family: Formicariidae; Gray, 1840

Genera
- Formicarius; Chamaeza

= Formicariidae =

Ground antbirds

Family of birds

Formicariidae is a family of smallish suboscine passerine birds of subtropical and tropical Central and South America known as antthrushes. They are between 10 and 20 cm (4 and 8 in) in length, and are most closely related to the ovenbirds in the family Furnariidae, and the tapaculos in the family Rhinocryptidae. The family Formicariidae contains 12 species in two genera.

These are forest birds that tend to feed on insects at or near the ground. Most are drab in appearance with shades of (rusty) brown, black, and white being their dominant tones. Compared to other birds that specialize in following ants, this family is the most tied to the ground. The long, powerful legs (which lend the birds a distinctive upright posture) and an essentially vestigial tail aid this lifestyle.

They lay two or three eggs in a nest in a tree, both sexes incubating.

== Systematics ==
The antthrushes are similar in appearance to small rails. Their sexes are alike in plumage. The thrush part of the name refers only to the similarity in size (and in Chamaeza also coloration) to true thrushes, not to an evolutionary relationship.

Molecular phylogenetic studies indicated that the Formicariidae as previously delimited were highly paraphyletic, judging from comparison of several mt and nDNA sequences. The aberrant bar-bellied "antpittas" of the genus Pittasoma, which were formerly placed here, belong to the gnateater family (which initially was also considered part of the Formicariidae); as the gnateaters proper, they are sexually dichromatic. In addition, the true antpittas formerly placed in this family are now found in their own family, the Grallariidae. On the other hand, at least a large proportion of the Rhinocryptidae (tapaculos), including the type genus Rhinocrypta, seem to be closer to the antthrushes, but are still considered a distinct family.

The following cladogram shows the phylogeny of the antthrush family. It is based on a large molecular phylogenetic study of the suboscines by Michael Harvey and collaborators that was published in 2020. The species are those recognised by the International Ornithologists' Union (IOC).

- Formicariidae
  - Formicarius
    - Rufous-fronted antthrush (Formicarius rufifrons)
    - - Rufous-capped antthrush (Formicarius colma)
      - - Rufous-breasted antthrush (Formicarius rufipectus)
        - - Mayan antthrush (Formicarius moniliger)
          - - Black-headed antthrush (Formicarius nigricapillus)
            - Black-faced antthrush (Formicarius analis)
  - Chamaeza
    - - Rufous-tailed antthrush (Chamaeza ruficauda)
      - - Cryptic antthrush (Chamaeza meruloides)
        - - Barred antthrush (Chamaeza mollissima)
          - Schwartz's antthrush (Chamaeza turdina)
    - - Short-tailed antthrush (Chamaeza campanisona) (Paraguay race - type)
      - - Striated antthrush (Chamaeza nobilis)
        - Short-tailed antthrush (Chamaeza campanisona) (Guyana, Venezuela, Colombia)

The short-tailed antthrush was found to be paraphyletic. Eleven subspecies are recognised in several disjunct areas and ornithologists had suspected that more than a single species was involved.

Image	Genus	Living species
	Formicarius Boddaert, 1783	Rufous-capped antthrush, Formicarius colma; Black-headed antthrush, Formicarius nigricapillus; Black-faced antthrush, Formicarius analis; Mayan antthrush, Formicarius moniliger; Rufous-fronted antthrush, Formicarius rufifrons; Rufous-breasted antthrush, Formicarius rufipectus
	Chamaeza Vigors, 1825	Short-tailed antthrush, Chamaeza campanisona; Cryptic antthrush, Chamaeza meruloides; Barred antthrush, Chamaeza mollissima; Striated antthrush, Chamaeza nobilis; Rufous-tailed antthrush, Chamaeza ruficauda; Schwartz's antthrush, Chamaeza turdina
