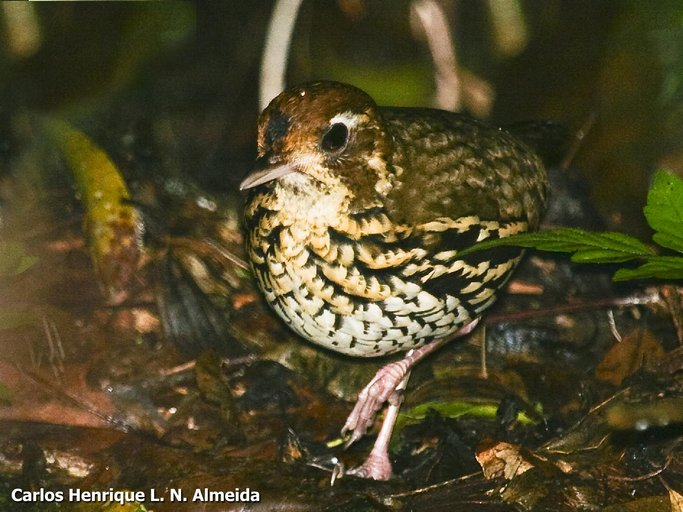

Conservation status
- Least Concern (IUCN 3.1)

Scientific classification
- Kingdom: Animalia
- Phylum: Chordata
- Class: Aves
- Order: Passeriformes
- Family: Formicariidae
- Genus: Chamaeza
- Species: C. campanisona

Binomial name
- Chamaeza campanisona (Lichtenstein, MHC, 1823)
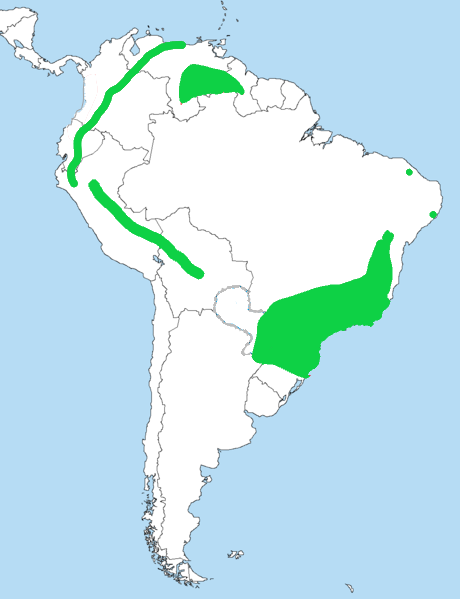

Synonyms
- Chamaeza brevicauda

= Short-tailed antthrush =

Species of bird

The short-tailed antthrush (Chamaeza campanisona) is a species of bird in the family Formicariidae. It is found in every mainland South American country except Chile, French Guiana, and Uruguay.

== Taxonomy and systematics ==
The short-tailed antthrush was first formally described by Vieillot in 1818 as Turdus brevicaudus. However, because that binomial had previously applied to another species, by the principle of priority Lichtenstein's 1823 description as Myiothera campanisona is recognized as the original. The species was later moved to its current genus Chamaeza. Its specific epithet comes from the Latin "campana" (bell) and "sonus" (sound) and refers to the species' bell-like song.

The International Ornithological Congress (IOC) assigns the short-tailed antthrush these 11 subspecies:

- C. c. columbiana Berlepsch & Stolzmann, 1896
- C. c. punctigula Chapman, 1924
- C. c. olivacea Tschudi, 1844
- C. c. huachamacarii Phelps, WH & Phelps, WH Jr, 1951
- C. c. berlepschi Stolzmann, 1926
- C. c. venezuelana Ménégaux & Hellmayr, 1906
- C. c. yavii Phelps, WH & Phelps, WH Jr, 1947
- C. c. obscura Zimmer, JT & Phelps, WH, 1944
- C. c. fulvescens Salvin & Godman, 1882
- C. c. boliviana Hellmayr & Seilern, 1912
- C. c. campanisona (Lichtenstein, MHC, 1823)

A 2003 publication assigns a twelfth subspecies, C. c. tshororo, though the authors note that it is "doubtfully distinct from [the] nominate" C. c. campanisona. The authors also suggest that the short-tailed antthrush as currently known may include as many as four species. The Clements taxonomy and BirdLife International's Handbook of the Birds of the World recognize C. c. tshororo; the IOC includes it in C. c. campanisona.

This article follows the 11-subspecies model.

== Description ==
The short-tailed antthrush is 19 to 25 cm (7.5 to 9.8 in) long and weighs 64 to 112 g (2.3 to 4.0 oz). The sexes are alike. Adults of the nominate subspecies have a rufescent brown or brown crown with a black spot on their forecrown. They have white lores and a white streak behind their eye on an otherwise brown face. Their back, wings, and uppertail coverts are olive brown. Their tail is brown with a black band near the end and thin buff or whitish tips on the feathers. Their throat is white. Their underparts are mostly rich buff with wide black streaks on their breast and flanks and some black bars or spots on their crissum. Their iris is dark brown, their bill black with a paler base to the mandible, and their legs and feet brown or brownish gray.

The other subspecies of the short-tailed antthrush share the nominate's basic pattern with some color variations. Their crowns can be blacker, their lores and postocular streak can be buffy, their upperparts can be less olive and more reddish brown, their underparts' base color can be whiter, and the amount of underpart streaking can be more or less.

== Distribution and habitat ==
The short-tailed antthrush has a highly disjunct distribution. The subspecies are found thus:

- C. c. columbiana: east slope of Colombia's Eastern Andes
- C. c. punctigula: from eastern Ecuador's Napo and Pastaza provinces south into northern Peru to the Marañon River
- C. c. olivacea: east-central Peru from the Department of Junín to the Department of Madre de Dios
- C. c. huachamacarii: Cerro Huachamacari and perhaps other tepuis in southern Venezuela
- C. c. berlepschi: from eastern Department of Cuzco in southern Peru east just into western Bolivia's La Paz Department
- C. c. venezuelana: Venezuelan Coastal Ranges
- C. c. yavii: Cerro Yavi and perhaps other tepuis in south-central Venezuela
- C. c. obscura: tepuis in southeastern Venezuela's Bolívar and southern Amazonas states and adjoining Brazilian tepuis
- C. c. fulvescens: Mt. Roraima in eastern Venezuela and tepuis in western Guyana and central Suriname
- C. c. boliviana: across central Bolivia from La Paz Department to Santa Cruz Department
- C. c. campanisona: eastern Brazil separately in Ceará, Alagoas, and from Bahia south to Rio Grande do Sul, eastern Paraguay, and northeastern Argentina

The short-tailed antthrush inhabits humid foothill and montane forests and woodlands throughout its several discrete ranges. In eastern Brazil it also occurs in lowland evergreen forest. In elevation it occurs between 500 and 1,800 m (1,600 and 5,900 ft) in Colombia, between 950 and 1,700 m (3,120 and 5,580 ft) in Ecuador, between 900 and 1,700 m (3,000 and 5,600 ft) in Peru, between 800 and 2,800 m (2,600 and 9,200 ft) in Bolivia, between 450 and 1,850 m (1,500 and 6,100 ft) in Venezuela, and between sea level and 1,000 m (3,300 ft) in most of Brazil and to 1,500 m (4,900 ft) on the tepuis.

== Behavior ==
=== Movement ===
The short-tailed antthrush is a year-round resident throughout its range.

=== Feeding ===
The short-tailed antthrush's diet and foraging behavior are not known, though it is assumed to eat mostly insects and other arthropods and perhaps also small vertebrates. It is almost entirely terrestrial. It walks slowly and deliberately, pumping its tail and meandering through thick vegetation and along roots and logs. It has been observed following army ants but generally forages apart from them.

=== Breeding ===
The short-tailed antthrush's breeding season appears to vary geographically but includes months between September and January. The few known nests were in cavities in live trees between 1 and 3 m (3 and 10 ft) above the ground. The usual clutch size is not known though one nest contained three eggs. The incubation period and details of parental care are unknown. The time from hatch to fledging is believed to be 16 to 19 days.

=== Vocalization ===
The short-tailed antthrush's song varies somewhat among the subspecies. One example is "a ventriloquial, trogon-like [series] of about 10 accelerating and rising woo notes followed by an abruptly slowing and falling series of woop notes" (Colombia). Another is "a series of hollow musical 'cow' notes that start slowly but quickly accelerate and become louder, then abruptly shift into [a] descending series of 4-6 lower-pitched 'wo' or 'wop' notes that gradually become weaker and fade away (Ecuador). A third is "a moderate-paced, slightly accelerating, rising series of hollow, hooted whistles that abruptly become a descending, decelerating series of descending popping notes: pup u-pu-pu-pu'PU'PU'PUPUPU'WAH-wah-wah-wah" (Peru). Songs in other areas are faster or slower or have more or fewer notes. The species' calls include "a sharp quock", "a sharp quoak", and "a liquid, rising quork note, sometimes given in a series, particularly in flight".

== Status ==
The IUCN has assessed the short-tailed antthrush as being of Least Concern. It has a very large range; its population size is not known and is believed to be decreasing. No immediate threats have been identified. It is generally considered common but fairly common in Colombia and Venezuela and rare to uncommon in Peru. "[A]s is true of all species that are restricted to forest, it is vulnerable to habitat degradation or loss."
