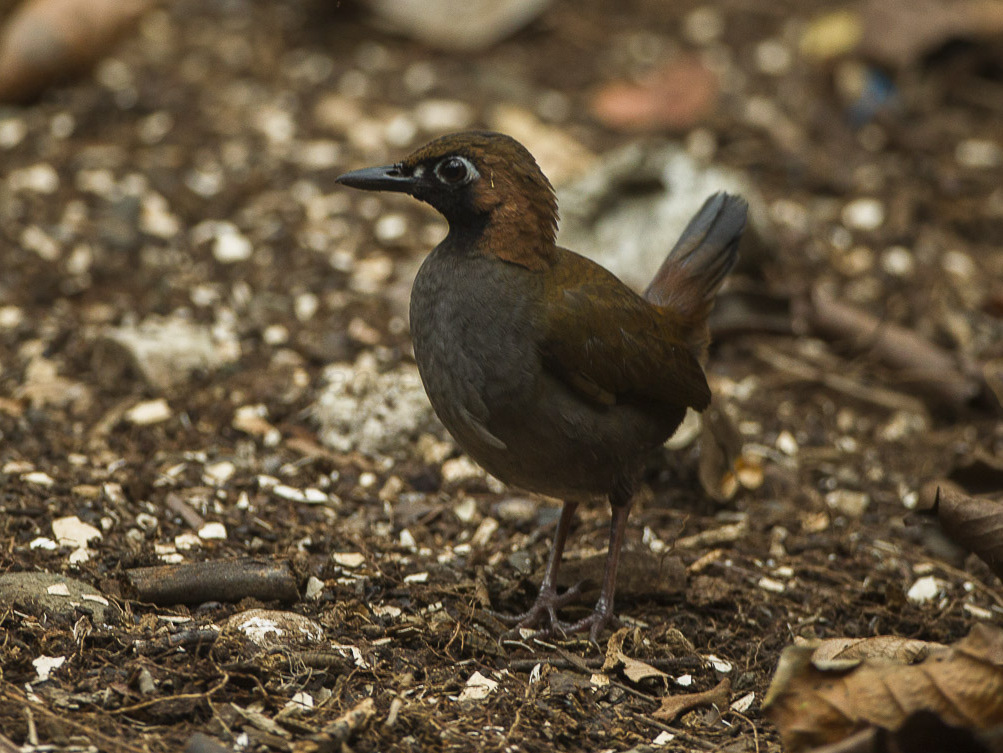

Conservation status
- Least Concern (IUCN 3.1)

Scientific classification
- Kingdom: Animalia
- Phylum: Chordata
- Class: Aves
- Order: Passeriformes
- Family: Formicariidae
- Genus: Formicarius
- Species: F. analis

Binomial name
- Formicarius analis (d'Orbigny & Lafresnaye, 1837)
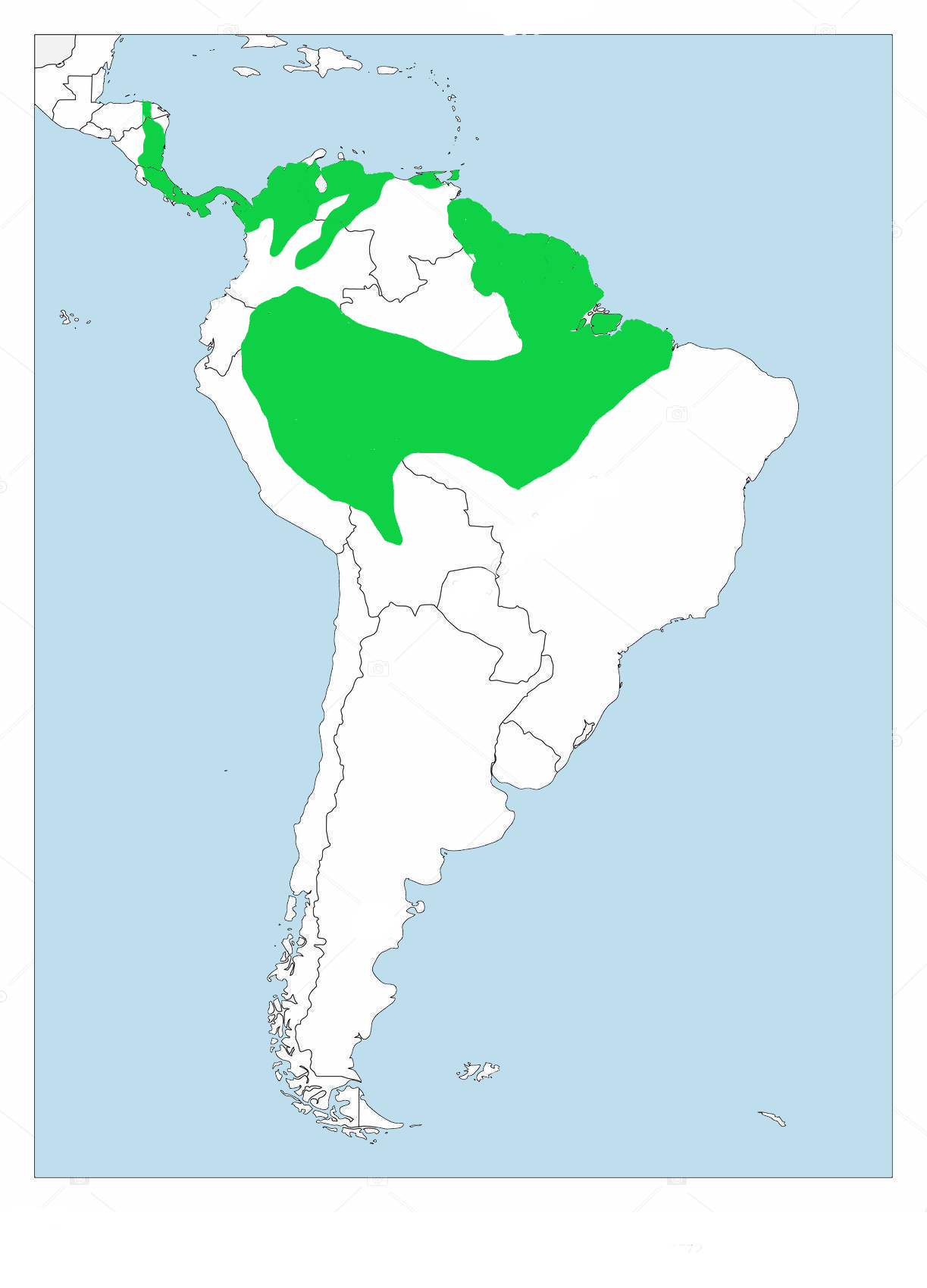

= Black-faced antthrush =

Species of bird

The black-faced antthrush (Formicarius analis) is a species of passerine bird in the family Formicariidae. It is found in Central America from Honduras through Panama, on Trinidad, and in every mainland South American country except Argentina, Chile, Paraguay, and Uruguay.

== Taxonomy and systematics ==
The black-faced antthrush was formally described in 1837 by the French naturalists Alcide d'Orbigny and Frédéric de Lafresnaye from a specimen collected in Bolivia. They coined the binomial name Myothera analis. The specific epithet is from the Modern Latin analis meaning "relating to the undertail-coverts of the vent". In 1858 it was moved to genus Formicarius that had been introduced by the Dutch naturalist Pieter Boddaert in 1783.

The black-faced antthrush has these 11 subspecies:

- F. a. umbrosus Ridgway, 1893
- F. a. hoffmanni (Cabanis, 1861)
- F. a. panamensis Ridgway, 1908
- F. a. virescens Todd, 1915
- F. a. saturatus Ridgway, 1893
- F. a. griseoventris Aveledo & Ginés, 1950
- F. a. connectens Chapman, 1914
- F. a. zamorae Chapman, 1923
- F. a. crissalis (Cabanis, 1861)
- F. a. analis (d'Orbigny & Lafresnaye, 1837)
- F. a. paraensis Novaes, 1957

The first five subspecies on the above list are treated by some taxonomists as the "Central American" group of black-faced anthrushes and the other six as the "black-faced" or analis group. Others treat only the first three as the "hoffmanni group" and are unsure whether virescens and saturatus belong with them or with the "black-faced" group. The two groups, however populated, might represent separate species.

What is now the Mayan antthrush (Formicarius moniliger), with three subspecies, was formerly considered conspecific with the black-faced antthrush. By 2021 major taxonomic systems had adopted the split.

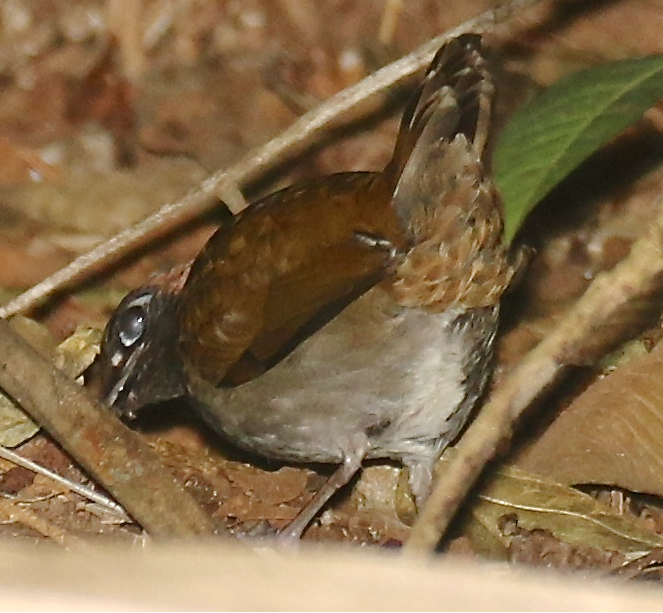
Chan Chich Lodge area, Belize – flash photo

== Description ==
The black-faced antthrush is 15 to 19 cm (5.9 to 7.5 in) long and weighs about 50 to 75 g (1.8 to 2.6 oz). The sexes have the same plumage. Adults of the nominate subspecies F. a. analis have a dusky brown crown. They have a small white spot on their lores and bare bluish skin around their eye. Their face from their bill to their eye is black that extends down to include the chin and throat. The rest of their face, their nape, back, and rump are brown. Their flight feathers are brown with dusky inner edges and a wide cinnamon band at the base; their wing coverts are brown with a rufescent tinge. Their tail is blackish brown. Their upper breast is dark gray and most of the rest of their underparts are a lighter gray that is lightest in the center of their belly. Their flanks have a brown wash and their undertail coverts are rufous. They have a dark brown iris, a black bill, and gray to bluish legs and feet.

The other subspecies of the black-faced antthrush differ from the nominate and each other thus:

- F. a. umbrosus: like the nominate but with brownish undertail coverts
- F. a. hoffmanni: pale rufescent or cinnamon crown, little or no white lores spot, and dark cinnamon wash on undertail coverts
- F. a. panamensis: pale rufescent or cinnamon crown, little or no white lores spot, olive-tinged brownish breast, and tawny undertail coverts
- F. a. virescens: pale rufescent or cinnamon crown, little or no white lores spot, olivaceous mantle, olive-tinged brownish breast, and tawny undertail coverts
- F. a. saturatus: pale rufescent or cinnamon crown, little or no white lores spot, cinnamon edge on throat, rufescent-brown mantle, brownish gray breast, and tawny-rusty undertail coverts
- F. a. griseoventris: pale rufescent or cinnamon crown, little or no white lores spot, and olivaceous mantle, gray breast, and tawny undertail coverts
- F. a. connectens: pale rufescent or cinnamon crown, little or no white lores spot, olivaceous mantle, slate-gray breast, and tawny-rusty undertail coverts
- F. a. zamorae: pale rufescent or cinnamon crown, little or no white lores spot, olivaceous mantle, slate-gray breast, sooty slate vent area, and rich chestnut undertail coverts
- F. a. crissalis: pale rufescent or cinnamon crown, prominent lores spot, vinaceous-rust ear coverts, cinnamon edge on throat, rufescent-brown mantle, brownish rump and uppertail coverts, brownish gray breast, whitish vent area, and tawny undertail coverts
- F. a. paraensis: pale rufescent or cinnamon crown, prominent lores spot, vinaceous ear coverts, cinnamon edge on throat, olive-tinged rufescent-brown mantle, ferruginous rump and uppertail coverts, brownish gray breast, whitish vent area, and tawny undertail coverts

== Distribution and habitat ==
The black-faced antthrush has a disjunct distribution, with a large gap north of the Amazon in northwestern Brazil, southern Venezuela, and eastern Colombia. The subspecies are found thus:

- F. a. umbrosus: Caribbean slope from eastern Honduras through Nicaragua and Costa Rica into western Panama
- F. a. hoffmanni: Pacific slope from central Costa Rica to southwestern Panama
- F. a. panamensis: from eastern Panama's Darién Province into northwestern Colombia
- F. a. virescens: Sierra Nevada de Santa Marta in northeastern Colombia
- F. a. saturatus: Colombia's Magdalena River Valley, northwestern Venezuela north of the Orinoco River, and Trinidad
- F. a. griseoventris: Serranía del Perijá and nearby on the northeastern Colombia and northwestern Venezuela border
- F. a. connectens: east of the Andes in eastern Colombia
- F. a. zamorae: eastern Ecuador, northern Peru, and northwestern Brazil
- F. a. crissalis: on the Guianan Shield from eastern Venezuela's Bolívar state east through the Guianas into northeastern Brazil north of the Amazon
- F. a. analis: Amazon Basin of eastern and southeastern Peru, northern Bolivia, and central Brazil
- F. a. paraensis: southeastern Amazonian Brazil

The black-faced antthrush inhabits primary forest and mature secondary forest, primarily várzea and transitional forest and to a much smaller extent terra firme. In parts of Brazil it is associated with bamboo. In elevation it reaches to 500 m (1,600 ft) in eastern Costa Rica, to 1,500 m (4,900 ft) in western Costa Rica, to 1,000 m (3,300 ft) in Colombia, Ecuador, and Brazil, to 1,150 m (3,800 ft) in Peru, and in Venezuela to 800 m (2,600 ft) south of the Orinoco and 1,700 m (5,600 ft) north of it.

== Behavior ==
=== Movement ===
The black-faced antthrush is a year-round resident throughout its range.

=== Feeding ===
The black-faced antthrush feeds primarily on a variety of arthropods and also includes small vertebrates such as frogs and lizards in its diet. It is almost entirely terrestrial. It walks slowly and deliberately with its tail cocked like a little rail, sweeping or flicking aside leaf litter with its bill, and often moves in circles. It very rarely deviates from this behavior by leaping into the air to capture fleeing prey. It often but not regularly attends army ant swarms to capture prey fleeing the ants.

=== Breeding ===
The black-faced antthrush's breeding season has not been fully defined, but is known to span March to October in Costa Rica and to include November in Amazonian Brazil. It does not build a conventional nest but makes a platform of dead leaves and flowers at the bottom of a tree or stump cavity. Many cavities have an open top. The cavities have been noted between 0.5 and 3.4 m (2 and 11 ft) above the ground. The clutch size is two white eggs. The incubation period is 17 to 20 days and fledging occurs 17 to 20 days after hatch. Both parents incubate the clutch during the day and probably the female alone at night. Both parents provision nestlings.

=== Vocalization ===
The three subspecies of the black-faced antthrush's hoffmanni group sing "an emphatic flat-pitched introductory whistle at ca. 2.0 kHz, followed by a slow series of 1–4 similar but slightly lower-pitched whistles (the latter maintaining about the same pitch). It has also been described as "a labored pyee, pyew, pyew; the first note (accented and higher) is usually followed by two or three notes, but sometimes as many as ten or more". The song of members of the analis group "begins with an emphatic flat-pitched introductory whistle at ca. 2.0 kHz followed by a fast series of typically 8–15 shorter whistles in a sputtering, mainly falling trill". It has been written as "tüüü, ti-ti-tí-tí-tí-te-te-tu-tu-tu-tu". All of the subspecies apparently give an "emphatic short tleet!" call.

== Status ==
The IUCN has assessed the black-faced antthrush as being of Least Concern. It has a very large range; its population size is not known and is believed to be decreasing. No immediate threats have been identified. It is considered common in Costa Rica, Peru, and Venezuela, fairly common in Colombia, and "widespread and numerous" in Ecuador. "The species will recolonize forest patches a short time after isolation if there is some habitat connectivity [but] is reported to be sensitive to logging activities and associated habitat alteration, and to oil exploration".
