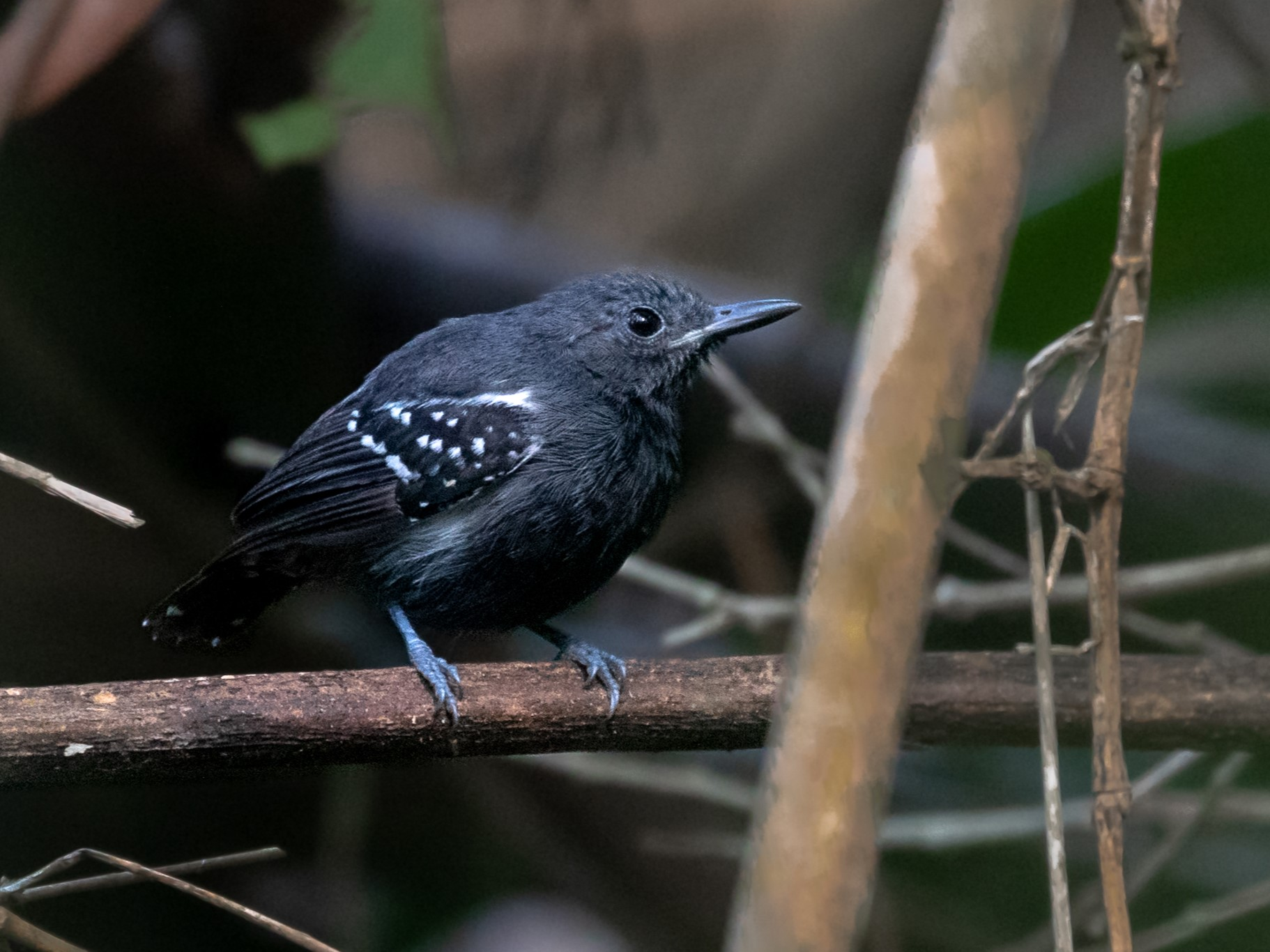
- Male in Acre, Brazil Song of the white-flanked antwren

Conservation status
- Least Concern (IUCN 3.1)

Scientific classification
- Kingdom: Animalia
- Phylum: Chordata
- Class: Aves
- Order: Passeriformes
- Family: Thamnophilidae
- Genus: Myrmotherula
- Species: M. axillaris

Binomial name
- Myrmotherula axillaris (Vieillot, 1817)

= White-flanked antwren =

Species of bird

The white-flanked antwren (Myrmotherula axillaris) is a species of bird in subfamily Thamnophilinae of family Thamnophilidae, the "typical antbirds". It is found from Honduras to Panama in Central America, in every mainland South American country except Argentina, Chile, Paraguay, and Uruguay, and on Trinidad.

== Taxonomy and systematics ==
The white-flanked antwren was described by the French ornithologist Louis Pierre Vieillot in 1817 and given the binomial name Myrmothera axillaris.

The white-flanked antwren's taxonomy is unsettled. The International Ornithological Committee (IOC) and BirdLife International's Handbook of the Birds of the World assign it these five subspecies:

- M. a. albigula Lawrence, 1865
- M. a. melaena (Sclater, PL, 1857)
- M. a. heterozyga Zimmer, JT, 1932
- M. a. axillaris (Vieillot, 1817)
- M. a. fresnayana (d'Orbigny, 1835)

The Clements taxonomy adds a sixth subspecies, M. a. luctuosa, that the other two systems treat as a separate species, the silvery-flanked antwren (M. luctuosa). The North and South American Classification Committees of the American Ornithological Society also include the silvery-flanked taxon within the white-flanked antwren. Clements does recognize the taxon as its own "group" within the white-flanked species.

This article follows the five-subspecies model.

== Description ==
The white-flanked antwren is 9 to 10.5 cm (3.5 to 4.1 in) long and weighs 5 to 10.6 g (0.18 to 0.37 oz) with some variation in weight among the subspecies. It is a smallish bird with a short tail. Adult males of the nominate subspecies M. a. axillaris have a dark gray head, neck, back, and rump with a hidden white patch between the shoulders. Their tail is blackish with white tips to the feathers. Their wings are blackish with white tips on the coverts and gray edges on the flight feathers. Their throat, breast, and the center of their belly are black, their flanks the eponymous white, and their crissum gray with black and white tips on the feathers. Adult nominate females have a mottled pale olive-brown face. Their upperparts are olive-brown that becomes reddish yellow-brown on the rump. Their tail feathers are dark brown with light cinnamon-rufous edges. Their wings are dark brown with cinnamon edges on the coverts and light cinnamon-rufous edges on the flight feathers. Their throat and flanks are white, their breast and belly rich buff, their sides olive-brown, and their crissum reddish brown. Juvenile males resemble adult females but with mixed yellow-brown and gray upperparts and wings and mixed white and gray underparts.

The other four subspecies of the white-flanked antwren differ from the nominate and each other thus:

- M. a. albigula: male blacker than nominate but variable, with wide white edges on the scapulars; female has grayer upperparts than nominate, with pale buff tips on wing coverts, and paler below with a buff crissum
- M. a. melaena: male like albigula; female like nominate but paler
- M. a. heterozyga: male slightly paler than nominate with less extensive black underparts; female paler and less rufescent than nominate and with buff tips on the flight feathers
- M. a. fresnayana: like heterozyga

== Distribution and habitat ==
The white-flanked antwren ranges from Honduras to central South America. The subspecies are found thus:

- M. a. albigula: Caribbean slope of Central America from Honduras south through Nicaragua, Costa Rica, and Panama into northern Colombia, and Pacific slope from Panamá and Darién provinces of Panama south through western Colombia into Ecuador as far as Azuay Province; also a single record from Chiapas, Mexico
- M. a. melaena: Colombia's isolated Sierra Nevada de Santa Marta; from Colombia east of the Andes and western Venezuela south through eastern Ecuador into northeastern Peru and east in Brazil north of the Amazon to the Rio Negro
- M. a. heterozyga: from east-central Peru's departments of Ucayali and Madre de Dios east into Brazil south of the Amazon to the Rio Madeira
- M. a. axillaris: Trinidad and from eastern Venezuela south through western Brazil into northern Bolivia and east through the Guianas and across much of northern Amazonian Brazil
- M. a. fresnayana: far southeastern Peru's Department of Puno and northwestern and central Bolivia

The white-flanked antwren inhabits the understorey and mid-storey of evergreen forest including terra firme, várzea, igapó, and transitional types. It also occurs in secondary woodland. Within these forest types some populations specialize in microhabitats. For instance, in part of its Brazilian range M. a. axillaris favors stands of Guadua bamboo while in some other parts it apparently shuns them. Overall the species occurs from sea level to about 1,100 m (3,600 ft) and locally to 1,400 m (4,600 ft). In Honduras it reaches only 450 m (1,500 ft), in Costa Rica 900 m (3,000 ft), in Colombia 1,000 m (3,300 ft), in Ecuador 900 m (3,000 ft), and in Brazil is found mostly below 1,100 m (3,600 ft).

== Behavior ==
=== Movement ===
The white-flanked antwren is believed to be a year-round resident throughout its range.

=== Feeding ===
The white-flanked antwren feeds on arthropods, mostly insects and spiders. It forages singly, in pairs, or in family groups, and in most areas usually as part of a mixed-species feeding flock. It typically forages in dense vegetation between about 2 and 12 m (7 and 40 ft) above the ground. It actively seeks prey mostly by gleaning leaves, and also takes prey from vine tangles and along branches by gleaning, reaching, lunging, and with short sallies from a perch. There are records of the species following army ant swarms but for only a few minutes.

=== Breeding ===
The white-flanked antwren's breeding seasons vary somewhat across its range but all fall within February to December. Its nest is a deep cup made of dead leaves and leaf skeletons that is lined, held together, and hung in a branch fork by fungal rhizomorphs. Typically it is placed up to about 4 m (13 ft) above the ground in a shrub or small tree and is hidden by overhanging leaves. The clutch size is two eggs; they are white or pinkish white with variable reddish brown, deep purple, or lilac markings. At nests studied in Panama the incubation period was 16 to 19 days; both parents incubated during the day and the female alone at night. The time to fledging was eight to 12 days and both parents provisioned the nestlings.

=== Vocalization ===
The white-flanked antwren's song differs among the subspecies. That of M. a. axillaris, M. a. heterozyga, and M. a. fresnayana is "a rapid uncountable series of abrupt notes, somewhat low-pitched...dropping sharply in pitch and gaining in intensity at beginning, then more or less levelling". Its pace varies somewhat across its area. The song of M. a. albigula and M. a. melaena is "a countable, evenly paced series of whistles...dropping in pitch, but gaining and then dropping in intensity". Calls seem to vary little across the subspecies though not all calls are made by all subspecies. Calls include "two notes, first shorter and higher-pitched, sometimes extended to 3–4 notes", a "sharp upslurred 'wheep', sometimes doubled or tripled", a "very short 'pip' ", a "much longer 'chirr' ", and "a rattle".

== Status ==
The IUCN has assessed the white-flanked antwren as being of Least Concern. It has an extremely large range; its population size is not known and is believed to be decreasing. No immediate threats have been identified. It is considered fairly common to common in most of its range. It occurs in many protected areas, "as well as vast contiguous areas of intact, suitable habitat that are not formally protected". It "is seemingly more tolerant of disturbance than are congeners, its numbers even apparently increasing in Amazonian forest exposed to fire".
