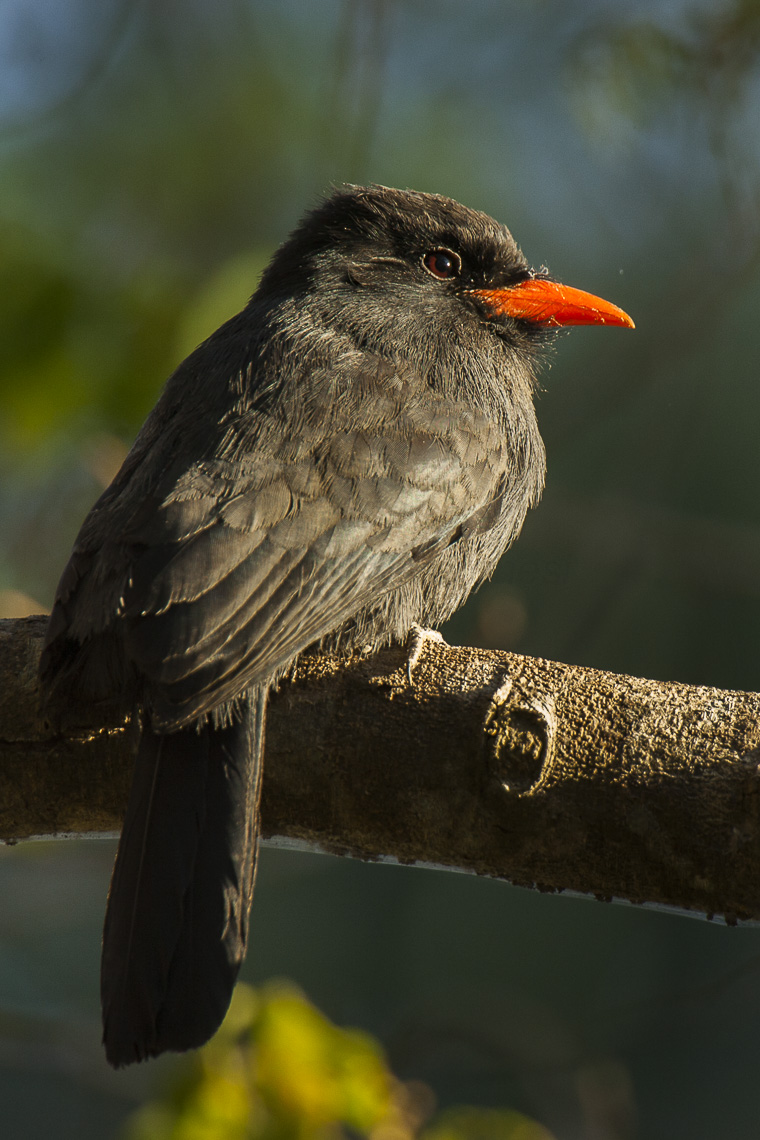

Conservation status
- Least Concern (IUCN 3.1)

Scientific classification
- Kingdom: Animalia
- Phylum: Chordata
- Class: Aves
- Order: Piciformes
- Family: Bucconidae
- Genus: Monasa
- Species: M. nigrifrons

Binomial name
- Monasa nigrifrons (Spix, 1824)

= Black-fronted nunbird =

Species of bird

The black-fronted nunbird (Monasa nigrifrons) is a species of bird in the family Bucconidae, the puffbirds, nunlets, and nunbirds. It is found in Bolivia, Brazil, Colombia, Ecuador, and Peru.

== Taxonomy and systematics ==
The black-fronted nunbird has two subspecies, the nominate M. n. nigrifrons and M. n. canescens. Some authors treat it, the black nunbird (M. atra) and the white-fronted nunbird (M. morphoeus) as a superspecies.

== Description ==
The black-fronted nunbird is 26 to 29 cm (10 to 11 in) long and weighs 68 to 98 g (2.4 to 3.5 oz). The adult of the nominate subspecies is mostly sooty black that is darkest around the bill (the "front"). The rear part of the body is blue-gray and the tail blue-black. The bill is red, the eye dark, and the legs black. M. n. canescens is slightly paler and grayer than the nominate. The juvenile of both is a dirty slate gray with irregular reddish marks.

== Distribution and habitat ==
The nominate subspecies of black-fronted nunbird is widespread in the Amazon Basin. It is found in southeastern Colombia, eastern Ecuador, eastern Peru, and much of Brazil. In Brazil it occurs north of the Amazon as far east as the Rio Negro and south of the Amazon as far east as Pará and Alagoas states and south to eastern Mato Grosso do Sul and western São Paulo states. M. n. canescens is found only in eastern Bolivia.

The black-fronted nunbird inhabits a variety of landscapes, but favors trees and bamboo along the margins of rivers and lakes. Principal forest types include várzea, igapó and gallery. It is also found in secondary forest, swampy river islands, transitional forest, and mid-succession to mature floodplain forest. Unlike many other nunbirds, it shuns terra firme forest. In elevation it is found from sea level to 1,000 m (3,300 ft).

== Behavior ==
=== Feeding ===
The black-fronted nunbird takes most of its prey in flight, though it also picks it from the ground and foliage up to about 6 m (20 ft) above it. Its diet is mostly insects and also includes other arthropods and small lizards and amphibians. It follows troops of primates and army ant swarms to capture prey dislodged by them, and sometimes also joins mixed-species foraging flocks.

=== Breeding ===
The black-fronted nunbird's breeding season varies geographically but generally spans from April to October. It nests in a hole excavated in a bank or gently sloping or flat ground. The clutch size is three eggs.

=== Vocalization ===
The black-fronted nunbird's song is " a rapid series of melodious upslurred 'clerry' or 'curry' whistles, broken by [an] occasional downslurred 'turra turra' trill". It is often sung as a chorus by several birds.

== Status ==
The IUCN has assessed the black-fronted nunbird as being of Least Concern. It has an extremely large range, but its population has not been quantified and is believed to be decreasing. It is common to abundant in most of its range.
