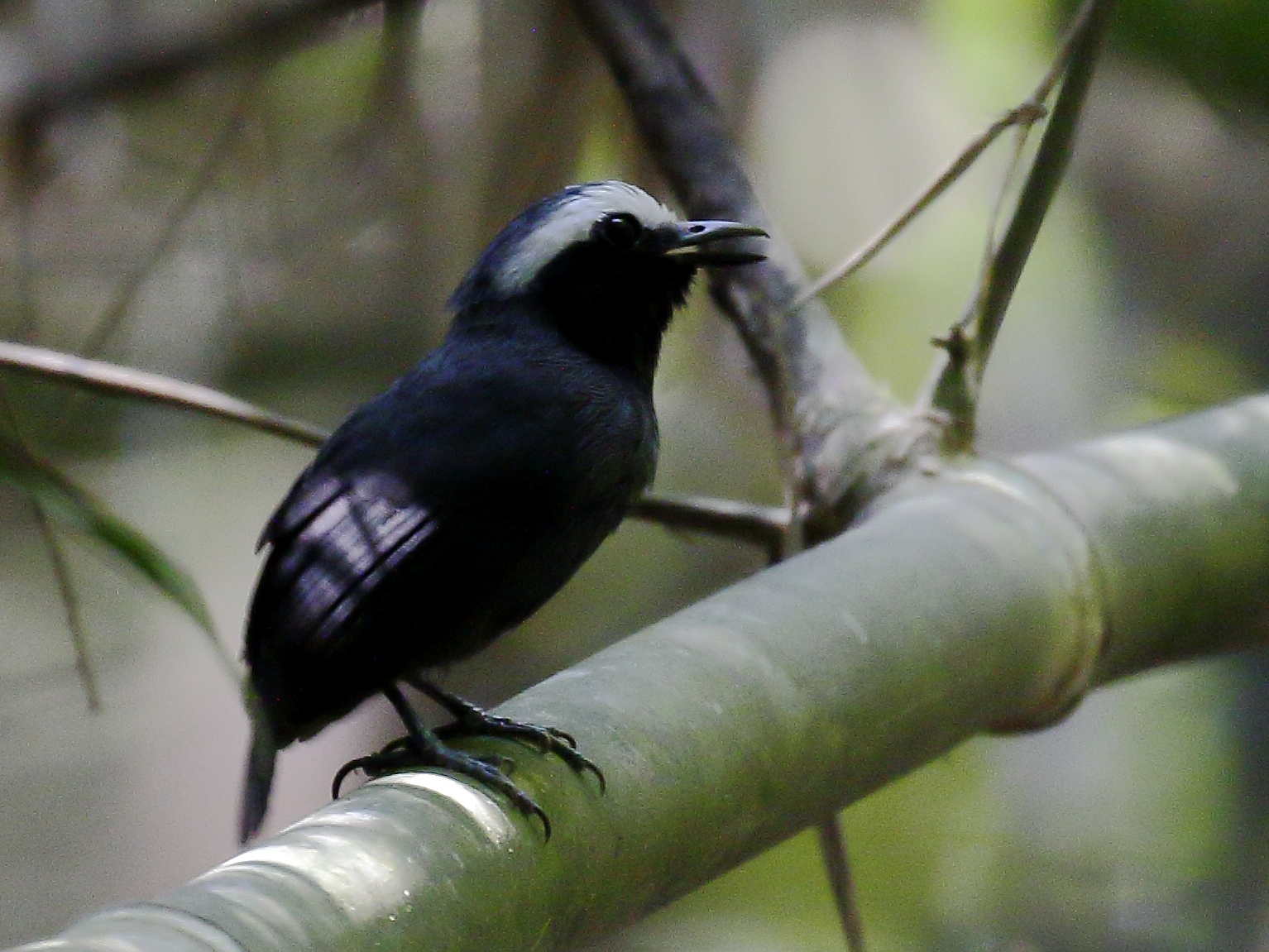
- Male of the nominate subspecies M. l. leucophrys
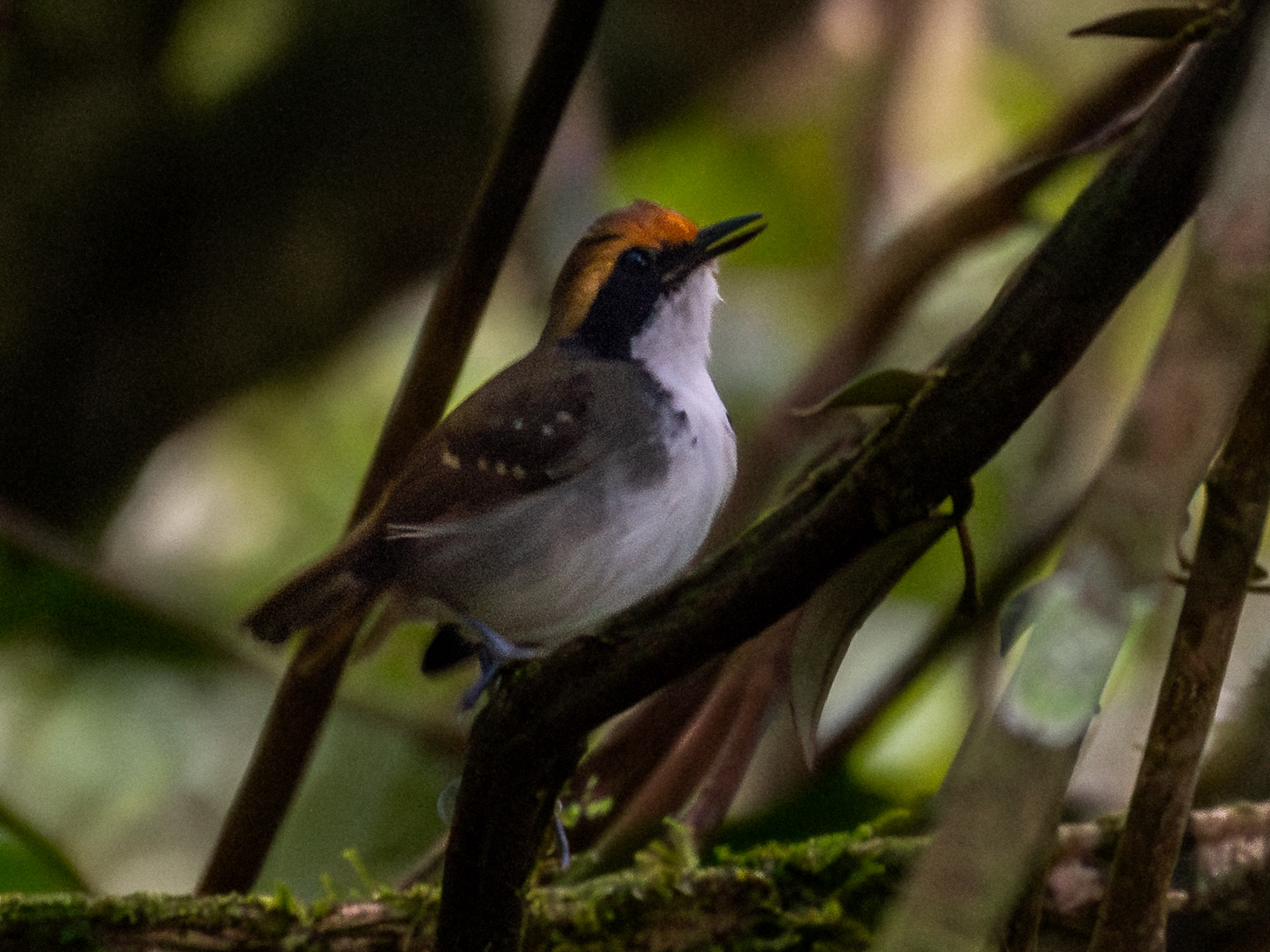
- Female M. l. angustirostris

Conservation status
- Least Concern (IUCN 3.1)

Scientific classification
- Kingdom: Animalia
- Phylum: Chordata
- Class: Aves
- Order: Passeriformes
- Family: Thamnophilidae
- Genus: Myrmoborus
- Species: M. leucophrys

Binomial name
- Myrmoborus leucophrys (Tschudi, 1844)

= White-browed antbird =

Species of bird

The white-browed antbird (Myrmoborus leucophrys) is a species of perching bird in subfamily Thamnophilinae of family Thamnophilidae, the "typical antbirds". It is found in every mainland South American country except Argentina, Chile, Paraguay, and Uruguay.

== Taxonomy and systematics ==
The white-browed antbird was described in 1844 as Pithys leucophrys. It eventually was determined to have these four subspecies:

- M. l. erythrophrys (Sclater, PL, 1855)
- M. l. leucophrys (Tschudi, 1844)
- M. l. angustirostris (Cabanis, 1849)
- M. l. koenigorum O'Neill & Parker, TA, 1997

Other subspecies and the geographical redistribution of these four have been suggested but as of 2024 not accepted. Authors have suggested that some of the subspecies might better be treated as full species.

== Description ==
The white-browed antbird is 12 to 13.5 cm (4.7 to 5.3 in) long and weighs 18 to 22 g (0.63 to 0.78 oz). Adult males of the nominate subspecies M. l. leucophrys have the eponymous white forehead and supercilium. They are otherwise mostly dark bluish gray that is darkest on their wings and tail and lightest on their crissum. Their face below the white, their chin, and their throat are black. Adult females have a cinnamon to yellow-buff forehead and supercilium. Their crown is olive-brown with a reddish tinge and the rest of their face is black. They have olive-brown upperparts. Their wings and tail are dark yellowish brown with pinkish to pale buff-brown tips on their wing coverts. Their throat and underparts are mostly white with some blackish gray on the sides and light olive-gray flanks.

Males of subspecies M. l. angustirostris are similar to nominate males but paler. Females have a paler supercilium than the nominate and paler (almost white) tips on the wing coverts. Males of M. l. erythrophrys have a wider white forehead band and supercilium and a less well-defined black throat than the nominate. Females have a darker and redder supercilium that has little contrast from the crown. Males of M. l. koenigorum have an entirely white crown and the black of their throat extends onto the breast. Females are similar to erythrophrys females.

== Distribution and habitat ==
The white-browed antbird has a curious distribution across the northern Amazon Basin and the Guianan Shield and in the southern Amazon Basin, but not in a large area of Amazonia between them. The subspecies are found thus:

- M. l. erythrophrys: east slope of the Andes from northwestern Venezuela south into Colombia to the Putumayo River
- M. l. leucophrys: from the Putumayo in extreme southern Colombia south on the east slope of the Andes of eastern Ecuador and eastern Peru into northeastern Bolivia, and east across much of southern Amazonian Brazil south of the Amazon
- M. l. angustirostris: from southern Venezuela east across the Guianas and northern Brazil north of the Amazon to the Atlantic in Amapá state
- M. l. koenigorum: upper valley of the Huallaga River in Peru's Department of Huánuco

The white-browed antbird uses various habitats in different parts of its range. In the Amazon Basin it typically occurs near water, using both várzea and transitional forests. There it favors heavy shrub cover and Heliconia thickets and sometimes bamboo. Subspecies M. l. angustirostris is often found in similar habitat but about equally on the edges and in overgrown clearings of terra firme forest. A relatively small part of the angustirostris population in southern Venezuela also occurs on shrubby and stunted woodlands on white-sand soils bordering savanna. Along the slopes of the Andes, the other three subspecies use a similar mix of habitats as most of angustirostris. In elevation the species occurs up to 400 m (1,300 ft) in Colombia, 1,100 m (3,600 ft) in Ecuador, 1,400 m (4,600 ft) in Peru, 1,000 m (3,300 ft) in Venezuela, and perhaps to 800 m (2,600 ft) in Brazil.

== Behavior ==
=== Movement ===
The white-browed antbird is believed to be a year-round resident throughout its range.

=== Feeding ===
The white-browed antbird feed on a wide variety of insects and spiders. It typically forages singly, in pairs, or in small family groups in dense vegetation, mostly on the ground or within about 1 m (3 ft) of it and rarely up 3 m (10 ft). It hops and makes short flights between feeding stops, bobbing its tail. It captures prey by gleaning, jumping, lunging, and making short sallies from a perch; it also drops to the ground to snatch prey. It regularly attends army ant swarms to capture prey fleeing the ants, but is subordinate to obligate ant-followers. It seldom joins mixed-species feeding flocks.

=== Breeding ===
The white-browed antbird's breeding season has not been defined but in Peru it includes May. The one known nest was made from bamboo leaves and placed on the ground. It contained two brown-specked whitish eggs. Nothing else is known about the species' breeding biology.

=== Vocalization ===
The male white-browed antbird's song is "a long (e.g. 4 seconds) trill typically increasing in intensity and pace initially, dropping slightly in pitch at end"; the female's is "shorter and often rising in pitch initially". The subspecies' songs differ greatly in their pace. The species' calls include a short whistle that varies geographically from clear to nasal or burry. They also make a "short 'chip' (may not occur in all regions), and [a] short, rather high-pitched rattle diminishing in intensity and pitch and typically repeated rapidly at short intervals".

== Status ==
The IUCN has assessed the white-browed antbird as being of Least Concern. It has a very large range; its population size is not known and is believed to be ddecreasing. No immediate threats have been identified. It is considered fairly common across its range. "The species' ability to occupy a variety of second-growth habitats renders it less vulnerable to disturbance than are many other antbird species. Populations confined to lower Andean slopes and inter-Andean valleys potentially at greatest risk; not only are their ranges more restricted, but foothill forest throughout Andes is being cleared for agriculture and human settlement at alarming rates."
