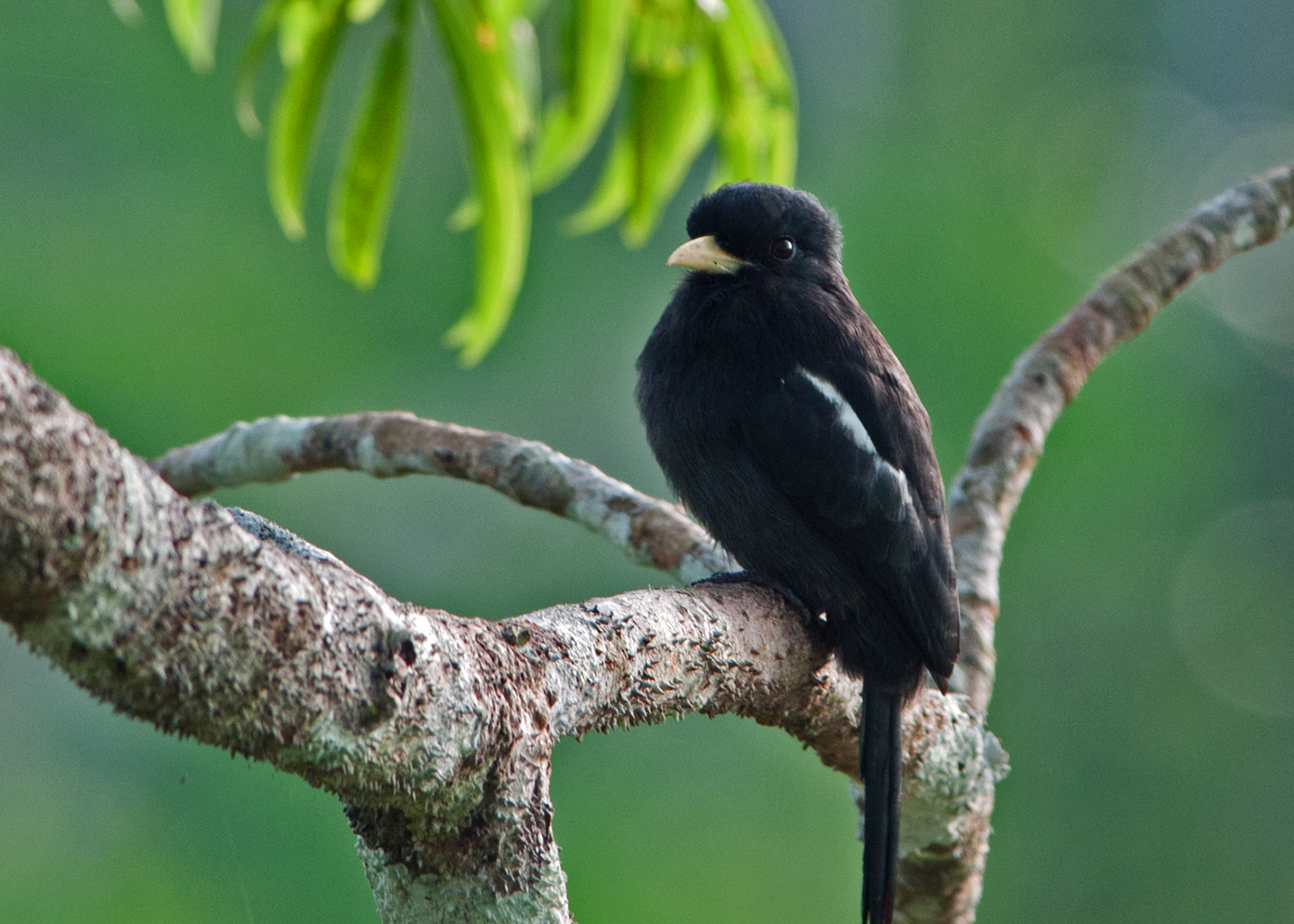

Conservation status
- Least Concern (IUCN 3.1)

Scientific classification
- Kingdom: Animalia
- Phylum: Chordata
- Class: Aves
- Order: Piciformes
- Family: Bucconidae
- Genus: Monasa
- Species: M. flavirostris

Binomial name
- Monasa flavirostris Strickland, 1850

= Yellow-billed nunbird =

Species of bird

The yellow-billed nunbird (Monasa flavirostris) is a species of bird in the family Bucconidae, the puffbirds, nunlets, and nunbirds. It is found in Bolivia, Brazil, Colombia, Ecuador, and Peru.

== Taxonomy and systematics ==
The yellow-billed nunbird is monotypic.

== Description ==
The yellow-billed nunbird is 23 to 25 cm (9.1 to 9.8 in) long and weighs about 39 g (1.4 oz). The adult is mostly sooty black, with the belly tending to very dark gray and the tail being greenish black. The lesser wing coverts are mostly white and show as white spots on the closed wing. The bill is yellow and noticeably shorter than those of the other members of its genus. Its eye is dark and the feet blackish. Immatures are a slightly duller black than adults and the white areas are not as prominent.

== Distribution and habitat ==
The yellow-billed nunbird is found in two areas of the upper Amazon Basin. One extends from southeastern Colombia through eastern Ecuador into northern Peru. The other includes eastern Peru, northern Bolivia, and western Brazil as far east as the upper Purus River. The species inhabits somewhat open landscapes such as transitional forest, secondary forest, the edges of terra firme forest, and regenerating clearings with scattered trees. It occurs from the understory to the subcanopy. In Colombia it is typically found in the Andean foothills at up to 1,400 m (4,600 ft) of elevation. In Ecuador is extends locally as high as 750 m (2,500 ft) but is usually below 400 m (1,300 ft).

== Behavior ==
=== Feeding ===
The yellow-billed nunbird's feeding behavior and diet have not been extensively studied. It appears to hunt by sallies from a high exposed perch, catching its prey in the air. Its diet is assumed to be mostly insects like those of other nunbirds.

=== Breeding ===
Nothing has been documented of the yellow-billed nunbird's breeding phenology.

=== Vocalization ===
The yellow-billed nunbird's song "consists of full melodious lengthy phrases in choruses, typically including a frequently repeated 'wheekit-wheeyk, wheekit-wheeyk...'."

== Status ==
The IUCN has assessed the yellow-billed nunbird as being of Least Concern. Though its population has not been enumerated, it is believed to be stable. It is apparently rather rare throughout its range, though it might be undercounted due to its unobtrusive habits.
