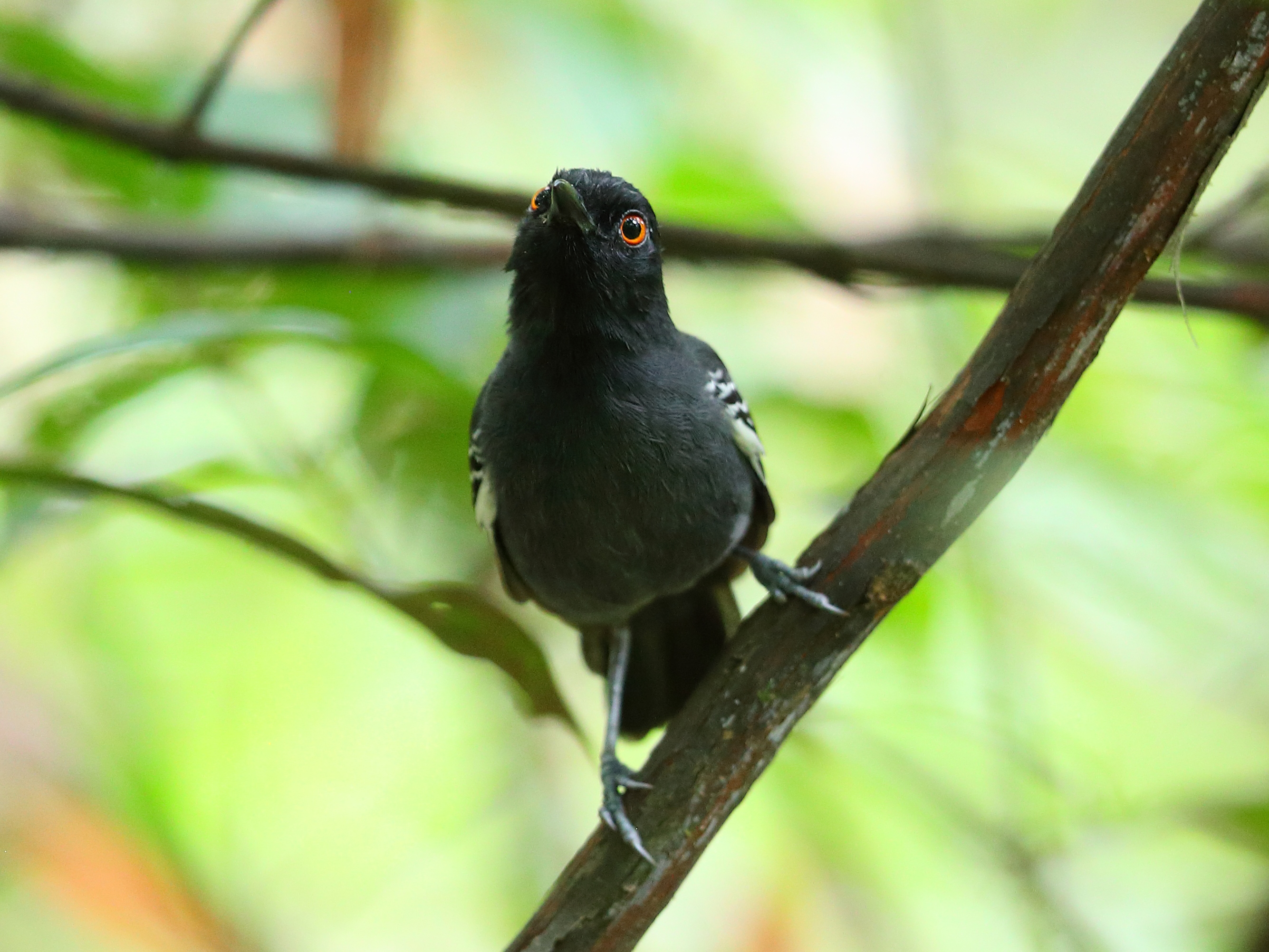

Conservation status
- Near Threatened (IUCN 3.1)

Scientific classification
- Kingdom: Animalia
- Phylum: Chordata
- Class: Aves
- Order: Passeriformes
- Family: Thamnophilidae
- Genus: Myrmoborus
- Species: M. melanurus

Binomial name
- Myrmoborus melanurus (Sclater, PL & Salvin, 1866)

= Black-tailed antbird =

Species of bird

The black-tailed antbird (Myrmoborus melanurus) is a Near Threatened species of bird in subfamily Thamnophilinae of family Thamnophilidae, the "typical antbirds". It is found in Brazil, Colombia, and Peru.

== Taxonomy and systematics ==
The black-tailed antbird was described by the English ornithologists Philip Sclater and Osbert Salvin in 1866 and given the binomial name Hypocmenis melanurus. It was transferred to its present genus Myrmoborus in 1924.

The black-tailed antbird is monotypic. It and the white-lined antbird are sister species.

== Description ==
The black-tailed antbird is 12 to 13 cm (4.7 to 5.1 in) long and weighs an average of about 18 g (0.63 oz). Adult males are mostly very dark gray. Their head, neck, throat, and wing coverts are blackish; the coverts have narrow white tips. Some individuals have a white patch between their scapulars. Adult females have a dull reddish brown crown. Their back and rump are medium brown. Their flight feathers are dusky brown and their wing coverts black with narrow white edges. Their tail feathers are dusky with medium brown edges. Their lores and face are gray. Their throat and underparts are mostly white with a buff band across the breast and buff flanks and crissum. Both sexes have a red iris and blue-gray to gray legs and feet. Males have a black bill; females have a black maxilla and a gray mandible.

== Distribution and habitat ==
The black-tailed antbird is found in the far western Amazon Basin of Peru, Brazil, and Colombia. In Peru it occurs along the upper Amazon and several of its major tributaries in Loreto and Ucayali departments. It crosses extreme southern Colombia and just enters extreme western Brazil's Amazonas state along the Amazon. It inhabits seasonally flooded varzea forest along waterways and oxbow lakes, where it favors dense thickets of vines and other vegetation near the water. In elevation it ranges between 100 and 250 m (330 and 820 ft) above sea level.

== Behavior ==
=== Movement ===
The black-tailed antbird is a year-round resident throughout its range.

=== Feeding ===
The black-tailed antbird feeds on insects though its diet is not known in detail. It typically forages in pairs in dense vegetation, hopping between feeding stops on or near the ground. It is not known to join mixed-species feeding flocks.

=== Breeding ===
The black-tailed antbird's full breeding season is not known but includes July. It builds a globe nest of dried leaves on the ground. Nothing else is known about the species' breeding biology.

=== Vocalization ===
The black-tailed antbird's song is "a moderately paced (4–10 notes/sec), obviously accelerating, descending series of slightly burry notes: djee DJEE-djee-djee-djee-djee'dje'dje'djedjedjr". Its call is "a sharp tchew note" that is sometimes doubled.

== Status ==
The IUCN originally in 1994 assessed the black-tailed antbird as Vulnerable, then in 2004 as Near Threatened, in 2012 again as Vulnerable, and in 2023 again downlisted it as Near Threatened. It has a restricted range, is a habitat specialist, and its population size is not known and is believed to be decreasing. "The species' habitat is under threat from oil exploration and extraction, logging and increasing human colonisation. Large tracts of suitable habitat remain particularly in the northern part of the range, but deforestation is intense along the larger rivers and in east-central Peru." It is considered rare to uncommon. "No specific immediate threats to Black-tailed Antbird, or to varzea forests within its range, have been identified, but generally the Peruvian Amazon currently is under escalating pressure from extractive industries such as oil exploration and extraction, logging, and associated human activities."
