= Rio de Janeiro antwren =

Scientific classification
- Kingdom: Animalia
- Phylum: Chordata
- Class: Aves
- Order: Passeriformes
- Family: Thamnophilidae
- Genus: Myrmotherula
- Species: M. fluminensis

Binomial name
- Myrmotherula fluminensis Gonzaga, 1988

Synonyms
- Myrmotherula luctuosa

Species of bird in Brazil

The Rio de Janeiro antwren (Myrmotherula fluminensis) is a bird in subfamily Thamnophilinae of family Thamnophilidae, the "typical antbirds". It is endemic to Brazil.

== Taxonomy and systematics ==
The Rio de Janeiro antwren is known only from the holotype and a few observations, and its taxonomy is unsettled. The bird's discoverer, the South American Classification Committee of the American Ornithological Society, the International Ornithological Committee, and the Clements taxonomy consider it a full species. BirdLife International's Handbook of the Birds of the World (HBW) does not recognize it as a taxon but as a color morph of the silvery-flanked antwren (M. luctuosa). Other authors have suggested that it could a hybrid between the silvery-flanked antwren and the unicolored antwren (M. unicolor). Gonzaga, who discovered the bird, noted that treating it as a color morph or a hybrid are plausible alternatives to full species status.

== Description ==
The Rio de Janeiro antwren is about 10 cm (3.9 in) long. The type specimen weighed 9 g (0.32 oz). The adult male has a whitish ring around the eye and stripe below it. It has gray upperparts. Its wings are darker gray with white-tipped black coverts. Its tail is gray. Its throat, breast, and center of its belly are black. The rest of its underparts are the same gray as the upperparts. It has a brown iris, a blackish brown bill, and pale bluish gray feet with yellowish soles. The female has not been described.

== Distribution and habitat ==
The holotype of the Rio de Janeiro antwren was collected in 1988 in Brazil's central Rio de Janeiro state. It has not been seen again at that site, and was not seen again anywhere until 1994. Then and since it has been recorded a few times in Reserva Ecológica Guapiaçu (REGUA), which is near the type locality. The holotype was collected in a highly disturbed small woodlot near sea level. The sightings at REGUA have been in secondary forest that is less than 25 years old; the sightings were near old clearings and at elevations between 35 and 200 m (100 and 700 ft).

== Behavior ==
=== Movement ===
The Rio de Janeiro antwren's movement pattern, if any, is not known. The holotype was collected at a site that had been studied for seven years, which prompted speculation by the original author and others that the bird could be a straggler or altitudinal migrant from the nearby Serra dos Órgãos.

=== Feeding ===
The Rio de Janeiro antwren's diet is almost unknown. The holotype's stomach contained the remains of arthropods. The species has been observed feeding with mixed-species foraging flocks, usually within about 2 m (7 ft) of the ground.

=== Breeding ===
Nothing is known about the Rio de Janeiro antwren's breeding biology.

=== Vocalization ===
As of early 2024 neither xeno-canto nor the Cornell Lab of Ornithology's Macaulay Library have recordings of Rio de Janeiro antwren vocalizations. Apparently some have been made, because authors note that the vocalizations are almost or entirely indistinguishable from those of the silvery-flanked antwren.

== Status ==
The IUCN follows HBW taxonomy and so has not assessed the Rio de Janeiro antwren separately from the silvery-flanked antwren.
