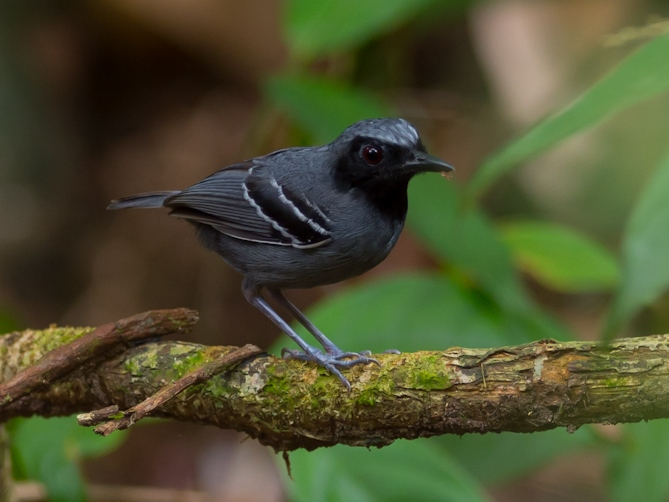
- Male

Conservation status
- Least Concern (IUCN 3.1)

Scientific classification
- Kingdom: Animalia
- Phylum: Chordata
- Class: Aves
- Order: Passeriformes
- Family: Thamnophilidae
- Genus: Myrmoborus
- Species: M. myotherinus

Binomial name
- Myrmoborus myotherinus (Spix, 1825)

= Black-faced antbird =

Species of bird

The black-faced antbird (Myrmoborus myotherinus) is a species of bird in subfamily Thamnophilinae of family Thamnophilidae, the "typical antbirds". It is found in Bolivia, Brazil, Colombia, Ecuador, Peru, and Venezuela.

== Taxonomy and systematics ==
The black-faced antbird was described and illustrated by the German naturalist Johann Baptist von Spix in 1825 and given the binomial name Thamnophilus myotherinus. The specific epithet is from the Ancient Greek muiothēras meaning "flyhunter".

The black-faced antbird has these seven subspecies:

- M. m. elegans (Sclater, PL, 1857)
- M. m. myotherinus (Spix, 1825)
- M. m. incanus Hellmayr, 1929
- M. m. ardesiacus Todd, 1927
- M. m. proximus Todd, 1927
- M. m. ochrolaemus (Hellmayr, 1906)
- M. m. sororius (Hellmayr, 1910)

An eighth subspecies M. m. napensis has been proposed but as of 2024 it is considered to be included within M. m. elegans. Authors have suggested that some of the subspecies might better be treated as full species.

== Description ==
The black-faced antbird is 12 to 13.5 cm (4.7 to 5.3 in) long and weighs 16 to 22 g (0.56 to 0.78 oz). Adult males of the nominate subspecies M. m. myotherinus have a dark bluish gray crown, nape, and upperparts with a small white patch between their scapulars. Their wings and tail are slightly darker gray with white tips on the wing coverts. Their face is mostly black with a pale supercilium. Their throat is black and the rest of their underparts pale gray with slightly darker sides, flanks, and crissum. Adult females have a dark grayish olive-brown crown, nape, and upperparts. Their wings and tail are also mostly dark grayish olive-brown; their wing coverts are black with pale yellowish brown tips. Their face is blackish and their throat white with small black spots at its lower edge. Their underparts are light buff with an olive tinge on the sides, flanks, and crissum. Subadult males have variable amounts of brown mixed in with their gray upperparts, and have brownish edges on their flight feathers and paler underparts than adults. Both sexes have a deep red iris.

The other subspecies of the black-faced antbird are differ from the nominate and each other thus:

- M. m. elegans: male is slightly paler than nominate; female has dark olive-gray upperparts, darker yellow-buff tips on the wing coverts than nominate, and reddish underparts with brown sides and flanks
- M. m. incanus: male like nominate; female has white tips on wing coverts and white underparts with pale ochraceus to tawny-olive flanks and crissum
- M. m. ardesiacus: male has slate-gray upper- and underparts; female has olive-brown upperparts usually with buff tinge on wing covert tips and entire underparts deep ochraceous with white mixed in
- M. m. proximus: male darker overall than nominate; female mostly reddish yellow-brown with few spots on throat
- M. m. ochrolaemus: male paler than nominate with whitish underparts; female has slaty olive upperparts, a rufous-buff supercilium and wing covert spots, and deep yellow-ochre throat and underparts with no spots on the throat
- M. m. sororius: male like nominate; female has pale buff to light ochraceous brown throat and darker underparts than nominate with redder band across the breast and few throat spots

== Distribution and habitat ==
The black-faced antbird occupies much of the Amazon Basin. The subspecies are found thus:

- M. m. elegans: southern Venezuela, extreme northwestern Brazil, and from southeastern Colombia south through eastern Ecuador into central Peru north of the Amazon and west of the Ucayali River
- M. m. myotherinus: eastern Peru east of the Ucayali, Amazonas and Acre states in western Brazil, and northwestern Bolivia
- M. m. incanus: Brazil north of the upper Amazon (Solimões) between the Japurá and Içá rivers
- M. m. ardesiacus: Brazil between the Japura and Negro rivers
- M. m. proximus: Brazil south of the Amazon between the Purus and Madeira rivers
- M. m. ochrolaemus: Brazil south of the Amazon from the Madeira and Roosevelt rivers east to the Atlantic at Marajó Island and south into Mato Grosso state
- M. m. sororius: Rondônia and southeastern Amazonas states in south-central Brazil

The black-faced antbird primarily inhabits the understorey of terra firme evergreen forest; it also occurs in nearby mature secondary woodland, transitional forest, and occasionally in seasonally flooded areas. It favors the dense vegetation regrowing in gaps such as those caused by fallen trees. In elevation it reaches 900 m (3,000 ft) in Brazil and Venezuela, 800 m (2,600 ft) in Colombia, and 1,250 m (4,100 ft) in Peru. In Ecuador it mostly occurs below 700 m (2,300 ft) but locally is found as high as 1,300 m (4,300 ft).

== Behavior ==
=== Movement ===
The black-faced antbird is believed to be a year-round resident throughout its range.

=== Feeding ===
The black-faced antbird's diet is not known in detail but includes insects and spiders. It typically forages singly, in pairs, or in small family groups in dense vegetation, mostly on the ground or within about 2 m (7 ft) of it though occasionally slightly higher. It hops and makes short flights between feeding stops, bobbing its tail and flicking its wings. It captures prey by gleaning, jumping, and lunging from a perch; it also drops to the ground to snatch prey. It regularly attends army ant swarms to capture prey fleeing the ants, but is subordinate to obligate ant-followers. It seldom joins mixed-species feeding flocks.

=== Breeding ===
The black-faced antbird's breeding season has not been fully described but appears to vary geographically with the range of May to February. Its nest was first described in 2003 based on two nests found in Manú National Park, Peru. The domed or oven shaped nests were placed on the ground between thin branches. Each nest had four layers, an inner layer of fine palm fibers, a layer of dry leaves, a structural layer composed of flexible vine stems and an outer layer of dry leaves that made the nest difficult to see. One nest contained a single egg, the other two eggs. The eggs were white with a light dusting of dark purple spots and streaks. They measured either 20 mm × 14 mm (0.79 in × 0.55 in) or 21 mm × 16 mm (0.83 in × 0.63 in). Both parents participated in building the nest, incubating the eggs, and feeding the nestlings. When the nest was threatened by predators one of the parents gave a broken-wing display in order to distract attention away from the nest.

=== Vocalization ===
The song of the nominate black-faced antbird is "a countable series...of evenly spaced, somewhat unclear (frequency-modulated) notes, pitch and intensity rising initially, falling terminally, notes become longer throughout" that has been written as "zree-zree-zree-zrut-zrut". The songs of the other subspecies are similar but vary "in length and shape of notes, pace of song, pattern of peak frequencies of notes, and intensity pattern". That of M. m. elegans has been written as "djzeer DJZEER-djzeer dzjeer dzjeer dzjeer. The species' calls include a "rattle", an "abrupt note", and a "longer downslurred note".

== Status ==
The IUCN has assessed the black-faced antbird as being of Least Concern. It has a very large range; its population size is not known and is believed to be stable. No immediate threats have been identified. It is considered fairly common to common across its range, which contains many large protected areas. Its range also includes "vast areas of intact suitable habitat which, although not formally protected, seem to be at little risk of being developed in near term".
