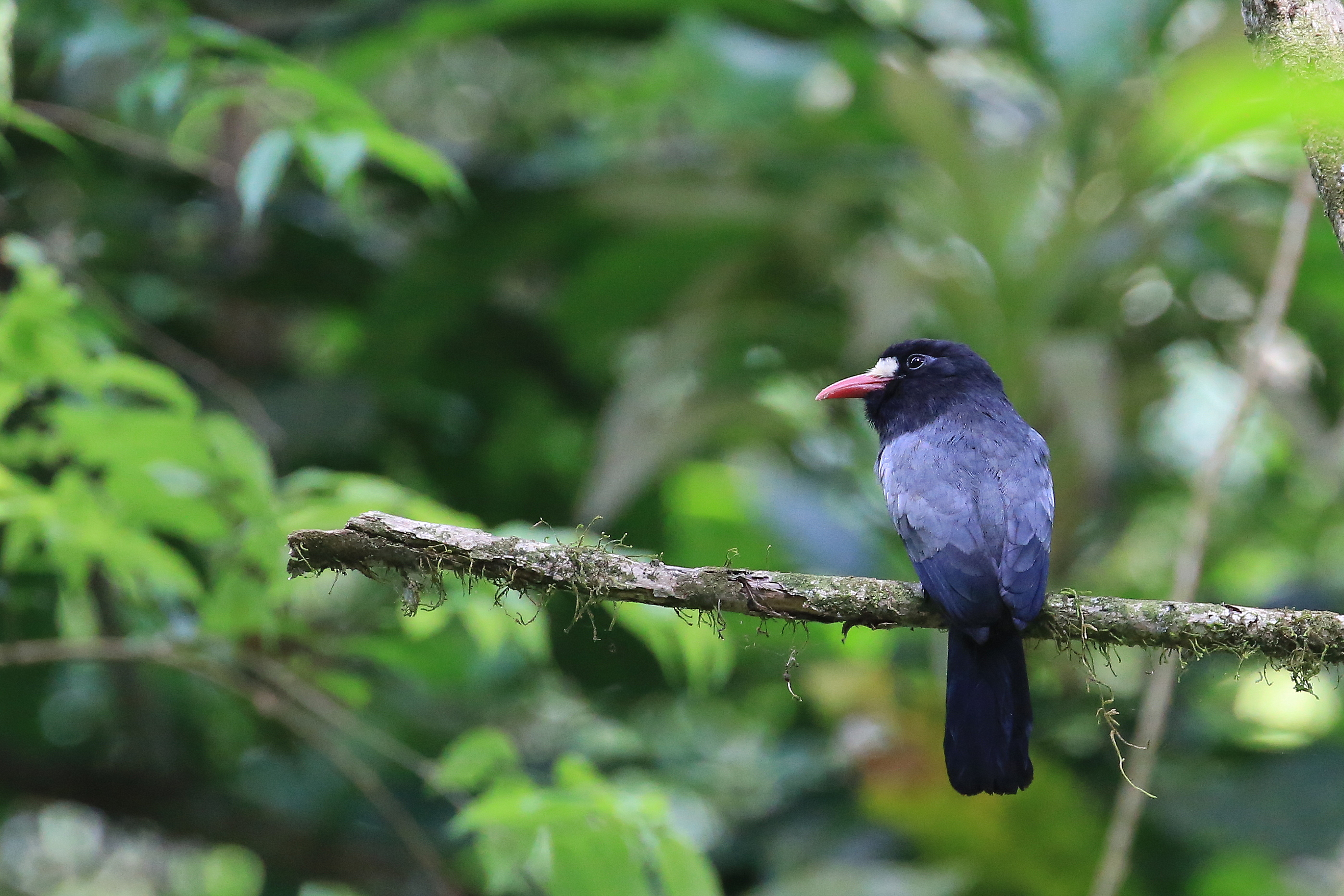

Conservation status
- Least Concern (IUCN 3.1)

Scientific classification
- Kingdom: Animalia
- Phylum: Chordata
- Class: Aves
- Order: Piciformes
- Family: Bucconidae
- Genus: Monasa
- Species: M. morphoeus

Binomial name
- Monasa morphoeus (Hahn & Küster, 1823)

= White-fronted nunbird =

Species of bird

The white-fronted nunbird (Monasa morphoeus) is a species of bird in the family Bucconidae, the puffbirds, nunlets, and nunbirds. It is found Bolivia, Brazil, Colombia, Costa Rica, Ecuador, Honduras, Nicaragua, Panama, Peru, and Venezuela.

== Taxonomy and systematics ==
The white-fronted nunbird is assigned these seven subspecies:

- M. m. grandior PL Sclater & Salvin, 1868
- M. m. fidelis Nelson, 1912
- M. m. pallescens Cassin, 1860
- M. m. sclateri Ridgway, 1912
- M. m. peruana PL Sclater, 1856
- M. m. rikeri Ridgway, 1912
- M. m. morphoeus (Hahn & Küster, 1823)

The first four subspecies were at one time treated as individual species. Other authors included rikeri in the nominate morpheous. Birds in northeastern Bolivia were suggested as a separate subspecies but remain included in peruana. The white-fronted nunbird, black-fronted nunbird (M. nigrifrons), and black nunbird (M. morphoeus) are generally treated as a superspecies.

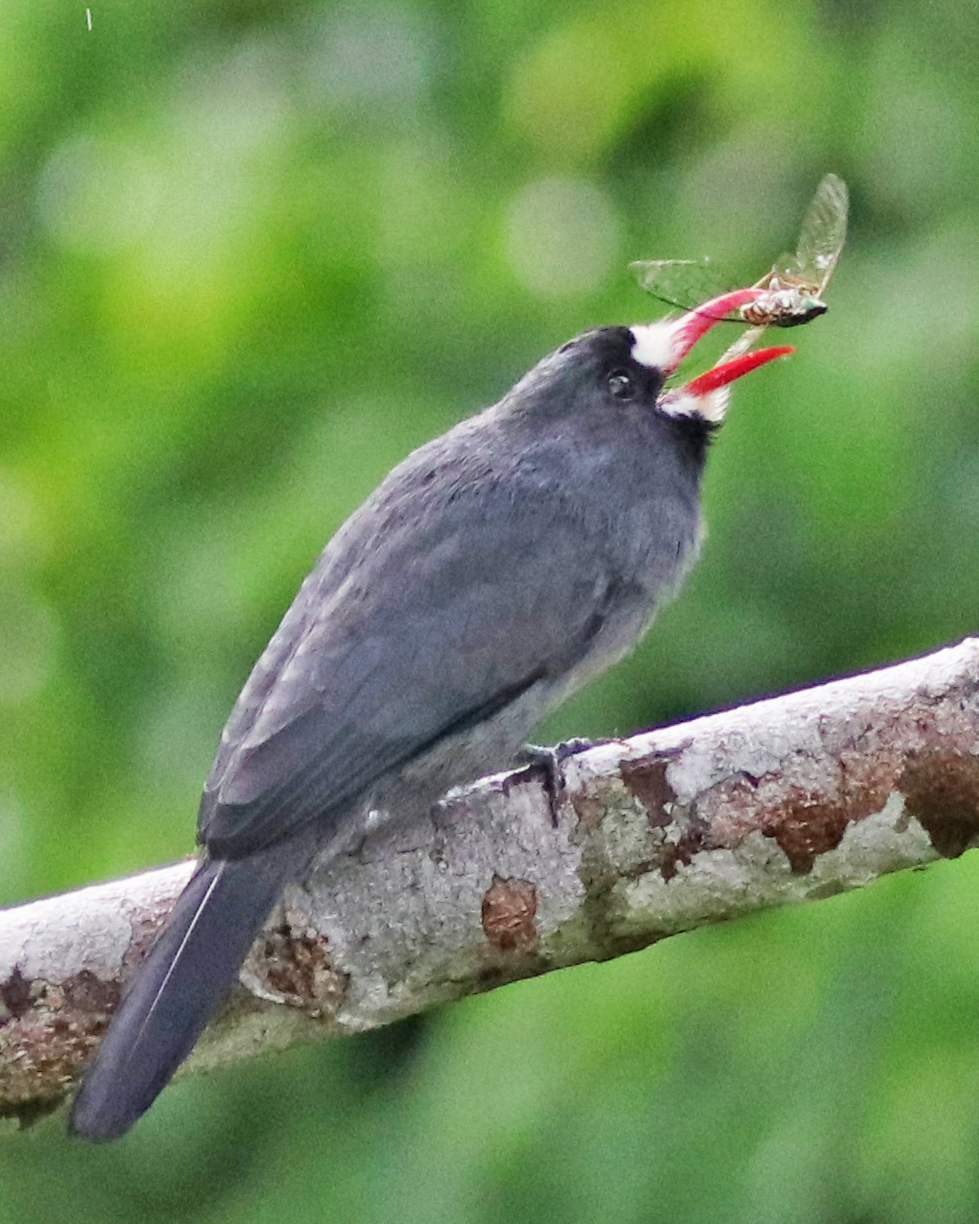
Eating a cicada in eastern Ecuador

== Description ==
The white-fronted nunbird is 21 to 29 cm (8.3 to 11 in) long. Birds in Central America weigh 90 to 101 g (3.2 to 3.6 oz), those in the eastern Amazon 77 to 87 g (2.7 to 3.1 oz), those in Venezuela 63 to 80 g (2.2 to 2.8 oz), and those in Bolivia 80 to 84 g (2.8 to 3.0 oz). The adult of the nominate subspecies is mostly dark grayish black, somewhat grayer on the underparts. Its forehead ("front") and chin are white. Its bill is orange-red, the eye brown, and the legs black. Immatures have a buffy-rufous face and their body feathers have a brownish tinge and edges.

The other subspecies of white-fronted nunbird differ in size, the darkness of their plumage, and the extent of white on the face. Northern birds are larger than southern ones. M. m. sclateri has a black chin, little contrast between the upper- and underparts, and paler wing coverts than the nominate. M. m. pallescens is similar to sclateri but paler overall with more contrast, and the white patch on the forehead is the largest of all subspecies. M. m. fidelis is like pallescens but slightly darker and with a whitish chin. M. m. grandior is slightly darker than fidelis and with little contrast. M. m. rikeri is slightly paler than the nominate and M. m. peruana even paler.

== Distribution and habitat ==
The subspecies of white-fronted nunbird are distributed thus:

- M. m. grandior, eastern Honduras and eastern Nicaragua through eastern Costa Rica into western Panama
- M. m. fidelis, the Caribbean slope of eastern Panama and northwestern Colombia as far east as Córdoba Department
- M. m. pallescens, southeastern Panama into western Colombia as far south as the upper San Juan River
- M. m. sclateri, Colombia's Magdalena Valley including the Serranía de las Quinchas south to northern Tolima Department
- M. m. peruana, eastern Ecuador, southeastern Colombia, and southern Venezuela south through eastern Peru into northeastern Bolivia and east into Amazonian Brazil as far as the Tapajós River
- M. m. rikeri, Amazonian Brazil from the Tapajós east to Maranhão state
- M. m. morphoeus, coastal eastern Brazil from Bahia south to Rio de Janeiro state

The white-fronted nunbird inhabits a variety of wooded landscapes including lowland terra firme, rainforest, and gallery and transitional forest. It also occurs in more open environments like partly deforested areas, shaded cacao plantations, and abandoned clearings with scattered trees. In most of its range it is found below 300 m (980 ft) but reaches 750 m (2,500 ft) in Panama, 1,050 m (3,400 ft) in Peru, and locally 1,350 m (4,400 ft) in Ecuador.

== Behavior ==
=== Feeding ===
The white-fronted nunbird's diet is mostly insects and also includes other arthropods, small lizards and amphibians, and some fruits. It follows troops of primates, army ant swarms, and flocks of caciques and oropendolas to capture prey dislodged by them.

=== Breeding ===
The white-fronted nunbird breeds between December and May in Costa Rica and February to May in Colombia; its nesting season in other parts of its range has not been defined. It nests in a leaf-lined chamber at the end of a tunnel excavated in level or sloping ground. The clutch of two or three eggs and the young are attended by up to six adults.

=== Vocalization ===
The white-fronted nunbird has a variety of vocalizations. Examples are "a blurred descending whistle with short rippling trill, 'peeeur-r-r-r-r'; also a loud, mournful 'how how how' and various rippling trills, churrs and rattles" and "group choruses of loud gobbling, barking notes".

== Status ==
The IUCN has assessed the white-fronted nunbird as being of Least Concern. It has a very large range and a population of at least five million mature individuals, though the latter is decreasing. Its density varies from uncommon to abundant in various parts of its range.

== Gallery ==
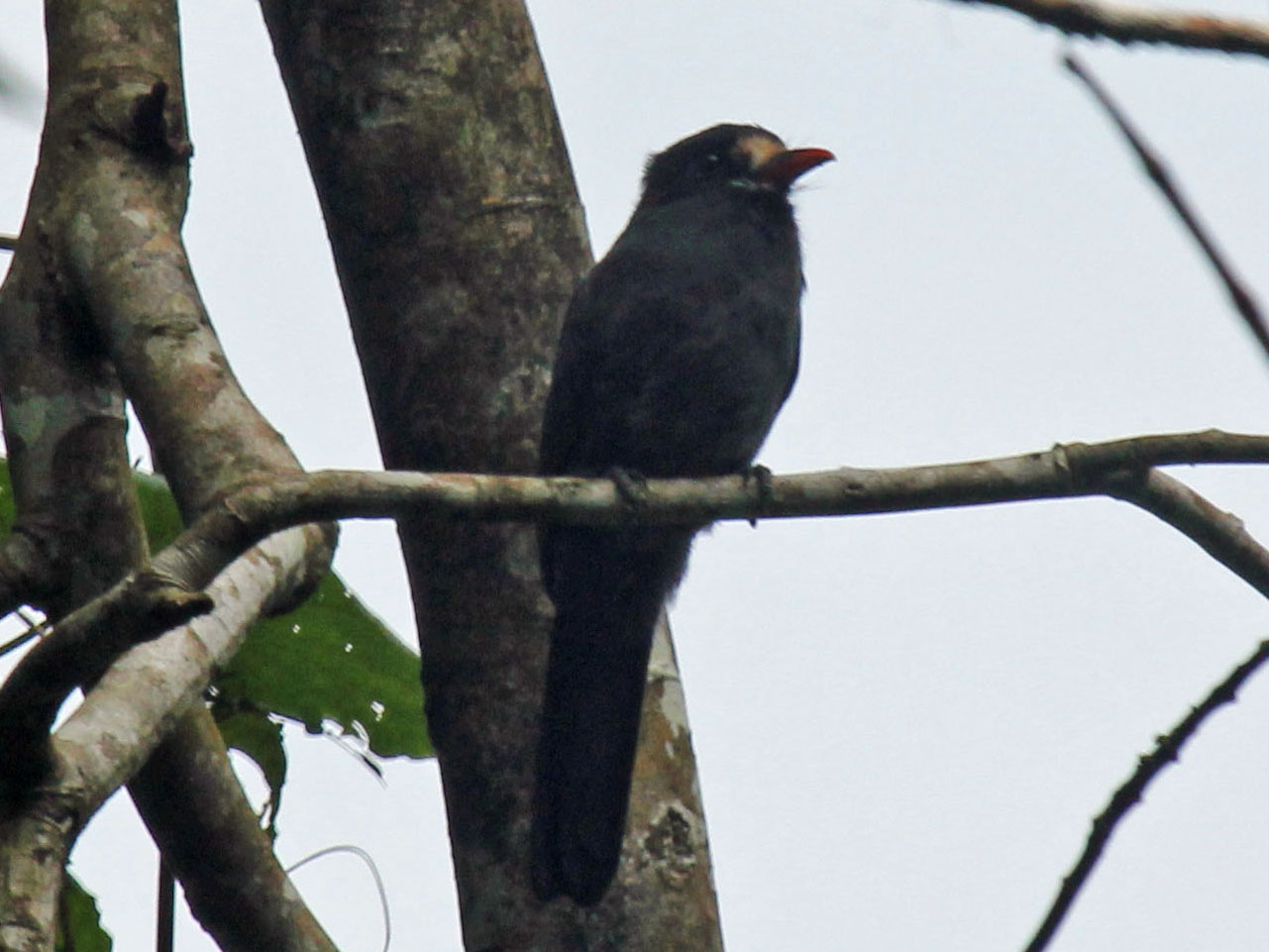
