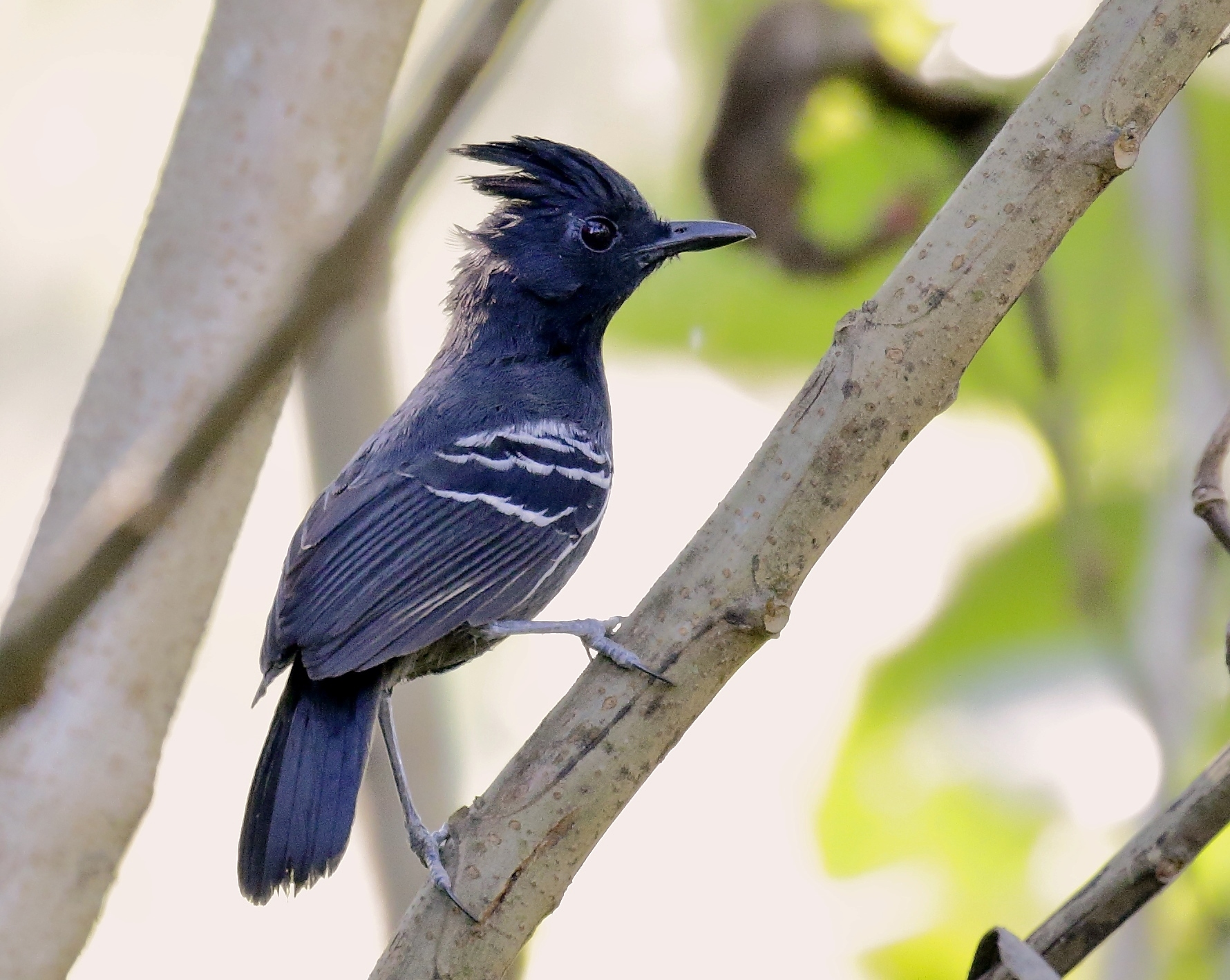
- Male at Rio Branco, Acre, Brazil.

Conservation status
- Least Concern (IUCN 3.1)

Scientific classification
- Kingdom: Animalia
- Phylum: Chordata
- Class: Aves
- Order: Passeriformes
- Family: Thamnophilidae
- Genus: Myrmoborus
- Species: M. lophotes

Binomial name
- Myrmoborus lophotes (Hellmayr & Seilern, 1914)

Synonyms
- Percnostola lophotes

= White-lined antbird =

Species of bird

The white-lined antbird (Myrmoborus lophotes) is a species of bird in subfamily Thamnophilinae of family Thamnophilidae, the "typical antbirds". It is found in Bolivia, Brazil, and Peru.

== Taxonomy and systematics ==
The white-lined antbird has a complicated taxonomic history. It was originally described in 1914 as Percnostola lophotes. Some later authors placed it in genus Myrmeciza, a treatment that did not gain wide acceptance. The specimen from which the original description was made is apparently a subadult male whose plumage is similar to an adult female's. A later specimen of an adult male bird was initially described as a new species, Percnostola macrolopha, but in 1982 it was confirmed to be the same species as the original Percnostola lophotes. Several early twentieth century studies determined that the white-lined antbird did not belong to genus Percnostola, and a genetic study published in 2013 found that it is embedded within Myrmoborus.

The white-lined antbird is monotypic.

== Description ==
The white-lined antbird is 14 to 14.5 cm (5.5 to 5.7 in) long and weighs 28 to 31 g (0.99 to 1.1 oz). Both sexes have a prominent crest. Adult males are mostly blackish gray, with their head and breast being the darkest and their flanks the lightest shades. They have a white patch between their scapulars. Their outermost primaries have a narrow white edge and their wing coverts have white tips. Adult females have a cinnamon-rufous crown. Their upperparts, wings, and tail are reddish yellow-brown with cinnamon-rufous edges on the wing coverts. Their face is grayish. Their throat and underparts are mostly white with a gray tinge across the breast and a cinnamon-olive tinge on their sides, flanks, and crissum. Subadult males resemble adult females.

== Distribution and habitat ==
The white-lined antbird is found in southeastern Peru from the Department of Ucayali south to the Department of Puno, in adjoining far western Acre state of Brazil, and in northwestern Bolivia's Pando and La Paz departments. It inhabits the floor and understorey of várzea and transitional forest along rivers. It almost entirely frequents dense stands of Guadua bamboo there and also somewhat above the floodplain. Away from bamboo it is found in dense stands of Heliconia and Costus. In elevation it mostly occurs below 750 m (2,500 ft) but locally is found as high as 1,450 m (4,800 ft) (to 1,350 m (4,400 ft) in Peru).

== Behavior ==
=== Movement ===
The white-lined antbird is believed to be a year-round resident throughout its range.

=== Feeding ===
The white-lined antbird's diet is not known in detail but includes insects and probably spiders. It typically forages singly, in pairs, or in small family groups in dense vegetation, mostly on the ground or within about 1 m (3 ft) of it though occasionally as high as about 8 m (25 ft). It hops between feeding stops, raising and lowering its crest and bobbing its tail. It captures prey by reaching to leaves, vines, and branches and by vigorously rooting through leaf litter. It has been observed attending an army ant swarm to capture prey fleeing the ants. It seldom joins mixed-species feeding flocks.

=== Breeding ===
Nothing is known about the white-lined antbird's breeding biology.

=== Vocalization ===
The white-lined antbird's song is "a descending, accelerating series of hollow whistles, with a noticeably long space between the first note and the rest of the song: TEW tew-tew-tew'tew'tew'tu'tutu". Its call is "a hollow, musical chew note" that is often followed by "a growled reeh".

== Status ==
The IUCN originally in 2004 assessed the white-lined antbird as being of Least Concern, then in 2012 as Near Threatened, and in 2020 again as of Least Concern. It has a somewhat restricted range; its estimated population of at least 500,000 mature individuals is believed to be decreasing. "The principal threat to the species is forest loss...however, large tracts of forests within the range are protected in national parks and reserves." "Continued protection of these existing parks and reserves should ensure the survival of viable populations of this antbird."
