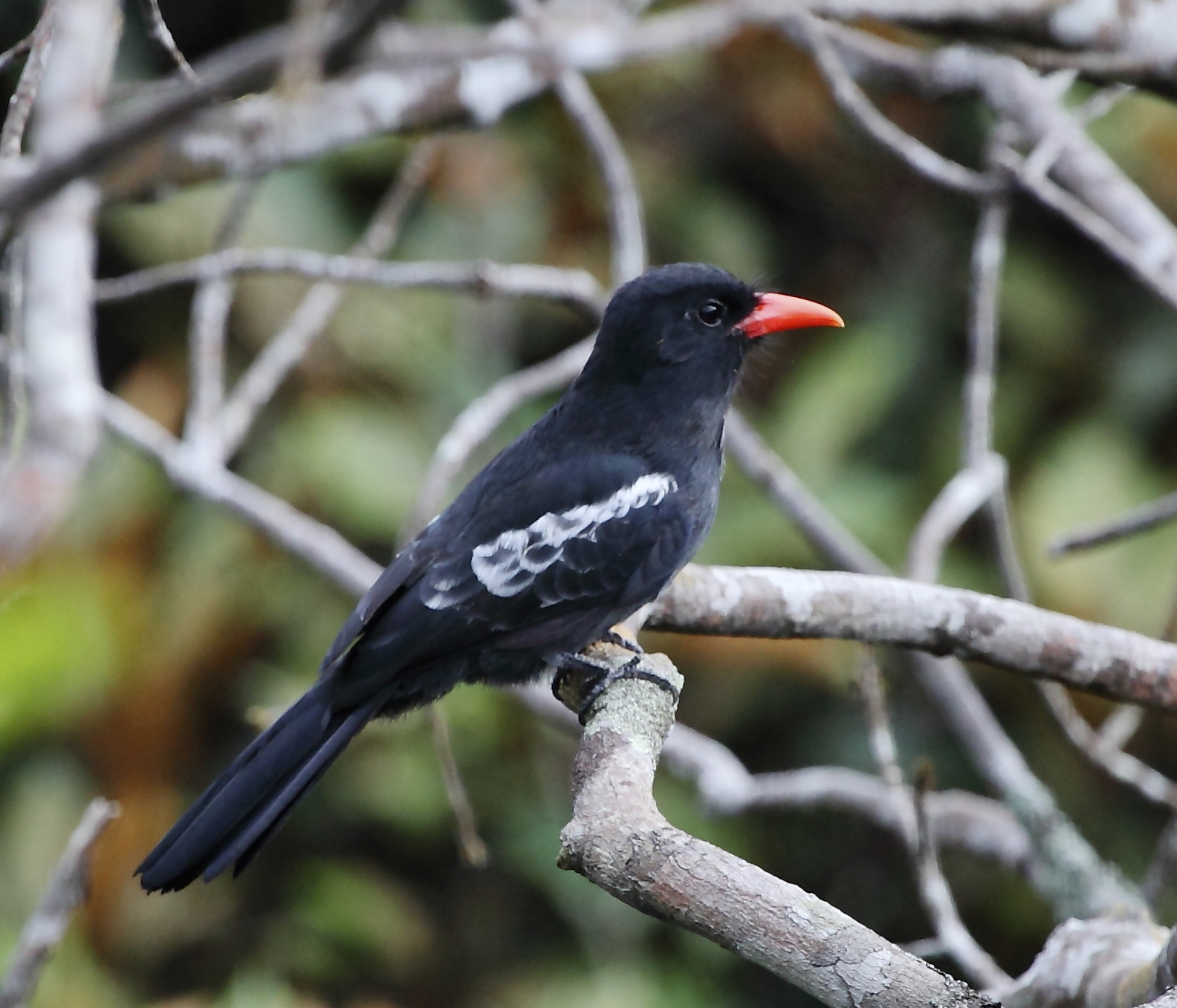
- Black nunbird at Manaus, Amazonas state, Brazil

Conservation status
- Least Concern (IUCN 3.1)

Scientific classification
- Kingdom: Animalia
- Phylum: Chordata
- Class: Aves
- Order: Piciformes
- Family: Bucconidae
- Genus: Monasa
- Species: M. atra

Binomial name
- Monasa atra (Boddaert, 1783)

= Black nunbird =

Species of bird

The black nunbird (Monasa atra) is a species of bird in the family Bucconidae, the puffbirds, nunlets, and nunbirds. It is found in Brazil, French Guiana, Guyana, Suriname, and Venezuela.

== Taxonomy and systematics ==
The black nunbird was described by the French polymath Georges-Louis Leclerc, Comte de Buffon in 1780 in his Histoire Naturelle des Oiseaux from a specimen collected in Cayenne, French Guiana. The bird was also illustrated in a hand-colored plate engraved by François-Nicolas Martinet in the Planches Enluminées D'Histoire Naturelle that was produced under the supervision of Edme-Louis Daubenton to accompany Buffon's text. Neither the plate caption nor Buffon's description included a scientific name but in 1783 the Dutch naturalist Pieter Boddaert coined the binomial name Calculus ater in his catalogue of the Planches Enluminées. The black nunbird is now placed in the genus Monasa that was introduced by the French ornithologist Louis Pierre Vieillot in 1816. The generic name is from the Ancient Greek monas meaning "solitary". The specific epithet atra is from the Latin ater meaning "black".

The black nunbird is monotypic. Some authors treat it, the black-fronted nunbird (M. nigrifrons) and the white-fronted nunbird (M. morphoeus) as a superspecies.

== Description ==
The black nunbird is 25 to 29 cm (9.8 to 11 in) long and weighs 74 to 104 g (2.6 to 3.7 oz). The adult's upperparts are glossy blue-black and the underparts dark gray to light gray. The lesser coverts are white, showing as a wide white band on the closed wing. The bill is red, the eye red to brown, and the legs and feet slaty black. Immatures are sootier above and browner below than the adult.

== Distribution and habitat ==
The black nunbird is found from southern and eastern Venezuela through the Guianas into Brazil, where it occurs north of the Amazon River and east of the Rio Negro. It possibly also occurs in extreme eastern Colombia, though that has not been confirmed by the South American Classification Committee of the American Ornithological Society (SACC). It inhabits humid terra firme, gallery, and várzea forest, usually at the edges, near water, and in somewhat open landscapes. It can be seen at all levels of the forest from the understory to the canopy. In elevation it ranges from sea level to 1,000 m (3,300 ft).

== Behavior ==
=== Feeding ===
The black nunbird hunts by sallies from a perch, usually plucking prey from vegetation or limbs though sometimes taking it in flight. Its diet includes insects, spiders, and other invertebrates as well as small vertebrates such as lizards. It follows army ant swarms.

=== Breeding ===
The black nunbird breeds between March and May in Venezuela and August to September in French Guiana. In the region of Manaus, Brazil, it apparently nests twice each year. The nest is placed in a hole in level ground.

=== Vocalization ===
The black nunbird's songs are a "[f]lute-like 'whoo-doo-doo' and descending 'hyoo-hoo-hoo-oo-oo-oo'". Calls include a "loud 'yawkl-diddl' or 'quee-didada'".

== Status ==
The IUCN has assessed the black nunbird as being of Least Concern. It has a very large range, and though its population has not been enumerated it is believed to be stable. It is considered common in most of its range.
