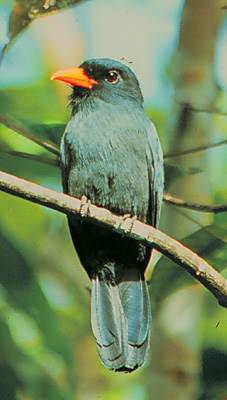
- Black-fronted nunbird (Monasa nigrifrons)

Scientific classification
- Kingdom: Animalia
- Phylum: Chordata
- Class: Aves
- Order: Piciformes
- Family: Bucconidae
- Genus: Monasa; Vieillot, 1816

Type species
- Cuculus ater Boddaert, 1783

Species
- See text

= Monasa =

Genus of birds

Monasa is a genus of puffbirds in the Bucconidae family.

The genus was described by the French ornithologist Louis Pierre Vieillot in 1816 with the black nunbird (Monasa atra) as the type species. The generic name is from the Ancient Greek monas meaning "solitary".

The genus contains four species:

Genus Monasa – Vieillot, 1816 – four species
Common name	Scientific name and subspecies	Range	Size and ecology	IUCN status and estimated population
Black nunbird	Monasa atra (Boddaert, 1783)	North-central South America in the Guianas of Guyana, Suriname and French Guiana including the Guiana Shield; also eastern and southeastern Venezuela in the eastern Orinoco River Basin, and the Amazon Basin of northeast Brazil in the north-central and northeast	Size: Habitat: Diet:	LC
Yellow-billed nunbird	Monasa flavirostris Strickland, 1850	Bolivia, Brazil, Colombia, Ecuador, and Peru	Size: Habitat: Diet:	LC
White-fronted nunbird	Monasa morphoeus (Hahn & Küster, 1823) Seven subspecies: M. m. grandior PL Sclater & Salvin, 1868; M. m. fidelis Nelson, 1912; M. m. pallescens Cassin, 1860; M. m. sclateri Ridgway, 1912; M. m. peruana PL Sclater, 1856; M. m. rikeri Ridgway, 1912; M. m. morphoeus (Hahn & Küster, 1823)	Brazil, Bolivia, Colombia, Ecuador, Peru, and Venezuela; in southern Central America in Honduras, Nicaragua, Costa Rica, and Panama	Size: Habitat: Diet:	LC
Black-fronted nunbird	Monasa nigrifrons (Spix, 1824) Two subspecies: M. n. nigrifrons; M. n. canescens	Bolivia, Brazil, Colombia, Ecuador, and Peru	Size: Habitat: Diet:	LC
