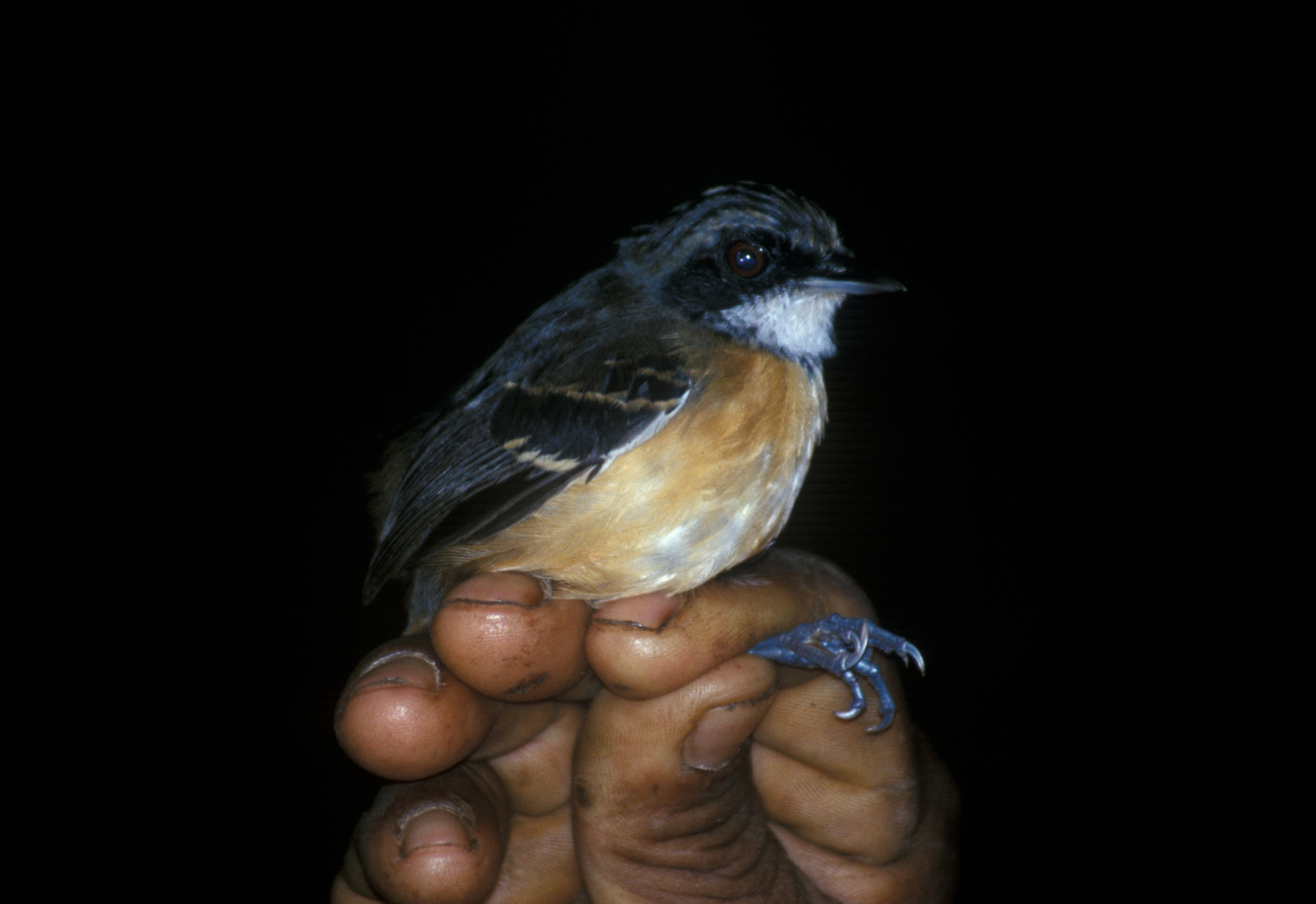
- Black-faced antbird (Myrmoborus myotherinus)

Scientific classification
- Kingdom: Animalia
- Phylum: Chordata
- Class: Aves
- Order: Passeriformes
- Family: Thamnophilidae
- Genus: Myrmoborus; Cabanis & Heine, 1860

Type species
- Pithys leucophrys Tschudi, 1844

= Myrmoborus =

Genus of birds

Myrmoborus is a genus of passerine birds in the antbird family, Thamnophilidae.

The genus was erected by the German ornithologists Jean Cabanis and Ferdinand Heine in 1860 with the white-browed antbird as the type species. The genus name is a combination of two Greek words: murmos, meaning "ant" and -boros (from "bibros"), meaning "-devouring".

The genus contains five species:

Image	Common name	Scientific name	Distribution
	White-browed antbird	Myrmoborus leucophrys	Amazonia
	Ash-breasted antbird	Myrmoborus lugubris	banks of the Amazon river
	Black-tailed antbird	Myrmoborus melanurus	banks of upper Amazon river
	Black-faced antbird	Myrmoborus myotherinus	Amazonia
	White-lined antbird	Myrmoborus lophotes	southwestern Amazonia

The white-lined antbird was previously placed in the genus Percnostola but a genetic study published in 2013 found that it is embedded within Myrmoborus.
