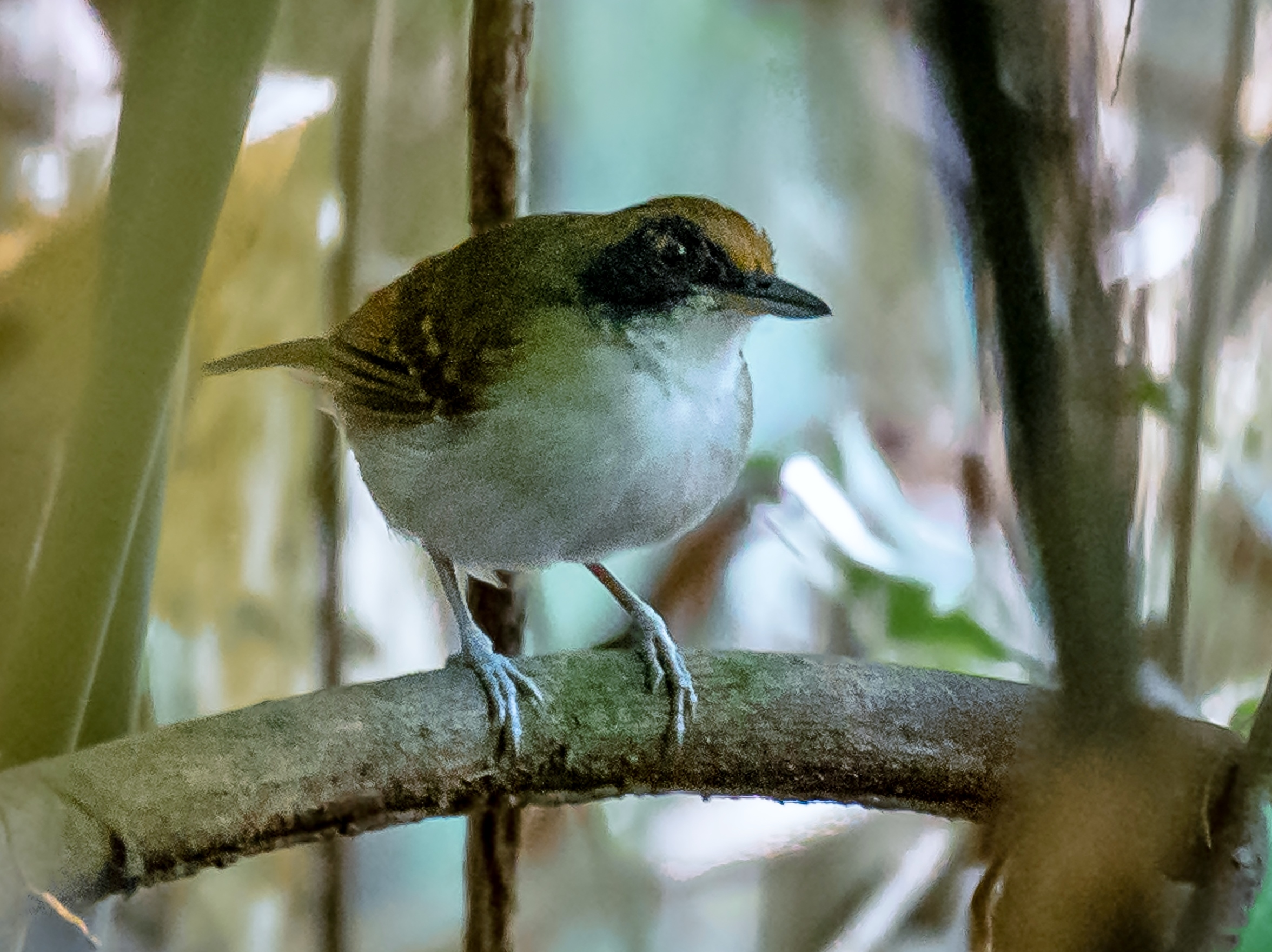
- Female (subspecies stictopterus) at Anavilhanas National Park, Novo Airão, Amazonas, Brazil

Conservation status
- Least Concern (IUCN 3.1)

Scientific classification
- Kingdom: Animalia
- Phylum: Chordata
- Class: Aves
- Order: Passeriformes
- Family: Thamnophilidae
- Genus: Myrmoborus
- Species: M. lugubris

Binomial name
- Myrmoborus lugubris (Cabanis, 1847)

= Ash-breasted antbird =

Species of bird

The ash-breasted antbird (Myrmoborus lugubris) is an insectivorous bird in subfamily Thamnophilinae of family Thamnophilidae, the "typical antbirds". It is found in Brazil, Colombia, Ecuador, and Peru.

== Taxonomy and systematics ==
The ash-breasted antbird was described by the German ornithologist Jean Cabanis in 1847 and given the binomial name Myrmonax lugubris. Its current genus Myrmoborus was introduced in 1860.

The ash-breasted antbird has these four subspecies:

- M. l. berlepschi (Hellmayr, 1910)
- M. l. stictopterus Todd, 1927
- M. l. femininus (Hellmayr, 1910)
- M. l. lugubris (Cabanis, 1847)

== Description ==
The ash-breasted antbird is 12 to 13.5 cm (4.7 to 5.3 in) long and weighs 20 to 23 g (0.71 to 0.81 oz). Adult males of the nominate subspecies M. l. lugubris have mostly gray upperparts with a whitish forehead. Their face and throat are black. Their underparts are grayish white. Adult females have mostly rufescent-tinged brown upperparts, wings, and tail with small buff tips on their wing coverts. Their throat is white and the rest of their underparts are mostly whitish with olivaceous flanks. Both sexes have a red iris and gray legs and feet. Males have a black bill; females have a black maxilla and a gray mandible.

The males of the others subspecies are like the nominate male. Females of subspecies M. l. femininus have black lores and ear coverts and more rufescent upperparts than the nominate. Females of M. l. stictopterus have upperparts intermediate between the nominate and femininus and paler underparts than both. Females of M. l. berlepschi have more olive upperparts than the other subspecies, their white throat has a thin band of black speckles below it, and their belly is somewhat grayer than the others'.

== Distribution and habitat ==
The ash-breasted antbird is found along the Amazon river and some of its major tributaries. The subspecies occur thus:

- M. l. berlepschi: along the Rio Napo from extreme eastern Orellana Province in Ecuador through Peru's Loreto Department to the upper Amazon (Solimões River), along the Marañón and Ucayali rivers in Peru to their confluences with the Amazon, and along the Amazon in Peru, along the Peru/Colombia border, and into western Brazil to about the municipality of Tonantins
- M. l. stictopterus: Brazil on the lower Branco River, the lower Negro River, and along the upper Amazon between them
- M. l. femininus: Brazil along the lower Madeira River
- M. l. lugubris: Brazil along the Amazon from the Madeira east to Guajará Bay on the Atlantic

As of 2001 M. l. berlepschi was known in Ecuador from only one island near the Peruvian border.

The ash-breasted antbird is found almost exclusively on river islands, usually those with somewhat mature forest and dense undergrowth. It also occurs in várzea along the riverbanks.

== Behavior ==
=== Movement ===
The ash-breasted antbird is a year-round resident throughout its range.

=== Feeding ===
The ash-breasted antbird's diet has not been detailed but is known to include insects and spiders. It typically forages singly or in pairs in dense vegetation, mostly within about 1.5 m (5 ft) of the ground and only rarely higher. It hops and makes short flights between feeding stops, bobbing its tail. It captures prey by gleaning, jumping, lunging, and making short sallies from a perch. It sometimes loosely associates with other river island insectivores.

=== Breeding ===
The one known nest of the ash-breasted antbird was a dome of dead leaves, leaf skeletons, and a few twigs on the ground among low plants and mossy logs. Nothing else is known about the species' breeding biology.

=== Vocalization ===
The song of the ash-breasted antbird's subspecies M. l. berlepschi is "a moderate and even-paced (about 5 notes/sec), descending series of slightly hoarse notes: JEE-JEE-jee-jee-jee-jee-jee-jee-jee-jer". Its calls are "a rapid, descending, metallic, sputtering chatter: pt'rr'rr'rr and a quiet pew note, sometimes doubled". The other subspecies' vocalizations are thought to be similar.

== Status ==
The IUCN originally in 2004 assessed the ash-breasted antbird as being of Least Concern, then in 2012 as Vulnerable, and in 2023 again as of Least Concern. It is a habitat specialist and its population size is not known and is believed to be decreasing. "The primary threat to this species is accelerating deforestation in the Amazon basin, as land is cleared for agricultural production...Moreover, changes in flooding patterns and flow regime caused by deforestation, the construction of river dams or global climate change, could have serious effects on the species." It is considered locally fairly common in much of its range and common in Peru in appropriate habitat. "Human activity has little short-term direct effect on the Ash-breasted Antbird, other than the local effects of habitat destruction. In the longer term, the Ash-breasted Antbird potentially is vulnerable to widespread habitat loss, as might occur through perturbations of the Amazonian hydrological regime stemming from widespread deforestation, dam construction, or global climate change."
