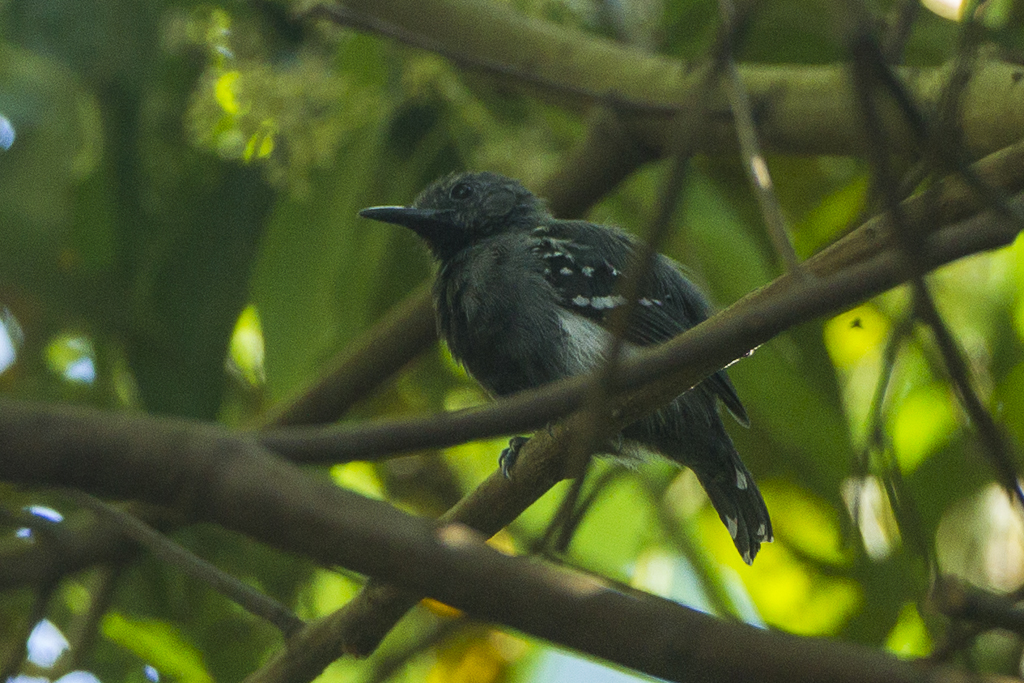

Conservation status
- Least Concern (IUCN 3.1)

Scientific classification
- Kingdom: Animalia
- Phylum: Chordata
- Class: Aves
- Order: Passeriformes
- Family: Thamnophilidae
- Genus: Myrmotherula
- Species: M. luctuosa

Binomial name
- Myrmotherula luctuosa Pelzeln, 1868

= Silvery-flanked antwren =

Species of bird in Brazil

The silvery-flanked antwren (Myrmotherula luctuosa) is an insectivorous bird in subfamily Thamnophilinae of family Thamnophilidae, the "typical antbirds". It is endemic to Brazil.

== Taxonomy and systematics ==
The silvery-flanked antwren was described by the Austrian ornithologist August von Pelzeln in 1868 and given its current binomial name Myrmotherula luctuosa.

Since its initial description, the white-flanked antwren's taxonomy is unsettled. The International Ornithological Committee (IOC) and BirdLife International's Handbook of the Birds of the World treat it as Pelzeln did, as a monotypic species. However, the North and South American Classification Committees of the American Ornithological Society and the Clements taxonomy consider it a subspecies of the white-flanked antwren (M. axillaris).

== Description ==
The silvery-flanked antwren is 9 to 10 cm (3.5 to 3.9 in) long. It is a smallish bird with a short tail. Adult males have a medium gray head, neck, back, and rump with a hidden white patch between the shoulders. Their tail is blackish with large white tips to the feathers. Their wings are blackish with white tips on the coverts and gray edges on the flight feathers. Their throat, breast, and the center of their belly are blackish, their flanks pale gray, and their crissum gray with black and white tips on the feathers. Adult females have an ashy gray head. Their upperparts are gray with an olive tinge. Their tail feathers are dark brown with light cinnamon-rufous edges. Their wings are dark brown with pale buff edges on the coverts and light cinnamon-rufous edges on the flight feathers. Their underparts are ochraceous.

== Distribution and habitat ==
The silvery-flanked antwren is found in coastal eastern Brazil from southern Rio Grande do Norte south to Rio de Janeiro state. It inhabits the understorey to mid-storey of evergreen forest and secondary woodland (including restinga). In elevation it occurs from sea level to about 800 m (2,600 ft).

== Behavior ==
=== Movement ===
The silvery-flanked antwren is believed to be a year-round resident throughout its range.

=== Feeding ===
The silvery-flanked antwren's diet is not known in detail but is probably mostly insects and spiders. It forages singly, in pairs, or in family groups, and often as part of a mixed-species feeding flock. It typically forages in dense vegetation between about 2 and 12 m (7 and 40 ft) above the ground. It actively seeks prey in clusters of dead leaves by pecking them rather than probing. It also takes prey from live leaves, vine tangles, and along branches.

=== Breeding ===
The silvery-flanked antwren's breeding season is not well known but appears to span from July to January. Its nest is unknown but is assumed to be similar to that of the white-flanked antwren, which see here. Nothing else is known about the species' breeding biology.

=== Vocalization ===
The silvery-flanked antwren's song "begins and ends with short harsh...notes, middle ones become longer and clearer, pace slows then speeds up, intensity increases then decreases, pitch is flat and notes countable". One call is a "short, mostly downslurred note, singly or sometimes repeated". Other calls are similar to those of the white-flanked antwren, which see here.

== Status ==
The IUCN has assessed the silvery-flanked antwren as being of Least Concern. It has a somewhat restricted range and its unknown population size is believed to be decreasing. No immediate threats have been identified. It is considered fairly common to common and occurs in several protected areas. However, its "relatively small range and the overall regional level of deforestation argue against complacence".
