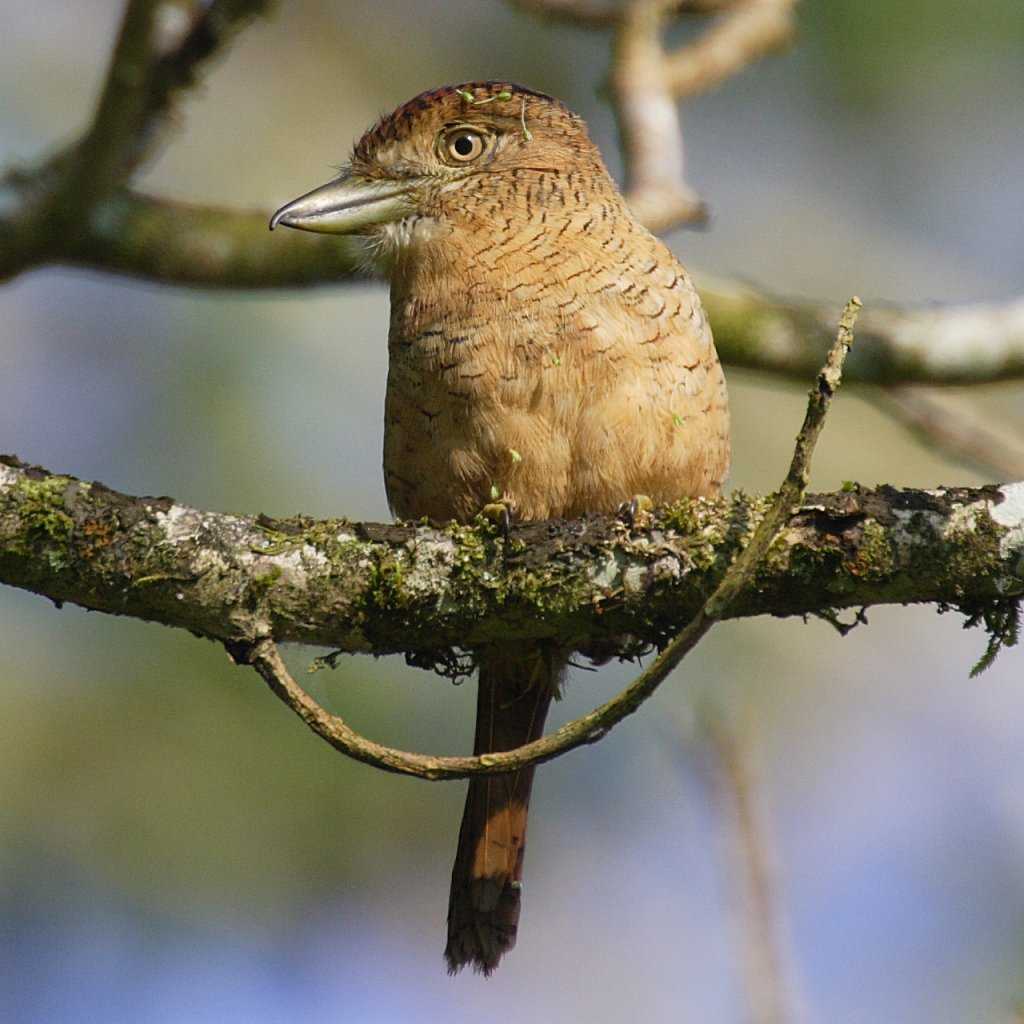
- Barred puffbird, (Nystalus radiatus)

Scientific classification
- Kingdom: Animalia
- Phylum: Chordata
- Class: Aves
- Order: Piciformes
- Suborder: Galbuli; Vigors, 1825

Families
- Bucconidae; Galbulidae

Synonyms
- Galbuliformes Fürbringer, 1888 Galbulae Vigors, 1825

= Galbuli =

Suborder of birds

Galbuli is one of the two suborders of the order Piciformes. It includes two families, Bucconidae (puffbirds) and Galbulidae (jacamars), both restricted to the Neotropics (in contrast to the more widespread suborder Pici).

== Systematics ==
It was thought the jacamars and puffbirds were not closely related to toucans and woodpeckers, but instead related to the order Coraciiformes. However, analysis of nuclear DNA in a 2003 study placed them as sister group to Pici, also showing that the groups had developed zygodactyl feet (two toes facing forward and two aft) before separating. Per Ericson and colleagues, in analysing genomic DNA, confirmed that puffbirds and jacamars were sister groups and their place in Piciformes. The lineage is sometimes elevated to order level as Galbuliformes, first proposed by Sibley and Ahlquist in 1990.

=== Taxonomy ===
The following arrangement of taxa is based on Witt (2004).

- Suborder Galbuli
  - Family Bucconidae
    - Genus Nonnula
      - Rusty-breasted nunlet, Nonnula rubecula
      - Rufous-capped nunlet, Nonnula ruficapilla
      - Chestnut-headed nunlet, Nonnula amaurocephala
      - Grey-cheeked nunlet, Nonnula frontalis
      - Fulvous-chinned nunlet, Nonnula sclateri
      - Brown nunlet, Nonnula brunnea
    - Genus Malacoptila
      - White-chested puffbird, Malacoptila fusca
      - Semicollared puffbird, Malacoptila semicincta
      - Crescent-chested puffbird, Malacoptila striata
      - Black-streaked puffbird, Malacoptila fulvogularis
      - Rufous-necked puffbird, Malacoptila rufa
      - White-whiskered puffbird, Malacoptila panamensis
      - Moustached puffbird, Malacoptila mystacalis
    - Genus Bucco
      - Collared puffbird, Bucco capensis
    - Genus Nystalus
      - Spot-backed puffbird, Nystalus maculatus
      - Barred puffbird, Nystalus radiatus
      - Western striolated puffbird, Nystalus obamai
      - Eastern striolated puffbird, Nystalus striolatus
      - White-eared puffbird, Nystalus chacuru
    - Genus Chelidoptera
      - Swallow-winged puffbird, Chelidoptera tenebrosa
    - Genus Monasa
      - White-fronted nunbird, Monasa morphoeus
      - Yellow-billed nunbird, Monasa flavirostris
      - Black-fronted nunbird, Monasa nigrifrons
      - Black nunbird, Monasa atra
    - Genus Hapaloptila
      - White-faced nunbird, Hapaloptila castanea
    - Genus Micromonacha
      - Lanceolated monklet, Micromonacha lanceolata
    - Genus Cyphos
      - Chestnut-capped puffbird, Cyphos macrodactylus
    - Genus Hypnelus
      - Russet-throated puffbird, Hypnelus ruficollis
    - Genus Nystactes
      - Spotted puffbird, Nystactes tamatia
      - Sooty-capped puffbird, Nystactes noanamae
    - Genus Notharchus
      - Brown-banded puffbird, Notharchus ordii
      - Pied puffbird, Notharchus tectus
      - Black-breasted puffbird, Notharchus pectoralis
      - White-necked puffbird, Notharchus hyperrynchus
      - Guianan puffbird, Notharchus macrorhynchos
      - Buff-bellied puffbird, Notharchus swainsoni
  - Family Galbulidae
    - Genus: Jacamaralcyon
      - Three-toed jacamar, Jacamaralcyon tridactyla
    - Genus Brachygalba
      - Dusky-backed jacamar, Brachygalba salmoni
      - Pale-headed jacamar, Brachygalba goeringi
      - Brown jacamar, Brachygalba lugubris
      - White-throated jacamar, Brachygalba albogularis
    - Genus Jacamerops
      - Great jacamar, Jacamerops aureus
    - Genus Galbalcyrhynchus
      - White-eared jacamar, Galbalcyrhynchus leucotis
      - Purus jacamar, Galbalcyrhynchus purusianus
    - Genus Galbula
      - Yellow-billed jacamar, Galbula albirostris
      - Blue-necked jacamar, Galbula cyanicollis
      - Rufous-tailed jacamar, Galbula ruficauda
      - Coppery-chested jacamar, Galbula pastazae
      - Green-tailed jacamar, Galbula galbula
      - White-chinned jacamar, Galbula tombacea
      - Bluish-fronted jacamar, Galbula cyanescens
      - Purplish jacamar, Galbula chalcothorax
      - Bronzy jacamar, Galbula leucogastra
      - Paradise jacamar, Galbula dea
