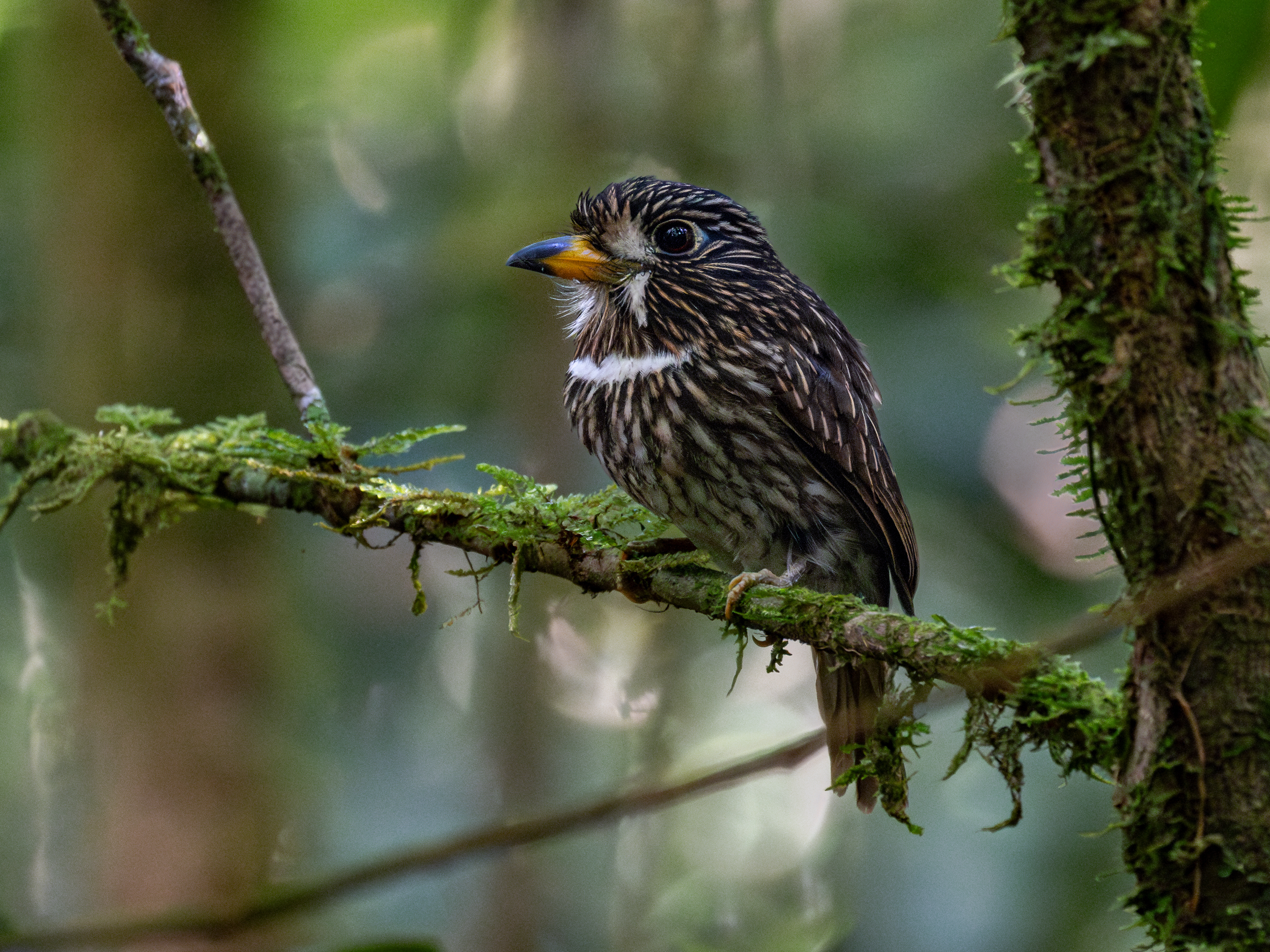

Conservation status
- Least Concern (IUCN 3.1)

Scientific classification
- Kingdom: Animalia
- Phylum: Chordata
- Class: Aves
- Order: Piciformes
- Family: Bucconidae
- Genus: Malacoptila
- Species: M. fusca

Binomial name
- Malacoptila fusca (Gmelin, JF, 1788)

= White-chested puffbird =

Species of bird

The white-chested puffbird (Malacoptila fusca) is a species of bird in the family Bucconidae, the puffbirds, nunlets, and nunbirds. It is one of seven species in the genus Malacoptila. It is found in Brazil, Colombia, Ecuador, French Guiana, Guyana, Peru, Suriname and Venezuela.

== Taxonomy and systematics ==
The white-chested puffbird was formally described in 1788 by the German naturalist Johann Friedrich Gmelin in his revised and expanded edition of Carl Linnaeus's Systema Naturae. He placed it with the other puffbirds in the genus Bucco and coined the binomial name Bucco fuscus. The specific epithet is Latin meaning "brown" or "dusky". Gmelin based his description on the "white-breasted barbet" that had been described in 1782 by the English ornithologist John Latham from a specimen that had been collected in Cayenne, French Guiana. The white-chested puffbird is now one of seven species placed in the genus Malacoptila that was introduced by George Gray in 1841.

The white-chested puffbird and the semicollared puffbird (Malacoptila semicincta) were considered to be conspecific by James Peters in 1958 but they are now treated as a superspecies. The white-chested puffbird is generally considered to be monotypic, though a subspecies M. f. venezuelae was proposed in 1947.

== Description ==
The white-chested puffbird is about 18 cm (7.1 in) long and weighs about 44 g (1.6 oz). The head, upperparts, and wing coverts are dark brown, with the crown being blackish brown. Pale shafts to the feathers give a streaked appearance. The tail is warm brown. It has a whitish "whisker" and chin and a thin white crescent across the upper breast. The underparts are dirty white or buff with brown streaks and mottling. The bill is yellow-orange with a black tip, the eye reddish brown, yellow, or red, and the legs and feet yellow olive to pale olive.

The song is "a long, descending musical trill: tree'e'e'e'e'e'e'e'e'ew." Its calls include "a descending, high, mewing whistle peeww."

== Distribution and habitat ==
The white-chested puffbird is found in two large disjunct areas. One is from eastern Colombia and southwestern Venezuela south through eastern Ecuador and central Peru as far as the valley of the Apurímac River. The other is in the lower Amazon Basin from the Guianas east and south into Brazil's Amazonas and Pará states. It inhabits the understory of tropical evergreen forest, both terra firme and várzea. It is a bird of the lowlands. In elevation it ranges up to 200 m (660 ft) in Venezuela, 600 m (2,000 ft) in Colombia, 900 m (3,000 ft) in Ecuador (though locally to 1,200 m (3,900 ft)), and 1,500 m (4,900 ft) in Peru.

== Behavior ==
=== Feeding ===
The white-chested puffbird hunts from a perch several meters above the ground, remaining motionless for long periods before sallying to capture prey on the ground or from vegetation. It then usually flies to a different perch. It sometimes follows army ant swarms. Its diet has not been described in detail, but it is probably mostly insects with some small invertebrates.

=== Breeding ===
Essentially nothing is known about the white-chested puffbird's breeding phenology. It is thought to nest in a burrow in the ground as does its close relative the white-whiskered puffbird (M. panamensis).

== Status ==
The IUCN has assessed the white-chested puffbird as being of Least Concern. It has a large range, and though its population size has not been determined it is believed to be stable. No specific threats have been identified.
