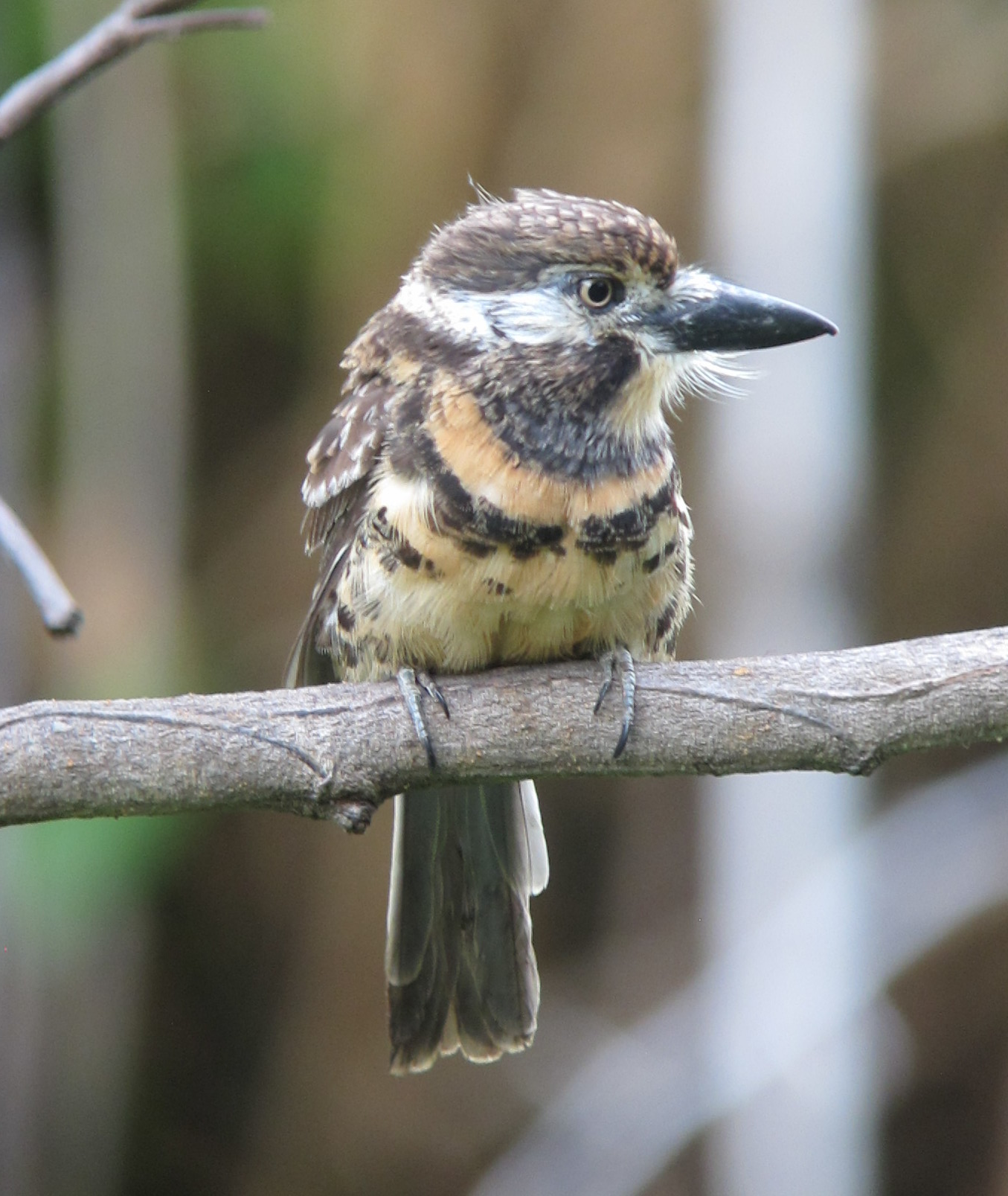

Conservation status
- Least Concern (IUCN 3.1)

Scientific classification
- Kingdom: Animalia
- Phylum: Chordata
- Class: Aves
- Order: Piciformes
- Family: Bucconidae
- Genus: Hypnelus
- Species: H. bicinctus

Binomial name
- Hypnelus bicinctus (Gould, 1837)

Synonyms
- Hypnelus ruficollis bicinctus

= Two-banded puffbird =

Species of bird

The two-banded puffbird (Hypnelus bicinctus) is a species of bird in the family Bucconidae, the puffbirds, nunlets, and nunbirds. It is found in Colombia and Venezuela.

== Taxonomy and systematics ==
The taxonomy of the two-banded puffbird is unsettled. The International Ornithological Committee (IOC) and BirdLife International's Handbook of the Birds of the World (HBW) consider it a species. They assign two subspecies, the nominate H. b. bicinctus and H. b. stoicus. However, the Clements taxonomy treats the two as subspecies of the russet-throated puffbird (H. ruficollis). The South American Classification Committee of the American Ornithological Society (SACC) recognizes that treating H. bicinctus as a species might be valid but has not received a formal proposal for the split.

== Description ==
The adult of the nominate subspecies of two-banded puffbird has a dark brown crown with pale brown spots, a buffy patch from the bill to the eye, a whitish patch on the cheek, and a black patch below and behind the white one. The nape has a narrow whitish collar. The upperparts are dull brown with whitish mottling while the closed wing is dull brown with whitish scallops. The tail is long and dark brown with thin pale edges to the feathers. The chin is whitish and the throat and upper breast reddish buff. Under them are two black bands across the chest. The rest of the belly is reddish buff with black spots on its upper edge and the flanks are whitish with large black spots. H. b. stoicus is similar but slightly browner and paler above, has a less dramatically marked face, and has buff tips to the feathers of the upper breastband.

== Distribution and habitat ==
The nominate subspecies of two-banded puffbird is found in the llanos of northeastern Colombia and into northern Venezuela almost to Lake Maracaibo on the west, east to near the Guyana border, and south slightly into Amazonas and Bolívar states. H. b. stoicus is found only on Margarita Island off the central Venezuelan coast. On the mainland it inhabits open and near open landscapes including the llanos savanna, thickets, abandoned farms, and the edges of deciduous woodland. It occurs almost exclusively below 500 m (1,600 ft) of elevation. On Margarita it inhabits bushland and woods from plains into the foothills. No seasonal movements have been documented, though its habitat undergoes seasonal changes. It sometimes is common in an area and then vacates it for several years.

== Behavior ==
=== Feeding ===
The two-banded puffbird still-hunts from a high open perch or a lower shaded one. It sallies to capture its prey; its diet has not been fully documented but is known to include insects.

=== Breeding ===
The two-banded puffbird's breeding season appears to include May and June, though details are lacking. It excavates a burrow in an arboreal termitarium. Its clutch size has not been determined, but that of its former conspecific russet-throated puffbird is three eggs.

=== Vocalization ===
The two-banded puffbird's song is "a rhythmic repeated 'tak-ta-tóoo'" and its call "a croaking note, surpisingly loud" that is sometimes given in flight.

== Status ==
The IUCN has assessed the two-banded puffbird as being of Least Concern. It has a large range, and though its population size has not been determined it is believed to be stable. It is generally common throughout its mainland range, and "human land uses do not appear to pose any immediate threats." Its status on Margarita Island isn't known.
