= Nystactes =

Nystactes may refer to:

- Nystactes (bird), a genus of birds in the family Bucconidae
- Nystactes, a genus of bats in the family Vespertilionidae, synonym of Myotis
- Nystactes, a genus of fishes in the family Congridae, synonym of Heteroconger
