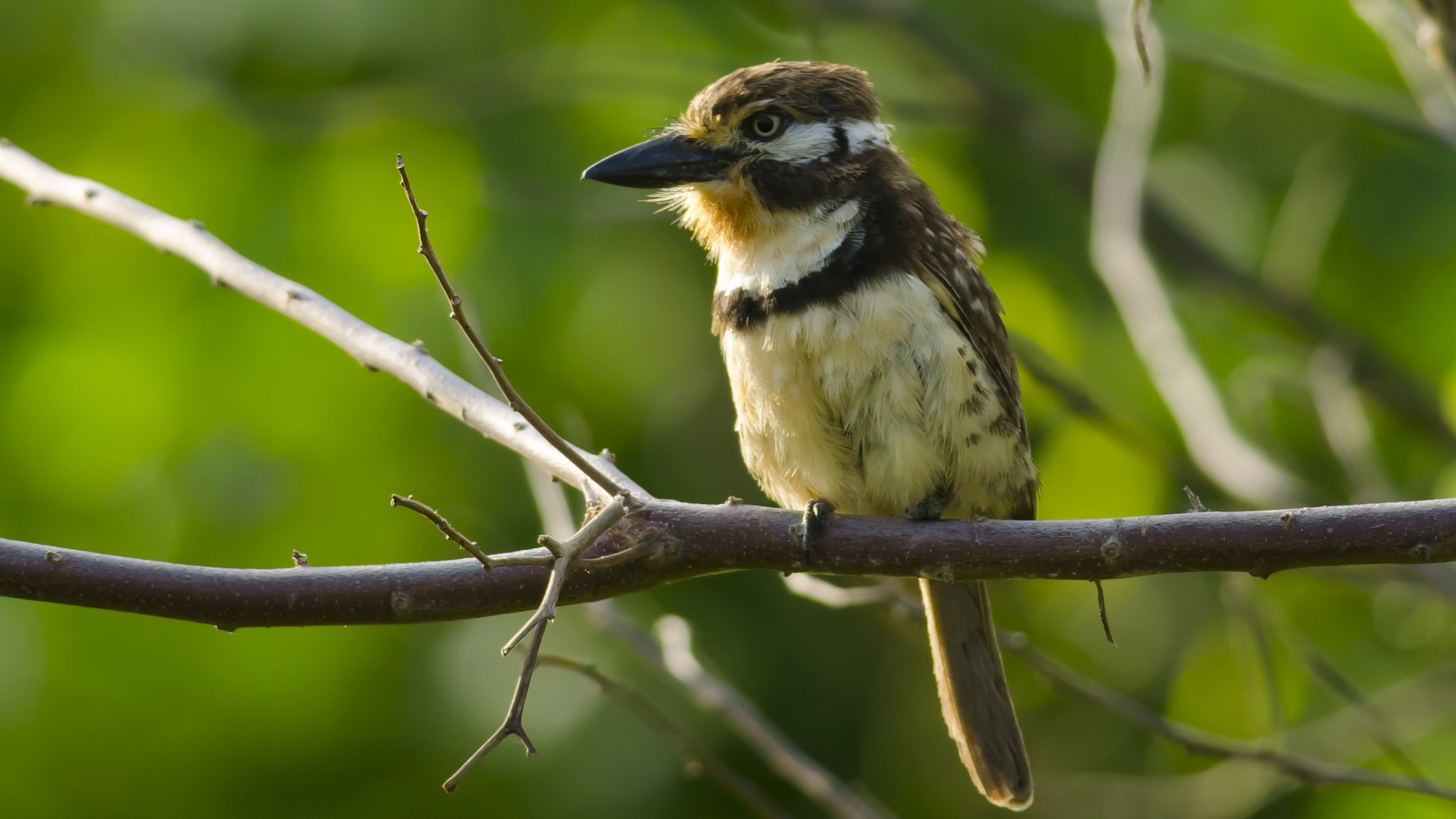
- Russet-throated puffbird (Hypnelus ruficollis)

Scientific classification
- Kingdom: Animalia
- Phylum: Chordata
- Class: Aves
- Order: Piciformes
- Family: Bucconidae
- Genus: Hypnelus; Cabanis & Heine, 1863

Type species
- Tamatia bicincta Gould, 1837

= Hypnelus =

Genus of birds

Hypnelus is a genus of birds in the family Bucconidae. It contains 2 species of South American puffbirds. Some taxonomic authorities consider both species to be conspecific, together taking the name russet-throated puffbird.

== Species ==
Genus Hypnelus – Cabanis & Heine, 1863 – two species
Common name	Scientific name and subspecies	Range	Size and ecology	IUCN status and estimated population
Two-banded puffbird	Hypnelus bicinctus (Gould, 1837) Two subspecies: H. b. bicinctus; H. b. stoicus	eastern Colombia and Venezuela.	Size: Habitat: Diet:	LC
Russet-throated puffbird	Hypnelus ruficollis (Wagler, 1829) Four subspecies: H. r. decolor; H. r. ruficollis; H. r. striaticollis; H. r. coloratus	northeastern Colombia and northwestern Venezuela.	Size: Habitat: Diet:	LC
