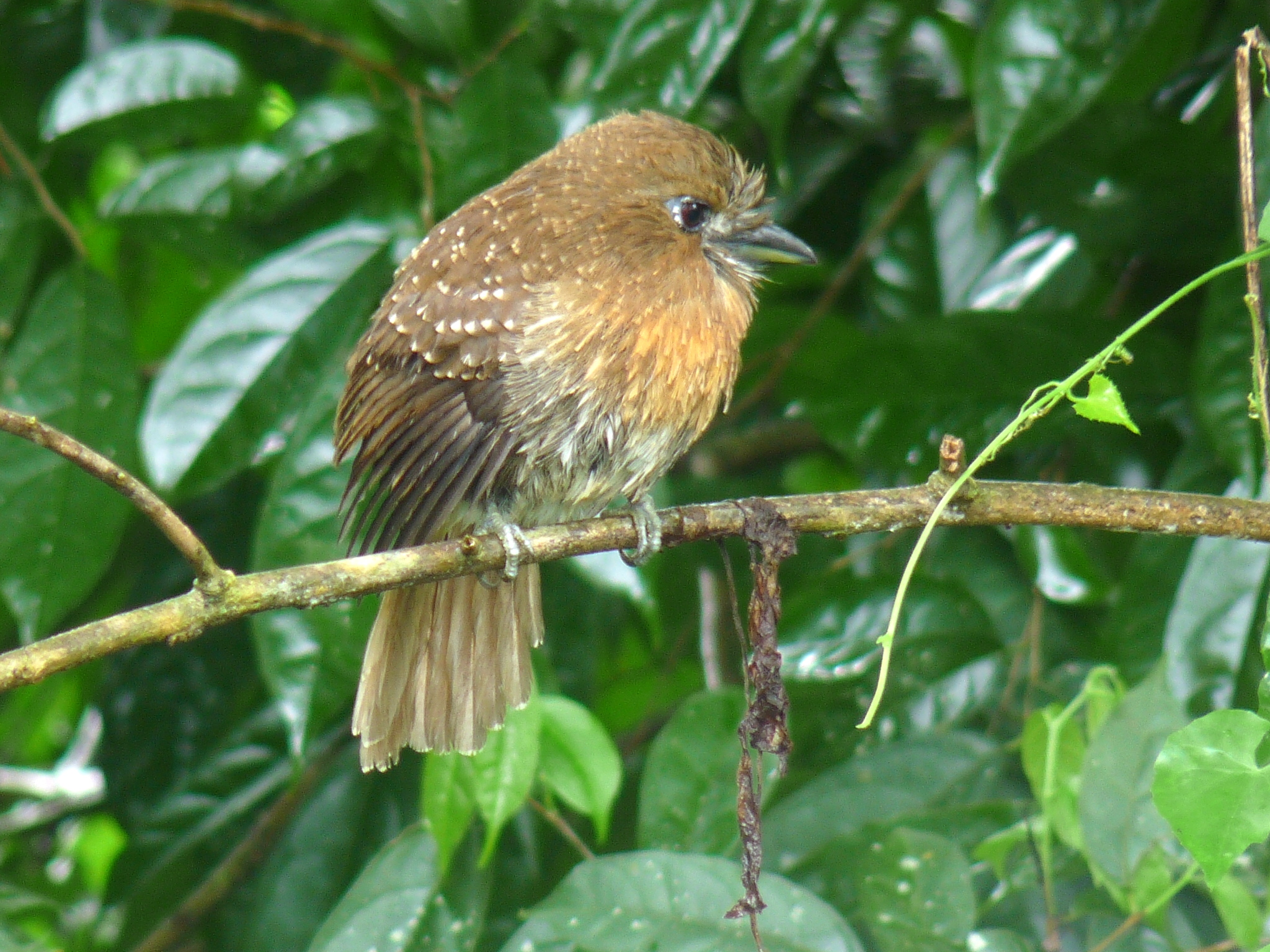
- In Manizales, Caldas, Colombia

Conservation status
- Least Concern (IUCN 3.1)

Scientific classification
- Kingdom: Animalia
- Phylum: Chordata
- Class: Aves
- Order: Piciformes
- Family: Bucconidae
- Genus: Malacoptila
- Species: M. mystacalis

Binomial name
- Malacoptila mystacalis (Lafresnaye, 1850)

= Moustached puffbird =

Species of bird

The moustached puffbird (Malacoptila mystacalis) is a species of bird in the family Bucconidae, the puffbirds, nunlets, and nunbirds. It is one of seven species in the genus Malacoptila. It is found in Colombia, Ecuador, and Venezuela.

== Taxonomy and systematics ==
The moustached puffbird is monotypic, though the population in southwestern Colombia might merit treatment as a subspecies. It is thought to form a superspecies with the white-whiskered puffbird (M. panamensis) and black-streaked puffbird (M. fulvogularis).

== Description ==
The moustached puffbird is 20 to 23 cm (7.9 to 9.1 in) long and weighs 47 to 50 g (1.7 to 1.8 oz). Unlike most puffbirds, the male and female have different plumages. Both sexes have bristles around the base of the large bill, and white "whiskers", which are actually tufts of feathers. The adult male is drab brown above with white to buffy spots on the back and the wing coverts. Its tail is brown with small buffy markings. Its lores and a half ring behind the eye are white. The chin, throat, and breast are rufous with indistinct darker streaks on the last. The belly is white and the flanks dull brown with whitish bars and streaks. The bill is black, the eye red, and the feet silvery bluish. The adult female is grayer above with heavier buff markings and has a paler breast with heavier streaks. Immatures are darker with less obvious light markings and is less rufous on the breast.

== Distribution and habitat ==
The moustached puffbird is found in the Andes, in northern and northwestern Venezuela through Colombia and slightly into northern Ecuador. It is primarily a bird of the undergrowth of humid and wet forests, though it also occurs along the edges of forest and in open woodland. It usually stays within 6 m (20 ft) of the ground. In elevation it ranges from 350 to 2,100 m (1,100 to 6,900 ft).

== Behavior ==
=== Feeding ===
No information has been published about the moustached puffbird's feeding behavior or diet.

=== Breeding ===
The moustached puffbird appears to breed between May and August in Venezuela and February to September in Colombia. It nests in a hole excavated in an earth bank, but no other details of its breeding phenology are known.

=== Vocalization ===
The moustached puffbird's song is a "[h]igh thin peeping" like that of other puffbirds in its genus.

== Status ==
The IUCN has assessed the moustached puffbird as being of Least Concern. Though its population has not been determined, it is thought to be stable. No immediate threats have been identified.
