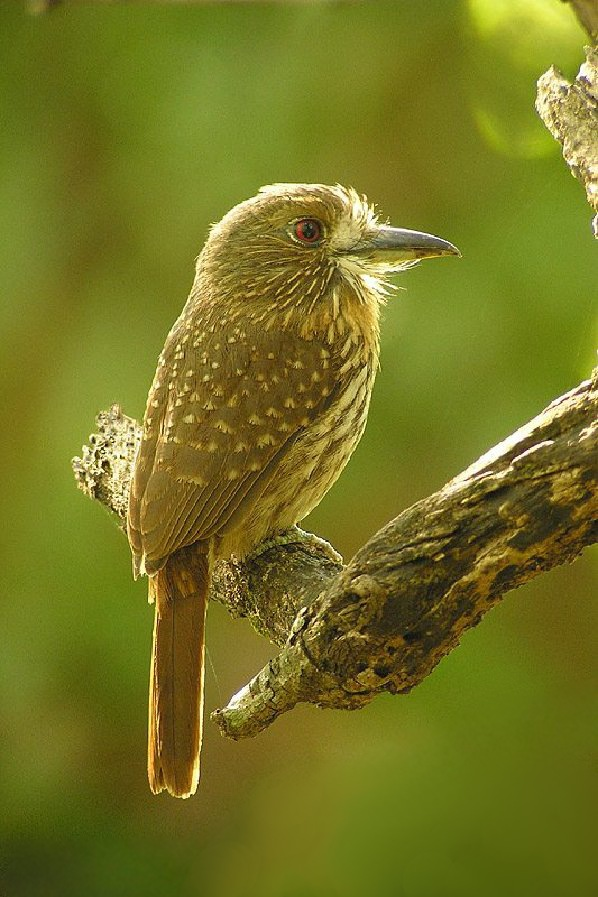

Conservation status
- Least Concern (IUCN 3.1)

Scientific classification
- Kingdom: Animalia
- Phylum: Chordata
- Class: Aves
- Order: Piciformes
- Family: Bucconidae
- Genus: Malacoptila
- Species: M. panamensis

Binomial name
- Malacoptila panamensis Lafresnaye, 1847

= White-whiskered puffbird =

Species of bird

The white-whiskered puffbird (Malacoptila panamensis), also called the white-whiskered soft-wing or brown puffbird, is a bird in the family Bucconidae, the puffbirds, nunlets, and nunbirds. It is found from southeastern Mexico through Central America (except El Salvador), Colombia, and Ecuador into Peru.

== Taxonomy and systematics ==
The white-whiskered puffbird has these four subspecies:

- M. p. inornata du Bus de Gisignies (1847)
- M. p. panamensis Lafresnaye (1847)
- M. p. magdalenae Todd (1943)
- M. p. poliopsis Sclater (1862)

It is thought to form a superspecies with the moustached puffbird (M. mystacalis) and black-streaked puffbird (M. fulvogularis).

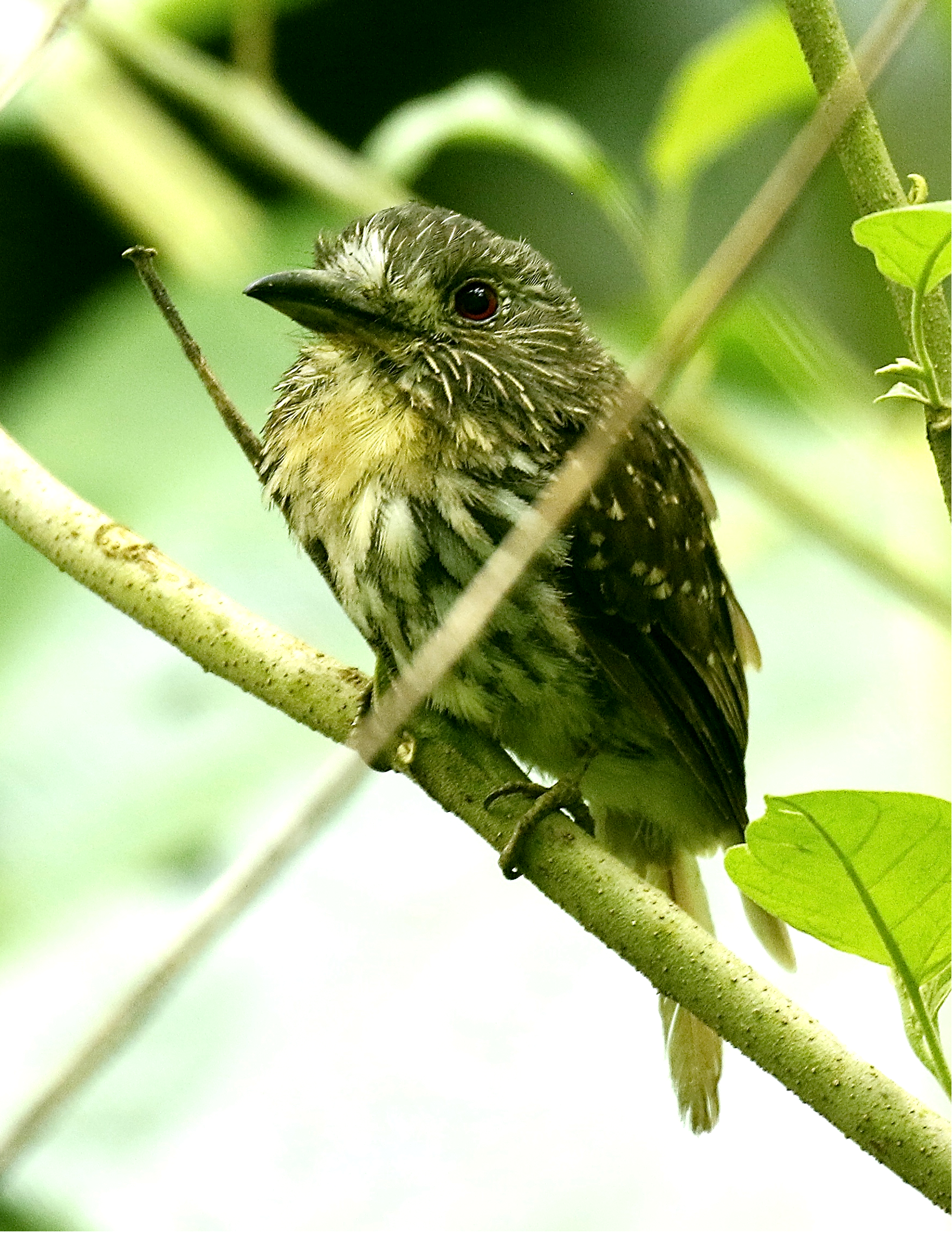
Ventral view. San Francisco Reserve - Darien, Panama

== Description ==
The white-whiskered puffbird is about 18 cm (7.1 in) long with an average weight of about 43 g (1.5 oz). Unlike most puffbirds, the male and female have different plumages. Both sexes have bristles around the base of the large bill, and white "whiskers", which are actually tufts of feathers. The nominate adult male's upperparts are brown to chestnut brown. The forecrown has narrow buff or tawny streaks and most of the rest of the upperparts have buff or tawny spots. The tail is chesnut brown. Its lores, supercilium, cheeks, and the sides of the neck are tawny. The throat and upper breast are tawny to tawny buff and the rest of the underparts are buffy white with darker streaks on the breast and flanks. The adult female has less of a chesnut cast; its crown is grayer and its upperparts olive to brown. Most of the underparts are buff to cinnamon-buff with darker streaks; the abdomen is white. Juveniles are like the female but with heavier streaking on the underparts. The subspecies are all similar to the nominate, differing mainly in the shades of gray, brown, and rufous and in the density of the streaking.

== Distribution and habitat ==
The subspecies of white-whiskered puffbird are distributed thus:

- M. p. inornata, the Caribbean slope from southeastern Mexico through Belize, Guatemala, Nicaragua, and Costa Rica into western Panama.
- M. p. panamensis, the Pacific slope from southwestern Costa Rica through Panama into northwestern Colombia
- M. p. magdalenae, the Magdalena River valley of west-central Colombia
- M. p. poliopsis, southwestern Colombia through western Ecuador into extreme northwestern Peru

The species mostly inhabits dense primary evergreen forest though it is also found in secondary forest and in shorter vegetation around the edges of fields. It typically remains fairly low, within 6 m (20 ft) of the ground. In elevation it ranges from sea level to 750 m (2,500 ft) in northern Central America, to 900 m (3,000 ft) on the Caribbean slope of Costa Rica and in Colombia, and as high as 1,200 m (3,900 ft) on the Pacific slope of Costa Rica.

== Behavior ==
=== Feeding ===
Like other puffbirds, the white-whiskered puffbird hunts by a watch-and-wait technique, sitting motionless before darting to catch large invertebrates and small vertebrates such as frogs and lizards. The prey is taken back to the perch and beaten against it prior to consumption. It has also been recorded following army ant swarms and joining mixed-species foraging flocks.

=== Breeding ===
Almost all of the data on the white-whiskered puffbird's breeding phenology comes from Costa Rica. The breeding season there spans from mid-March into July. Nests are placed in a cavity at the end of a 46 to 56 cm (1.5 to 1.8 ft) long, 6 cm (2 in) diameter burrow in, usually, gently sloping ground. The wider nesting chamber is lined with dried leaves. The female lays two, rarely three, glossy white eggs. Both sexes incubate the eggs.

=== Vocalization ===
The white-whiskered puffbird's song is "a high-pitched descending trill ... usually with an emphasized note at the end, e.g., tssiirrrrr-tsít." It sings less often than many other puffbirds. A frequently heard call is "a high, thin, slightly reedy, drawn-out tsssiiiw or tssssiiir, fading away".

== Status ==
The IUCN has assessed the white-whiskered puffbird as being of Least Concern. It has a very large range and an estimated population of at least 50,000 mature individuals, though the latter is believed to be decreasing. It "is vulnerable to habitat loss through deforestation [but] can occupy advanced second growth".
