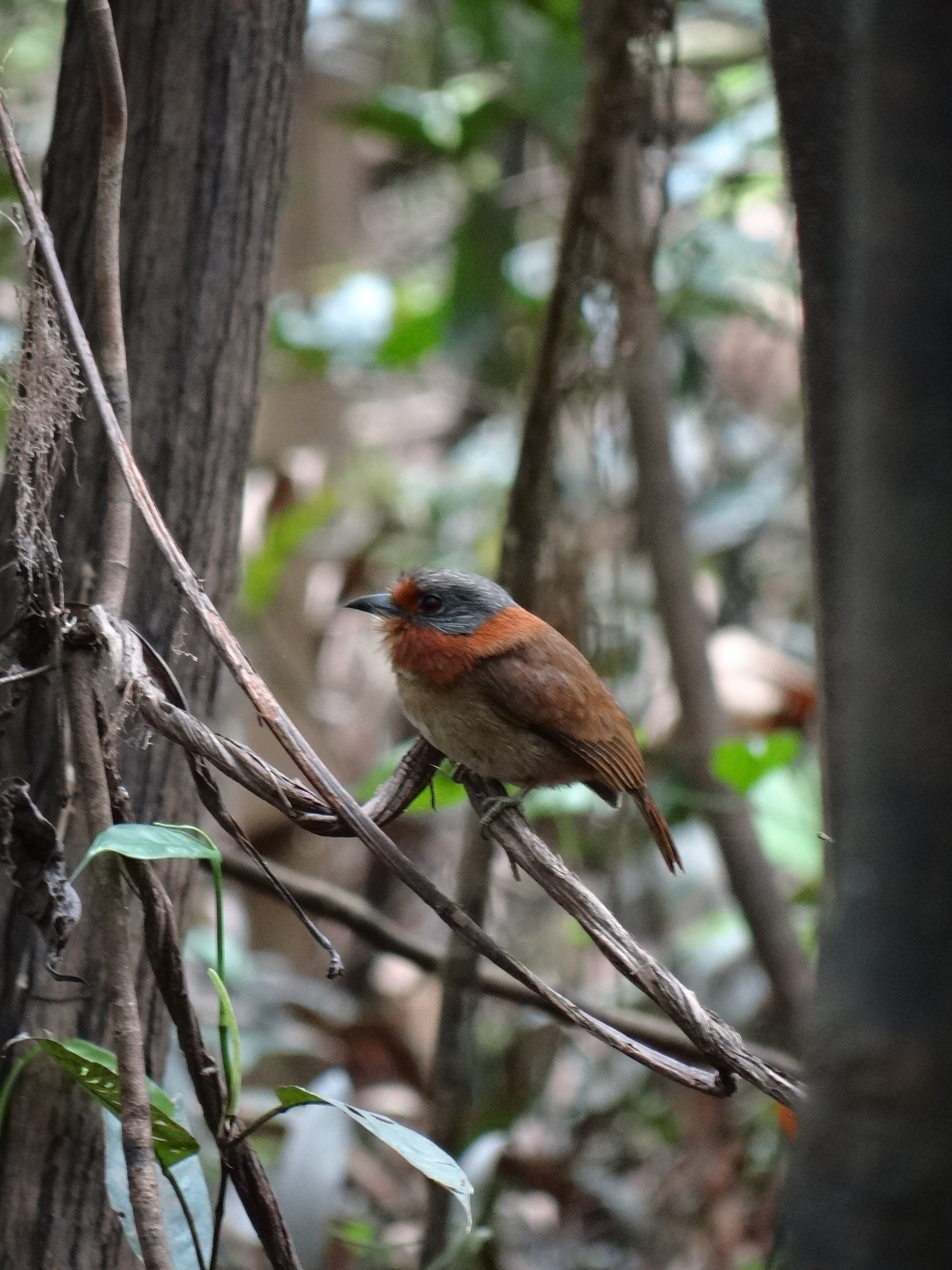

Conservation status
- Least Concern (IUCN 3.1)

Scientific classification
- Kingdom: Animalia
- Phylum: Chordata
- Class: Aves
- Order: Piciformes
- Family: Bucconidae
- Genus: Malacoptila
- Species: M. rufa

Binomial name
- Malacoptila rufa (Spix, 1824)

= Rufous-necked puffbird =

Species of bird

The rufous-necked puffbird (Malacoptila rufa) is a species of bird in the family Bucconidae, the puffbirds, nunlets, and nunbirds. It is found in Bolivia, Brazil, and Peru.

== Taxonomy and systematics ==
The rufous-necked puffbird has two subspecies, the nominate M. r. rufa and M. r. brunnescens.

== Description ==
The rufous-necked puffbird is about 18 cm (7.1 in) long and weighs about 39 to 46 g (1.4 to 1.6 oz). It is somewhat unusual for a puffbird because it is unstreaked. The nominate subspecies' crown and cheeks are dark gray with narrow pale streaks and there is a large rufous loral spot. The nape has a wide rufous collar that extends onto the sides of the neck. The back is dark brown and the wings and tail a warmer brown. The underparts are shades of brown, darker on the breast and paler on the belly. The upper breast has a white crescent with a thin black border under it. The bill is blue-gray to black, the eye dark brown or dark red, and the feet pale gray-brown to pale olive-gray. M. r. brunnescens is very similar to the nominate, differing mainly in the intensity of the colors.

== Distribution and habitat ==
The rufous-necked puffbird is found in southern Amazonia. M. r. rufa occurs in northeastern Peru, northeastern Bolivia, and western Brazil south of the Amazon River and west of the Madeira River. M. r. brunnescens occurs in Brazil south of the Amazon and east of the Tapajós River to the Atlantic Ocean. Intergrades between the two subspecies occur between the Madeira and Tapajós. In most of its range it inhabits the understory of terra firme evergreen forest. In northeastern Peru it appears to be restricted to várzea forest.

== Behavior ==
=== Feeding ===
The rufous-necked puffbird hunts from a perch several meters above the ground; it sallies to capture prey from vegetation or the ground. Its diet has not been studied extensively but is known to be mostly insects and other invertebrates with perhaps small vertebrates as well. It occasionally joins mixed-species foraging flocks and attends army ant swarms.

=== Breeding ===
Almost nothing is known about the rufous-necked puffbird's breeding phenology. One nest was in a tunnel in the ground.

=== Vocalization ===
The rufous-necked puffbird's song is "a long, descending musical trill, indistinguishable from songs of White-chested [Malacoptila fusca] and Semicollared [Malacoptila semicincta] puffbirds." Calls include "a thin seeeee whistle" and "an agitated harsh rasping series: trr'r'r'r'r-SHEEAH trr'r'r'r'r-SHEEAH trr'r'r'r'r-SHEEAH...".

== Status ==
The IUCN has assessed the rufous-necked puffbird as being of Least Concern. It has a very large range, but its population has not been quantified and is believed to be decreasing. No specific threats have been identified.
