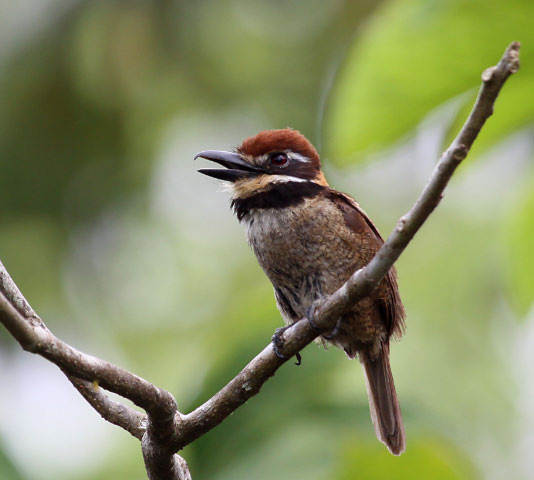

Conservation status
- Least Concern (IUCN 3.1)

Scientific classification
- Kingdom: Animalia
- Phylum: Chordata
- Class: Aves
- Order: Piciformes
- Family: Bucconidae
- Genus: Bucco
- Species: B. macrodactylus

Binomial name
- Bucco macrodactylus (Spix, 1824)

Synonyms
- Cyphos macrodactylus; Argicus macrodactulus

= Chestnut-capped puffbird =

Species of bird

The chestnut-capped puffbird (Bucco macrodactylus) is a species of bird in the family Bucconidae, the puffbirds, nunlets, and nunbirds. It is found in Bolivia, Brazil, Colombia, Ecuador, Peru, and Venezuela.

== Taxonomy and systematics ==
The chestnut-capped puffbird has variously been placed in genera Bucco, Argicus, and Cyphos. As of 2021, the International Ornithological Committee (IOC) and the Clements taxonomy place it in Bucco, while BirdLife International's Handbook of the Birds of the World (HBW) place it by itself in Cyphos. All three treat it as monotypic, though part of the Venezuelan population has sometimes been separated as B. m. caurensis.

== Description ==
The chestnut-capped puffbird is 14 to 16.5 cm (5.5 to 6.5 in) long and weighs about 25 g (0.88 oz). Its plumage is unique among puffbirds. Its crown is chestnut, its nape a bright reddish orange, and the rest of the upperparts brown with a few lighter bars on the back and many on the rump. The tail is long, narrow, and warm dark brown. It has a thin white supercilium, black cheeks and lower throat with a white line between them, and a reddish white chin and upper throat. The chin feathers curl up over the base of the bill. Below the black throat is a white band and the rest of the underparts are buffy with fine dusky barring except on the lower belly. The bill is black, the eye red to brown, and the feet brownish- to greenish gray.

== Distribution and habitat ==
The chestnut-capped puffbird is found in the upper Amazon Basin of southern Venezuela; eastern Colombia, Ecuador, and Peru; northern Bolivia; and western Brazil. It is found in many forest types but typically near water. Examples include terra firme and várzea forest, early successional and secondary forest, and gallery forest. It also occurs away from water in scrubby forest. It usually stays fairly low, from the undergrowth and understory to the subcanopy, and frequently perches within 6 m (20 ft) of the ground. In elevation it is usually found below 660 m (2,200 ft) but has been recorded as high as 1,000 m (3,300 ft) in Peru and once at 1,200 m (3,900 ft) in Ecuador.

== Behavior ==
=== Feeding ===
The chestnut-capped puffbird forages by sallies from a perch to pluck insects from vegetation. It has also been reported to take small vertebrates.

=== Breeding ===
Almost nothing is known about the chestnut-capped puffbird's breeding phenology. One nest was a cavity in a termitarium about 2.5 m (8 ft) up in a tree.

=== Vocalization ===
The chestnut-capped puffbird's song is "a series of plaintive but abrupt rising notes ending in [a] twitter, 'pup pup pep pep peep peep pip pip pip piz'".

== Status ==
The IUCN has assessed the chestnut-capped puffbird as being of Least Concern. It has a very large range but an unknown population size that is believed to be decreasing. It is considered uncommon to locally common in various parts of its range.
