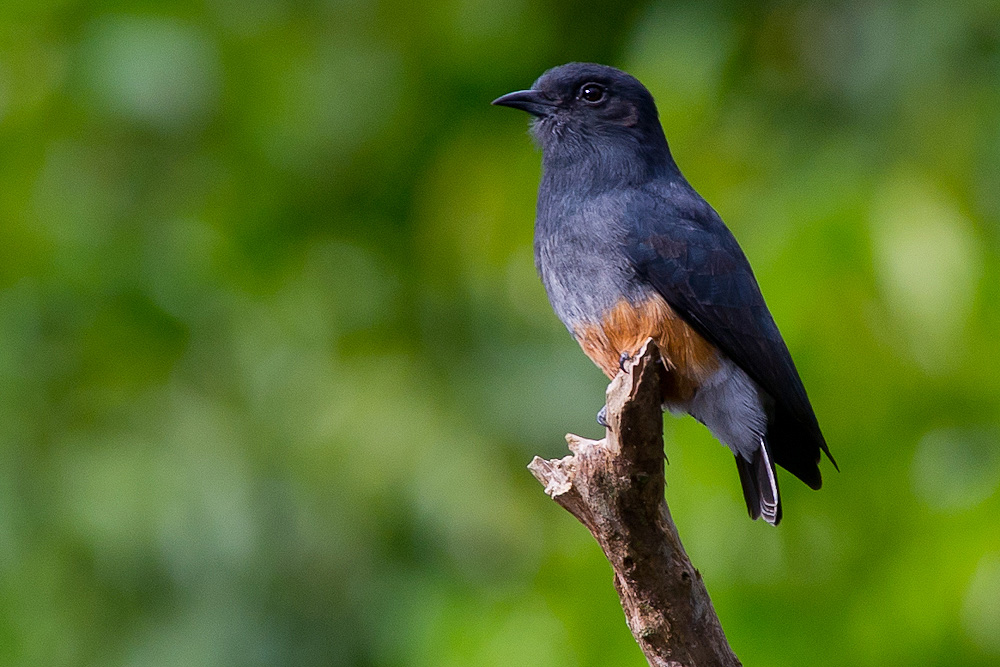

Conservation status
- Least Concern (IUCN 3.1)

Scientific classification
- Kingdom: Animalia
- Phylum: Chordata
- Class: Aves
- Order: Piciformes
- Family: Bucconidae
- Genus: Chelidoptera; Gould, 1837
- Species: C. tenebrosa

Binomial name
- Chelidoptera tenebrosa (Pallas, 1782)

= Swallow-winged puffbird =

Species of bird

The swallow-winged puffbird (Chelidoptera tenebrosa) is a species of bird in the family Bucconidae, the puffbirds, nunlets, and nunbirds. It is also called the swallow-wing. It is found in Bolivia, Brazil, Colombia, Ecuador, French Guiana, Guyana, Peru, Suriname, and Venezuela.

== Taxonomy and systematics ==
The swallow-winged puffbird was previously known as simply "swallow-wing" but its current name has been widely accepted since the late twentieth century. It is the only member of its genus. It has three subspecies, the nominate C. t. tenebrosa, C. t. brasiliensis, and C. t. pallida.

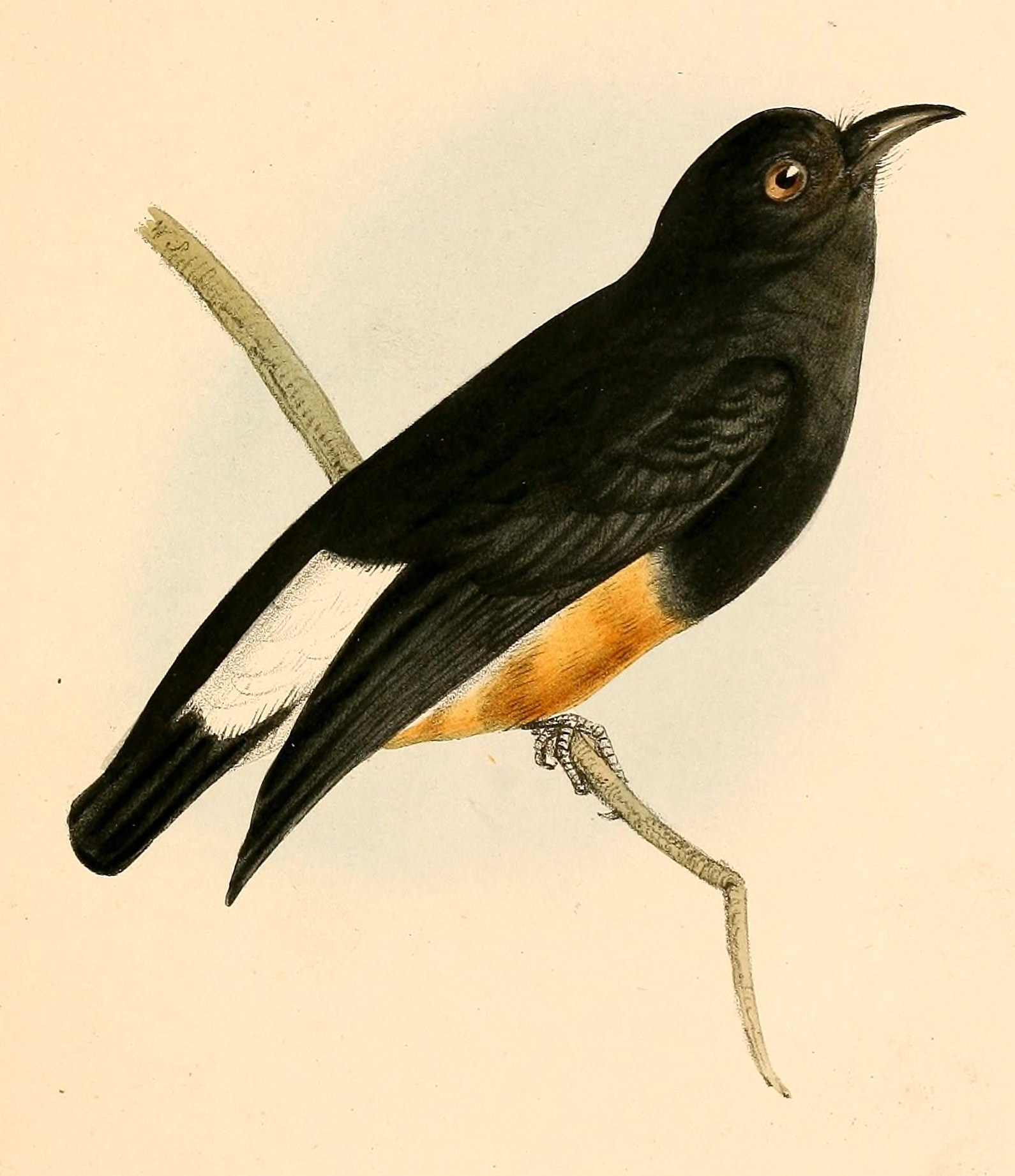
Chelidoptera tenebrosa illustration by Swainson, 1841

== Description ==
The swallow-winged puffbird is 14 to 15 cm (5.5 to 5.9 in) long and weighs 30 to 41.5 g (1.1 to 1.5 oz). The nominate subspecies has sooty black upperparts with some bluish iridescence. The lower back and rump are white. Its tail is short and black with white tips to the feathers that quickly wear away. The wings are long and pointed. The chin is whitish, the throat grayish, and the breast sooty black fading to gray in its lower part. Its belly is orange-chestnut. The bill is black, the eye dark brown, and the feet dark gray or black. C. t. brasiliensis is larger than the nominate; the underparts have a whitish band separating the grey lower breast from the belly, which is more ochraceous than the nominate's. C. t. pallida has paler underparts than the nominate, with a distinct white band separating the gray lower breast from the chestnut of the belly.

== Distribution and habitat ==
The swallow-winged puffbird is found throughout the Amazon Basin to the foothills of the Andes in the west and south through central Brazil. It also has a population along the southeastern Brazilian coast. The nominate subspecies is by far the most widespread, occurring in most of Venezuela, south through eastern Colombia, Ecuador, and Peru to northern Bolivia, and east through the Guianas and much of interior Brazil to its northwestern coast. C. t. brasiliensis is found in the Atlantic Forest of southeastern Brazil approximately from Rio Grande do Norte south to Espírito Santo. C. t. pallida is found only in Venezuela's far northwestern state of Zulia.

The swallow-winged puffbird inhabits a variety of open and semi-open landscapes. It appears to prefer open areas with scattered bushes on sandy soils within generally forested areas. It has also been recorded in savanna; the edges of transitional, secondary, and deciduous forest; várzea forest, and gallery forest. In elevation it mostly ranges from sea level to 1,000 m (3,300 ft) but can locally be found as high as 1,750 m (5,700 ft).

== Behavior ==
=== Feeding ===
The swallow-winged puffbird hunts by sorties from an exposed perch. Its diet is mostly flying insects that it captures on the wing and consumes in flight.

=== Breeding ===
The swallow-winged puffbird's breeding season varies across its wide range. It digs a nest tunnel in flat sandy ground or an earthen bank (including human-made ones such as road cuts). The clutch is one or two whitish eggs.

=== Vocalization ===
The swallow-winged puffbird has a "[t]wittering song often given in flight". Its calls include "'tsi-tsi-tsi' and [a] high clear 'dí-didi dí-didi dí-didi…'."

== Status ==
The IUCN has assessed the swallow-winged puffbird as being of Least Concern. It has an extremely large range, and though its population has not been enumerated it is believed to be increasing. It is "characterized in general as locally common...according to habitat availability." It might even benefit from human actions such as conversion of forest to pasture and road building.
