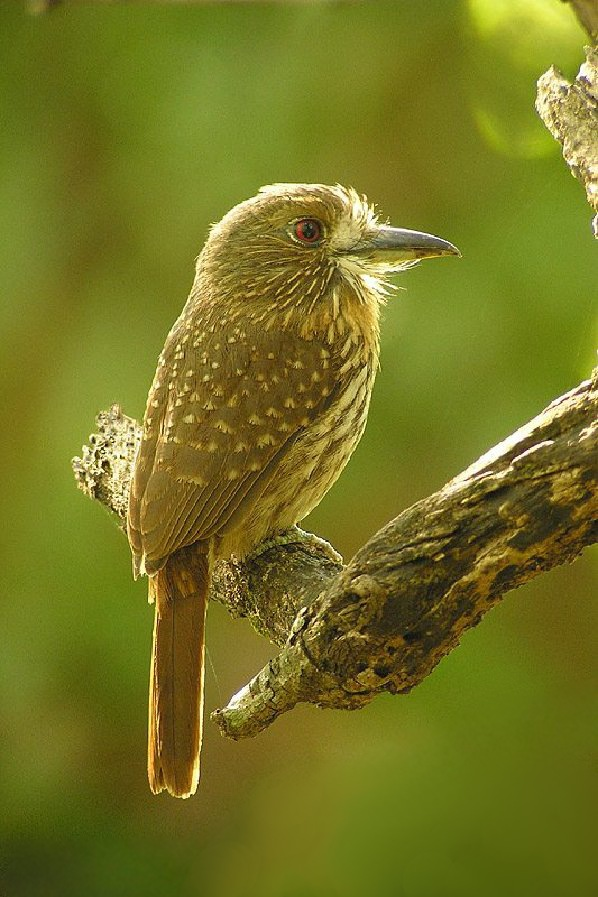
- White-whiskered puffbird (Malacoptila panamensis)

Scientific classification
- Kingdom: Animalia
- Phylum: Chordata
- Class: Aves
- Order: Piciformes
- Family: Bucconidae
- Genus: Malacoptila; G.R. Gray, 1841

Type species
- Bucco fuscus Gmelin, 1788

Species
- See article

= Malacoptila =

Genus of birds

Malacoptila is a genus of puffbirds in the family Bucconidae, one of ten genera. The seven species are found in Central and South America

The genus Malacoptila was introduced in 1841 by the English zoologist George Robert Gray. He listed three species in the new genus but did not specify the type. In 1855 Gray designated the type as Bucco fuscus Gmelin, 1788, the white-chested puffbird. The name Malacoptila combines the Ancient Greek malakos meaning "soft" with ptilon meaning "plumage" or "feather".

== Species ==
The genus contains the following seven species:

Image	Common name	Scientific name	Distribution
	White-chested puffbird	Malacoptila fusca	
	Semicollared puffbird	Malacoptila semicincta	
	Crescent-chested puffbird	Malacoptila striata	
	Rufous-necked puffbird	Malacoptila rufa	
	White-whiskered puffbird	Malacoptila panamensis	
	Black-streaked puffbird	Malacoptila fulvogularis	
	Moustached puffbird	Malacoptila mystacalis	
