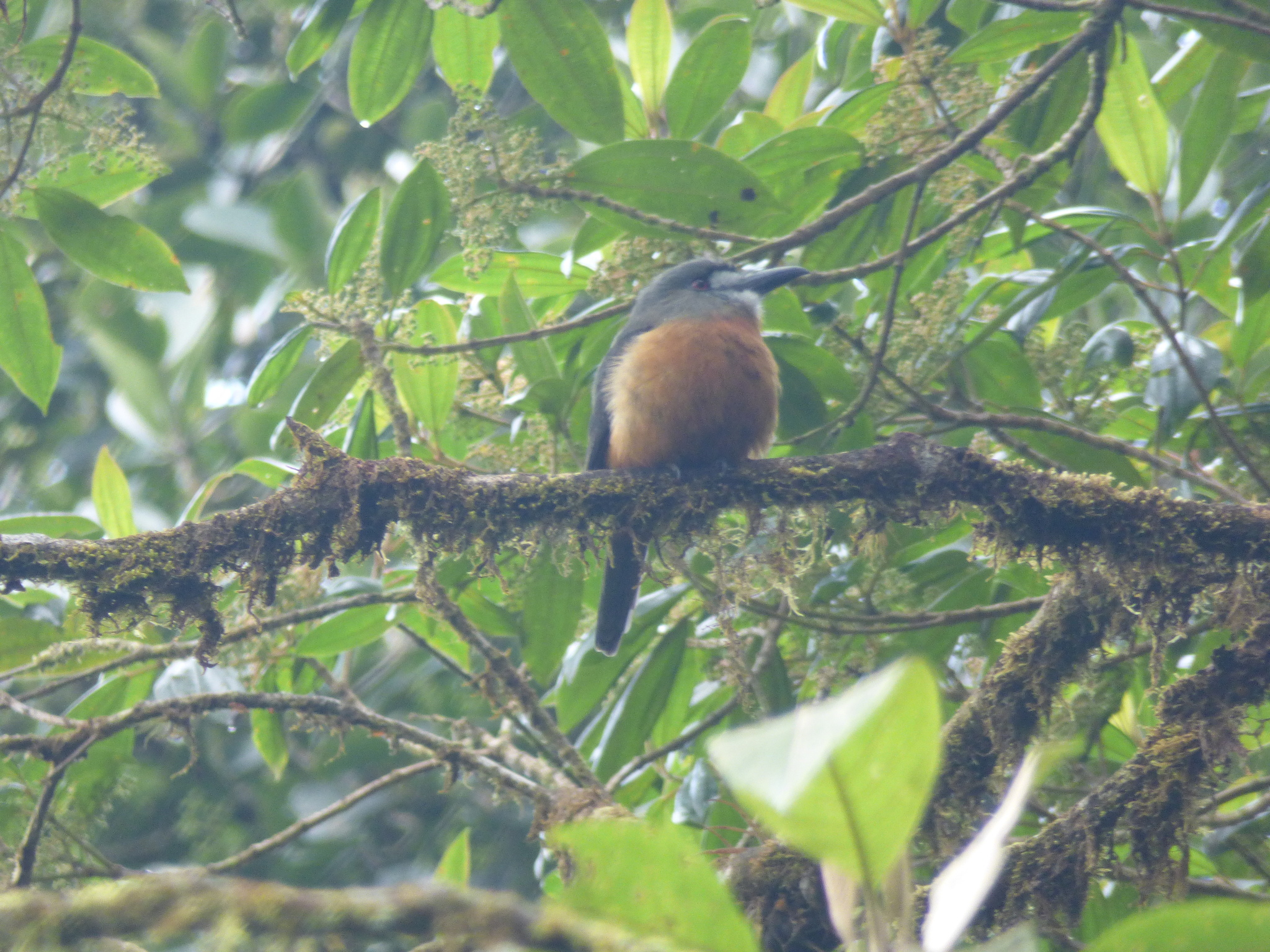

Conservation status
- Least Concern (IUCN 3.1)

Scientific classification
- Kingdom: Animalia
- Phylum: Chordata
- Class: Aves
- Order: Piciformes
- Family: Bucconidae
- Genus: Hapaloptila; P.L. Sclater, 1881
- Species: H. castanea

Binomial name
- Hapaloptila castanea (Verreaux, 1866)

= White-faced nunbird =

Species of bird

The white-faced nunbird (Hapaloptila castanea) is a species of bird in the family Bucconidae, the puffbirds, nunlets, and nunbirds. It is found in Colombia, Ecuador, and Peru.

== Taxonomy and systematics ==
The white-faced nunbird is the only member of its genus and has no subspecies. It is not a "true" nunbird (genus Monasa) and is sometimes called the white-face puffbird.

== Description ==
The white-faced nunbird is 23 to 25 cm (9.1 to 9.8 in) long and weighs 75 to 84 g (2.6 to 3.0 oz). It has a large white patch above the bill with a narrow black border at its top. The crown is gray-brown, the mantle and sides of the face dark brown, and the rest of the upperparts including wings and tail an even darker brown. The chin and throat are white and the rest of the underparts bright chestnut. The bill is black, the eye red, and the legs and feet gray. The sexes are essentially the same, with the female perhaps having paler underparts.

== Distribution and habitat ==
The white-faced nunbird is found on the east slope of the Andes from western Colombia through eastern Ecuador into northwestern and central Peru. It inhabits the interior and edges of humid to wet forest and cloudforest, often on steep slopes and in ravines. It is usually seen from the midstory to the subcanopy. In Colombia and Ecuador it typically ranges from 1,500 to 2,900 m (4,900 to 9,500 ft) of elevation but has been recorded as low as 750 m (2,500 ft). In Peru it is found only between 1,800 to 2,600 m (5,900 to 8,500 ft).

== Behavior ==
=== Feeding ===
The white-faced nunbird mostly forages in the canopy though it is active at all levels. Its diet is primarily insects and other arthropods but also includes some small vertebrates. It occasionally joins mixed-species foraging flocks.

=== Breeding ===
The white-faced nunbird's breeding season has not been fully defined but it includes April and May. One nest has been described. It was a leaf-lined chamber at the end of a 38 cm (15 in) long tunnel in an earthen bank. The clutch size was two eggs. Both members of the pair dug the burrow, incubated the eggs, and fed the young.

=== Vocalization ===
The white-faced nunbird's song is "a series of upward- or downward-inflected (sometimes level) single hoots, or double hoots like pygmy-owl (Glaucidium), sometimes extending to trill or interspersed with rasping notes". It sometimes sings all day but is most vocal near dawn. Its calls are "a mournful, downslurred 'wuooooo' [and a] series of accelerating, then decelerating barking notes, 'pah pah-pahpahpapapapa-pah-pah-grr?'."

== Status ==
The IUCN has assessed the white-faced nunbird as being of Least Concern. Though it has a small range and its population has not been quantified, the latter is believed to be stable. It is considered rare to uncommon and local throughout its range, but does occur in several protected areas.
