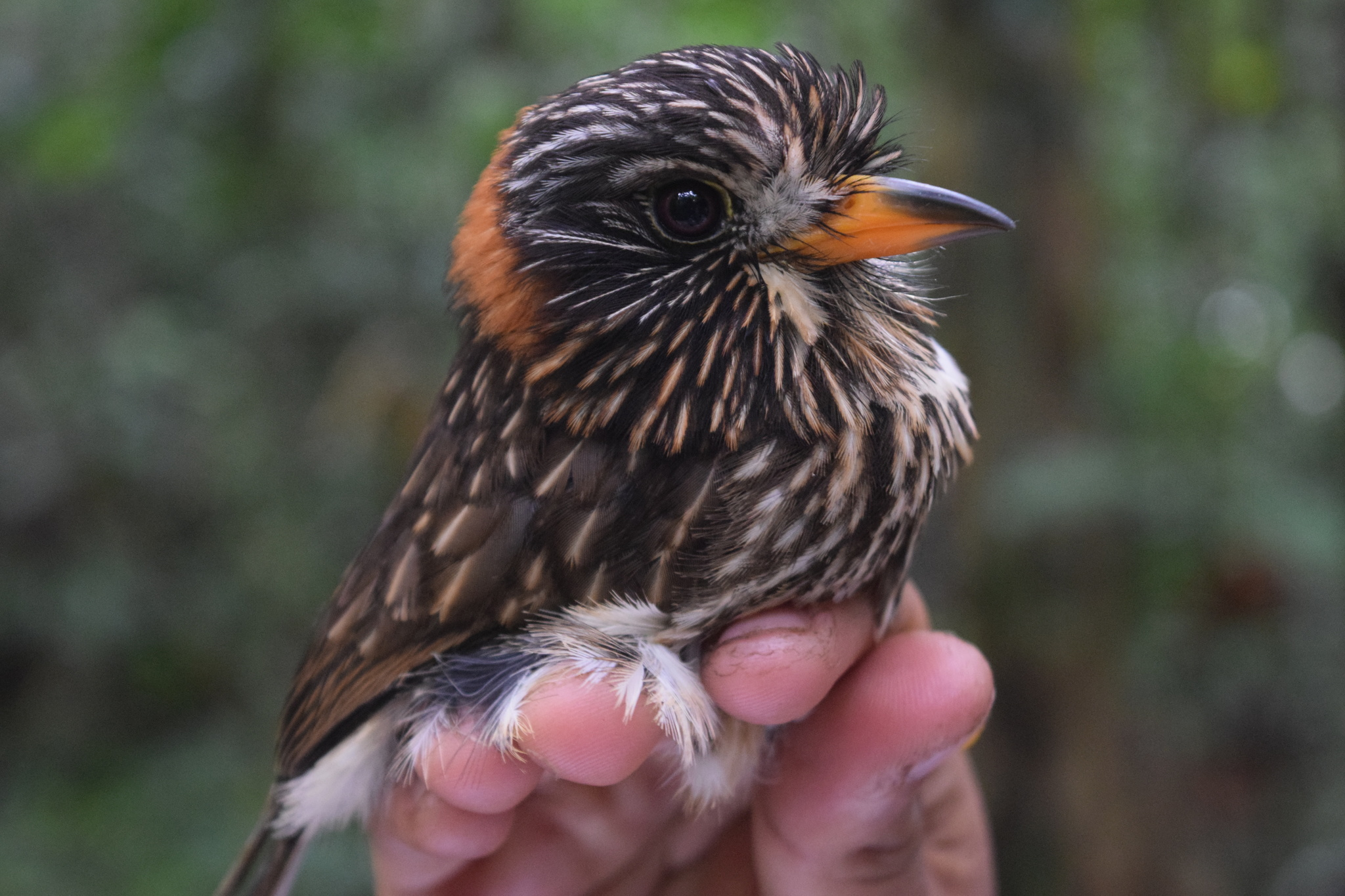

Conservation status
- Least Concern (IUCN 3.1)

Scientific classification
- Kingdom: Animalia
- Phylum: Chordata
- Class: Aves
- Order: Piciformes
- Family: Bucconidae
- Genus: Malacoptila
- Species: M. semicincta

Binomial name
- Malacoptila semicincta Todd, 1925

= Semicollared puffbird =

Species of bird

The semicollared puffbird (Malacoptila semicincta) is a species of bird in the family Bucconidae, the puffbirds, nunlets, and nunbirds. It is one of seven species of the genus Malacoptila. It is found in Bolivia, Brazil, and Peru.

== Taxonomy and systematics ==
The semicollared puffbird and the white-chested puffbird (M. fusca) were for a time considered conspecific but are now treated as a superspecies. It is monotypic.

== Description ==
The semicollared puffbird is about 18 cm (7.1 in) long and weighs about 44 g (1.6 oz). The head and upperparts are blackish brown; pale shafts to the feathers give a streaked appearance. Its tail is brown. It has a whitish "whisker" and chin and a thin white crescent across the upper breast. The back of the neck has a rufous "collar". The underparts are whitish with blackish streaks on the lower breast and flanks. The bill is mostly black above and yellow-orange below, the eye dark red with a white ring around it, and the feet pale greenish pink.

== Distribution and habitat ==
The semicollared puffbird is found in western Amazonia where far western Brazil, southeastern Peru, and far northern Bolivia meet. It inhabits transitional forest and the edges of humid tropical evergreen terra firme forest, usually from the undergrowth up to the lower mid-story. In elevation it ranges from near sea level to 1,050 m (3,400 ft).

== Behavior ==
=== Feeding ===
The semicollared puffbird's feeding behavior and diet have not been documented.

=== Breeding ===
The semicollared puffbird's breeding phenology has not been documented.

=== Vocalization ===
The semicollared puffbird's song is a "series of thin, rather high-pitched, melancholy, descending 'Fééeur' or 'pseuu' whistles, each at first widely spaced...and starting on the same pitch; then dropping in pitch, 'pseuu-uuu-uuu'."

== Status ==
The IUCN has assessed the semicollared puffbird as being of Least Concern, though its population is unknown and is believed to be decreasing. It occurs in one protected are in Peru.
