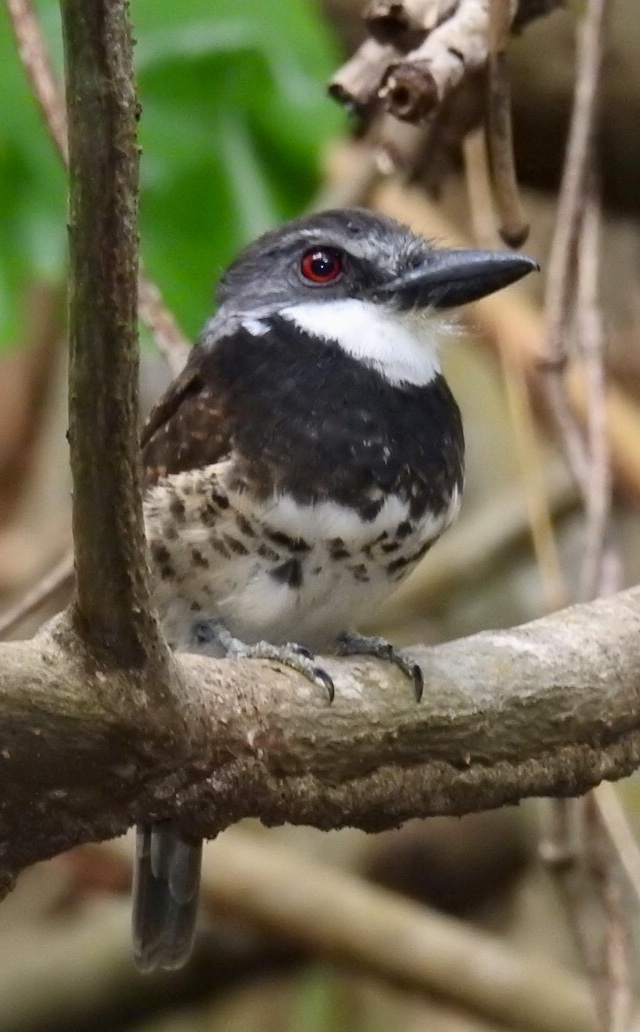

Conservation status
- Near Threatened (IUCN 3.1)

Scientific classification
- Kingdom: Animalia
- Phylum: Chordata
- Class: Aves
- Order: Piciformes
- Family: Bucconidae
- Genus: Bucco
- Species: B. noanamae

Binomial name
- Bucco noanamae Hellmayr, 1909

Synonyms
- Nystactes noanamae

= Sooty-capped puffbird =

Species of bird

The sooty-capped puffbird (Bucco noanamae) is a species of bird in the family Bucconidae, the puffbirds, nunlets, and nunbirds. It is endemic to Colombia.

== Taxonomy and systematics ==
Some authors placed the sooty-capped puffbird in genus Nystactes during the first half of the 20th century, but it was returned to Bucco by most classifications after that. The International Ornithological Committee (IOC) and the Clements taxonomy retain it there. However, BirdLife International's Handbook of the Birds of the World placed it back into Nystactes. To further complicate matters, a 2020 publication proposed that genus Tamatia has precedence over Nystactes. The sooty-capped puffbird and the spotted puffbird (B. tamatia) are closely related and may form a superspecies. The sooty-capped puffbird is monotypic.

== Description ==
The sooty-capped puffbird is about 18 cm (7.1 in) long. Its crown and nape are blackish to grayish black. It has a bold white supercilium that grays to the rear and a wide black line through and below the eye. Its upperparts and rather short tail are dark brown. It has a white chin, a wide black band across the chest, and a buffy white belly and vent with black scallops. The bill is black, the eye red, and the feet pale gray.

== Distribution and habitat ==
The sooty-capped puffbird is found only along the coast of Colombia from the Gulf of Urabá south to the San Juan River. It inhabits humid and wet primary and secondary forest and nearby unforested areas. It also occurs in scrublands. In all areas it tends to stay low in the vegetation. In elevation it ranges from sea level to 100 m (330 ft).

== Behavior ==
=== Feeding ===
The sooty-capped puffbird hunts by sallying from a low perch to pluck large insects from foliage. Other details of its diet are not known.

=== Breeding ===
The one known nest of a sooty-capped puffbird was in an arboreal termitarium. Both parents delivered food into it.

=== Vocalization ===
The sooty-capped puffbird's song is "a long series of 20-40 whistles, starting almost at a trilling pace, then becoming more drawn-out and accentuated".

== Status ==
The IUCN has assessed the sooty-capped puffbird as Near Threatened. Its population is declining "moderately rapidly" because of habitat losses primarily to logging and conversion to agriculture, but human settlement and cattle ranching also contribute.
