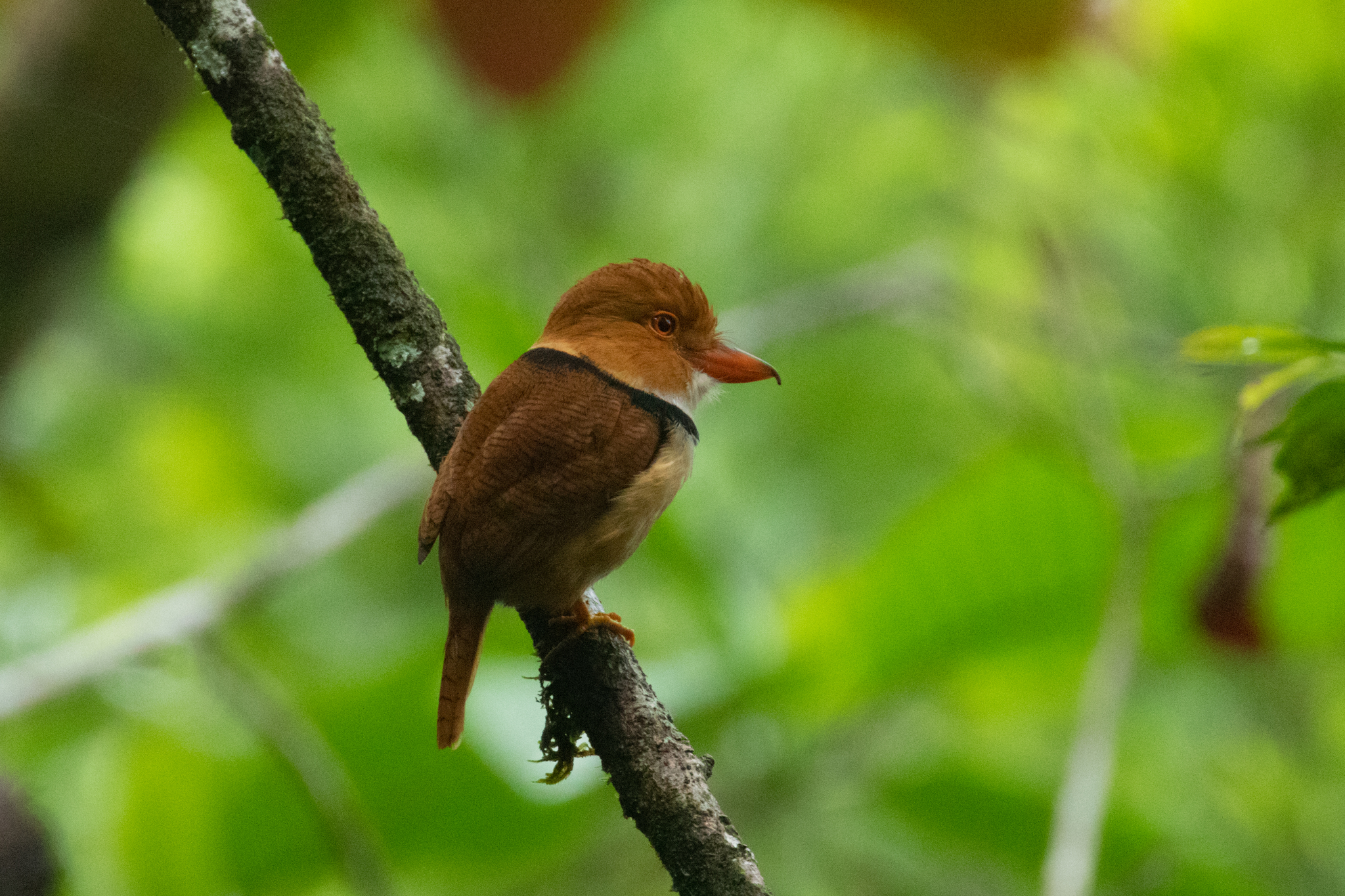

Conservation status
- Least Concern (IUCN 3.1)

Scientific classification
- Kingdom: Animalia
- Phylum: Chordata
- Class: Aves
- Order: Piciformes
- Family: Bucconidae
- Genus: Bucco
- Species: B. capensis

Binomial name
- Bucco capensis Linnaeus, 1766

= Collared puffbird =

Species of bird

The collared puffbird (Bucco capensis) is a species of bird in the family Bucconidae, the puffbirds, nunlets, and nunbirds. It is found in Bolivia, Brazil, Colombia, Ecuador, French Guiana, Guyana, Peru, Suriname, and Venezuela.

== Taxonomy and systematics ==
In 1760 the French zoologist Mathurin Jacques Brisson included a description of the collared puffbird in his Ornithologie that was based on a specimen collected in French Guiana. He used the French name Le barbu and the Latin name Bucco. Although Brisson coined Latin names, these do not conform to the binomial system and are not recognised by the International Commission on Zoological Nomenclature. When in 1766 the Swedish naturalist Carl Linnaeus updated his Systema Naturae for the twelfth edition he added 240 species that had been previously described by Brisson. One of these was the collared puffbird. Linnaeus included a terse description, coined the binomial name Bucco capensis, and cited Brisson's work. The specific epithet capensis denotes the Cape of Good Hope where Linnaeus mistakenly believed the birds occurred.

The collared puffbird is currently (2021) treated as monotypic. The population in the western part of its range has been suggested as a subspecies, Bucco capensis dugandi, but most authorities do not accept it.

== Description ==
The collared puffbird is about 19 cm (7.5 in) long and weighs 46 to 62 g (1.6 to 2.2 oz). Its head and back are dark rufous, the rump a lighter rufous, and the tail orange-chestnut with narrow black bars. The folded wing shows fine black barring on a brown background. The chin and throat are white to buffy white that extend around the nape as a thin buffy line. Below them are a wide black collar that encircles the chest and upper back. The lower breast and the center of the belly are buffy white that darkens to dull orange on the flanks and vent. The eye is surrounded by bare orange-yellow skin; the eye color can be whitish, orange, or vermilion. The bill is mostly orange with some dusky on the maxilla. The feet can be light green, orange, or brown.

== Distribution and habitat ==
The collared puffbird is found in most of the Amazon Basin, from southeastern Colombia south through eastern Ecuador and Peru to northern Bolivia and east through southern Venezuela, the Guianas, and northern Brazil. In Brazil it is found as far east as Belém and south into Mato Grosso. It inhabits humid primary terra firme forest, drier hilly country, and also várzea forest in the lower Amazon. In elevation it ranges from sea level to 1,700 m (5,600 ft) but is usually found below 1,000 m (3,300 ft).

== Behavior ==
=== Feeding ===
The collared puffbird hunts by sallying from a shaded perch to pluck prey from foliage, bark, or the forest floor. Its prey includes lizards, snakes, frogs, and several types of large insects. It sometimes joins mixed-species foraging flocks and less often follows army ant swarms.

=== Breeding ===
The collared puffbird's breeding season spans at least May to September. It lays its two glossy white eggs in a cavity excavated in an arboreal termitarium or rotted tree trunk.

=== Vocalization ===
The collared puffbird's song is "a repeated, brisk, mewing 'cua-will, cua-will…' or 'awww awwAWW-chaw awwAWW-chaw awwAWW-chaw'", and is mainly given at or just before dawn. It is frequently sung as a duet.

== Status ==
The IUCN has assessed the collared puffbird as being of Least Concern. It has an extremely large range; however, its population has not been quantified and is believed to be decreasing. It is considered common in much of Brazil and rare to uncommon in the western part of its range. It occurs in several protected areas but seems to be highly sensitive to habitat disturbance outside of them.
