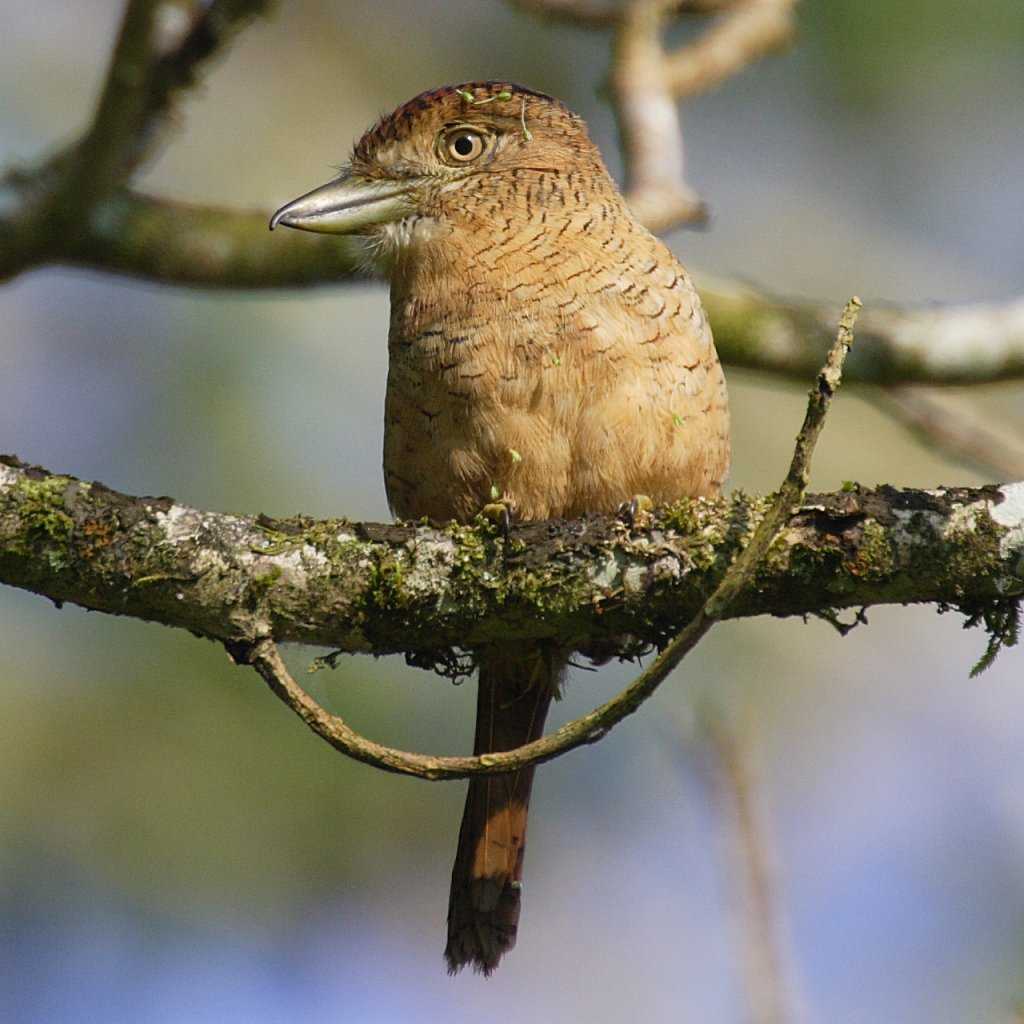

Conservation status
- Least Concern (IUCN 3.1)

Scientific classification
- Kingdom: Animalia
- Phylum: Chordata
- Class: Aves
- Order: Piciformes
- Family: Bucconidae
- Genus: Nystalus
- Species: N. radiatus

Binomial name
- Nystalus radiatus (Sclater, PL, 1854)

Synonyms
- Ecchaunornis radiatus

= Barred puffbird =

Species of bird

The barred puffbird (Nystalus radiatus) is a species of bird in the family Bucconidae, the puffbirds, nunlets, and nunbirds. It is found in Panama, Colombia and Ecuador.

== Taxonomy and systematics ==
In the first half of the twentieth century the barred puffbird was treated by some authors as belonging to genus Ecchaunornis, but since then was returned to genus Nystalus. It is monotypic. A proposed subspecies, "N. r. fulvidus" is probably a color morph.

== Description ==
The barred puffbird is about 22 cm (8.7 in) long and weighs about 63 g (2.2 oz). Its crown is blackish with dark rufous bars. The upper nape is black, the lower nape yellowish red, and the upper mantle black. The rest of the upperparts and the wings are dark chestnut with narrow black bands. The tail is long, narrow, and chestnut with narrow black bands. The chin is whitish. The face and underparts are pale rufous with fine blackish bars except in the center of the belly. The bill is grayish yellow to blackish, the eye creamy yellow, and the feet greenish gray. The "fulvidus" morph is a deeper rufous overall.

== Distribution and habitat ==
The barred puffbird is resident from central Panama into northern Colombia and through western Colombia into western Ecuador. It inhabits the lower levels of several semi-open landscapes including the borders of humid and wet forest, streamside vegetation, clearings with scattered trees, and the edges of forest trails. In Ecuador it has regularly been recorded perched on wires in agricultural areas. In elevation it is usually found up to 900 m (3,000 ft) but has been recorded locally in the Mindo, Ecuador region as high as 1,675 m (5,500 ft) and once at 1,550 m (5,100 ft) in Colombia.

== Behavior ==
=== Feeding ===
The barred puffbird's foraging behavior has not been documented; other puffbirds typically hunt by sallying from a perch. Its diet includes large insects of several orders and small lizards.

=== Breeding ===
The only described nest of a barred puffbird was a cup of dead leaves. It was in a spherical chamber at the end of a narrow tunnel excavated in a clay bank and partially shaded by vegetation. It contained two well-grown nestlings.

=== Vocalization ===
The barred puffbird's song is "a long, slow, ventriloquial and very human-like wolf-whistle, 'phweeeeeet-weeeeeeuuuu'". Near the nest it made low-pitched "werr" and "werr werr woo" calls.

== Status ==
The IUCN has assessed the barred puffbird as being of Least Concern. Its population is estimated at at least 50,000 mature individuals but is believed to be decreasing. It occurs in several protected areas in Colombia and Ecuador.
