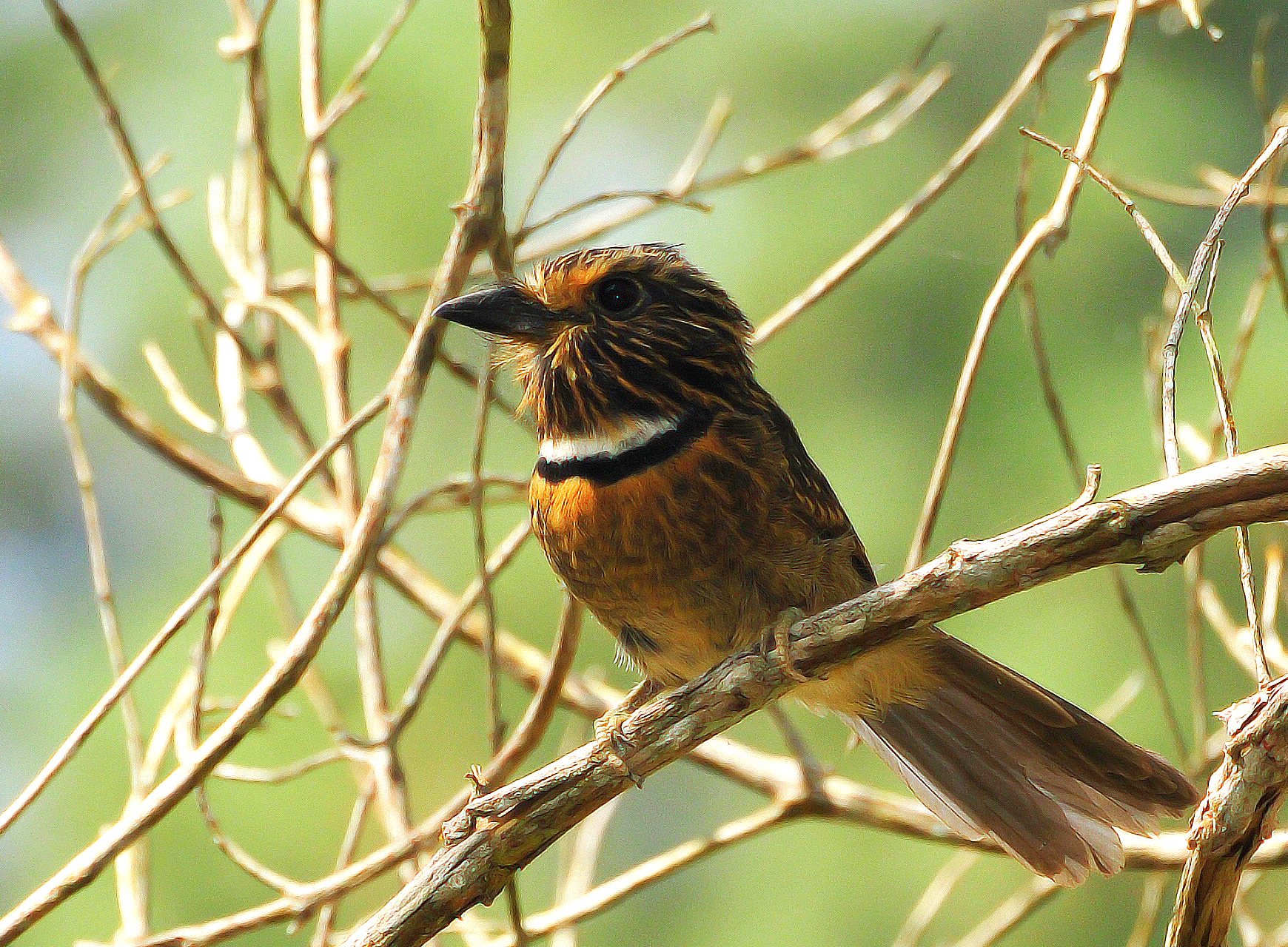

Conservation status
- Least Concern (IUCN 3.1)

Scientific classification
- Kingdom: Animalia
- Phylum: Chordata
- Class: Aves
- Order: Piciformes
- Family: Bucconidae
- Genus: Malacoptila
- Species: M. striata

Binomial name
- Malacoptila striata (Spix, 1824)

Synonyms
- Malacoptila torquata

= Crescent-chested puffbird =

Species of bird

The crescent-chested puffbird (Malacoptila striata) is a species of bird in the family Bucconidae, the puffbirds, nunlets, and nunbirds. It is endemic to Brazil.

== Taxonomy and systematics ==
The crescent-chested puffbird was for a time called Malacoptila torquata but since the mid-1900s it has borne its current binomial. The South American Classification Committee of the American Ornithological Society (SACC), the International Ornithological Committee (IOC), and the Clements taxonomy treat it as having two subspecies, the nominate M. s. striata and M. s. minor. However, BirdLife International's Handbook of the Birds of the World (HBW) treat those entities as separate species, the greater and lesser crescent-chested puffbirds respectively.

== Description ==
The crescent-chested puffbird is 17.5 to 20 cm (6.9 to 7.9 in) long. The nominate M. s. striata weighs from about 40 to 47 g (1.4 to 1.7 oz); M. s. minor is smaller. The nominate's head and upperparts are blackish with buffy streaks. The face is rufous around the bill and has a buffy or white "moustache". The wing is brown with buffy markings; the tail is plain dark brown. The upper breast has a white crescent with a black band below it. The lower breast is rufous, the center of the belly whitish, and the sides of the breast and belly dull brown with buffy scallops. M. s. minor has a brighter breastband and its underparts are whiter without barring.

== Distribution and habitat ==
The crescent-chested puffbird's nominate subspecies is found in southeastern Brazil from Bahia and Minas Gerais south to Paraná and Santa Catarina. M. s. minor is found in a small disjunct range in Maranhão and Piauí states in Brazili's Northeast Region. The species inhabits a variety of semi-open landscapes such as the edges of humid lowland forest, logged forest, and secondary forest. It often occurs along roads and at the edges of clearings but rarely in the forest interior. In elevation it ranges from sea level to 2,100 m (6,890 ft).

== Behavior ==
=== Feeding ===
The crescent-chested puffbird appears to be a mostly solitary forager though there are reports of it following army ant swarms with other birds. Its diet is not well documented but is believed to be mostly invertebrates.

=== Breeding ===
The crescent-chested puffbird's nominate subspecies breeds at least from October to December or January. The two known nests were in burrows excavated in earthen banks, but details of its breeding phenology, the nest itself, and eggs are lacking.

=== Vocalization ===
The crescent-chested puffbird's song is "a high-pitched whistle of 10+ notes, like a small tyrannid, bieh, bieh, bieh…." Its alarm call is "a high, thin, descending seeee...".

== Status ==
The IUCN follows HBW taxonomy and so has treated the two subspecies of crescent-chested puffbird as separate species. The organization has assessed the "greater" M. s. striata as being of Least Concern. Its estimated population exceeds 72,000 mature individuals but the number is believed to be decreasing. It has assessed the "lesser" M. s. minor as Endangered due to increasing deforestation in its rather small range. Its population is unknown and believed to be decreasing.
