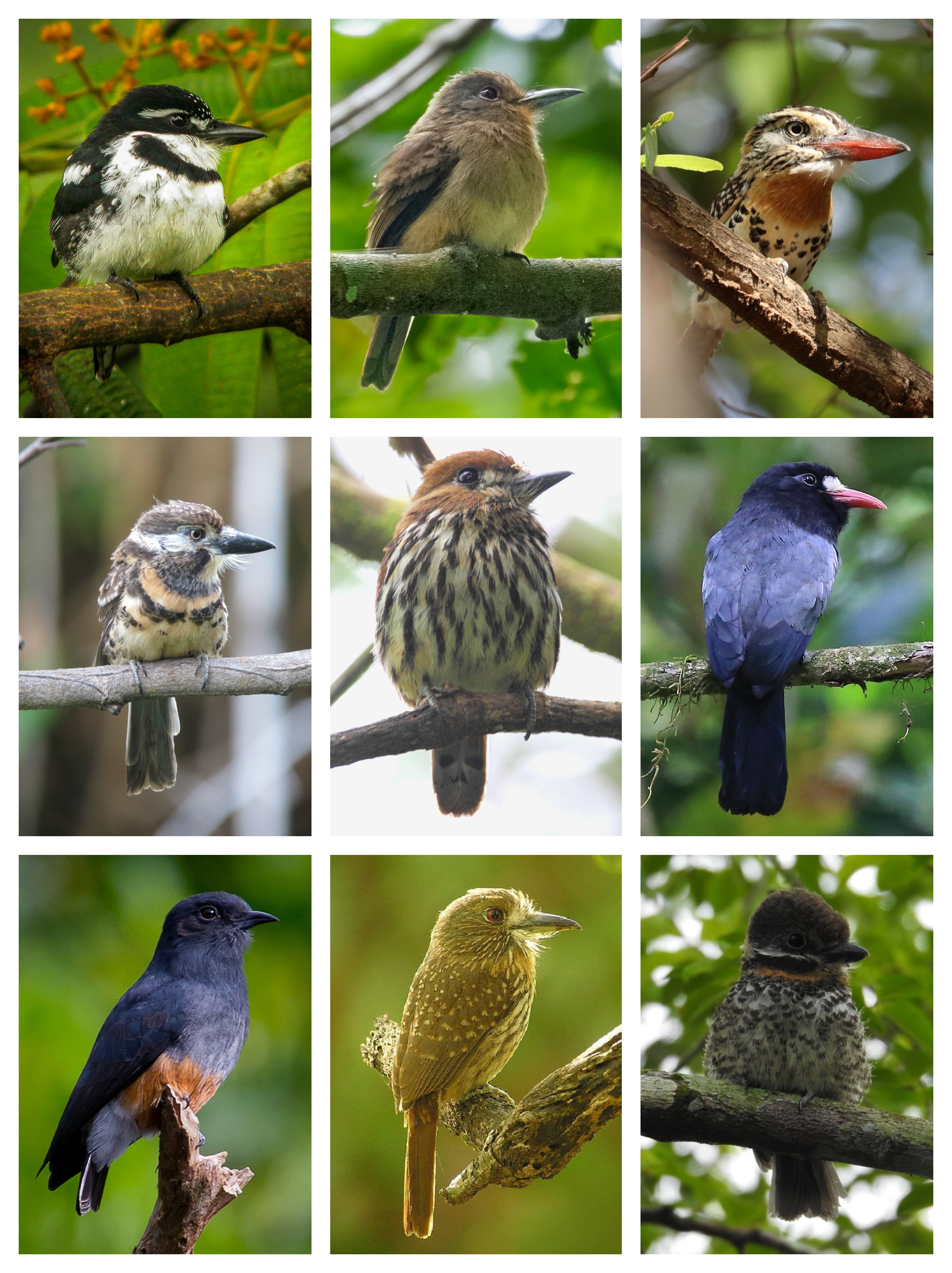

Scientific classification
- Domain: Eukaryota
- Kingdom: Animalia
- Phylum: Chordata
- Class: Aves
- Order: Piciformes
- Suborder: Galbuli
- Family: Bucconidae; Horsfield, 1821

Genera
- Bucco; Notharchus; Nystalus; Hypnelus; Micromonacha; Nonnula; Hapaloptila; Chelidoptera; Malacoptila; Monasa

= Puffbird =

Puffbirds and allies

Family of birds

The puffbirds and their relatives in the family Bucconidae are tropical tree-dwelling insectivorous birds that are found from South America up to Mexico. Together with their closest relatives, the jacamars, they form a divergent lineage within the order Piciformes, though the two families are sometimes elevated to a separate order Galbuliformes. Lacking the iridescent colours of the jacamars, puffbirds are mainly brown, rufous or grey, with large heads, large eyes, and flattened bills with a hooked tip. Their loose, abundant plumage and short tails makes them look stout and puffy, giving rise to the English name of the family. The species range in size from the rufous-capped nunlet, at 13 cm (5.1 in) and 14 g (0.49 oz), to the white-necked puffbird, at up to 29 cm (11 in) and 106 g (3.7 oz).

== Taxonomy ==
Puffbirds get their common name from their fluffy plumage. In Spanish, they have been nicknamed bobo ("dummy") from their propensity to sit motionless waiting for prey. American naturalist Thomas Horsfield defined the Bucconidae in 1821. The family was classified as part of the Piciformes by Alexander Wetmore in his work A Systematic Classification for the Birds of the World (1930, revised in 1951 and 1960). The placement of the combined puffbird and jacamar lineage was in question, with some bone and muscle features suggesting they may be more closely related to the Coraciiformes. Analysis of nuclear DNA in a 2003 study placed them as sister group to the rest of the Piciformes, also showing that the groups had developed zygodactyl feet (two toes facing forward and two aft) before separating. Per Ericson and colleagues, in analysing genomic DNA, confirmed that puffbirds and jacamars were sister groups and their place in Piciformes. The lineage is sometimes elevated to order level as Galbuliformes, first proposed by Sibley and Ahlquist in 1990.

The phylogenetic relationship between the puffbirds and the eight other families that make up the order Piciformes is shown in the cladogram below. The number of species in each family is taken from the list maintained by Frank Gill, Pamela C. Rasmussen and David Donsker on behalf of the International Ornithological Committee (IOC).

- Piciformes
  - Galbuli
    - Galbulidae – jacamars (18 species)
    - Bucconidae – puffbirds (38 species)
  - Pici
    - Picides
      - Indicatoridae – honeyguides (16 species)
      - Picidae – woodpeckers (240 species)
    - Ramphastides
      - Megalaimidae – Asian barbets (35 species)
      - - Lybiidae – African barbets (42 species)
        - - Capitonidae – New World barbets (15 species)
          - - Semnornithidae – toucan barbets (2 species)
            - Ramphastidae – toucans (43 species)

Molecular investigation of the Bucconidae in 2004 indicated that the nunlets (genus Nonnula) diverged from the common ancestor of other puffbirds an estimated 25 million years ago, with the genus Malacoptila the next to branch off around 19.1 million years ago. A fossil right wing recovered from Lower Eocene beds in Lincoln County, Wyoming, was initially classified as a puffbird and given the name Primobucco mcgrewi. The discovery of more complete specimens, including twelve in 2010, shows that Primobucco was instead an early type of roller.

== Distribution and habitat ==
Puffbirds are found from Mexico to southern Brazil, with the greatest variety of species found in the Amazon Basin. They live in forested or wooded habitats, including lowland, foothills, and open woodland. The white-faced nunbird is the only member of this species known to live in highlands. The swallow-winged puffbird also lives in more open country. No species of puffbirds have been recorded of moving any significant distance beyond its home territory.

== Description ==
Generally dull-plumaged birds, puffbirds may have brightly colored bills, eyebrows and irises. They have large heads, short wings and strong bills, with short legs and diminutive feet. There is some sexual dimorphism; the female is slightly larger and slightly duller-plumaged than the male. Juvenile birds have shorter beaks.

=== Voice ===
Puffbirds are one of the most silent birds in the Neotropics and vocalize very rarely. The most vocal species are the nunbirds and those in the genus Nystalus. When calling they mostly do so at dawn and dusk. The main vocalizations consist of repeated and high-pitched whistles. The nunbirds are the most vocal of the family; they have a wide repertoire of calls and often give very loud shouts.

== Behavior ==
Puffbirds are by nature arboreal. Mostly secretive, they are found singly or in small family groups. Species of the genus Monasa, known as nunbirds, are more gregarious and found in flocks.

=== Feeding ===
Puffbirds are sit-and-wait hunters, perching unmoving for long periods, while watching for insect prey. As well as arthropods, they may eat small lizards and plant material. Arthropod exoskeletons are regurgitated as pellets. The swallow-winged puffbird is the only member in the family that is known to capture insects from open perches.

=== Breeding ===
The breeding behaviour of puffbirds is not well known. Nests are burrows in dirt, rotten wood or termite mounds. Puffbirds are known to lay clutches of two or three eggs. The eggs are round, small, and white. The incubation period is around 15 days, and performed by both parents. Born blind and naked, the young can crawl to the entrance of the nest burrow at one or two days of age. There, their mother feeds them partly chewed insects. They fledge at around 20 to 21 days.

== Species ==
Image	Genus	Living Species
	Notharchus	Guianan puffbird, Notharchus macrorhynchos; White-necked puffbird, Notharchus hyperrynchus; Black-breasted puffbird, Notharchus pectoralis; Brown-banded puffbird, Notharchus ordii; Pied puffbird, Notharchus tectus; Buff-bellied puffbird, Notharchus swainsoni
	Bucco	Chestnut-capped puffbird, Bucco macrodactylus; Spotted puffbird, Bucco tamatia; Sooty-capped puffbird, Bucco noanamae; Collared puffbird, Bucco capensis
	Nystalus	Barred puffbird, Nystalus radiatus; White-eared puffbird, Nystalus chacuru; Eastern striolated puffbird, Nystalus striolatus; Western striolated puffbird, Nystalus obamai; Caatinga puffbird, Nystalus maculatus; Chaco puffbird, Nystalus striatipectus
	Hypnelus	Russet-throated puffbird, Hypnelus ruficollis; Two-banded puffbird, Hypnelus bicinctus
	Malacoptila	White-chested puffbird, Malacoptila fusca; Semicollared puffbird, Malacoptila semicincta; Crescent-chested puffbird, Malacoptila striata; Black-streaked puffbird, Malacoptila fulvogularis; Rufous-necked puffbird, Malacoptila rufa; White-whiskered puffbird, Malacoptila panamensis; Moustached puffbird, Malacoptila mystacalis
	Micromonacha	Lanceolated monklet, Micromonacha lanceolata
	Nonnula– the nunlets	Fulvous-chinned nunlet, Nonnula sclateri; Rusty-breasted nunlet, Nonnula rubecula; Brown nunlet, Nonnula brunnea; Grey-cheeked nunlet, Nonnula frontalis; Rufous-capped nunlet, Nonnula ruficapilla; Chestnut-headed nunlet, Nonnula amaurocephala
	Hapaloptila	White-faced nunbird, Hapaloptila castanea
	Monasa– the nunbirds	Black nunbird, Monasa atra; Black-fronted nunbird, Monasa nigrifrons; White-fronted nunbird, Monasa morphoeus; Yellow-billed nunbird, Monasa flavirostris
	Chelidoptera	Swallow-winged puffbird, Chelidoptera tenebrosa
