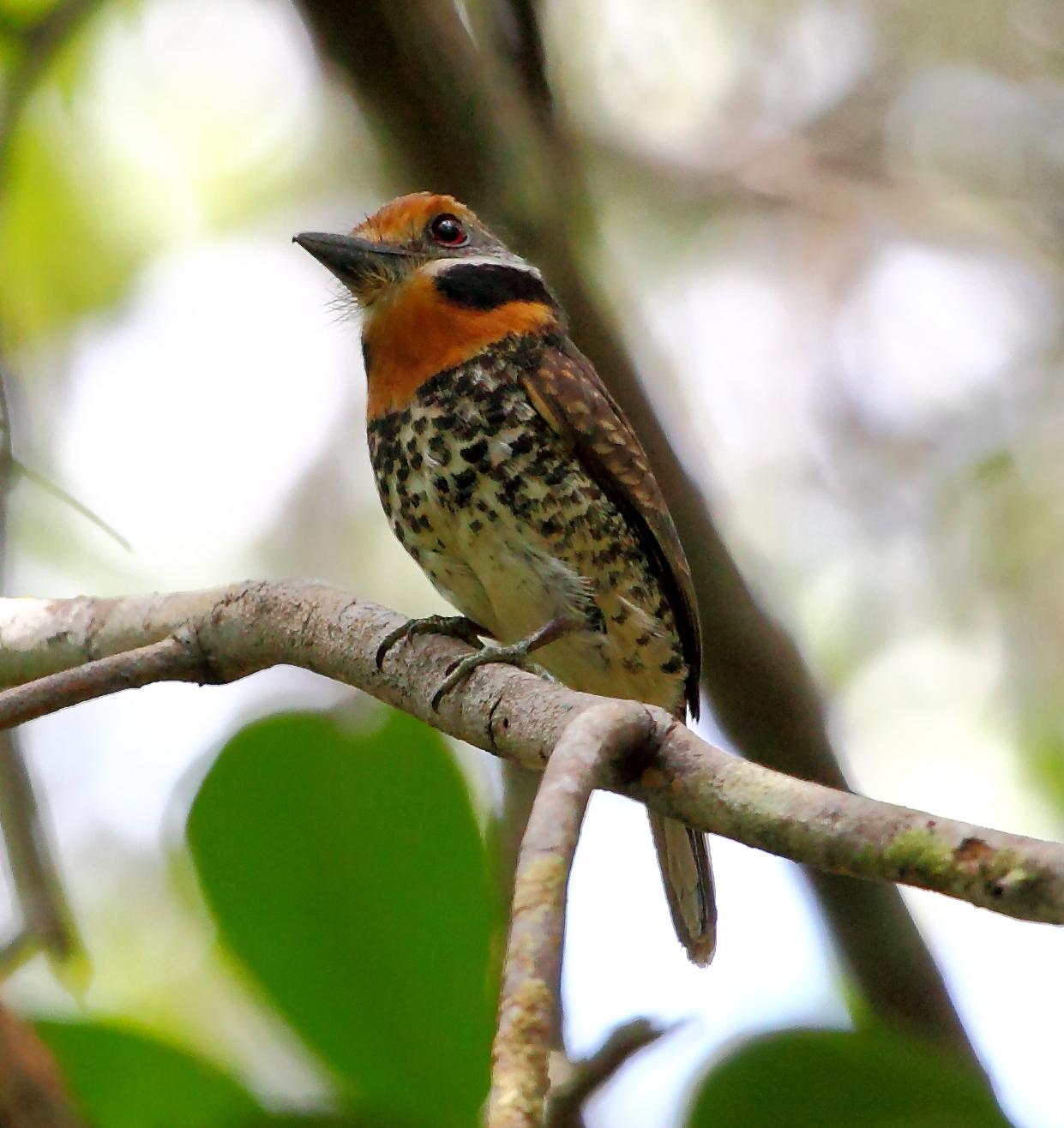
- Spotted puffbird at Presidente Figueiredo, Amazonas state, Brazil

Conservation status
- Least Concern (IUCN 3.1)

Scientific classification
- Domain: Eukaryota
- Kingdom: Animalia
- Phylum: Chordata
- Class: Aves
- Order: Piciformes
- Family: Bucconidae
- Genus: Bucco
- Species: B. tamatia

Binomial name
- Bucco tamatia Gmelin, JF, 1788

Synonyms
- Nystactes tamatia

= Spotted puffbird =

Species of bird

The spotted puffbird (Bucco tamatia) is a species of puffbird in the family Bucconidae, the puffbirds, nunlets, and nunbirds. It is found in Bolivia, Brazil, Colombia, Ecuador, French Guiana, Guyana, Peru, Suriname, and Venezuela.

== Taxonomy ==
The spotted puffbird was described in 1648 by the German naturalist Georg Marcgrave in his Historia Naturalis Brasiliae. In his Latin text Marcgrave used the name Tamatia Brasiliensibus where tamatia was the local name for the bird in the Tupi language. Later ornithologists such as Francis Willughby in 1678 and John Ray in 1713 based their own description on that by Marcgrave. In 1780 the French polymath Comte de Buffon described and illustrated Le Tamatia from a specimen that had been collected in Cayenne, French Guiana. When the German naturalist Johann Friedrich Gmelin revised and expanded Carl Linnaeus's Systema Naturae in 1788 he included the spotted puffbird and cited the works by the earlier ornithologists. He placed the species with the other puffbirds in the genus Bucco and coined the binomial name Bucco tamatia.

The spotted puffbird has sometimes been placed in the genus Nystactes. It is closely related to the sooty-capped puffbird (B. noanamae).

Three subspecies are recognised:

- B. t. pulmentum Sclater, PL, 1856 – south Colombia to northeast Bolivia
- B. t. tamatia Gmelin, JF, 1788 – east Colombia, Venezuela, the Guianas and north Brazil
- B. t. hypnaleus (Cabanis & Heine, 1863) – central east Brazil

== Description ==
The spotted puffbird is about 18 cm (7.1 in) long and weighs 33 to 42 g (1.2 to 1.5 oz). The nominate subspecies has a pale rufous forehead that becomes rufous spots on a dark brown background on the crown. Below that is a blackish band through the eye, below that a white stripe, and below that a black patch. The white stripe continues around the nape. The upperparts and wings are dark brown with some buffy scallops and the tail is dark brown with some buffy edges to the feathers. The chin is white, the throat rufous, the breast and flanks whitish with black spots and scales, and the belly and vent white with small black spots. The bill is black, the eye bright red, and the feet dark gray or greenish. B. t. pulmentum's throat is much paler than the nominate's, the forehead brighter, and the spotting heavier. B. t. hypnaleus is larger than the nominate but with a smaller bill, and the spotting on its underside is heavier especially on the breast.

The spotted puffbird's song is "a series of 10–20 soft, whistled 'chyoi' or 'puwéep' notes (c. 2 per second), weak and hesitant at first, then a few at lower pitch and slower, ending with c. 4 inflected 'pchooii, pchooii, pchooii, peejowee' whistles". It is usually sung at dawn and sometimes sung as a duet. It also makes "faint wheezy whistles" in a dispute.

== Distribution and habitat ==
The nominate subspecies of spotted puffbird is found from eastern Colombia east through Venezuela and the Guianas into Brazil and south in Brazil to the left (north) bank of the Amazon River. B. t. pulmentum is found from southeastern Colombia south through eastern Ecuador, northeastern Peru, and western Brazil into northeastern Bolivia. B. t. hypnaleus is found in Amazonian Brazil east of the Tapajós River. The species inhabits a variety of somewhat open landscapes such as várzea and igapó forests, mature secondary forest, savanna woodland, and gallery forest. It seldom occurs in the interior of dense forest. In elevation it generally ranges from sea level to 1,400 m (4,600 ft) but in Venezuela it usually occurs below 700 m (2,300 ft).

== Behavior ==
=== Feeding ===
The spotted puffbird usually forages from a low perch, sallying out to pluck prey from foliage or bark. It sometimes follows army ant swarms. Its diet includes many types of insects, other invertebrates such as spiders and scorpions, small lizards, and mistletoe berries.

=== Breeding ===
The spotted puffbird's breeding season varies in different parts of its range, but in general is between March and September. It lays its clutch of two eggs in a chamber excavated in arboreal termitaria.

== Status ==
The IUCN has assessed the spotted puffbird as being of Least Concern. However, though it has a very large range, its population has not been quantified and is believed to be decreasing. It is thought to be uncommon in most of its range but is easily overlooked and so might be more abundant. It occurs in several protected areas.
