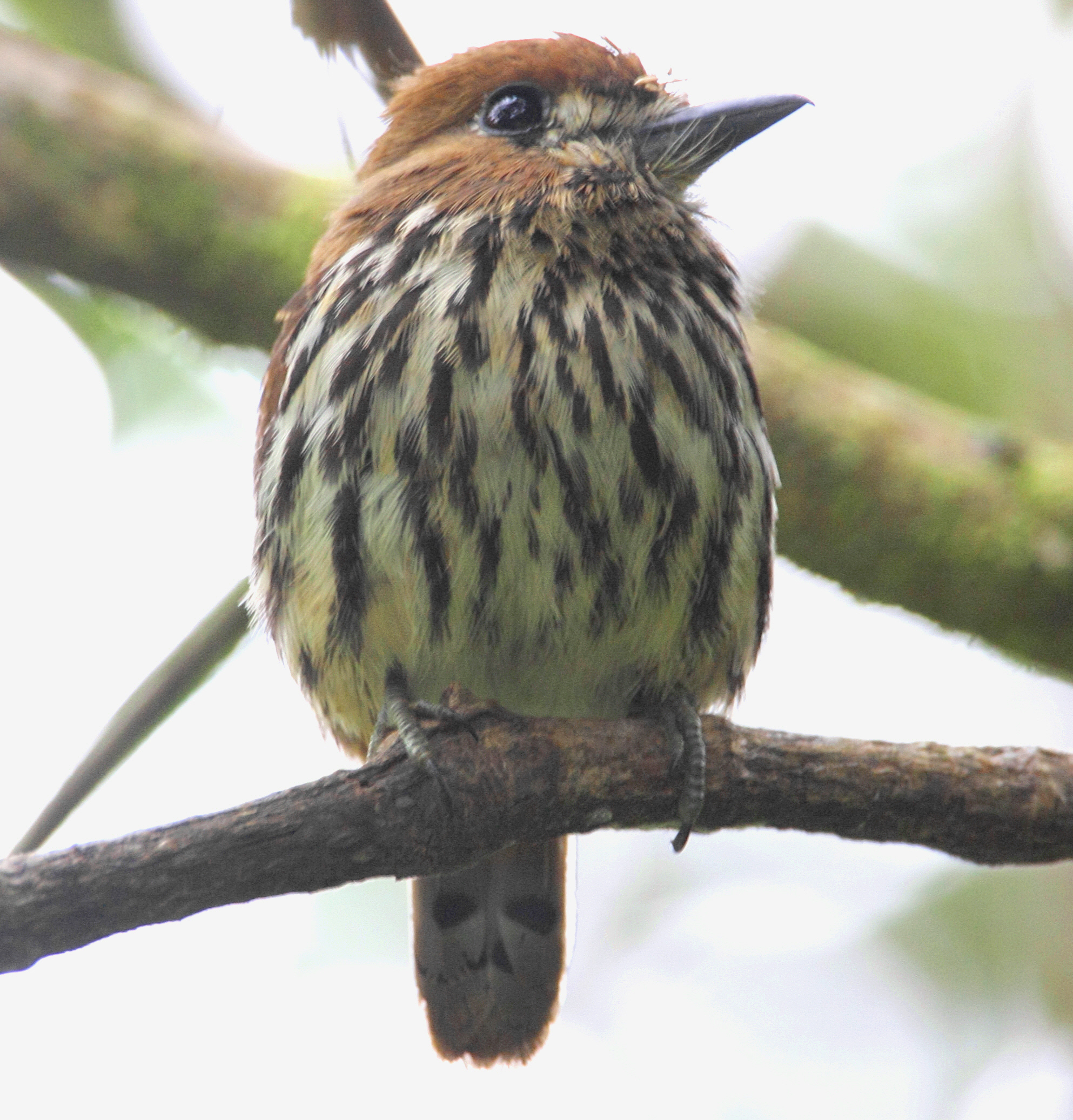
- Peru

Conservation status
- Least Concern (IUCN 3.1)

Scientific classification
- Kingdom: Animalia
- Phylum: Chordata
- Class: Aves
- Order: Piciformes
- Family: Bucconidae
- Genus: Micromonacha; P.L. Sclater, 1881
- Species: M. lanceolata

Binomial name
- Micromonacha lanceolata (Deville, 1849)

= Lanceolated monklet =

Species of bird

The lanceolated monklet (Micromonacha lanceolata) is a species of bird in the family Bucconidae, the puffbirds, nunlets, and nunbirds. It is found in Bolivia, Brazil, Colombia, Costa Rica, Ecuador, Panama, and Peru.

== Taxonomy and systematics ==
The lanceolated monklet is the only member of its genus, and the only bird called a "monklet". It has no subspecies, though the population in Costa Rica and western Panama has been discussed as possibly being one.

== Description ==
The lanceolated monklet is 13 to 15 cm (5.1 to 5.9 in) long and weighs 19 to 22 g (0.67 to 0.78 oz). It is entirely warm brown with scale-like buffy markings above. It has white bristles around the base of the large bill, and white "whiskers", which are actually tufts of feathers. Its lores and a half ring behind the eye are white. The wings and the top side of the tail are dark brown and the tail's underside is gray. Most of its underparts are white with heavy black streaks; the center of the belly is unstreaked and the vent area has an ochre tinge.

== Distribution and habitat ==
The lanceolated monklet is found in several disjunct areas. One is the Caribbean slope in Costa Rica and into west central Panama. Another extends from west central Colombia south to west central Ecuador. The largest area includes eastern Ecuador, southern Colombia, western Brazil, and eastern Peru. It is also found in a few locations in Bolivia. It inhabits a variety of landscapes including the edges and natural clearings of primary and mature secondary forest, small forest patches, shade coffee plantations, and lowland and montane evergreen forest. It tends to occur in the mid- and upper vegetation levels. In elevation it mostly occurs between 300 and 1,500 m (980 and 4,900 ft) but can be found as high as 2,100 m (6,900 ft).

== Behavior ==
=== Feeding ===
The lanceolated monklet hunts from a perch, typically 4 to 8 m (13 to 26 ft) above the ground, and sallies from it for its insect prey. Its diet also includes berries. It sometimes follows mixed-species foraging flocks.

=== Breeding ===
One lanceolated monklet nest was in a chamber at the end of a 40 cm (16 in) long tunnel in an earthen bank. The clutch of two white eggs was laid on dry leaves.

=== Vocalization ===
The lanceolated monklet's song is "1–5 high, thin, plaintive rising whistles, 'sewee ... sewee sewee-sewee-sewee’swee’swee', each slightly higher than preceding one". Its contact call is a "thin, high-pitched 'tsip tsip'".

== Status ==
The IUCN originally assessed the lanceolated monklet in 1988 as Near Threatened but since 2004 has rated it as being of Least Concern. It has a large range and a population estimated at more than 50,000 mature individuals, though the latter is thought to be decreasing. It apparently is rare to fairly common in different parts of its range, but may be underreported because it is difficult to detect.
