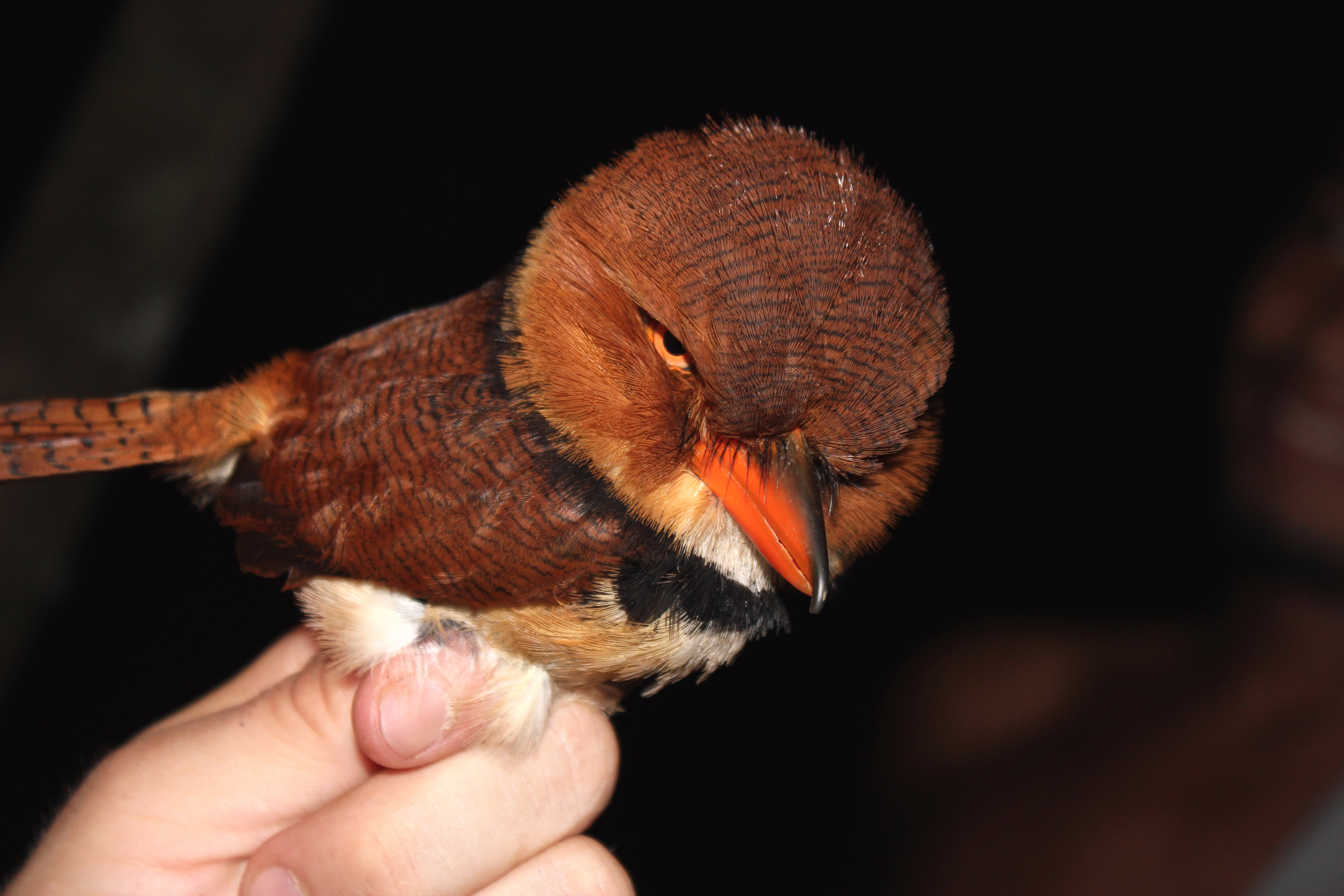
- Collared puffbird (Bucco capensis)

Scientific classification
- Kingdom: Animalia
- Phylum: Chordata
- Class: Aves
- Order: Piciformes
- Family: Bucconidae
- Genus: Bucco; Brisson, 1760

Type species
- Bucco capensis Linnaeus, 1766

Species
- See text

= Bucco =

Genus of birds

Bucco is a genus of birds in the puffbird family Bucconidae. Birds in the genus are native to the Americas.

The genus Bucco was introduced by the French zoologist Mathurin Jacques Brisson in 1760 with the collared puffbird as the type species. The name is from the Latin bucca for "cheek".

== Extant Species ==
The genus contains four species:

Genus Bucco – Brisson, 1760 – four species
Common name	Scientific name and subspecies	Range	Size and ecology	IUCN status and estimated population
Collared puffbird	Bucco capensis Linnaeus, 1766	northern region of South America in the Amazon Basin, southern Colombia and Venezuela, and the Guianas.	Size: Habitat: Diet:	LC
Chestnut-capped puffbird	Bucco macrodactylus (Spix, 1824)	northwestern South America in the western Amazon Basin of Brazil, in Amazonian Venezuela, Colombia, Ecuador, Peru, northern Bolivia, and in the eastern Orinoco River Basin of Venezuela.	Size: Habitat: Diet:	LC
Sooty-capped puffbird	Bucco noanamae Hellmayr, 1909	Colombia.	Size: Habitat: Diet:	NT
Spotted puffbird	Bucco tamatia (Gmelin, JF, 1788) Three subspecies: B. t. pulmentum Sclater, PL, 1856; B. t. tamatia Gmelin, JF, 1788; B. t. hypnaleus (Cabanis & Heine, 1863)	Bolivia, Brazil, Colombia, Ecuador, French Guiana, Guyana, Peru, Suriname, and Venezuela	Size: Habitat: Diet:	LC
