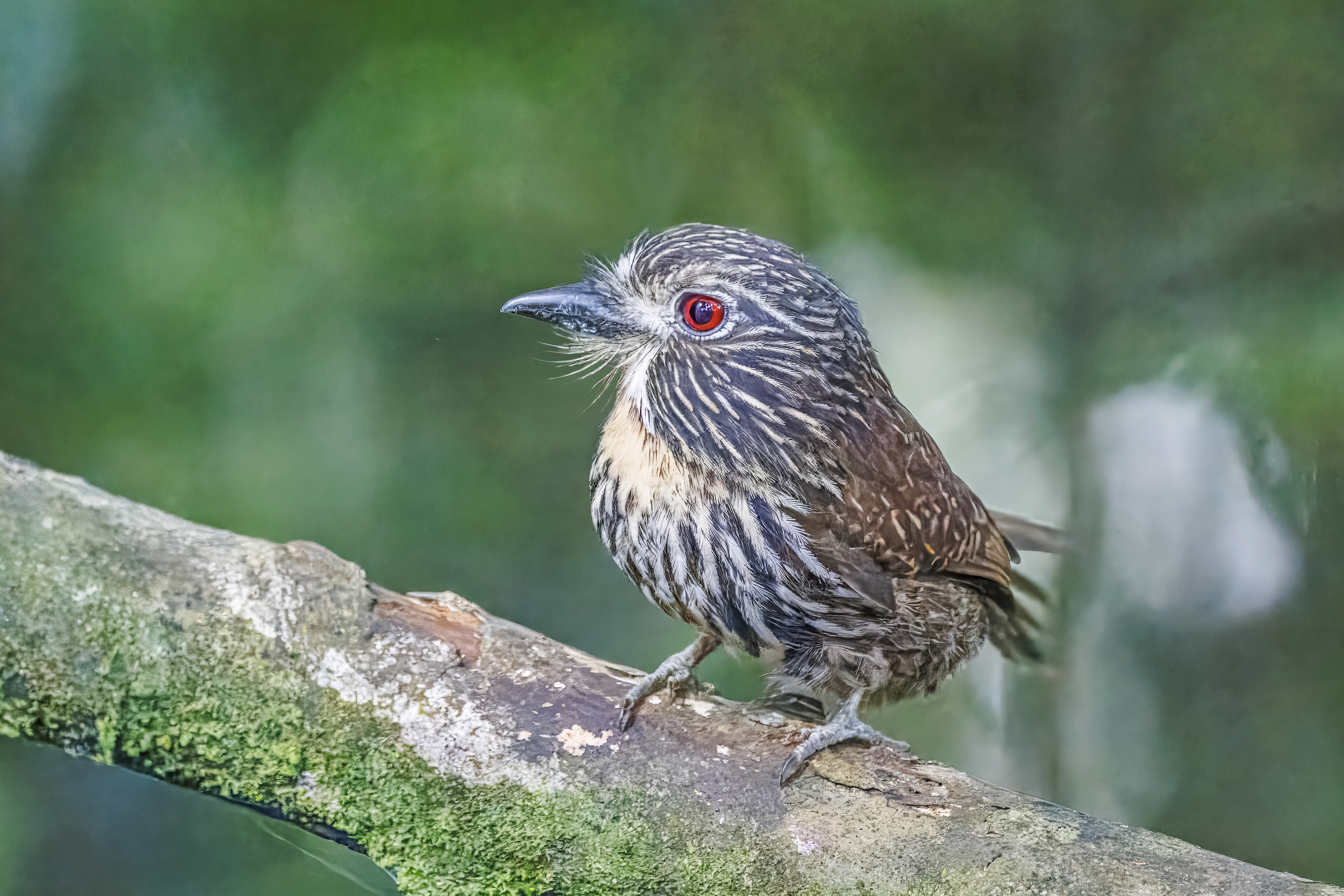
- In Ecuador

Conservation status
- Least Concern (IUCN 3.1)

Scientific classification
- Kingdom: Animalia
- Phylum: Chordata
- Class: Aves
- Order: Piciformes
- Family: Bucconidae
- Genus: Malacoptila
- Species: M. fulvogularis

Binomial name
- Malacoptila fulvogularis Sclater, PL, 1854

= Black-streaked puffbird =

Species of bird

The black-streaked puffbird (Malacoptila fulvogularis) is a species of bird in the family Bucconidae, the puffbirds, nunlets, and nunbirds. It is found in Bolivia, Colombia, Ecuador, and Peru.

== Taxonomy and systematics ==
The International Ornithological Committee (IOC) treats the black-streaked puffbird as monotypic. However, the Clements taxonomy and BirdLife International's Handbook of the Birds of the World (HBW) assign three subspecies, the nominate M. f. fulvogularis, M. f. huilae, and M. f. substriata.

== Description ==
The black-streaked puffbird is 19 to 22 cm (7.5 to 8.7 in) long and weighs about 65 g (2.3 oz). Its head is blackish with thin white streaks and a white spot in front of the eye. Its upperparts are dark brown with thin white streaks on the shoulder becoming buffy triangles on the back. The wings are brown with buffy scallops on the coverts and the tail is solid brown. The throat and upper breast are ochraceous; the lower breast, upper belly, and flanks are striped black and white; and the center of the belly is unmarked dingy whitish. The bill is black, the eye carmine with a white ring around it, and the feet dark.

== Distribution and habitat ==
The black-streaked puffbird is resident on the east slope of the Andes from Colombia through Ecuador and Peru into northwestern Bolivia. "M. f. fulvogularis" occurs from Ecuador south. "M. f. huilae" occurs in the upper Magdalena river valley of south central Colombia. "M. f. substriata" occurs on the east slope of Colombia's Eastern Andes. The species inhabits the understory of several forest types including humid primary and montane forest and open woodland; in Bolivia it also occurs in dry and semi-deciduous forest. In elevation it ranges from 500 to 2,300 m (1,600 to 7,500 ft).

== Behavior ==
=== Feeding ===
The black-streaked puffbird hunts from a perch in the lower or middle strata of the forest; it makes sallies from there to capture its invertebrate prey from branches and leaves. It sometimes follows army ant swarms and joins mixed-species foraging flocks.

=== Breeding ===
No information on the black-streaked puffbird's breeding phenology has been published.

=== Vocalization ===
The black-streaked puffbird's song is "a very high-pitched ascending whistle, lasting under 4 seconds."

== Status ==
The IUCN has assessed the black-streaked puffbird as being of Least Concern, though its population is unknown and believed to be decreasing. No specific threats have been identified. It rare to fairly common in various parts of its range.
