= List of motmots =

Motmots are birds in the family Momotidae in the order Coraciiformes. There are currently 14 extant species of motmots recognised by the International Ornithologists' Union.

== Conventions ==
IUCN Red List categories
Conservation status
- EX: Extinct (0 species)
- EW: Extinct in the wild (0 species)
- CR: Critically endangered (0 species)
- EN: Endangered (0 species)
- VU: Vulnerable (1 species)
- NT: Near threatened (0 species)
- LC: Least concern (13 species)

Conservation status codes listed follow the International Union for Conservation of Nature (IUCN) Red List of Threatened Species. Range maps are provided wherever possible; if a range map is not available, a description of the motmot's range is provided. Ranges are based on the IOC World Bird List for that species unless otherwise noted. Population estimates are of the number of mature individuals and are taken from the IUCN Red List.

This list follows the taxonomic treatment (designation and order of species) and nomenclature (scientific and common names) of version 13.2 of the IOC World Bird List. Where the taxonomy proposed by the IOC World Bird List conflicts with the taxonomy followed by the IUCN (Note: The IUCN follows the taxonomy proposed by the HBW and BirdLife Taxonomic Checklist.) or the 2023 edition of The Clements Checklist of Birds of the World, the disagreement is noted next to the species's common name (for nomenclatural disagreements) or scientific name (for taxonomic disagreements).

== Classification ==
The International Ornithologists' Union (IOU) recognises 14 species of motmots in six genera. This list does not include hybrid species, extinct prehistoric species, or putative species not yet accepted by the IOU.

Family Momotidae

- Genus Hylomanes: one species
- Genus Aspatha: one species
- Genus Momotus: seven species
- Genus Baryphthengus: two species
- Genus Electron: two species
- Genus Eumomota: one species

== Motmots ==
Genus Hylomanes – Lichtenstein, M. H. C., 1839 – 1 species
Common name	Scientific name and subspecies	Range	IUCN status and estimated population
Tody motmot	H. momotula Lichtenstein, M. H. C., 1839 Three subspecies: H. m. chiapensis; H. m. momotula; H. m. obscurus	Southern Mexico to northwestern Colombia	LC 20,000–49,999

Genus Aspatha – Sharpe, 1892 – 1 species
Common name	Scientific name and subspecies	Range	IUCN status and estimated population
Blue-throated motmot	A. gularis (Lafresnaye, 1840)	Southern Mexico to Honduras	LC 20,000–49,999

Genus Momotus – Brisson, 1760 – 7 species
Common name	Scientific name and subspecies	Range	IUCN status and estimated population
Russet-crowned motmot	M. mexicanus Swainson, 1827 Four subspecies: M. m. vanrossemi; M. m. mexicanus; M. m. saturatus; M. m. castaneiceps	Northwestern Mexico to southwestern Guatemala	LC 50,000–499,999
Blue-capped motmot	M. coeruliceps (Gould, 1836)	Northeastern Mexico	LC 20,000–49,999
Lesson's motmot	M. lessonii Lesson, R. P., 1842 Three subspecies: M. l. goldmani; M. l. exiguus; M. l. lessonii	Southern Mexico to western Panama	LC 500,000–4,999,999
Whooping motmot	M. subrufescens Sclater, P. L., 1853 Four subspecies: M. s. subrufescens; M. s. spatha; M. s. osgoodi; M. s. argenticinctus	Central and South America	LC 50,000-499,999
Trinidad motmot	M. bahamensis (Swainson, 1838)	Trinidad and Tobago	LC Unknown
Amazonian motmot	M. momota (Linnaeus, 1766) Nine subspecies: M. m. momota; M. m. microstephanus; M. m. ignobilis; M. m. nattereri; M. m. simplex; M. m. cametensis; M. m. perensis; M. m. marcgravianus; M. m. pilcomajensis	Amazon rainforest	LC Unknown
Andean motmot	M. aequatorialis Gould, 1858 Two subspecies: M. a. aequatorialis; M. a. chlorolaemus	Andes	LC Unknown

Genus Baryphthengus – Cabanis & Heine, 1859 – 2 species
Common name	Scientific name and subspecies	Range	IUCN status and estimated population
Rufous motmot	B. martii (Spix, 1824) Two subspecies: B. m. semirufus; B. m. martii	Central and South America	LC 5,000,000–49,999,999
Rufous-capped motmot	B. ruficapillus (Vieillot, 1818)	Southeastern Brazil, eastern Paraguay and northeastern Argentina	LC Unknown

Genus Electron – Gistel, 1848 – 2 species
Common name	Scientific name and subspecies	Range	IUCN status and estimated population
Keel-billed motmot	E. carinatum (du Bus de Gisignies, 1847)	Southern Mexico to northern Costa Rica	VU 1,500–7,000
Broad-billed motmot	E. platyrhynchum (Leadbeater, 1829) Six subspecies: E. p. minus; E. p. platyrhynchum; E. p. colombianum; E. p. pyrrholaemum; E. p. orienticola; E. p. chlorophrys	Central and South America	LC 500,000–4,999,999

Genus Eumomota – Sclater, P. L., 1858 – 1 species
Common name	Scientific name and subspecies	Range	IUCN status and estimated population
Turquoise-browed motmot	E. superciliosa (Sandbach, 1837) Seven subspecies: E. s. bipartita; E. s. superciliosa; E. s. vanrossemi; E. s. sylvestris; E. s. apiaster; E. s. euroaustris; E. s. australis	Southern Mexico to northwestern Costa Rica	LC 500,000–4,999,999
