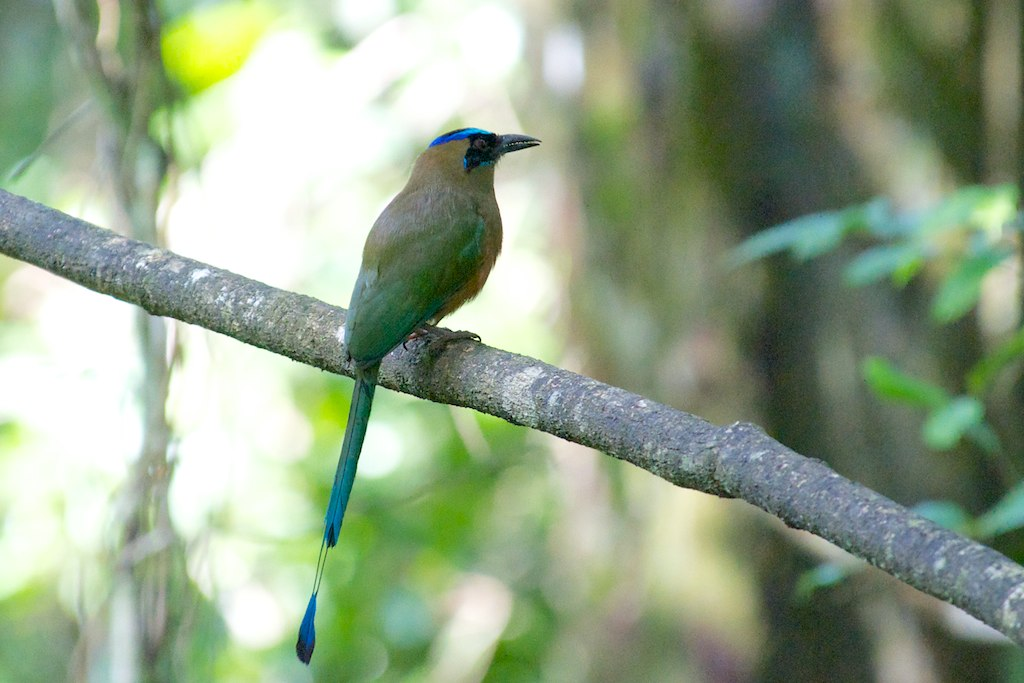

Conservation status
- Least Concern (IUCN 3.1)

Scientific classification
- Kingdom: Animalia
- Phylum: Chordata
- Class: Aves
- Order: Coraciiformes
- Family: Momotidae
- Genus: Momotus
- Species: M. subrufescens

Binomial name
- Momotus subrufescens Sclater, PL, 1853
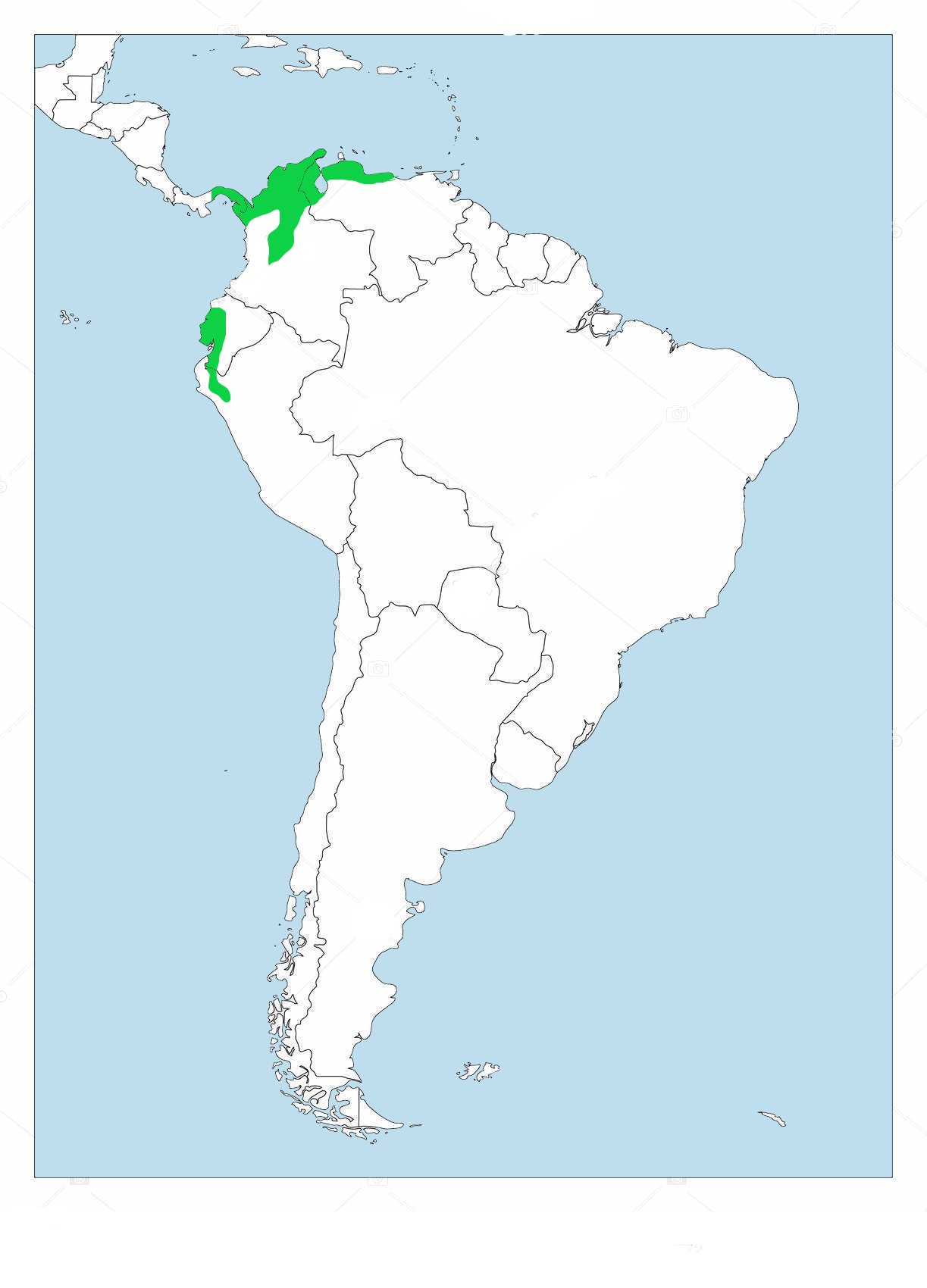

= Whooping motmot =

Species of bird

The whooping motmot (Momotus subrufescens) is a colorful bird in the family Momotidae. It is found in Colombia, Ecuador, Panama, Peru, and Venezuela.

== Taxonomy and systematics ==
The whooping motmot and the blue-capped (Momotus coeruleiceps), Trinidad (M. bahamensis), Amazonian (M. momota), Lesson's (M. lessonii), and Andean motmots (M. aequatorialis) were at one time all considered conspecific. They were split following a 2009 publication which detailed their differences. The whooping motmot has four recognized subspecies, the nominate Momotus subrufescens subrufescens, M. s. spatha, M. s. osgoodi, and M. s. agenticinctus.

== Description ==
The whooping motmot's back and wings are olive-green and the underparts dull brown. It has a long, green to blue, tail that has extended feathers with racquet tips that are blue tipped with black. Its crown is black surrounded by a blue band, and it has a black eyemask bordered with turquoise. Twenty-seven specimens of the nominate whooping motmot weighed 75 to 124 g (2.6 to 4.4 oz).

== Distribution and habitat ==
The whooping motmot has two disjunct populations. The nominate subspecies is found from eastern Panama to northern and western Colombia. M. s. spatha is only on the Guajira Peninsula of northern Colombia. M. s. osgoodi is found from eastern Colombia into northwestern Venezuela. M. s. agenticinctus is separate; it is found in western Ecuador and northwestern Peru. The whooping motmot inhabits several forest types including lowland evergreen and deciduous primary forests, forest edges, and secondary forest.

== Behavior ==
=== Feeding ===
Not much is known about the whooping motmot's diet. It probably mostly eats large arthropods but is also reported to eat berries and lizards.

=== Breeding ===
Like most Coraciiformes, the whooping motmot nests in long tunnels in earth banks.

=== Vocalization ===
The whooping motmot's song has been described as "whoooop" and a shorter "whoop" .

== Status ==
The IUCN has assessed the whooping motmot as being of Least Concern.
