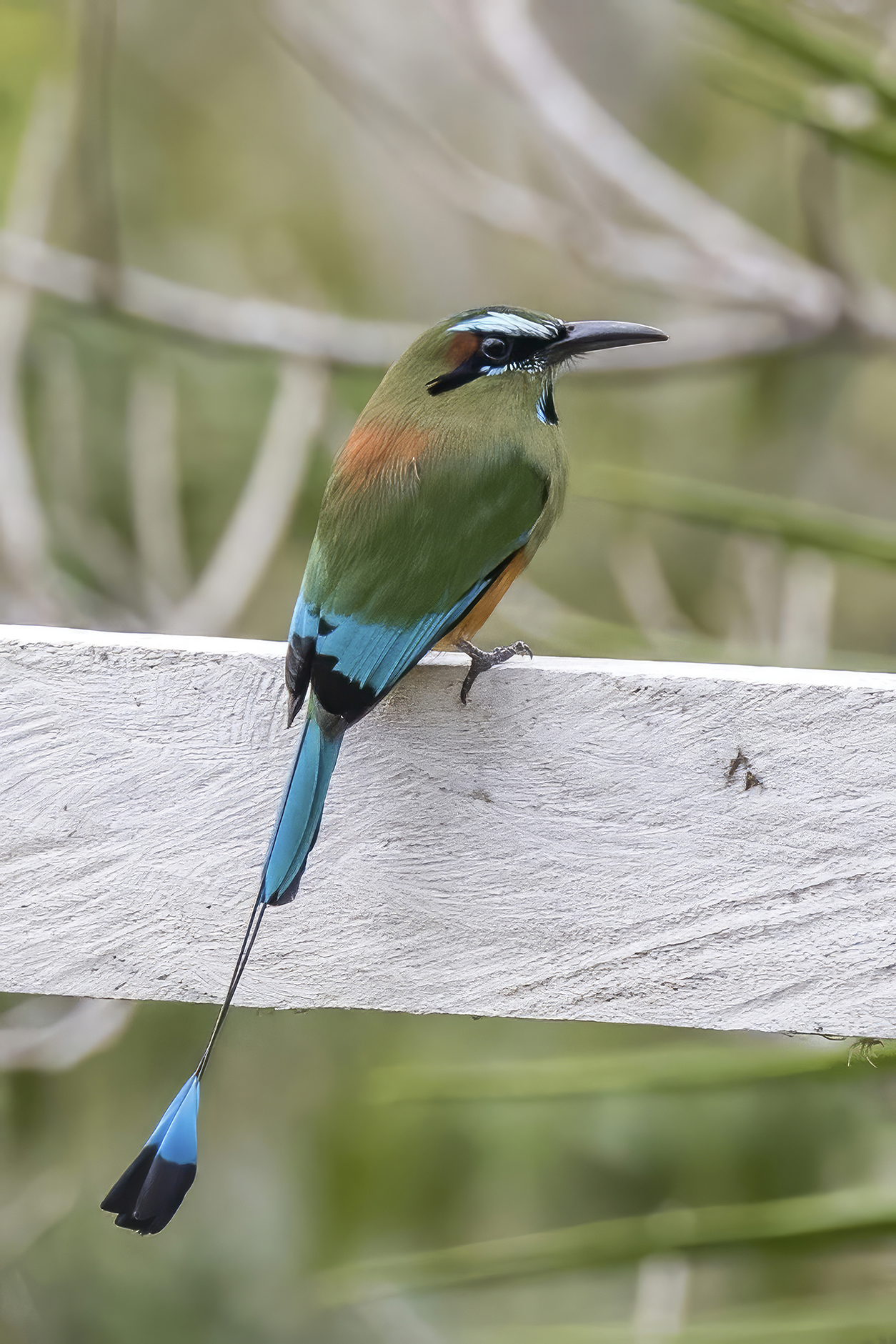
- E. s. apiaster, Honduras

Conservation status
- Least Concern (IUCN 3.1)

Scientific classification
- Kingdom: Animalia
- Phylum: Chordata
- Class: Aves
- Order: Coraciiformes
- Family: Momotidae
- Genus: Eumomota; P.L. Sclater, 1858
- Species: E. superciliosa

Binomial name
- Eumomota superciliosa (Sandbach, 1837)
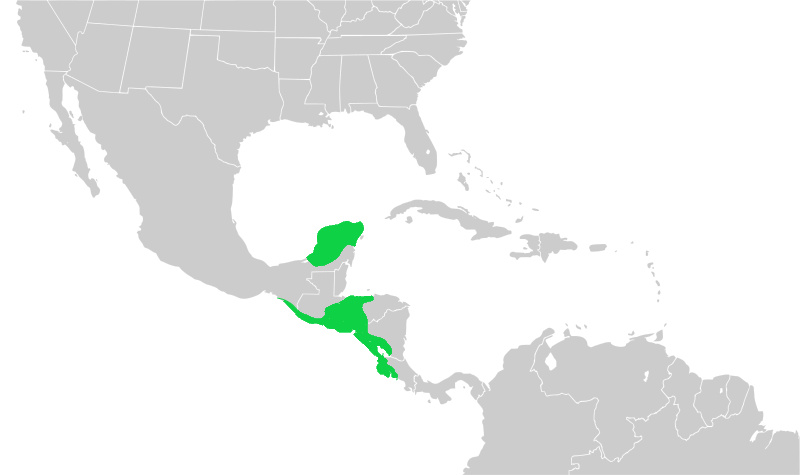

= Turquoise-browed motmot =

Mesoamerican species of bird

The turquoise-browed motmot (Eumomota superciliosa) is a colourful, medium-sized bird of the motmot family, Momotidae. It is the only species in its genus Eumomota. It inhabits Central America from south-east Mexico (mostly the Yucatán Peninsula), to Costa Rica, where it is common and not considered threatened. It lives in fairly open habitats such as forest edge, gallery forest and scrubland. It has a preference for higher tree diversity and richness, alongside a low open canopy and dense understory. It also appears to prefer dry forest. This is in contrast to the other motmot known to inhabit the Yucatán, Lesson’s motmot, which prefers moist forest. As a result, their respective distributions allow ecologists to map the process of aridification induced by anthropogenic climate change. Some literature thus considers the turquoise-browed motmot to be a bioindicator.

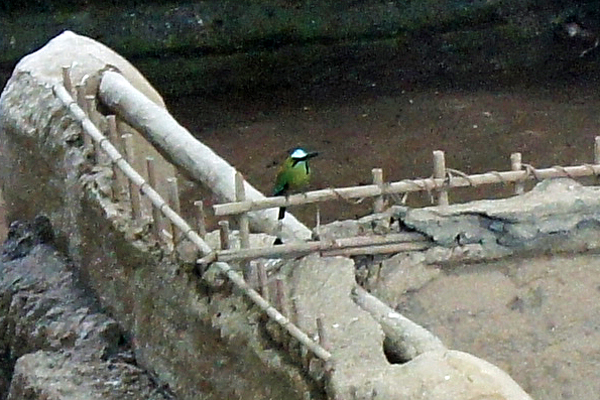
A torogoz in Joya de Cerén Mayan ruins in El Salvador

The bird is 34 cm (13 in) long and weighs 65 g (2.3 oz). It has a mostly grey-blue body with a rufous back and belly. There is a bright blue strip above the eye and a blue-bordered black patch on the throat. The flight feathers and upperside of the tail are blue. The tips of the tail feathers are shaped like rackets and the bare feather shafts, also classified as wires, are longer than in other motmots. Although it is often said that motmots pluck the barbs off their tail to create the racketed shape, this is not true; the barbs are weakly attached and fall off due to abrasion with substrates and with routine preening.

To reproduce, they lay white eggs (3–6) in a long tunnel nest in an earth bank, or sometimes in a quarry or fresh-water well. However, if this is not available, they will transition to nesting in inaccessible limestone crevices in cenotes or caves. It excavates nesting sites in March to avoid the hotter temperatures. Females lay in 48 hour intervals with a lay time of 24-56 days and hatch time from 16-20 days depending on the bird's location. A shorter lay and hatch time is observed in more populated areas.

== Behavior ==
The species frequently utilizes exposed substrates such as overhead utility lines and fence posts as foraging perches. It predominantly employs a sit-and-wait hunting strategy to scan for potential prey, which primarily consists of insects alongside small reptiles. Captured prey items are consumed using the bird's flattened, broad and serrated bill.

Unlike most bird species, in which sexually dimorphic traits are restricted to males, the turquoise-browed motmot displays the elaborate racket-tipped tail equally across both sexes. Research indicates that the monomorphic trait has evolved to serve different purposes for each sex. In males, the tail acts as a visual signal to attract mates, with longer tails leading to higher pairing and reproductive success. There is no significant difference in pairing success, reproductive output or fledging rates in females relative to tail length. In addition to this function, the tail is used by both sexes in a wag-display, whereby the tail is moved back-and-forth in a pendulous manner, often accompanied by clucking vocalizations. The wag-display, performed in a context unrelated to mating, is exhibited by both sexes in the presence of a predator. This behavioral response functions as a pursuit-deterrent signal, communicating awareness to the predator and signaling that hunting attempts are unlikely to succeed. The motmot can also be observed exhibiting its tail-wagging behavior for a brief period during the breeding season, prior to feeding its young. These are the sole documented instances of the behavior being displayed sans vocalizations or the presence of predators. Its call is nasal, croaking and far-reaching.

== Cultural relevance ==
The turquoise-browed motmot exhibits significant cultural prominence throughout its geographical distribution. The species has acquired numerous vernacular designations including guardabarranco ("ravine-guard") in Nicaragua, torogoz in El Salvador (reflecting its vocalization) and pájaro reloj or pajaro toh ("clock bird") in the Mayan dialects of the Yucatán Peninsula, a reference to its pendulum-like tail movement. In Costa Rica, the species is called momoto cejiceleste or the pájaro bobo ("foolish bird"), a name inspired by its habit of allowing humans to approach closely before flying away.

The bird was culturally important to the Maya, it was revered as a guardian of the underworld because of its affinity with nesting along the edges of cenotes, which the Maya believed to be secret portals to that realm. Mayan legends also tell the origin story of the bird’s tail; they believed that the motmot was once a conceited bird who refused to help other forest inhabitants find food or shelter during a storm. Instead, he went to sleep in a cenote until the ill weather passed. When the sky was clear, he flew out to reunite with the other birds, only to be laughed at. Unbeknownst to him, he had slept in a crevice with his tail hanging out, such that it became ravaged by the storm. Ashamed by what was left of his tail – a meager two feathers – he flew back into the forest, never to be seen again.

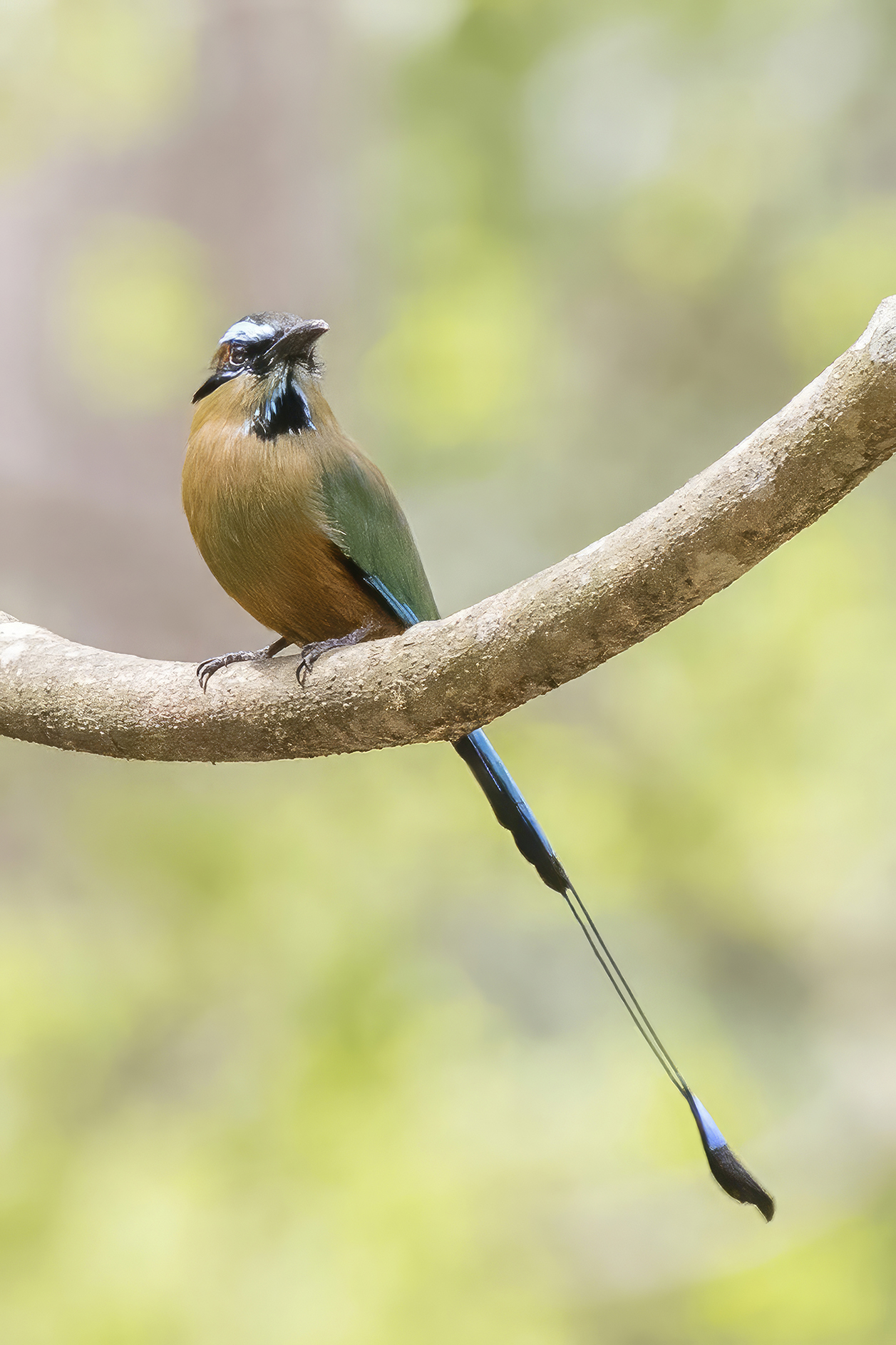

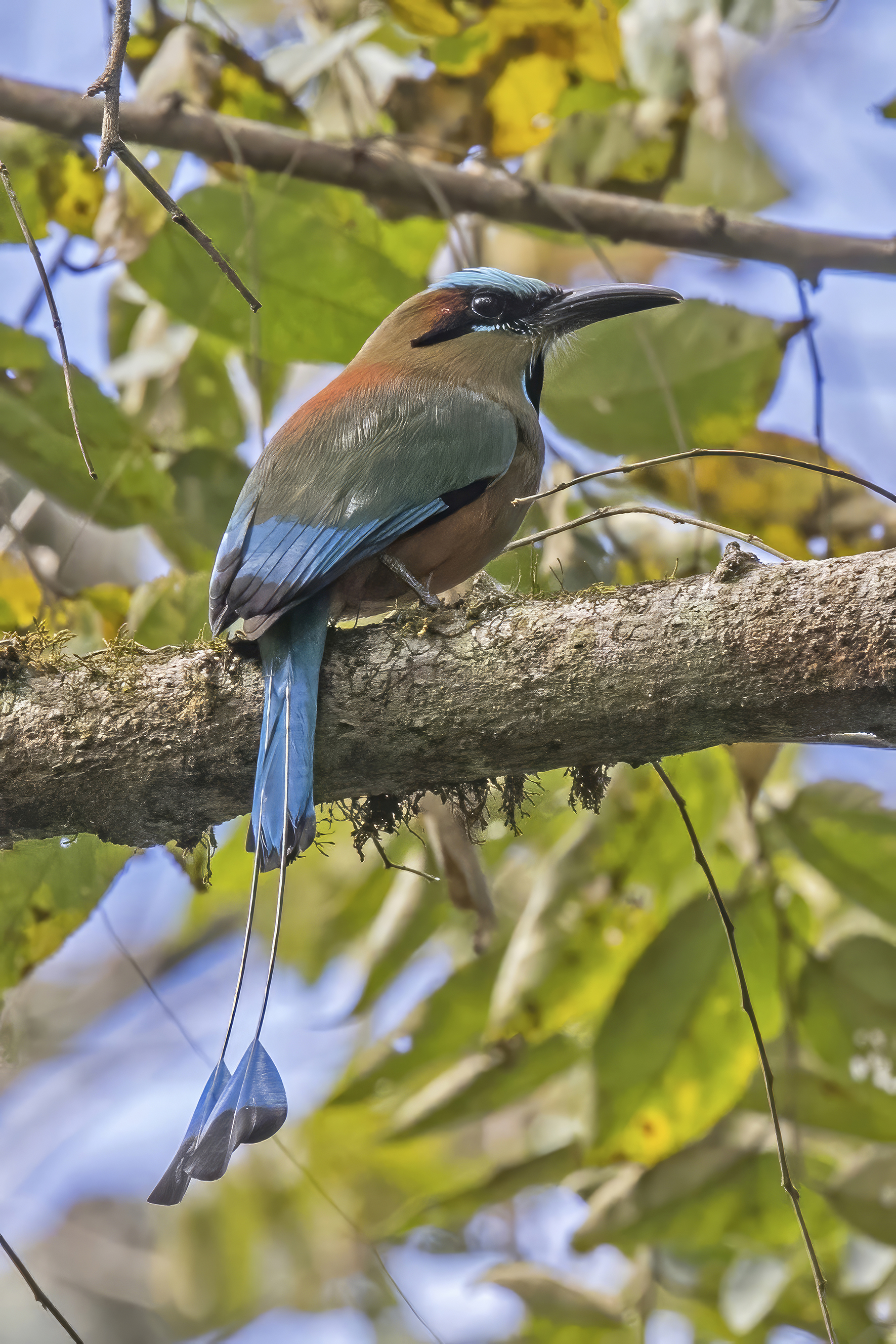

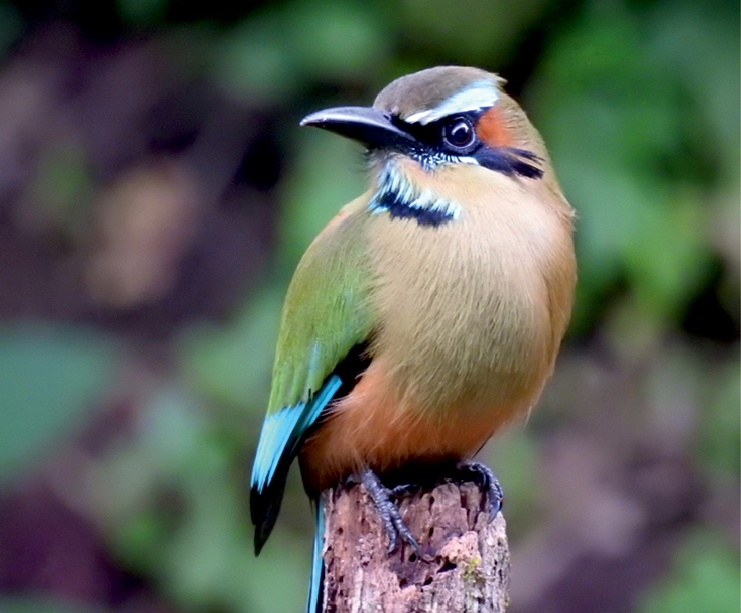

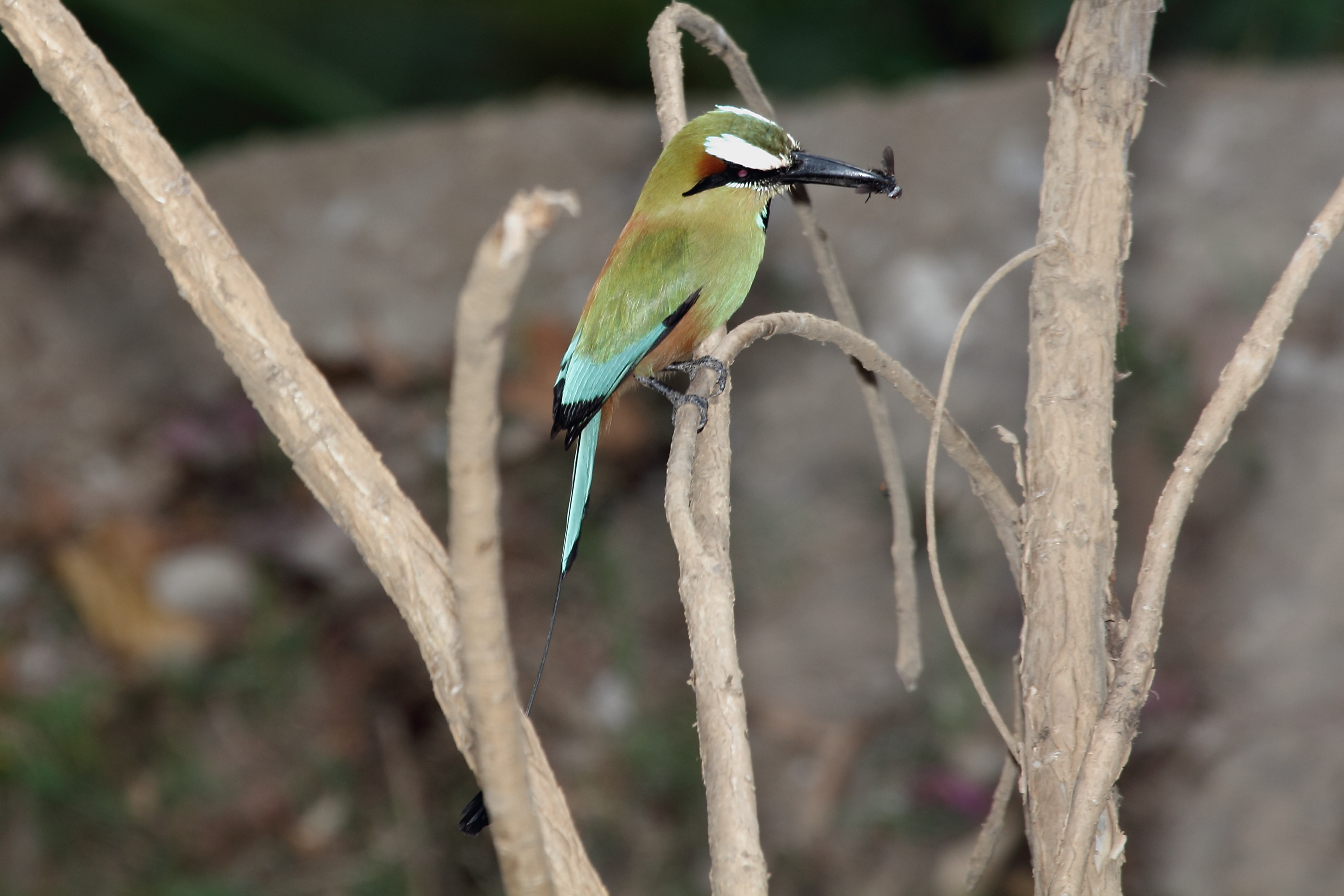
