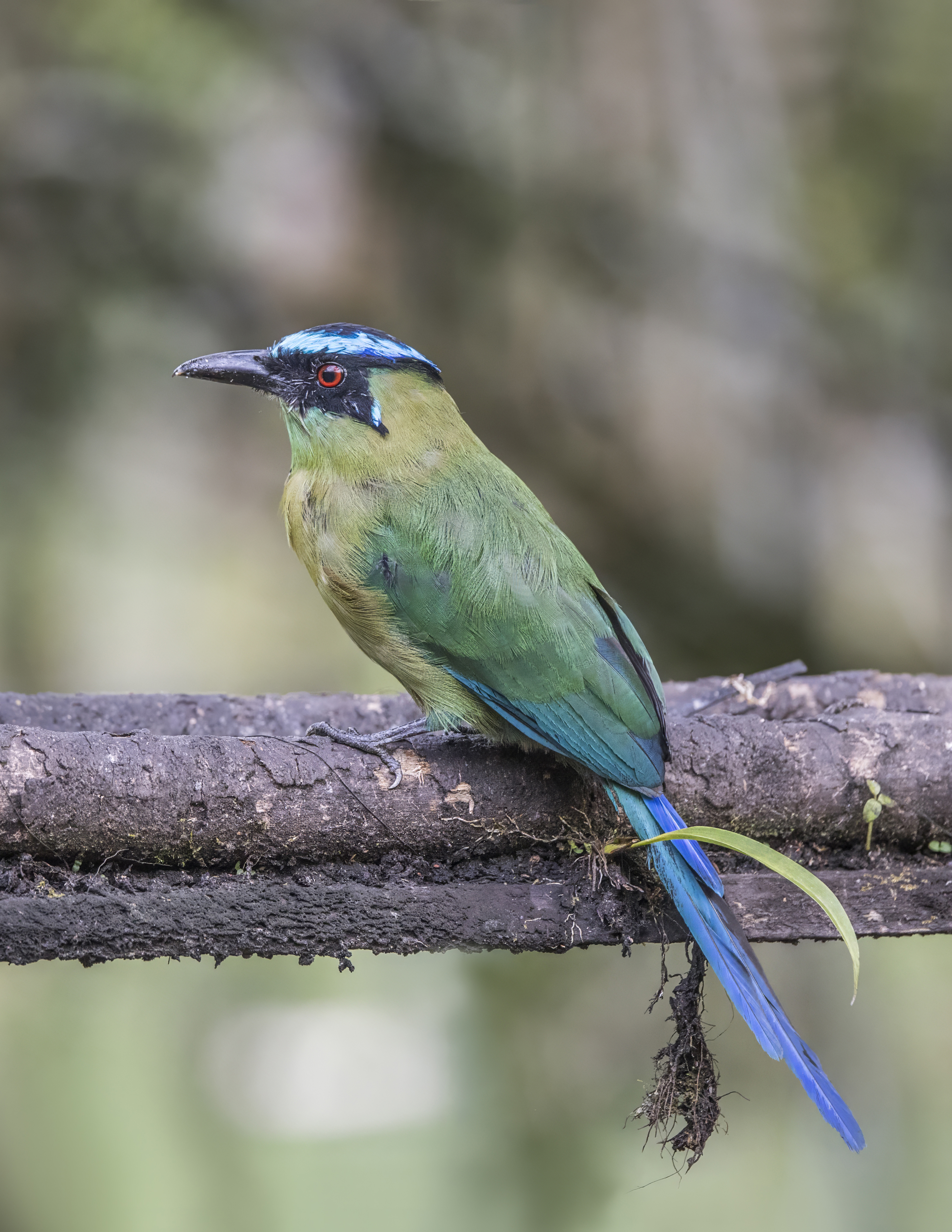

Conservation status
- Least Concern (IUCN 3.1)

Scientific classification
- Kingdom: Animalia
- Phylum: Chordata
- Class: Aves
- Order: Coraciiformes
- Family: Momotidae
- Genus: Momotus
- Species: M. aequatorialis

Binomial name
- Momotus aequatorialis Gould, 1858
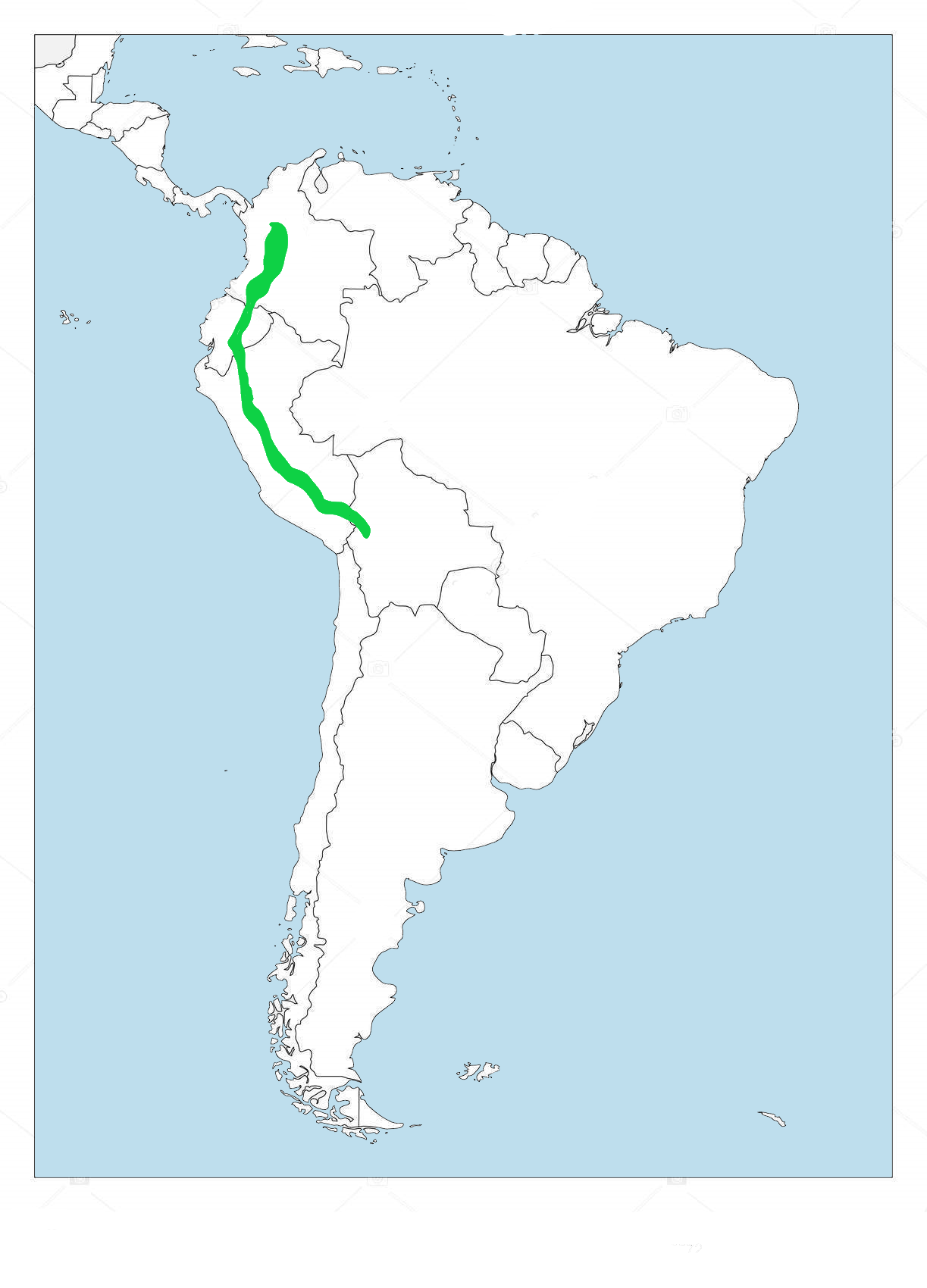

= Andean motmot =

Species of bird

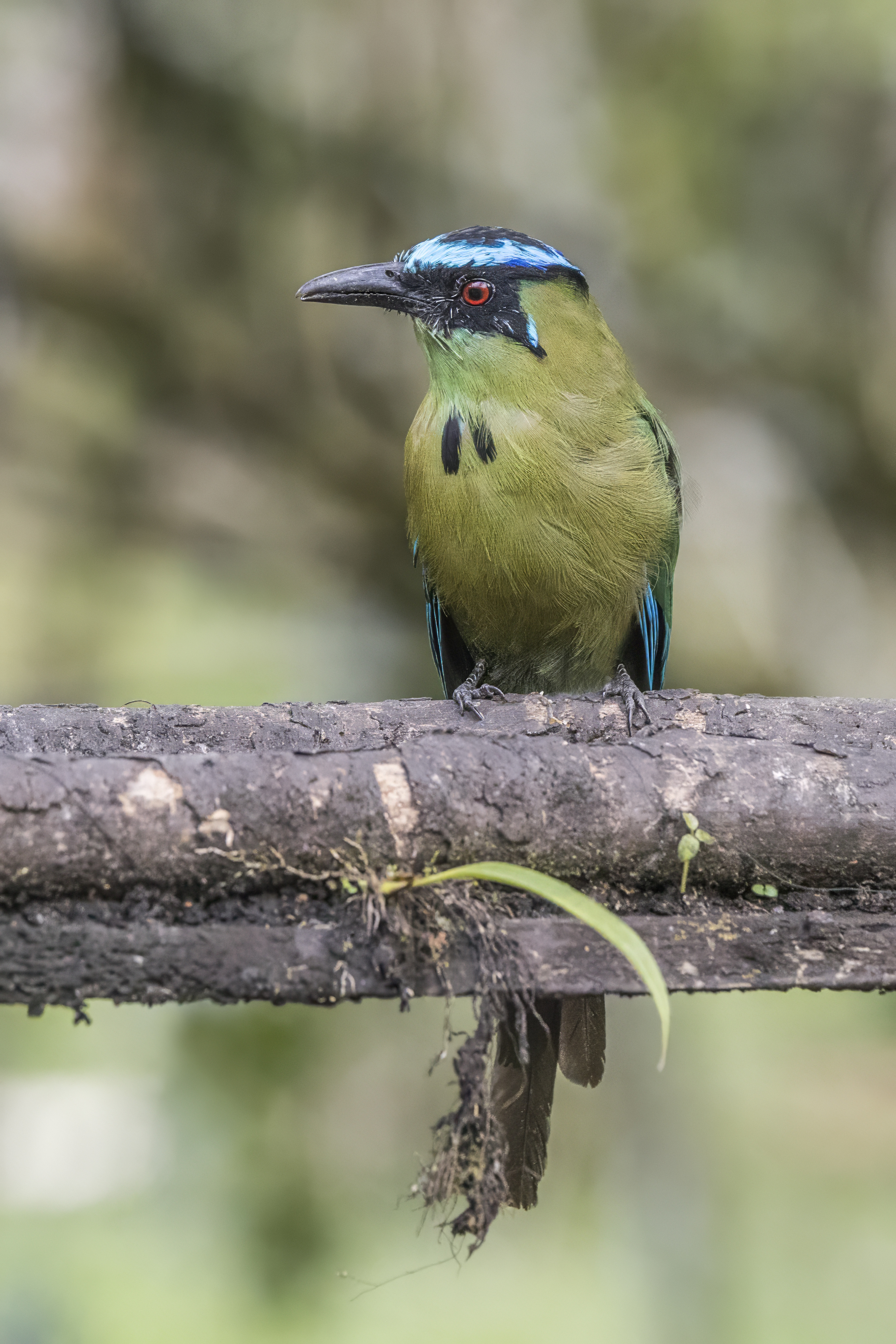

The Andean motmot or highland motmot (Momotus aequatorialis) is a colorful bird found from northern Colombia to western Bolivia.

== Taxonomy and systematics ==
The Andean motmot and the blue-capped (Momotus coeruleiceps), whooping (M. subrufrescens), Trinidad (M. bahamensis), Lesson's (M. lessonii), and Amazonian motmots (M. momota) were all at one time considered conspecific. The Andean motmot has two recognized subspecies, the nominate Momotus aequatorialis aequatorialis and M. a. chlorolaemus.

== Appearance ==
The Andean motmot is in general typical of its family: It is a large bird with a stout black bill and a long tail with a "racquet" tip. It is 46 to 48 cm (18 to 19 in) long and weighs 143 to 202 g (5.0 to 7.1 oz). Its back, wings, throat, breast, and belly are green. The crown is black, bordered on the sides and rear with a "diadem" of various shades of blue. It has a black "mask" bordered with blue and a black spot or streak in the center of the breast. The racquets are dark blue.

== Distribution and habitat ==
The Andean motmot is resident in the Andes from Colombia through Ecuador and Peru to La Paz Department in northwestern Bolivia. In Colombia, it occurs in all three major cordilleras, but in Ecuador, Peru, and Bolivia it is found only along the eastern side of the Andes. In Colombia it ranges in elevation from 1,500 to 3,100 m (4,900 to 10,200 ft), in Ecuador from 1,000 to 2,100 m (3,300 to 6,900 ft), in Peru from 1,000 to 2,400 m (3,300 to 7,900 ft), and in Bolivia from 1,600 to 1,900 m (5,200 to 6,200 ft).

The Andean motmot primarily inhabits humid montane forest, often near steams. It can also be found along forest edges and in secondary forest.

== Behavior ==
=== Feeding ===
The Andean motmot is omnivorous. It primarily feeds on arthropods but also eats fruit. It has been documented taking a small marsupial of genus Micoureus.

=== Breeding ===
The Andean motmot is assumed to nest in a long burrow in an earth bank like other motmots, but the nest has not been described. A male in breeding condition was collected in September in Colombia.

=== Vocalization ===
The song of the Andean motmot has been described as "a monotone boop-oop" , similar to that of rufous motmot.

== Status ==
The IUCN has assessed the Andean motmot as being of Least Concern.

== Additional reading ==
- Hilty, S. L. & W. L. Brown (1986). A guide to the birds of Colombia. Princeton. New Jersey: Princeton University Press.
- Ridgely, Robert S.; Greenfield, Paul J. (2001). The Birds of Ecuador: Status, Distribution, and Taxonomy. Ithaca, New York: Cornell University Press.
