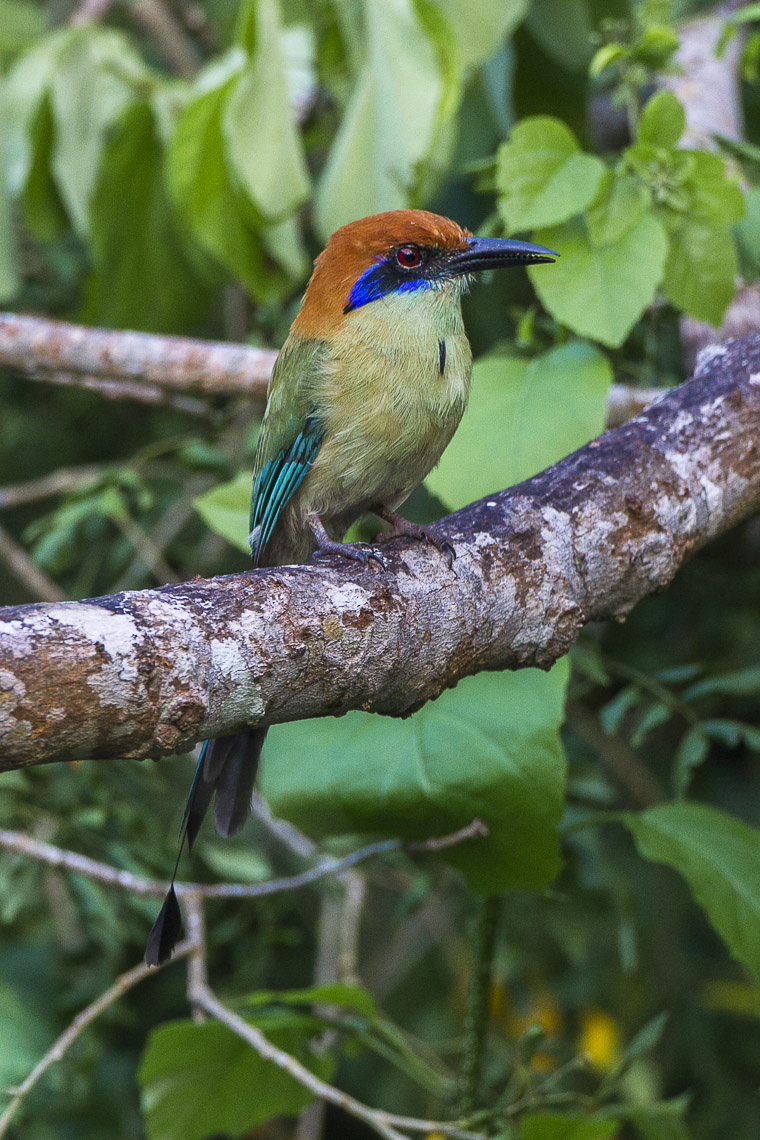

Conservation status
- Least Concern (IUCN 3.1)

Scientific classification
- Kingdom: Animalia
- Phylum: Chordata
- Class: Aves
- Order: Coraciiformes
- Family: Momotidae
- Genus: Momotus
- Species: M. mexicanus

Binomial name
- Momotus mexicanus Swainson, 1827
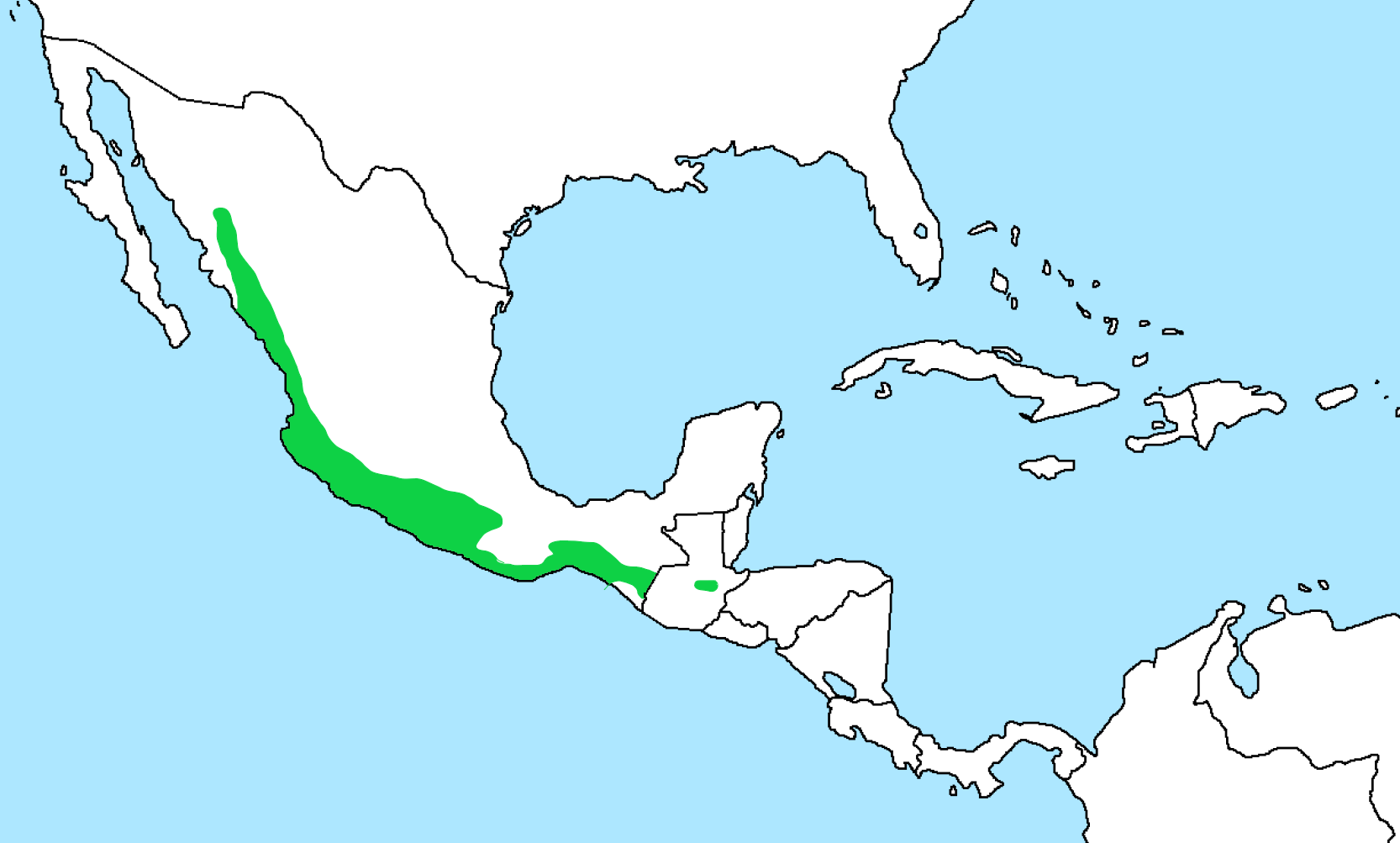
- Range

= Mexican motmot =

Species of bird

The Mexican motmot or russet-crowned motmot (Momotus mexicanus) is a species of motmot native to north-western Mexico and central Guatemala. It is a year-round resident of the tropical and subtropical dry broadleaf forests and scrubland. The Mexican motmot is the most understudied species of motmot in the family Momotidae.

Russet refers to the reddish-brown colour of the bird's head and originates from the Latin russus meaning red.

== Taxonomy ==
Motmots are a part of the order Coraciiformes which also includes bee-eaters, rollers, todies, and kingfishers. The Mexican motmot is one of seven species in the genus Momotus of the family Momotidae.

Mexican motmots are very sedentary because of their strong site fidelity; 60% return to the same nesting areas as the previous year because of the low amount of suitable nesting sites. As a result, gene flow between different populations is limited which can lead to speciation. Reyes et al. found that genetic variation between three populations in Mexico was very high (12.9%) considering that the populations were relatively close.

There are four recognized subspecies of Mexican motmot:

- M. m. mexicanus
- M. m. vanrossemi
- M. m. saturates
- M. m. castaneiceps

In 2026 the American Ornithological Society split M. m. castaneiceps from the rest of the species, naming it the Guatemalan motmot (M. castaneiceps) based on differences in plumage, vocalizations, and genetics.

== Description ==
=== Morphology ===
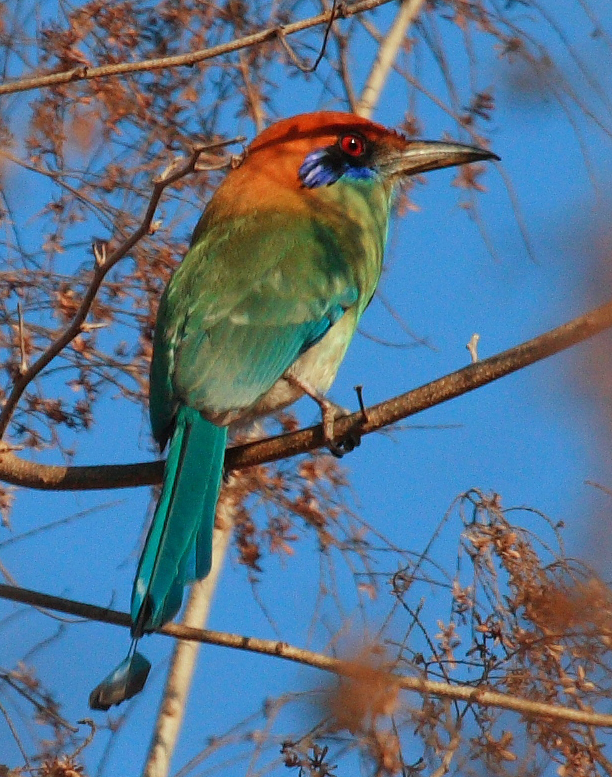
The back of a perched Mexican motmot

Mexican motmots are relatively small motmots that measure 30.5 to 35.5 cm long and weigh 74 to 104 g. Like most motmots, Mexican motmots are not sexually dimorphic in plumage. However, females have shorter tail feathers (10 to 15 cm) than males (11 to 22 cm). Mexican motmots have a rufous crown and nape. They have a green back and green wings with blue-green primary feathers. Their chest is pale green with a black spot, and they have an even paler underbelly. Mexican motmots have a long blue tail with a bare section near the tip of the longest central feathers, which creates a dark racket-shaped tip. Their black bills have a slightly serrated edge and curve downwards. Like most motmots, Mexican motmots have a black eye-mask which is lined by blue & violet feathers. They have reddish eyes and grey legs and feet. Juveniles have brown eyes and duller plumage. The four subspecies vary in morphology; in comparison to M. m. mexicanus, M. m. vanrossemi is paler, M. m. saturates is larger and darker, and M. m. castaneiceps has a darker chestnut crown and its black eye-mask is more extensive.

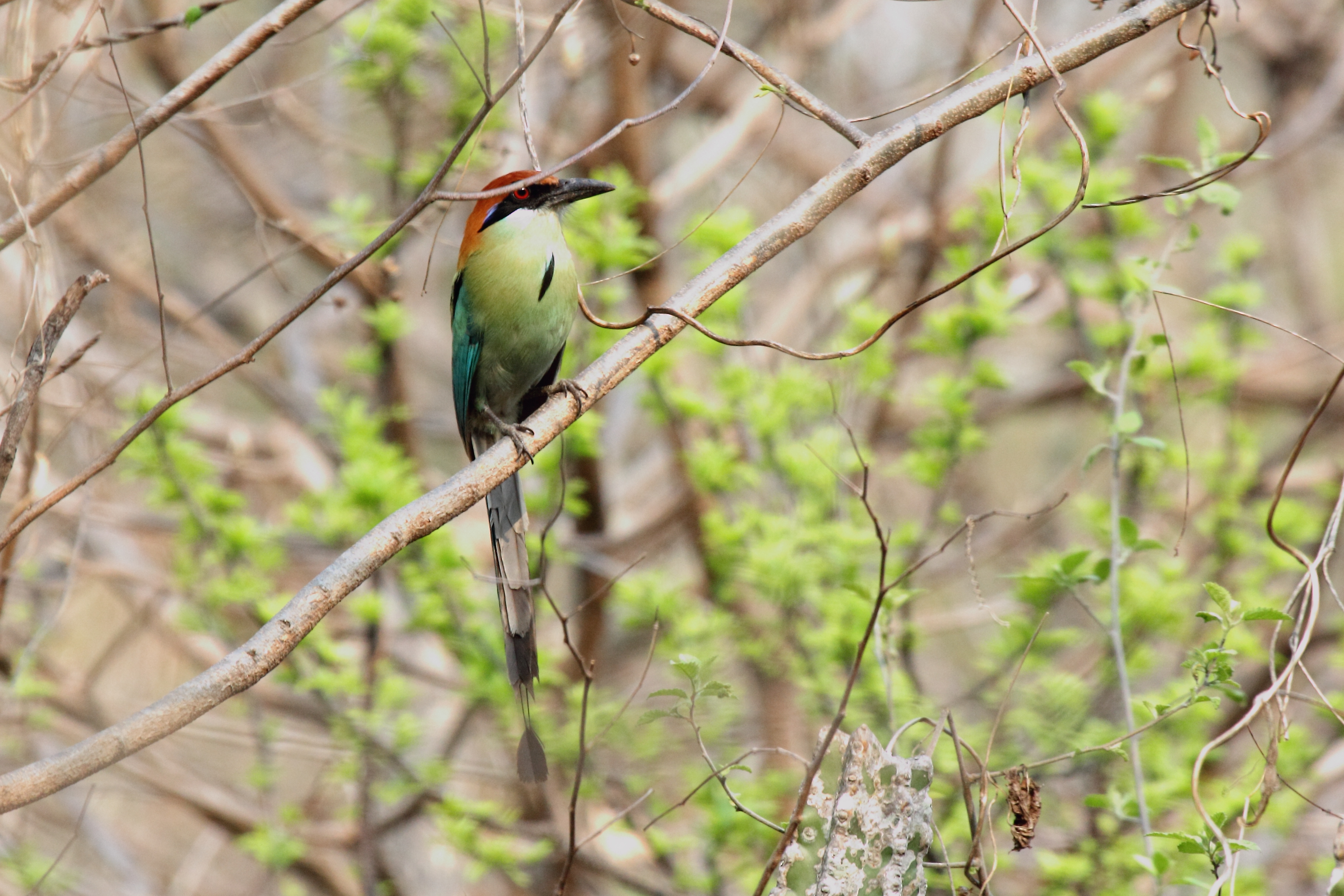
The front of a perched Mexican motmot

=== Vocalization ===
The Mexican motmot produces a low "krrp", "krrup", or "kru, krr-up" which is strung together, making a longer call. They can also produce a hollow "ook". Mated pairs take part in call-and-response duets.

== Distribution and habitat ==
Mexican motmots prefer old-growth forests with closed canopy but they are also found in secondary forests with a lot of canopy coverage. They live in dry and humid tropical forests and clearings up to 1800m in altitude.

Mexican motmots are found along the western coast of Mexico and in an isolated population in central Guatemala. They are common along their range. The subspecies M. m. vanrossemi can be observed in north-western Mexico in Sonora, Sinaloas and Chihuahua. M. m. mexicanus can be found from Sinaloa to Oaxaca along the west coast and M. m. saturates can be found in south-western Mexico and Guatemala. M. m. castaneiceps is an isolated population only found in the Motagua Valley of central Guatemala until recently. In 2018, the distribution of M. m. castaneiceps expanded to the Nentón valley in Huehuetenango which suggests that their range might be growing to western Guatemala.

== Behaviour and ecology ==
=== Diet and foraging ===
Mexican motmots feeds on large invertebrates (i.e. grasshoppers, etc.), fruits, and small vertebrates (i.e. snakes, lizards, etc.). They have the typical feeding strategy of the Momotidae family known as "flycatching"; Mexican motmots perch on low branches and dart out to catch prey or bite fruit. They return to their perches to eat their catch and they hit their live prey against branches before swallowing it.

=== Reproduction ===
Mexican motmots are socially monogamous birds. Females and males pair up during the breeding season and they both care for the brood. Labour is equally divided between the mating pair.

Breeding season is between May and July, which is the wet season. Mexican motmots tend to breed once per year. They lay one small clutch of 4–5 eggs per breeding season, which is typical for tropical birds. The incubation period is between 15 and 20 days. Both males and females feed the hatchlings and fledglings leave the nest after a total of 30 to 42 days. Mexican motmots have a 68% hatching success rate and a 56% fledgling success rate. 83% of hatchlings will successfully fly out of the nest. Most of the deaths happen during incubation and the predation of the brood is primarily by snake and iguanas.

Mexican motmots are burrow-nesting birds. Each mating pair digs a tunnel that is 88 to 170 cm deep in an earthen, roadside, or river bank. The tunnels are horizontally flat, they can curve and they have an egg chamber. The tunnels are only for breeding but the breeding sites are multi-purpose territories that the Mexican motmots use for foraging, roosting, etc. These tunnels are very dependent on the quality of the substrate because they can get flooded or collapse if they are not built in a suitable area. Good nesting sites are hard to find and they are limited by soil type. Loam-textured soils which contain sand, silt and clay are the best substrates for Mexican motmots to nest in because they have better drainage, they are easier to excavate, and they offer better ventilation. Since suitable nesting sites are scarce, Mexican motmots are strongly sedentary and will return to previous nesting grounds because they already know the quality, food sources, shelters, predators, and breeding performances of that site.

=== Lifespan ===
Charre et al. suggest that the lifespan of a Mexican motmott is at least 11 years. This estimate is not definitive because it is based on the recapturing of one individual 10 years later.

=== Territoriality ===
Territory is very valuable to Mexican motmots because of the lack of suitable nesting areas. As a result, Mexican motmots they are very territorial. However, Richard E. Tashian reported seeing Mexican motmots in flocks of birds including golden-fronted woodpeckers, white-throated Magpie-jay, coloured thrush, streak-backed oriole and coppery-tailed trogon in Guatemala. This suggests that Mexican motmots defend their territories only against individuals of their species which is called infraspecific territoriality. When there is an intruder, the Mexican motmot holds a leaf in its beak to display combative behaviour before chasing or fighting the intruder. This territorial behaviour is performed year-round during the breeding and non-breeding season. Both paired and unpaired males and females defend their territory. Mating pairs will react differently towards male intruders and female intruders. They are more aggressive towards a male intruder than a female intruder. When a male intruder holds a leaf, the mating pair get closer to chase or fight him. But when a female intruder holds a leaf, the mating pair holds a leaf as well to warn her.

=== Predator-response ===
Mexican motmots wave their tails side-to-side when they see a predator as an acknowledgment of their presence.

== Conservation status ==
Although the IUCN recognizes Mexican motmots of least concern for conservation, their habitats are threatened. The suitable nesting sites for Mexican motmots are steadily decreasing because of changing climate and human activity. Nest sites are becoming limited because of the higher amount of precipitation associated with climate change which increases the flooding and the collapse of nests. Agricultural use in the Motagua Valley, Guatemala diminishes the available nesting ground of the subspecies M. m. castaneiceps. In addition, fragmented forests increases brood parasitism and predation. The Mexican motmot is at risk of becoming endangered if their habitats are not conserved.
