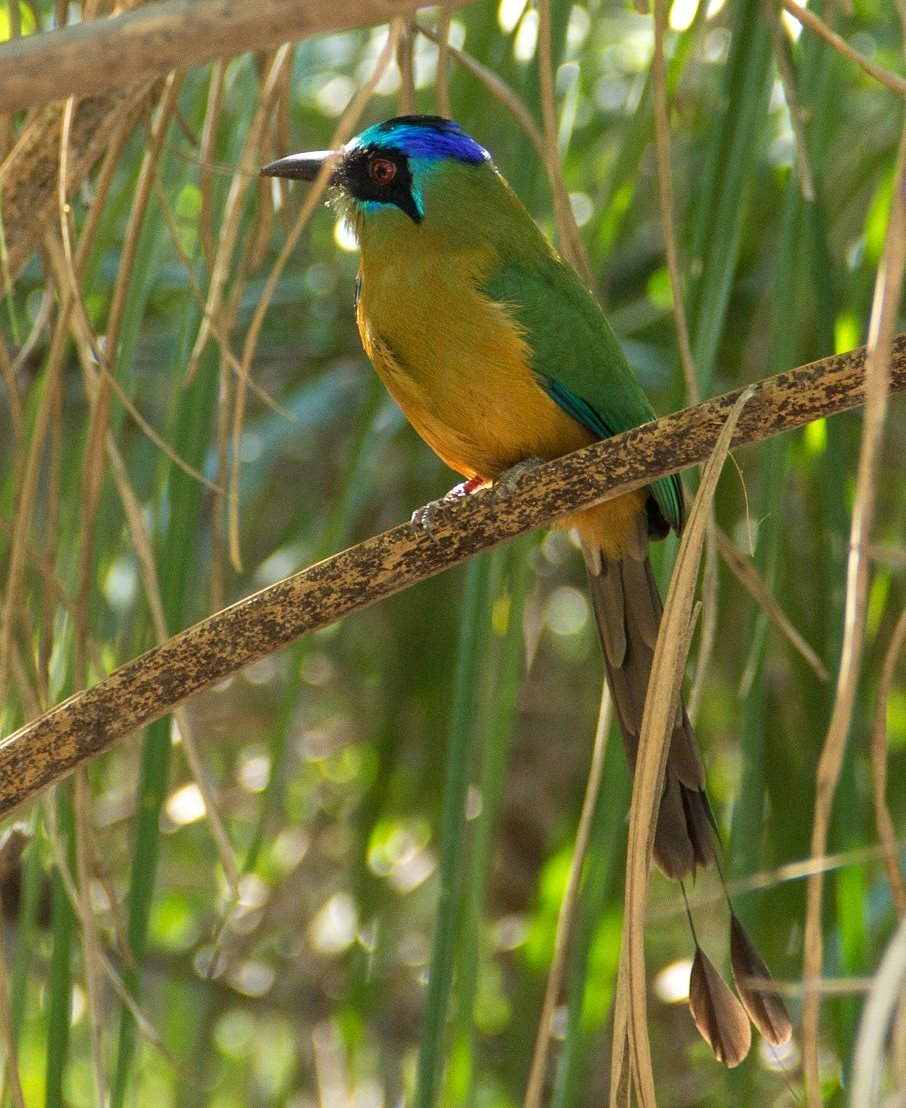

Conservation status
- Least Concern (IUCN 3.1)

Scientific classification
- Kingdom: Animalia
- Phylum: Chordata
- Class: Aves
- Order: Coraciiformes
- Family: Momotidae
- Genus: Momotus
- Species: M. momota

Binomial name
- Momotus momota (Linnaeus, 1766)
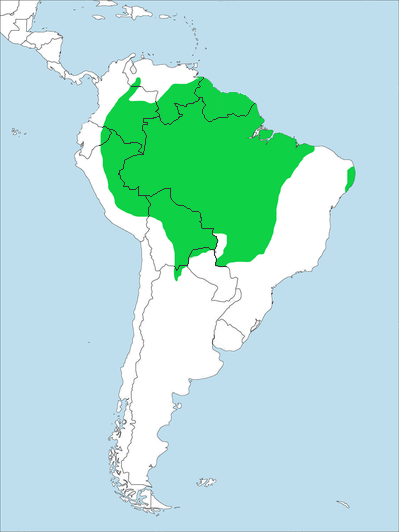
- Range

Synonyms
- Ramphastos momota Linnaeus, 1766

= Amazonian motmot =

Species of bird

The Amazonian motmot (Momotus momota) is a colorful coraciiform bird in the family Momotidae. It is found in the Amazon lowlands and low Andean foothills from eastern Venezuela to eastern Brazil and northeastern Argentina.

== Taxonomy and systematics ==
The Amazonian motmot and the blue-capped (Momotus coeruleiceps), whooping (M. subrufrescens), Trinidad (M. bahamensis), Lesson's (M. lessonii), and Andean motmots (M. aequatorialis) were all at one time considered conspecific. The Amazonian motmot has nine recognized subspecies; they are listed in the "Distribution and habitat" section below.

== Description ==
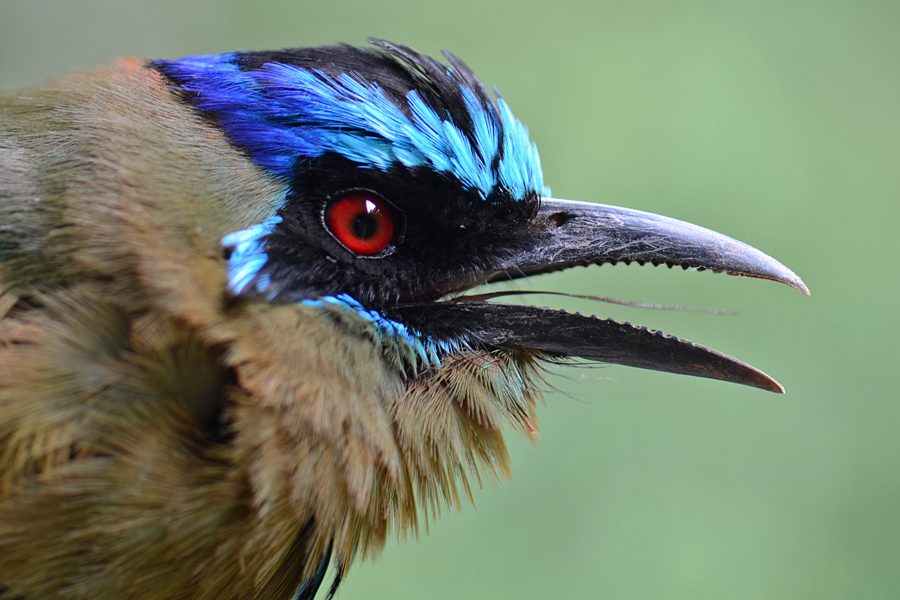
Close-up view of the head

The Amazonian motmot's plumage varies among the subspecies. The bodies of all are shades of green. All have a long tail that has extended feathers with racquet tips that are green or black. Most have a black eyemask, though their size and shape differ. The central crown is black and surrounded or partially bordered by a blue band. The nominate subspecies has a chestnut nape. Momotus momota ignobilis and M. m. cametensis have more extensive chestnut on the neck and face.

== Distribution and habitat ==
The Amazonian motmot is widely distributed in South America east of the Andes. Nine subspecies are recognized:

- Momotus momota momota — eastern Venezuela, Guyana, Suriname, French Guiana, and northern Brazil
- M. m. microstephanus — southeastern Colombia, eastern Ecuador, and northwestern Brazil
- M. m. ignobilis — eastern Peru and western Brazil
- M. m. nattereri — northeastern Bolivia
- M. m. simplex — western to west central Brazil south of the Amazon
- M. m. cametensis — north central Brazil
- M. m. parensis — northeastern Brazil
- M. m. marcgravianus — eastern Brazil
- M. m. pilcomajensis — southern Bolivia, southern Brazil, and northwestern Argentina

Throughout its range the Amazonian motmot inhabits the interior and edges of humid lowland forest. It is found up to 1,200 m (3,900 ft) in Venezuela, to 1,000 m (3,300 ft) in Ecuador, and to 750 m (2,460 ft) in Peru.

== Behavior ==
=== Feeding ===
The Amazonian motmot is omnivorous. It has been documented eating insects and other arthropods, small mammals and reptiles, and fruit.

=== Breeding ===
Like most Coraciiformes, the Amazonian motmot nests in long tunnels in earth banks. Very little else is known about its breeding phenology.

=== Vocalization ===
The Amazonian motmot's song has been described as "a fast, hollow hoo-do" and "a bubbling whOOP-oo". It also makes "a gruff kak", sometimes in a series.
