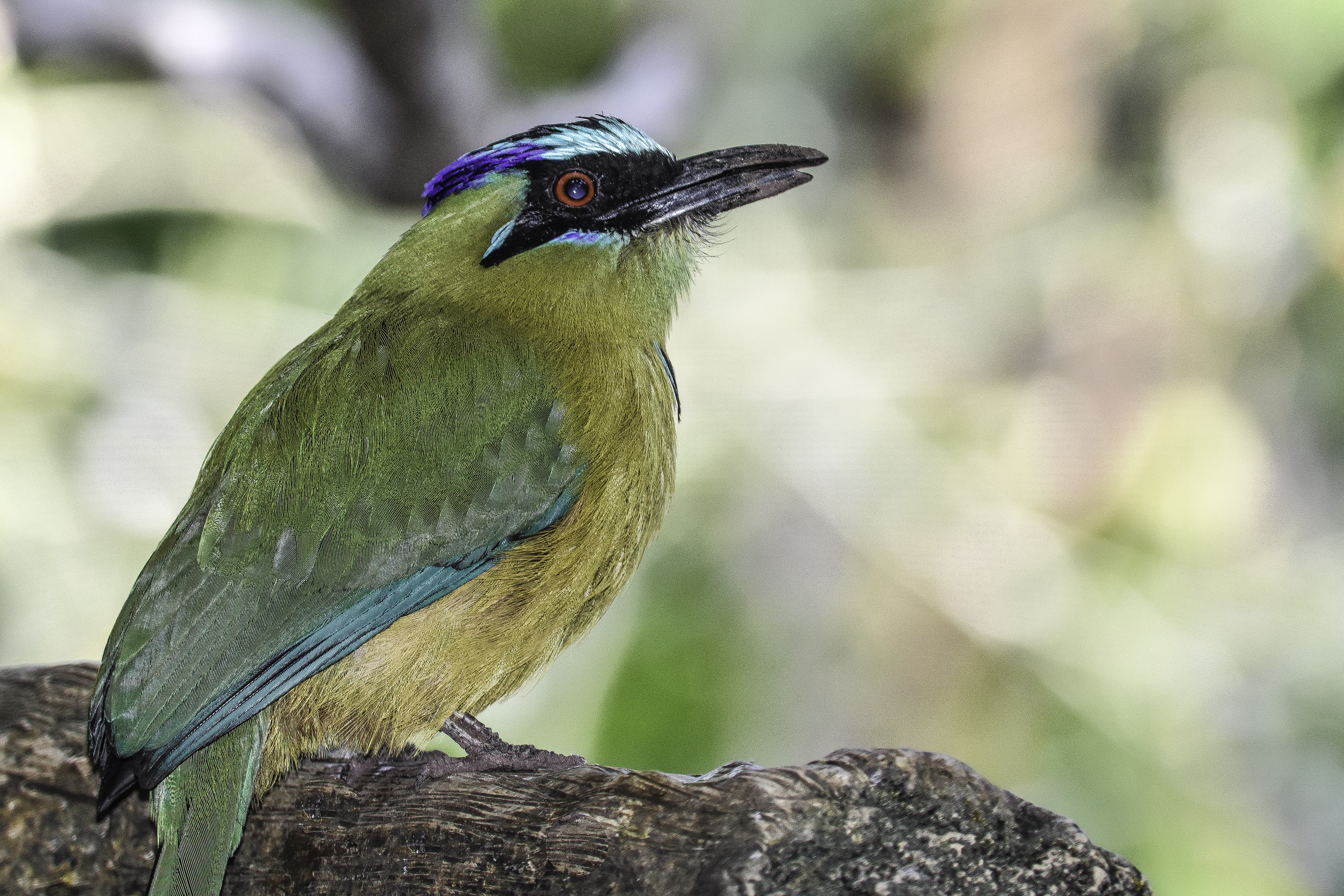

Conservation status
- Least Concern (IUCN 3.1)

Scientific classification
- Kingdom: Animalia
- Phylum: Chordata
- Class: Aves
- Order: Coraciiformes
- Family: Momotidae
- Genus: Momotus
- Species: M. coeruliceps

Binomial name
- Momotus coeruliceps (Gould, 1836)

= Blue-capped motmot =

Species of bird

The blue-capped motmot (Momotus coeruliceps) or blue-crowned motmot is a colorful bird in the family Momotidae that is found in forests and woodlands of eastern Mexico. This species and the Lesson's motmot, Whooping motmot, Trinidad motmot, Amazonian motmot, and Andean motmot were all considered conspecific. The IUCN uses blue-crowned as their identifier for this species; however, it was also the name used for the prior species complex.

It is the only species in the former complex where the central crown is blue. There is a black eyemask. The call is a low owl-like ooo-doot. Blue-crowned motmots have a body length ranging from 38 to 43 cm (15 to 17 in). These birds often sit still, and in their dense forest habitat can be difficult to see, despite their size. They eat small prey such as insects and lizards, and will also regularly take fruit.

Like most of the Coraciiformes, motmots nest in tunnels in banks, laying about three or four white eggs.
