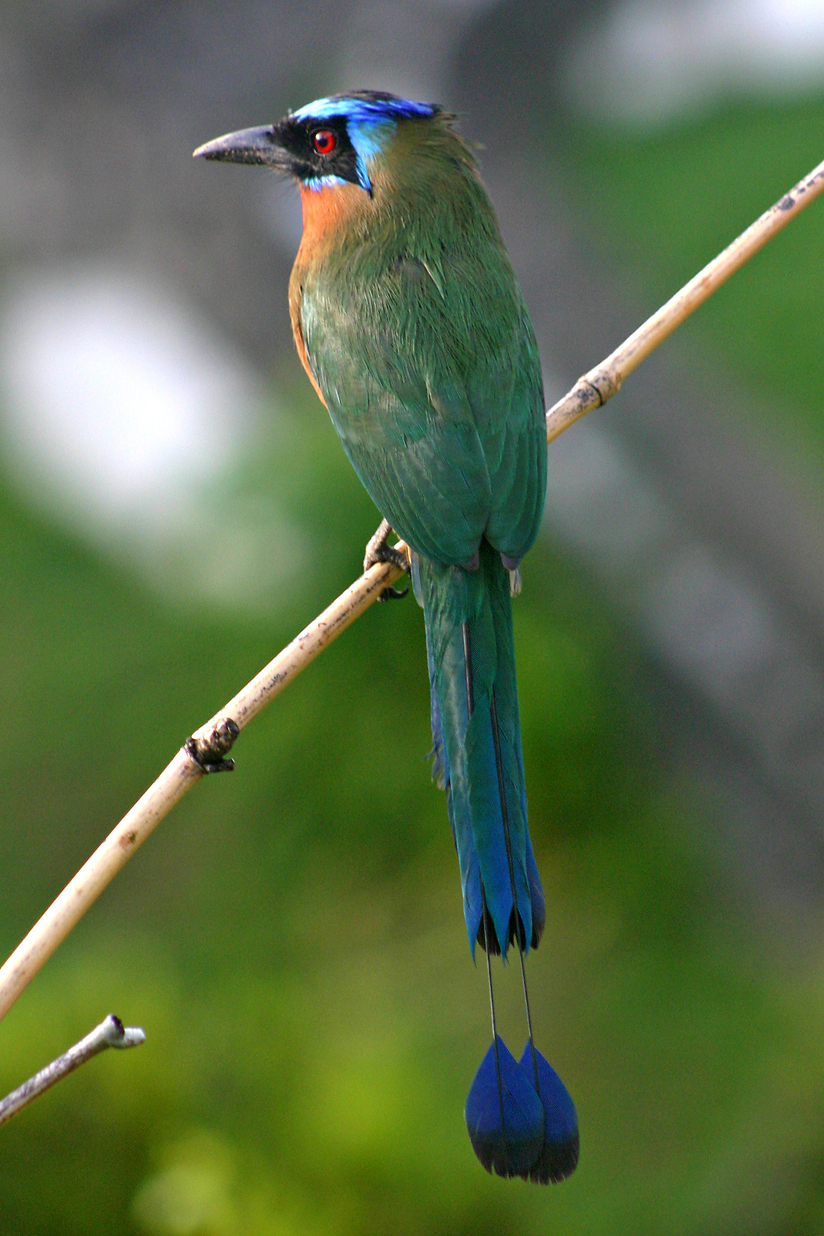

Conservation status
- Least Concern (IUCN 3.1)

Scientific classification
- Kingdom: Animalia
- Phylum: Chordata
- Class: Aves
- Order: Coraciiformes
- Family: Momotidae
- Genus: Momotus
- Species: M. bahamensis

Binomial name
- Momotus bahamensis (Swainson, 1838)
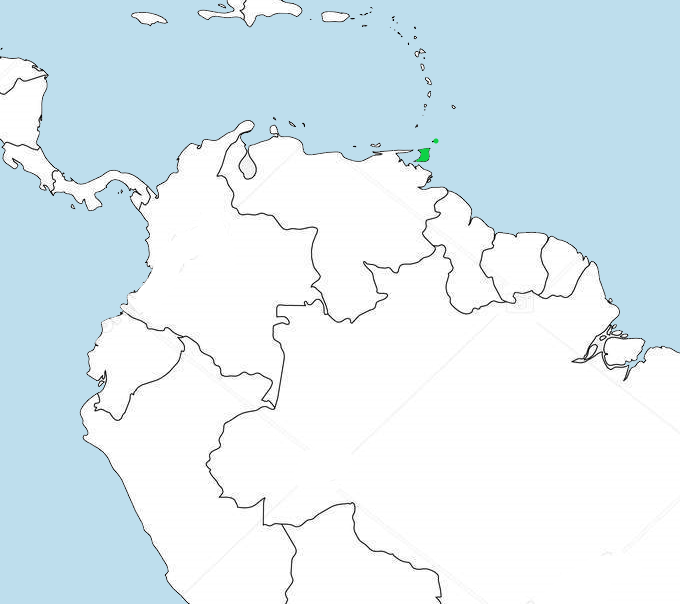

= Trinidad motmot =

Species of bird

The Trinidad and Tobago motmot (Momotus bahamensis) is a colourful Coraciiform afroavian endemic to the forests and woodlands of Trinidad and Tobago. It is a nonmigratory member of the Momotidae family and the Momotus genus. This species and the blue-capped motmot, Lesson's motmot, whooping motmot, Amazonian motmot, and Andean motmot were all considered conspecific. Though found on both islands, this bird is more abundant in Tobago than it is in Trinidad.

These birds are characterised by their colourful plumage, heavy bills, and low owl-like "hoot" call. Their underparts are a deep, rufous colour, with a slightly paler breast and an olive-green wash. The black eye-mask and blue-black racquet tails are also distinguishable features for this species.

These birds often sit still, and in their dense forest habitat can be difficult to see, despite their size. They eat small prey such as amphibians, small mammals, insects, spiders, earthworms, lizards, small snakes and fledgling birds, and will also regularly take fruit. They are known to eat small tree snails, and to use forest floor rocks as 'anvils' to crack open their hard shells, as well as the exoskeletons of crabs, beetles, and large millipedes, to access the soft edible bodies within.

Although little information is known about this species, the population is thought to be stable, and is considered least concern by the International Union for Conservation of Nature (IUCN). Despite its small range and unquantified population size, the Trinidad motmot is not believed to approach the thresholds for a vulnerable species under the range and population size criteria. There are no current conservation actions undertaken to protect this species.

The bird is shown on the front of the $5 bank note of Trinidad and Tobago.

== Taxonomy ==
The Trinidad motmot is a member of the order Coraciiformes, which includes the kingfishers, rollers, motmots, bee-eaters, and todies, and the genus Momotus, or motmots. Before the 21st Century, this species was widely thought to be conspecific with the blue-capped motmot, Lesson's motmot, whooping motmot, Amazonian motmot, and Andean motmot. The first nine or ten species of Momotus were recognised in the nineteenth and early twentieth century, although the first comprehensive attempt to determine genus differentiation did not occur until 1923 by Frank Chapman. In 1945, James L. Peters classified Chapman's "blue-crowned" group into M. momota in accordance with Carl Eduard Hellmayr's "biogeographic species concept." The Trinidad motmot was not suspected to be its own species until the early 2000's, when ornithologists recognised the numerous morphological, altitudinal, and vocal differences between other species.

Taxonomic revision of the Momotus genus has shown that phenotypical divergence of the Trinidad motmot occurred relatively recently and at a much faster rate than any other species in this group. There is, however, a possibility that these birds started differentiating long before rising sea levels severed the land connection to the Paria Peninsula in Venezuela. This is the case for Trinidad's other endemic bird, the Trinidad Piping Guan.

The Trinidad motmot has been totally isolated for at least the last 10–15,000 years, likely facilitating the fixation of unique alleles through genetic drift and natural selection. Because overwater dispersion is rarely seen in motmots, further phenotypic differentiation in the foreseeable future is very likely, especially with sea levels predicted to continue rising.

== Description ==
The Trinidad motmot is much more deeply and uniformly rufous below than other species in Momotus. Its throat is a deep, intense reddish-brown, while its breast is slightly paler and often has a faint, lateral olive-green wash. These birds' abdomens are almost as dark as their breasts, and their thighs contrast sharply with their green or blue-green colouring. The contrast between the two is much stronger compared to other species. Their black pectoral feathers have broad and conspicuous turquoise borders, while the tibial feathers are green to blue-green. Adults have a short black streak across their breast, a characteristic absent in juveniles (as well as blue breast feathers), making them identifiable. Males and females look similar, and the Trinidad motmot does not typically exhibit sexual dimorphism.

The extensive blue areas around the Trinidad motmot's mask distinguish it from all other members of the genus. Some individuals may have a noticeable blue-to-turquoise border that fades into green just before the diadem, while others have fainter feathers that are less prominent.

=== Diadem and Plumage ===
Its diadem, or crown-like marking on its head, consists of a broad, light turquoise blue circle that transitions to dark blue across the nape. The outer part from the eye backwards is violet, and a narrow black border outlines the rear portion. These birds usually have a rufous tint across their napes, although it may be more noticeable in some individuals than others.

The upper body is primarily green (with their wing feathers the palest and brightest) and the tail gradually transitions from green near the base to dark blue at the tip. These birds possess unique, paddle-like tail feathers, known as racquets, that are dark blue basally, with a broad black tip.

=== Vocalisation ===
The Trinidad motmot's call is a low-pitched, owl-like "hoot" that can be described as a "coo-coo" or "ooo-doot." Unlike motmots with single-note calls, this species has a distinct two-note call. The first note is typically shorter and lower-pitched, with a noticeable drop in pitch at the end, while the second note is longer. The songs end abruptly, with a noticeable decrease in both amplitude and frequency.

=== Size and Morphology ===
The Trinidad motmot is approximately 46 cm (18.1 in) in total length and averages 111.4 g (3.9 oz). Wing lengths differ by sex, with males averaging 135.2 mm (5.3 in) with a range of 133 to 138 mm (5.2 to 5.4 in), whereas females average 137.9 mm (5.4 in) with a range of 133 to 142 mm (5.2 to 5.6 in). Tail lengths range from 214 mm (8.4 in) to 240 mm (9.4 in) in males, and from 215.5 mm (8.5 in) to 235.0 mm (9.3 in) in females. This bird has significantly larger bill and tail dimensions than other members of Momotus.

== Habitat and Distribution ==
The Trinidad motmot is a nonmigratory bird that resides exclusively on the islands of Trinidad and Tobago, although it is more abundant in Tobago than it is in Trinidad. They primarily inhabit forested habitats and wooded regions, including both lowland and coastal forests. The species is adaptable and can also be found in marine intertidal zones, where wooded environments are present.

This species is unique, as its geographic isolation is more pronounced than that of any other member of the Momotidae family, due its island restriction. Its nonmigratory behaviour also suggests that the species is unlikely to expand beyond its current estimated extent of occurrence of 11,700 square kilometres.

There is a significant lack of information regarding the distribution of Trinidad motmot populations across the islands, including the exact number of mature individuals and if there has been an increase or decrease in numbers in recent years. Despite this, the current population is thought to be stable with no significant fragmentation, and it is estimated that the average generation is approximately 3.6 years. While their upper elevation limit is not well-documented, their lower elevation limit is 0 m (0 ft), or sea-level.

Trinidad motmots have demonstrated an ability to live and function within some human altered/created habitats, including plantations, pastures, and even rural residential gardens. This adaptability may contribute to its resilience, as there are no known major threats to the species, suggesting that the population is likely to remain stable or potentially increase in the coming decades.

== Behaviour ==
=== Diet and Foraging ===
Trinidad motmots are opportunistic, adaptable feeders and generally eat berries, large invertebrates (including beetles, centipedes, millipedes, scorpions, and cockroaches), and small vertebrates like frogs, and small birds and lizards. This varied diet reflects the bird's adaptability to different environments and availability of prey.

Research has shown that Trinidad Motmots occasionally use rocks as anvils to break open terrestrial snail shells, a behavior that indicates borderline tool use—a behavior previously unrecorded in this species and family. The use of rocks as anvils may allow these birds to access nutrient-rich food sources that would otherwise be inaccessible, potentially enhancing their survival during periods when other food sources are scarce.

Other Momotidae species like the blue-capped motmot have been observed striking live animal prey against tree branches and other hard objects to kill before consumption. In addition to incapacitating the prey, this practice may make it easier to feed to their young.

=== Moulting ===
Although there is limited information regarding moulting patterns in Trinidad motmot individuals it is estimated to be a slow process, lasting around four months from June to October. The species is considered nonmigratory, further suggesting that moulting occurs gradually rather than as part of a migratory preparation.
