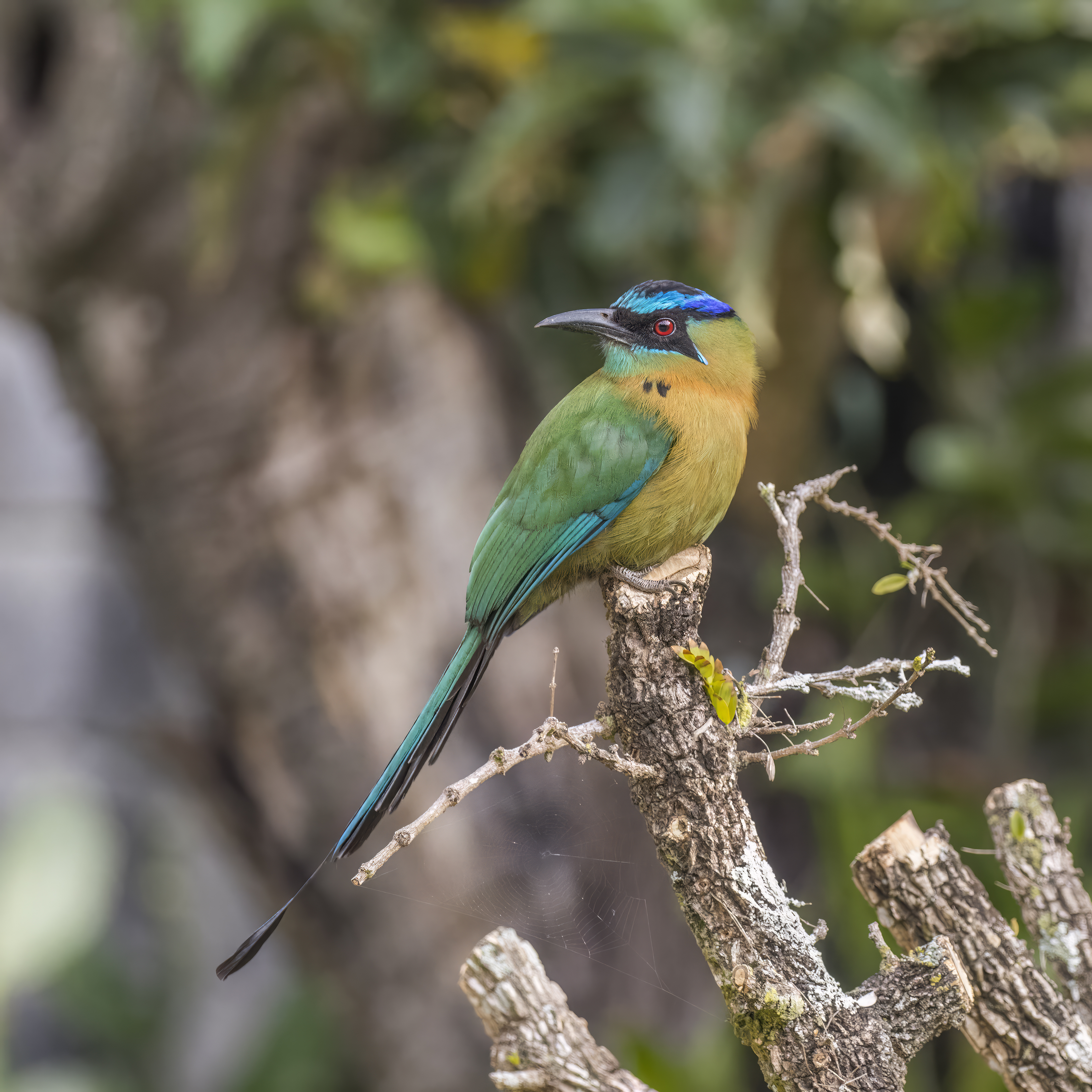
- M. l. lessonii Heredia, Costa Rica

Conservation status
- Least Concern (IUCN 3.1)

Scientific classification
- Kingdom: Animalia
- Phylum: Chordata
- Class: Aves
- Order: Coraciiformes
- Family: Momotidae
- Genus: Momotus
- Species: M. lessonii

Binomial name
- Momotus lessonii Lesson, 1842

Subspecies
- See text
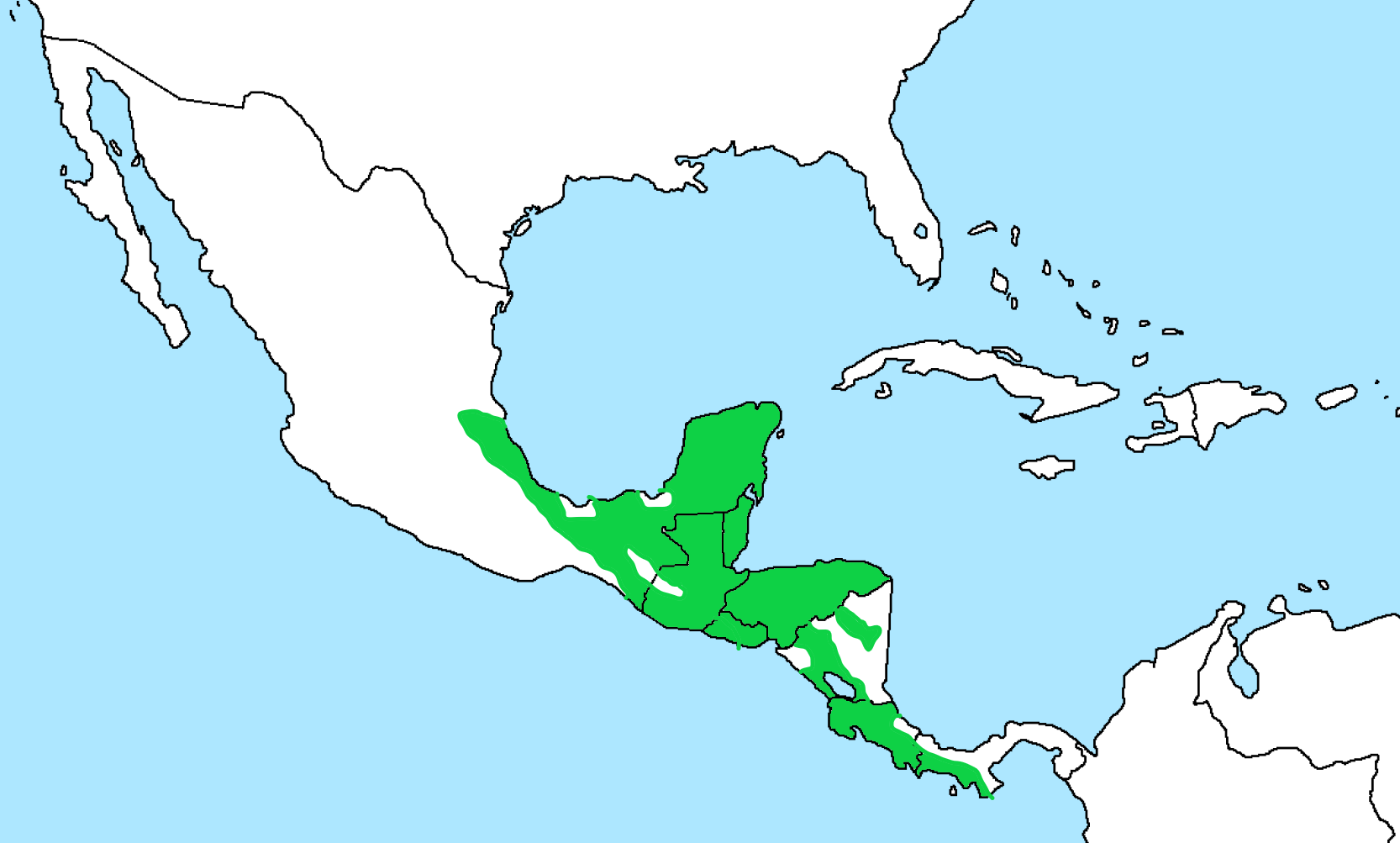

= Lesson's motmot =

Species of bird

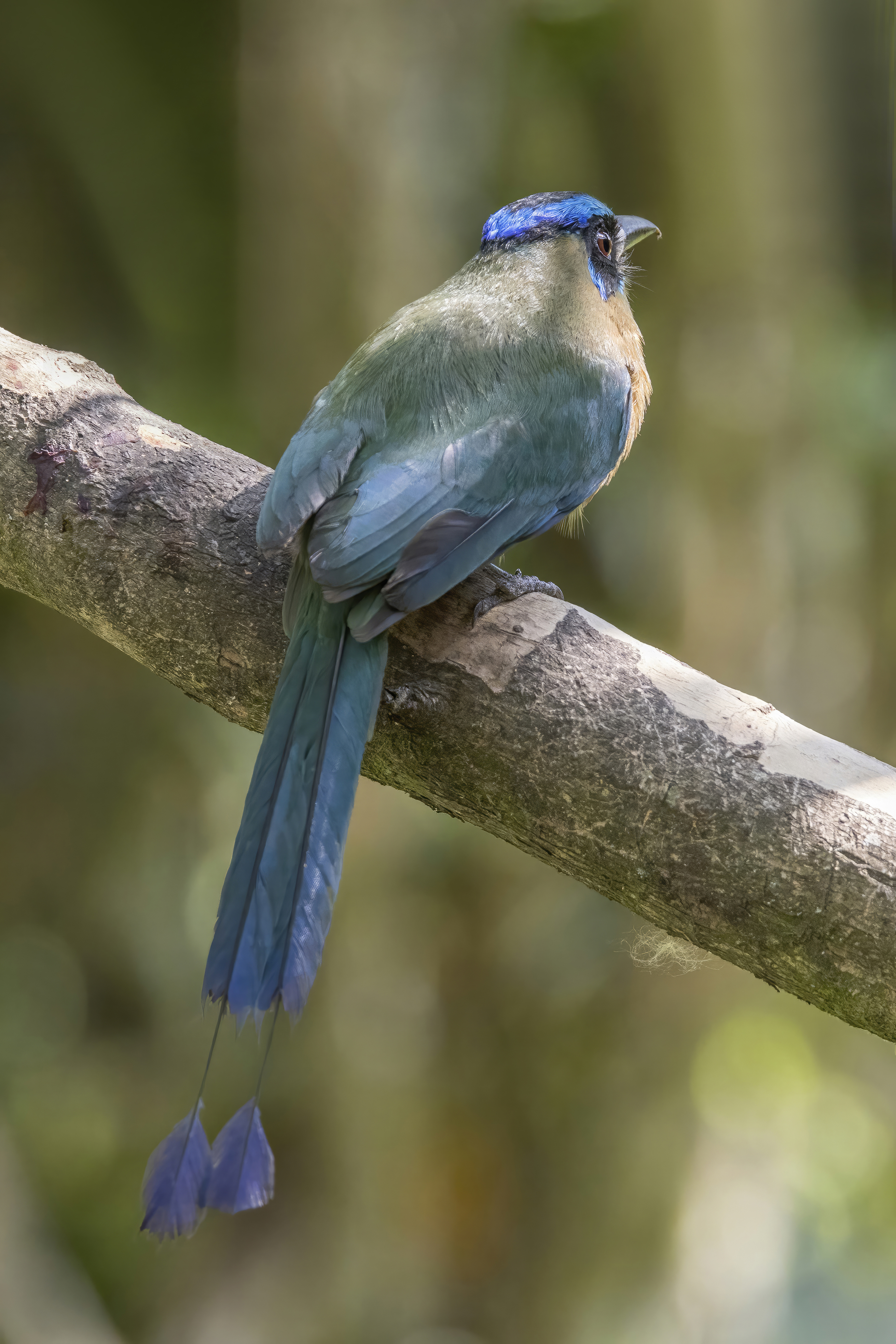
M. l. lessonii showing tail feathers

Lesson's motmot (Momotus lessonii) or the blue-diademed motmot, is a colorful bird found in forests and woodlands of southern Mexico to western Panama. This species and the blue-capped motmot, whooping motmot, Trinidad motmot, Amazonian motmot, and Andean motmot were all considered conspecific.

== Description ==
The central crown is black and surrounded by a blue band. There is a black eyemask. The call is a low owl-like ooo-doot.

These birds often sit still, and in their dense forest habitat can be difficult to see, despite their size. They eat small prey such as insects and lizards, and will also regularly take fruit.

Like most of the Coraciiformes, motmots nest in tunnels in banks, laying about three or four white eggs.

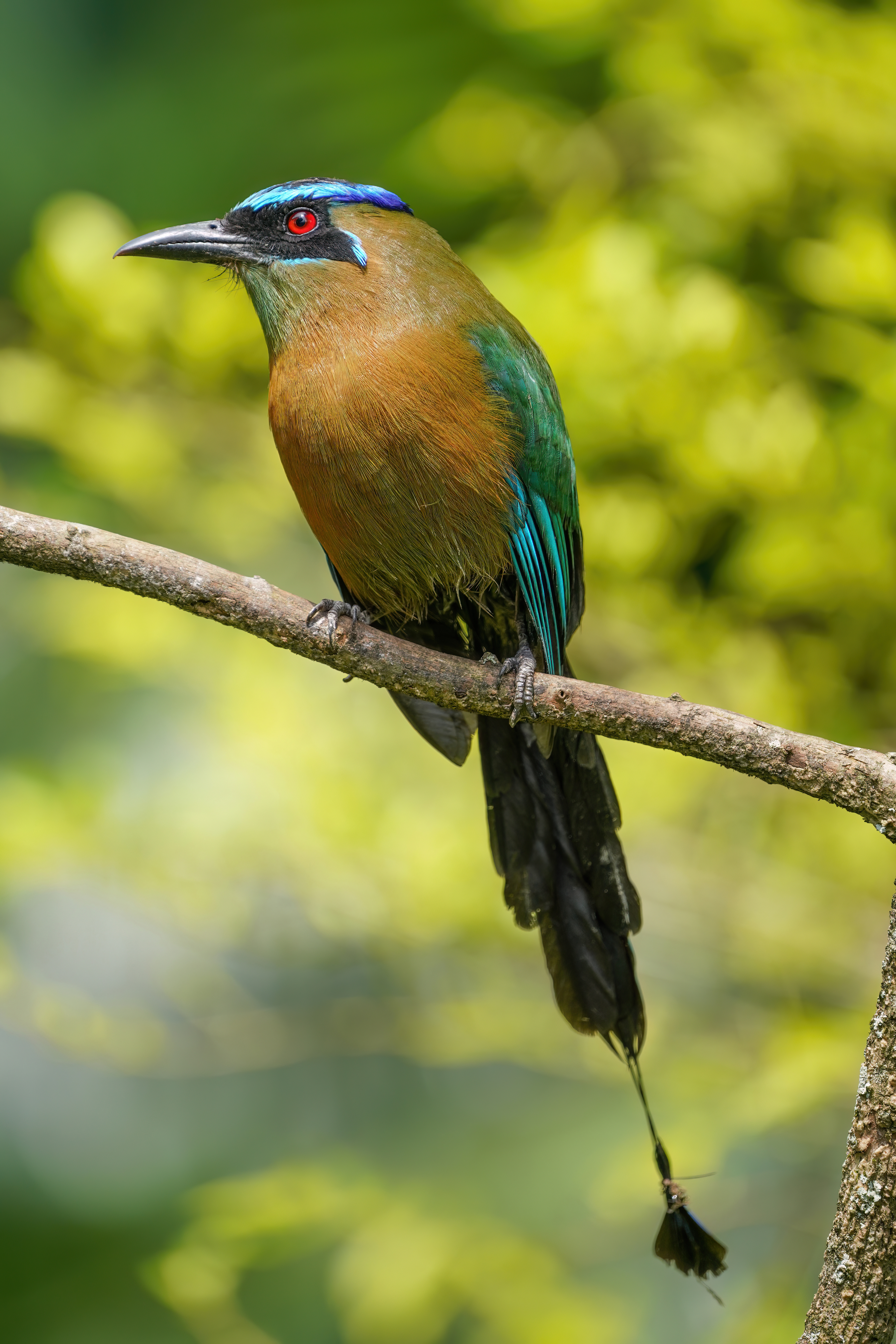
Lesson's motmot in Costa Rica

== Subspecies ==
The Lesson's motmot has three subspecies:

- M. l. goldmani Nelson, 1900 - southwestern Mexico to northern Guatemala
- M. l. exiguus Ridgway, 1912 - Campeche and Yucatán (southern Mexico)
- M. l. lessonii Lesson, R., 1842 - Chiapas (southern Mexico) to western Panama
