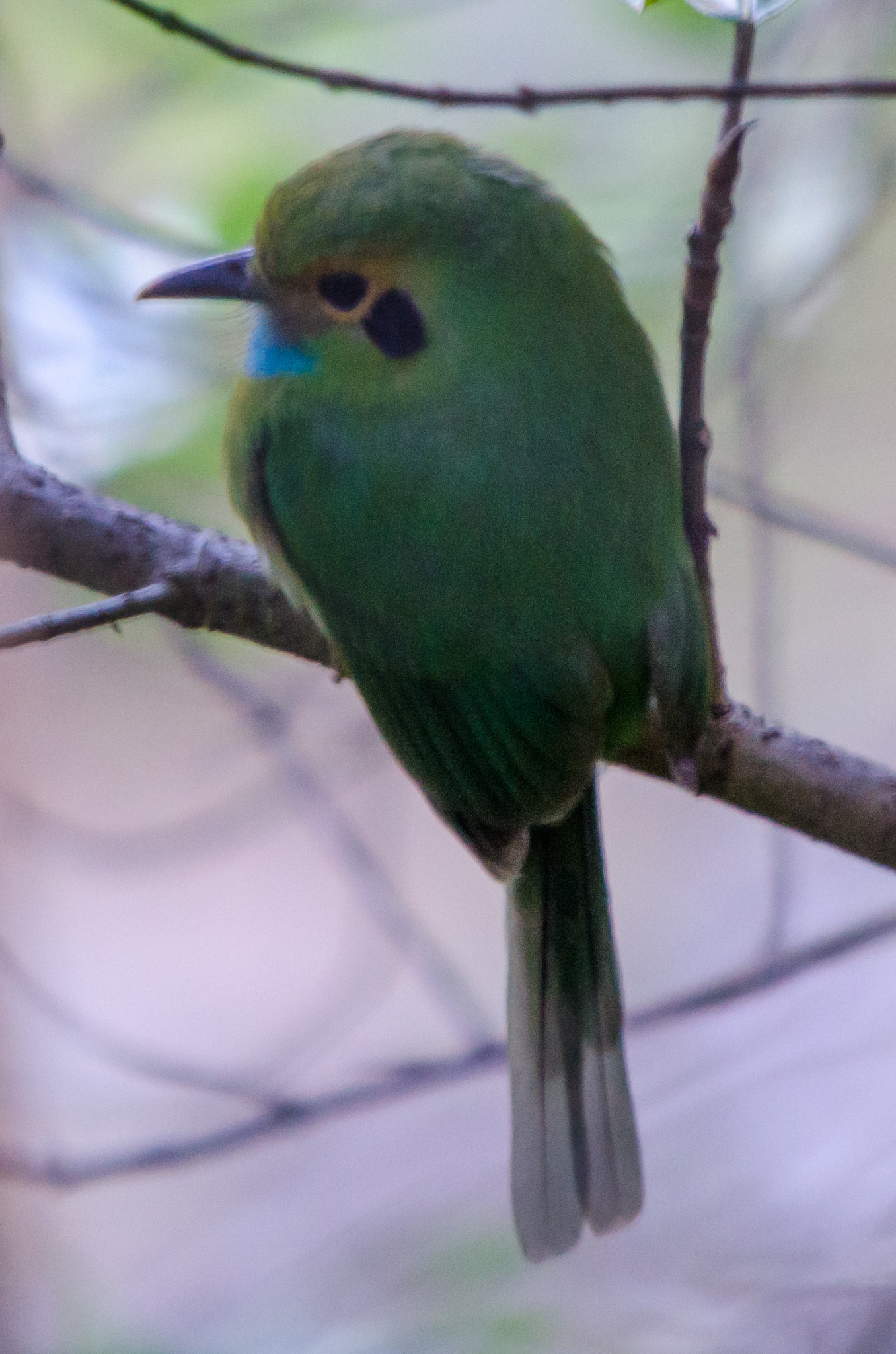

Conservation status
- Least Concern (IUCN 3.1)

Scientific classification
- Kingdom: Animalia
- Phylum: Chordata
- Class: Aves
- Order: Coraciiformes
- Family: Momotidae
- Genus: Aspatha; Sharpe, 1892
- Species: A. gularis

Binomial name
- Aspatha gularis (Lafresnaye, 1840)
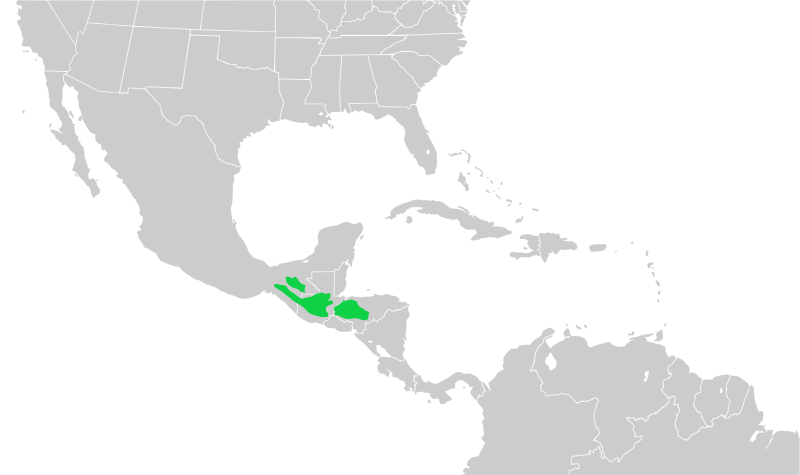

= Blue-throated motmot =

Species of bird

The blue-throated motmot (Aspatha gularis) is a species of bird in the family Momotidae. It is found in El Salvador, Guatemala, Honduras, and Mexico.

== Taxonomy and systematics ==
The blue-throated motmot is monotypic. It apparently has no close relatives.

== Description ==
The blue-throated motmot is 25.5 to 28.0 cm (10.0 to 11.0 in) long and weighs 56.0 to 67.3 g (1.98 to 2.37 oz). It has a long, graduated, tail that in contrast to that of most other motmots does not have racquet tips. The side of the adult's head is ochre with a black "ear" spot. It is mostly green above and paler green below. The throat is blue with a black spot just below it. The juvenile is duller and the green of the back is washed with olive.

== Distribution and habitat ==
The blue-throated motmot is found from Oaxaca and Chiapas in Mexico south and east through Guatemala and a bit of El Salvador to Honduras. It inhabits montane evergreen and pine forest of medium to high humidity. In elevation it ranges from 1,300 to 3,000 m (4,300 to 9,800 ft) in Mexico but in Honduras it is not found below 1,800 m (5,900 ft).

== Behavior ==
=== Feeding ===
The blue-throated motmot forages by plucking insects, especially beetles, from foliage while flying. It also eats some fruit and apparently feeds fruit to nestlings.

=== Breeding ===
The blue-throated motmot nests in a burrow that it excavates in an earth bank; the burrows can be up to 1.8 m (5.9 ft) long and often have bends in them. In Guatemala it lays eggs in April, and a fledgling was collected in late May in Mexico. The clutch size is three.

=== Vocalization ===
The blue-throated motmot typically calls from a high exposed perch. It usually gives single "hoot" or "huuk" notes but sometimes strings them together as "hoodloodloodloodl..." .

== Status ==
The IUCN has assessed the blue-throated motmot as being of Least Concern. Though its population appears to be decreasing, its population and range are large enough to achieve that rating
