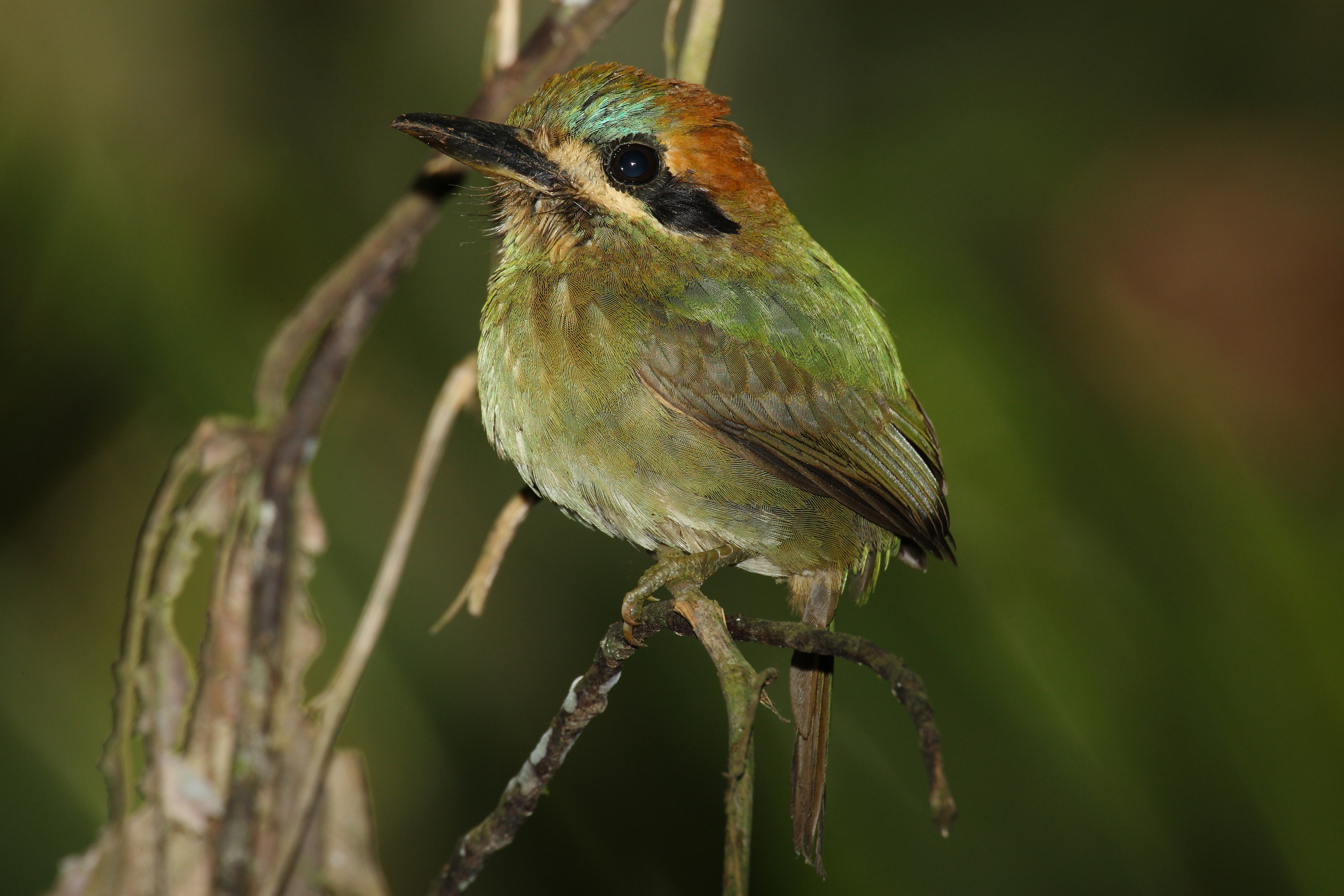

Conservation status
- Least Concern (IUCN 3.1)

Scientific classification
- Kingdom: Animalia
- Phylum: Chordata
- Class: Aves
- Order: Coraciiformes
- Family: Momotidae
- Genus: Hylomanes; Lichtenstein, MHC, 1839
- Species: H. momotula

Binomial name
- Hylomanes momotula Lichtenstein, MHC, 1839
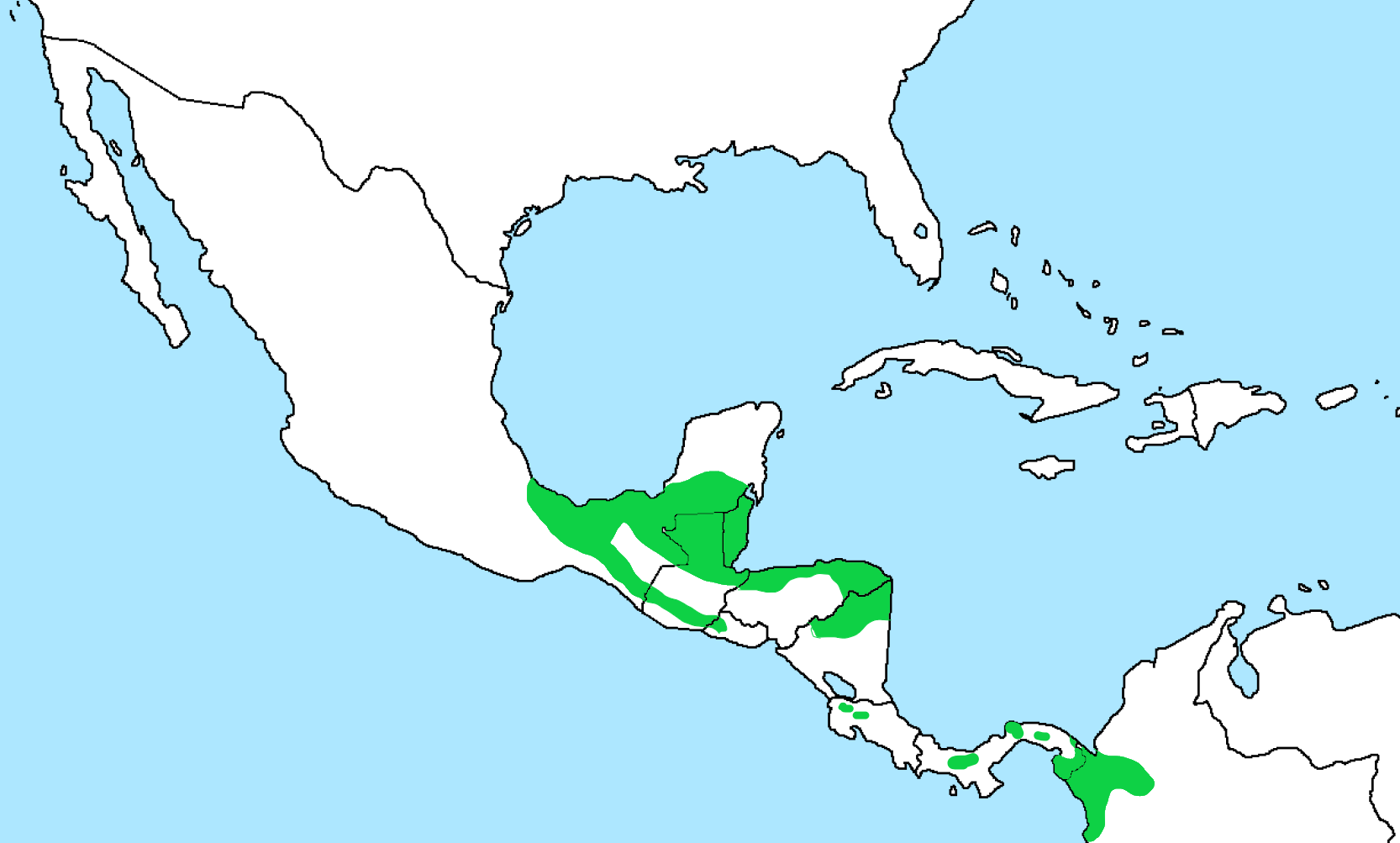

= Tody motmot =

Species of bird

The tody motmot (Hylomanes momotula) is a species of bird in the motmot family Momotidae. It is the only species placed in the genus Hylomanes. It is found in Belize, Colombia, Costa Rica, El Salvador, Guatemala, Honduras, Mexico, Nicaragua, and Panama.

== Taxonomy and systematics ==
The tody motmot is the sole member of its genus. It has three subspecies, the nominate Hylomanes momotula momotula, Lichtenstein, MHC, 1939, M. m. chiapensis (Brodkorb, 1938), and M. m. obscurus (Nelson, 1911).

== Description ==
The tody motmot is 16.5 to 18.0 cm (6.5 to 7.1 in) long. Males weigh 27 to 33 g (0.95 to 1.16 oz) and females 25 to 30 g (0.88 to 1.06 oz). It is by far the smallest motmot, and named because it resembles the closely related todies (family Todidae) of the Caribbean. The nominate subspecies has a green crown, a rufous neck, and a green back and rump. It has a blue supercilium and a black mask with a white stripe below it. It has a white throat, a greenish breast with light streaks, and a white belly. The other two subspecies are similar but darker, and M. m. obscurus also has less white on the throat.

== Distribution and habitat ==
The tody motmot ranges from southern Mexico through Central America into Colombia. The nominate subspecies is the most widespread; it is found from Veracruz and Oaxaca in Mexico east and south through Belize, Guatemala, Honduras, and El Salvador at least to Nicaragua and possibly into Costa Rica. M. m. chiapensis is found in Chiapas, Mexico, Guatemala, and possibly El Salvador. M. m. obscurus is found in Panama and northwestern Colombia. The tody motmot inhabits humid evergreen forest from sea level to 1,850 m (6,070 ft) elevation. It is especially partial to ravines.

== Behavior ==
=== Feeding ===
The tody motmot's diet includes insects, spiders, and snails. Unlike most other motmots, it has not been recorded to eat fruit. It plucks prey from vegetation while flying and also captures butterflies and dragonflies on the wing.

=== Breeding ===
The tody motmot's breeding phenology is mostly unknown. In Belize, an adult was seen carrying food in June and an adult and fledgling were seen in early July. A fledgling was collected in Guatemala in June. In Chocó Department, Colombia, an egg-laying female was collected in February, and in Antioquia Department a female in breeding condition was collected in May. The nest is unrecorded.

=== Vocalization ===
One of the tody motmot's vocalizations is a "resonant, far-carrying, gruff-sounding 'kwa-kwa-kwa-kwa...' or 'quah quah quah quah...'" . Another is " loud, penetrating, hollow 'whoop!' notes" .

== Status ==
The IUCN has assessed the tody motmot as being of Least Concern. It varies from very uncommon to common in different parts of its fragmented range.
