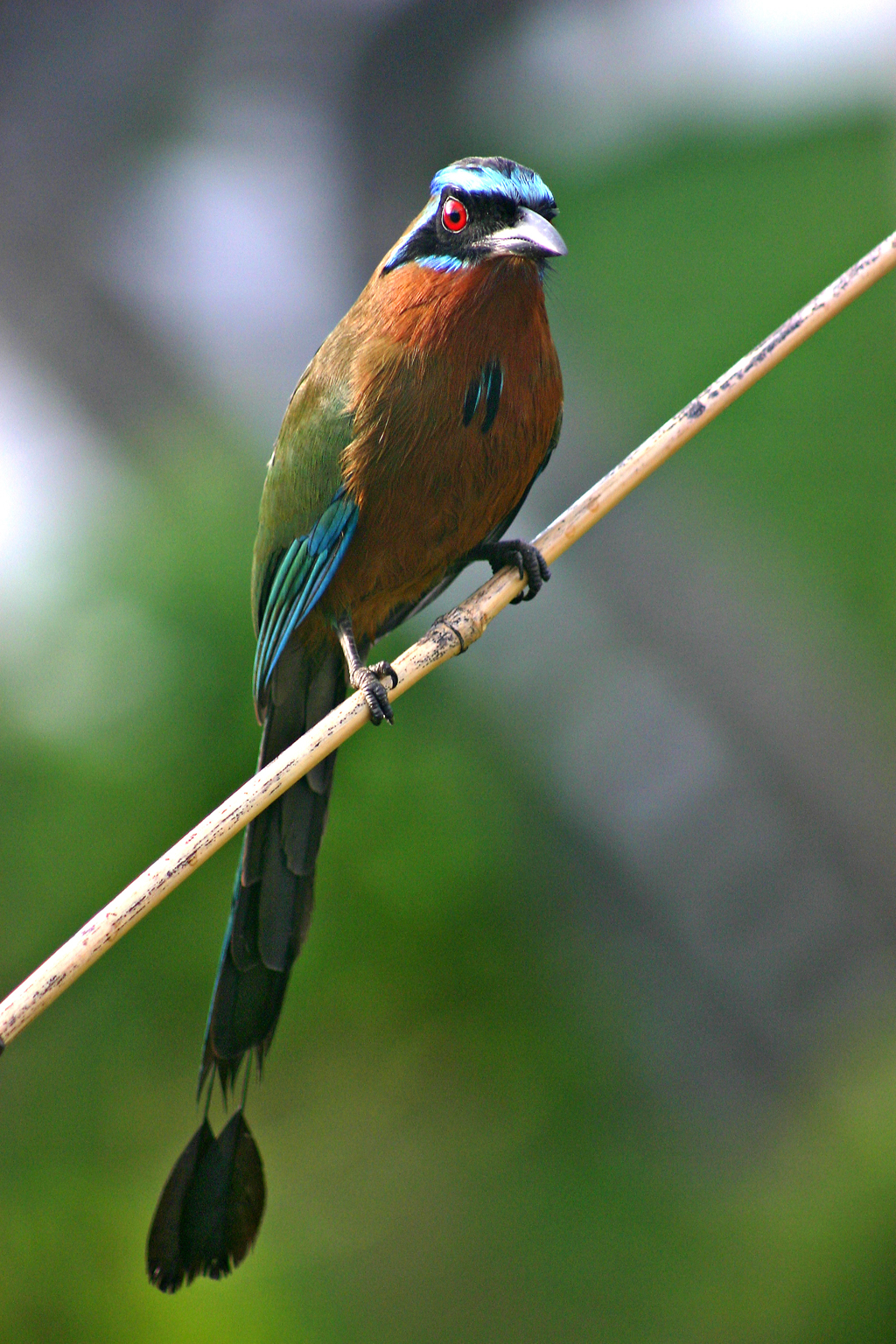
- Trinidad motmot (Momotus bahamensis)

Scientific classification
- Kingdom: Animalia
- Phylum: Chordata
- Class: Aves
- Order: Coraciiformes
- Family: Momotidae
- Genus: Momotus; Brisson, 1760

Type species
- Ramphastos momota Linnaeus, 1766

Species
- see text

= Momotus =

Genus of birds

Momotus is a small genus of the motmots, a family of birds found in forest and woodland of the Neotropics. They have a colourful plumage, which is green on the back becoming blue on the flight feathers and the long tails. The barbs near the ends of the two longest central tail feathers fall off, leaving a length of bare shaft so that tails appear racket-shaped.

Momotus species, like other motmots, eat small prey such as insects and lizards, and will also take fruit. They nest in tunnels in banks, laying about four white eggs.

The genus Momotus was introduced by the French zoologist Mathurin Jacques Brisson in 1760 with the Amazonian motmot (Momotus momota) as the type species.

== Species ==
The species complex, the blue-crowned motmot (Momotus momota), has been split into several species. The genus now contains seven species:

Image	Scientific name	Common name	Distribution
	Momotus mexicanus	Russet-crowned motmot	Guatemala and Mexico
	Momotus momota	Amazonian motmot	eastern Venezuela to north-eastern Argentina
	Momotus coeruliceps	Blue-capped motmot	eastern Mexico
	Momotus aequatorialis	Andean motmot	northern Colombia to western Bolivia
	Momotus bahamensis	Trinidad motmot	Trinidad and Tobago
	Momotus lessonii	Lesson's motmot	southern Mexico to western Panama
	Momotus subrufescens	Whooping motmot	southern Panama to northwestern Peru
