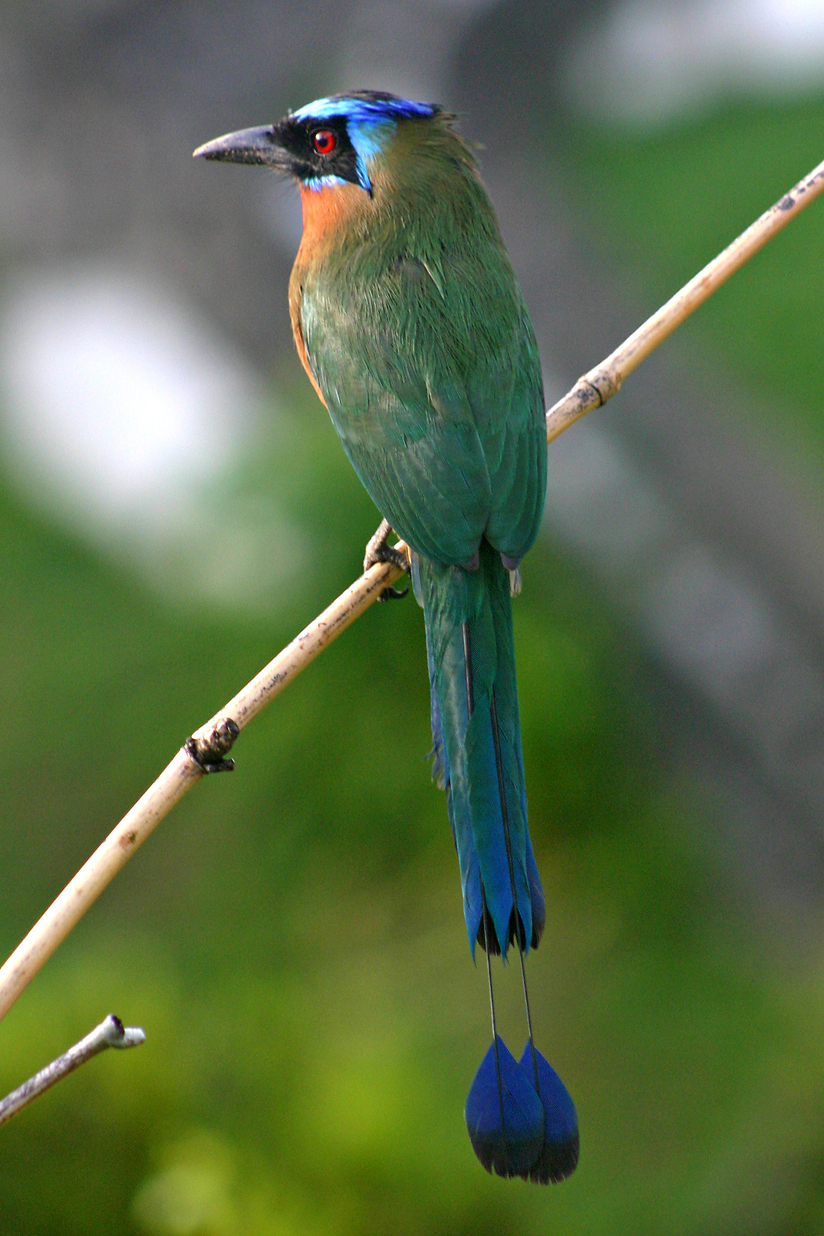
- Trinidad motmot Momotus bahamensis

Scientific classification
- Kingdom: Animalia
- Phylum: Chordata
- Class: Aves
- Order: Coraciiformes
- Family: Momotidae; GR Gray, 1840

Genera
- Aspatha; Baryphthengus; Electron; Eumomota; Hylomanes; Momotus

= Motmot =

Motmots

Family of birds

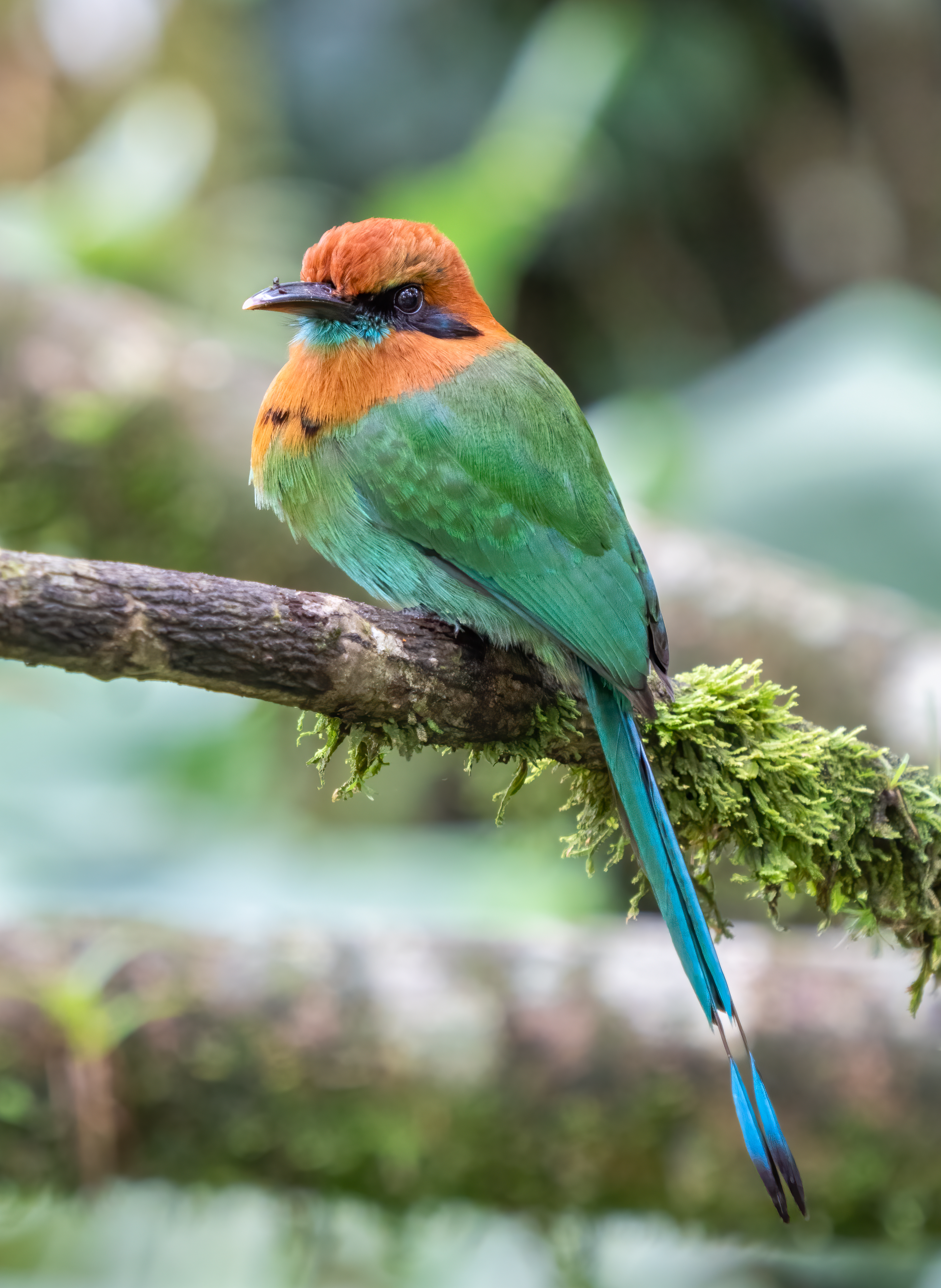
Broad-billed motmot

The motmots or Momotidae are a family of birds in the order Coraciiformes, which also includes the kingfishers, bee-eaters and rollers. All extant motmots are restricted to woodland or forests in the Neotropics, and the largest are in Central America. They have a colourful plumage and a relatively heavy bill. All except the tody motmot (Hylomanes momotula) have relatively long tails that in some species have a distinctive racket-like tip.

== Behaviour ==
Motmots eat small prey such as insects and lizards, and will also take fruit. In Nicaragua and Costa Rica, motmots have been observed feeding on poison dart frogs.

Like most of the Coraciiformes, motmots nest in tunnels in banks, laying about four white eggs. Some species form large colonies of up to 40 paired individuals. The eggs hatch after about 20 days, and the young leave the nest after another 30 days. Both parents care for the young.

Motmots often move their tails back and forth in a wag-display that commonly draws attention to an otherwise hidden bird. Research indicates that motmots perform the wag-display when they detect predators (based on studies on turquoise-browed motmot) and that the display is likely to communicate that the motmot is aware of the predator and is prepared to escape. This form of interspecific pursuit-deterrent signal provides a benefit to both the motmot and the predator: the display prevents the motmot from wasting time and energy fleeing, and the predator avoids a costly pursuit that is unlikely to result in capture.

The largest concentration of motmots reside in Honduras and Guatemala, with a total of 7 subspecies. It is also the national bird of Nicaragua and El Salvador.

There is also evidence that the male tail, which is slightly larger than the female tail, functions as a sexual signal in the turquoise-browed motmot.

In several species of motmots, the barbs near the ends of the two longest (central) tail feathers are weak and fall off due to abrasion with substrates, or fall off during preening, leaving a length of bare shaft, thus creating the racket shape of the tail. It was, however, wrongly believed in the past that the motmot shaped its tail by plucking part of the feather web to leave the racket. This was based on inaccurate reports made by Charles William Beebe. It has since been shown that these barbs are weakly attached and fall off due to abrasion with substrates and during routine preening. There are, however, also several species where the tail is "normal", these being the tody motmot, blue-throated motmot, rufous-capped motmot, and the Amazonian populations of the rufous and broad-billed motmots.

== Taxonomy ==
A fossil genus of Oligocene coraciiform from Switzerland has been described as Protornis; it might be a primitive motmot or a more basal lineage. A partial momotid humerus found in early Hemphilian (Late Miocene, c. 8 mya) deposits in Alachua County, USA has not been named; it might belong to an extant genus.

The phylogenetic relationship between the six families that make up the order Coraciiformes is shown in the cladogram below. The number of species in each family is taken from the list maintained by Frank Gill, Pamela C. Rasmussen and David Donsker on behalf of the International Ornithological Committee (IOC).

- Coraciiformes
  - - Meropidae – bee-eaters (31 species)
    - - Brachypteraciidae – ground rollers (5 species)
      - Coraciidae – rollers (13 species)
  - - Todidae – todies (5 species)
    - - Momotidae – motmots (14 species)
      - Alcedinidae – kingfishers (118 species)
