= List of jacamars =

Jacamars are birds in the family Galbulidae in the order Piciformes. There are currently 18 extant species of jacamars recognised by the International Ornithologists' Union.

== Conventions ==
IUCN Red List categories
Conservation status
- EX: Extinct (0 species)
- EW: Extinct in the wild (0 species)
- CR: Critically endangered (0 species)
- EN: Endangered (0 species)
- VU: Vulnerable (0 species)
- NT: Near threatened (1 species)
- LC: Least concern (17 species)

Conservation status codes listed follow the International Union for Conservation of Nature (IUCN) Red List of Threatened Species. Range maps are provided wherever possible; if a range map is not available, a description of the jacamar's range is provided. Ranges are based on the IOC World Bird List for that species unless otherwise noted. Population estimates are of the number of mature individuals and are taken from the IUCN Red List.

This list follows the taxonomic treatment (designation and order of species) and nomenclature (scientific and common names) of version 13.2 of the IOC World Bird List. Where the taxonomy proposed by the IOC World Bird List conflicts with the taxonomy followed by the IUCN (Note: The IUCN follows the taxonomy proposed by the HBW and BirdLife Taxonomic Checklist.) or the 2023 edition of The Clements Checklist of Birds of the World, the disagreement is noted next to the species's common name (for nomenclatural disagreements) or scientific name (for taxonomic disagreements).

== Classification ==
The International Ornithologists' Union (IOU) recognises 18 species of jacamars in five genera. This list does not include hybrid species, extinct prehistoric species, or putative species not yet accepted by the IOU.

Family Galbulidae

- Genus Galbalcyrhynchus: two species
- Genus Brachygalba: four species
- Genus Jacamaralcyon: one species
- Genus Galbula: ten species
- Genus Jacamerops: one species

== Jacamars ==
Genus Galbalcyrhynchus – Des Murs, 1845 – 2 species
Common name	Scientific name and subspecies	Range	IUCN status and estimated population
White-eared jacamar	G. leucotis Des Murs, 1845	Western Amazon rainforest	LC Unknown
Purus jacamar	G. purusianus Goeldi, 1904	Southwestern Amazon rainforest	LC Unknown

Genus Brachygalba – Bonaparte, 1854 – 4 species
Common name	Scientific name and subspecies	Range	IUCN status and estimated population
Dusky-backed jacamar	B. salmoni Sclater, P. L. & Salvin, 1879	Eastern Panama and northwestern Colombia	LC 20,000–49,999
Pale-headed jacamar	B. goeringi Sclater, P. L. & Salvin, 1869	Northeastern Colombia and northwestern Venezuela	LC Unknown
Brown jacamar	B. lugubris (Swainson, 1838) Seven subspecies: B. l. fulviventris; B. l. caquetae; B. l. lugubris; B. l. obscuriceps; B. l. naumburgae; B. l. phaeonota; B. l. melanosterna	South America	LC Unknown
White-throated jacamar	B. albogularis (Spix, 1824)	Western Amazon rainforest	LC Unknown

Genus Jacamaralcyon – Lesson, R. P., 1830 – 1 species
Common name	Scientific name and subspecies	Range	IUCN status and estimated population
Three-toed jacamar	J. tridactyla (Vieillot, 1817)	Southeastern Brazil	NT 1,300–5,400

Genus Galbula – Brisson, 1760 – 10 species
Common name	Scientific name and subspecies	Range	IUCN status and estimated population
Yellow-billed jacamar	G. albirostris Latham, 1790 Two subspecies: G. a. chalcocephala; G. a. albirostris	Northern Amazon rainforest	LC Unknown
Blue-necked jacamar	G. cyanicollis Cassin, 1851	Southern Amazon rainforest	LC Unknown
Rufous-tailed jacamar	G. ruficauda Cuvier, 1816 Six subspecies: G. r. melanogenia; G. r. ruficauda; G. r. pallens; G. r. brevirostris; G. r. rufoviridis; G. r. heterogyna	Central and South America	LC 500,000–4,999,999
Green-tailed jacamar	G. galbula (Linnaeus, 1766)	Northern Amazon rainforest	LC Unknown
Coppery-chested jacamar	G. pastazae Taczanowski & Berlepsch, 1885	Southern Colombia to eastern Ecuador	LC 42,000
White-chinned jacamar	G. tombacea Spix, 1824 Two subspecies: G. t. tombacea; G. t. mentalis	Northwestern Amazon rainforest	LC Unknown
Bluish-fronted jacamar	G. cyanescens Deville, 1849	Western Amazon rainforest	LC Unknown
Purplish jacamar	G. chalcothorax Sclater, P. L., 1855	Western Amazon rainforest	LC Unknown
Bronzy jacamar	G. leucogastra Vieillot, 1817	Western Amazon rainforest	LC Unknown
Paradise jacamar	G. dea (Linnaeus, 1758) Four subspecies: G. d. dea; G. d. amazonum; G. d. brunneiceps; G. d. phainopepla	Amazon rainforest	LC Unknown

Genus Jacamerops – Lesson, R. P., 1830 – 1 species
Common name	Scientific name and subspecies	Range	IUCN status and estimated population
Great jacamar	J. aureus (Müller, P. L. S., 1776) Four subspecies: J. a. penardi; J. a. aureus; J. a. ridgwayi; J. a. isidori	Central and South America	LC 500,000–4,999,999
