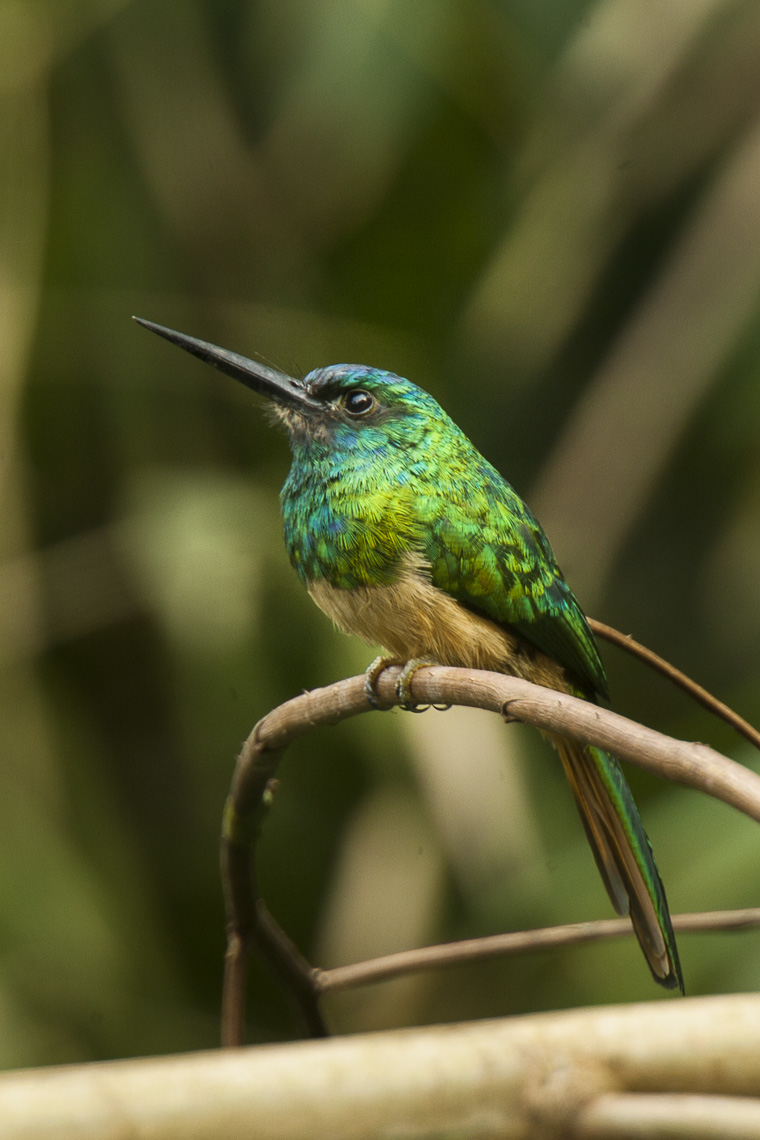

Conservation status
- Least Concern (IUCN 3.1)

Scientific classification
- Kingdom: Animalia
- Phylum: Chordata
- Class: Aves
- Order: Piciformes
- Family: Galbulidae
- Genus: Galbula
- Species: G. cyanescens

Binomial name
- Galbula cyanescens Deville, 1849

= Bluish-fronted jacamar =

Species of bird

The bluish-fronted jacamar (Galbula cyanescens) is a species of bird in the family Galbulidae. It is found in Bolivia, Brazil, and Peru.

== Taxonomy and systematics ==
The bluish-fronted jacamar is monotypic. It and the rufous-tailed (Galbula ruficauda), white-chinned (G. tombacea), coppery-chested (G. pastazae), and green-tailed jacamars (G. galbula) are considered to form a superspecies.

== Description ==
The bluish-fronted jacamar is 20 to 23 cm (7.9 to 9.1 in) long and weighs 22 to 26 g (0.78 to 0.92 oz). The male's crown, including the forehead ("front") is metallic green to bluish and the upper parts are metallic green with a bluish gloss. The chin and upper throat are blackish, the lower throat and chest green, and the rest of the underparts rufous. The female differs only in that the lower breast and belly are ochraceous.

== Distribution and habitat ==
The bluish-fronted jacamar is found east of the Andes and south of the Amazon River, in eastern Peru, in western Brazil as far east as the Madeira River, and south into Bolivia's La Paz Department. It inhabits humid primary forest, gallery forest, and secondary forest up to 1,000 m (3,300 ft) elevation. It is typically found in mid-stage succession vegetation along the forest edges and especially along watercourses and lakesides.

== Behavior ==
=== Feeding ===
The bluish-fronted jacamar's diet has not been described in detail but is believed to be many kinds of flying insects. It perches on exposed branches or in scrub and sallies from there to capture its prey. It sometimes joins mixed-species foraging flocks.

=== Breeding ===
The bluish-fronted jacamar's breeding phenology has not been documented.

=== Vocalization ===
The bluish-fronted jacamar's song is rendered as "kip kip-kip-kipkikikrkrkrrr-kree-kree-kree-kip-kip-kikikrrrrreeuw" .

== Status ==
The IUCN has assessed the bluish-fronted jacamar as being of Least Concern. It appears to be common throughout its range and occurs in several protected areas.
