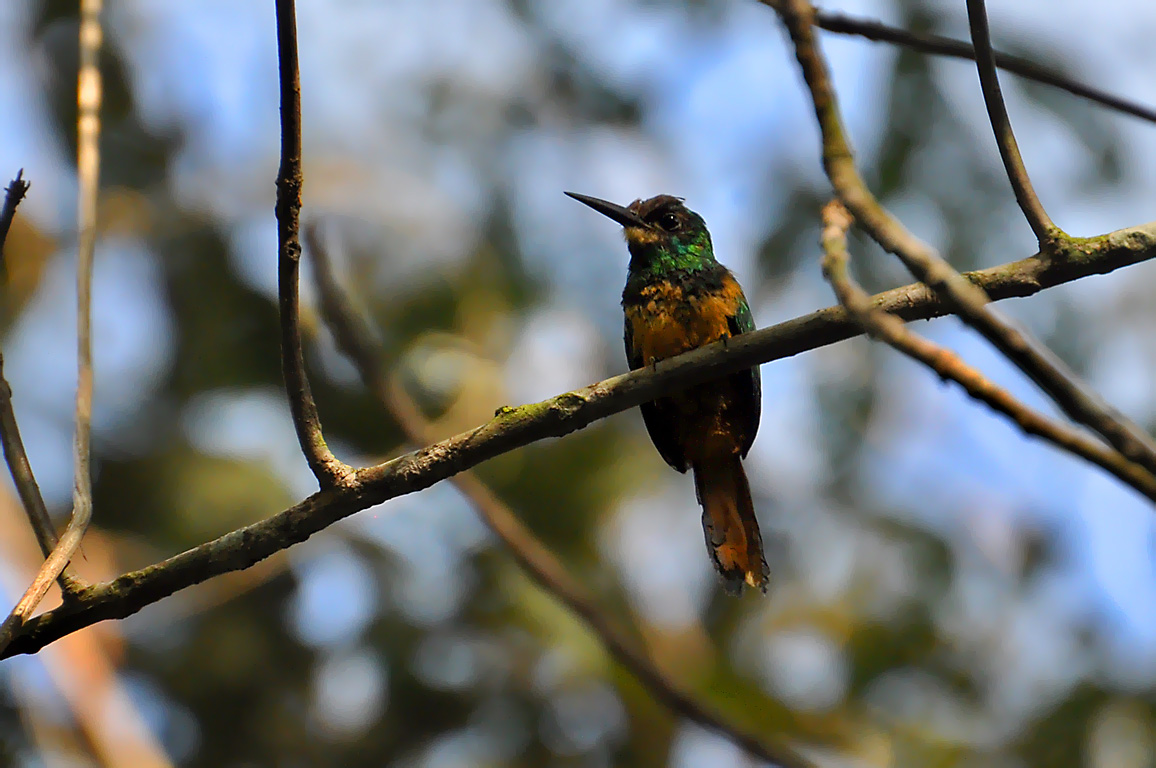

Conservation status
- Least Concern (IUCN 3.1)

Scientific classification
- Kingdom: Animalia
- Phylum: Chordata
- Class: Aves
- Order: Piciformes
- Family: Galbulidae
- Genus: Galbula
- Species: G. tombacea

Binomial name
- Galbula tombacea Spix, 1824

= White-chinned jacamar =

Species of bird

The white-chinned jacamar (Galbula tombacea) is a species of bird in the family Galbulidae. It is found in Brazil, Colombia, Ecuador, and Peru.

== Taxonomy and systematics ==
The white-chinned jacamar and the rufous-tailed (Galbula ruficauda), bluish-fronted (G. cyanescens), coppery-chested (G. pastazae), and green-tailed jacamars (G. galbula) are considered to form a superspecies. The white-chinned jacamar has two subspecies, the nominate Galbula tombacea tombacea and G. t. mentalis.

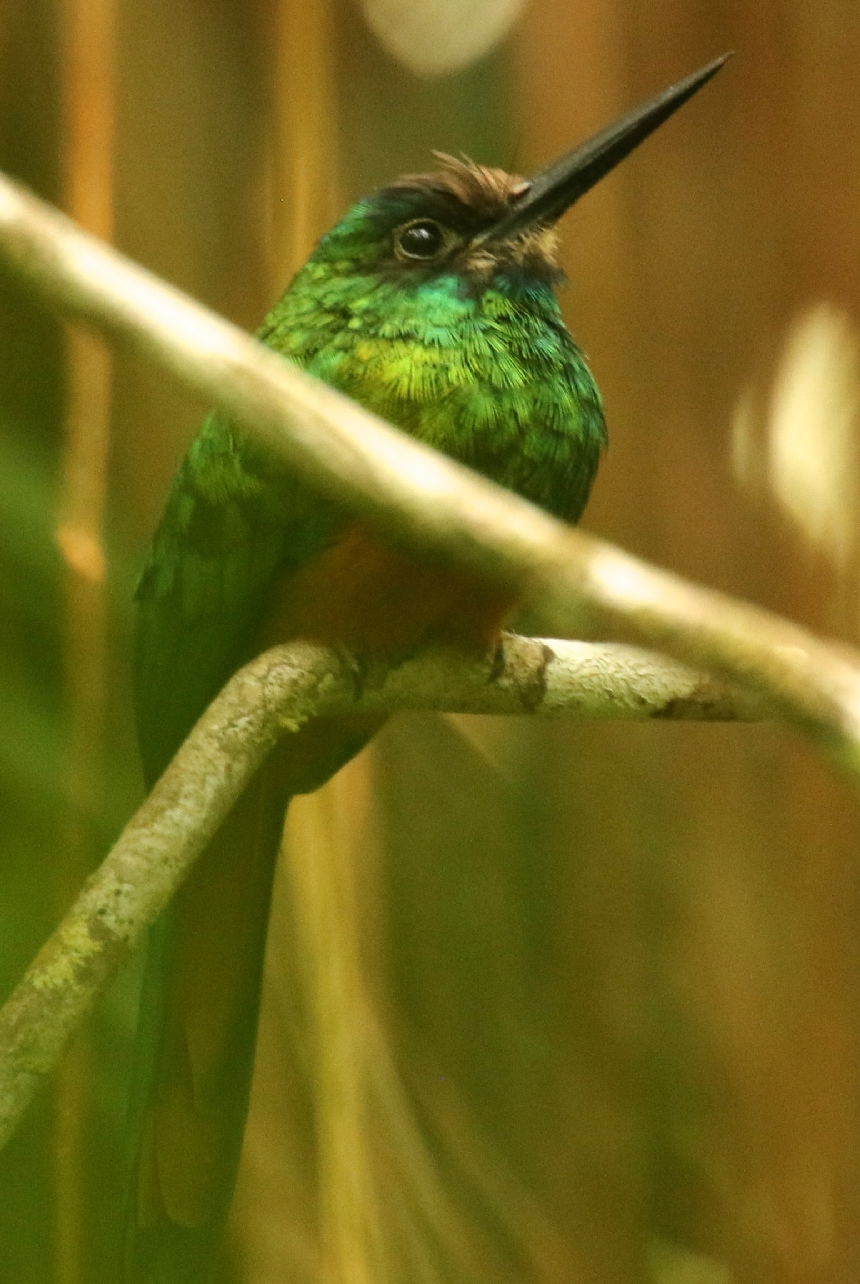
Sacha Lodge - Ecuador

== Description ==
The white-chinned jacamar is 19 to 23.5 cm (7.5 to 9.3 in) long and weighs 21.5 to 25 g (0.76 to 0.88 oz). The nominate male's crown is ash brown and the rest of the upper parts are a dark metallic bronzy green. It has a small white chin spot, a glittery green throat and chest, and a reddish chestnut belly and vent area. The female's belly is paler and ochraceous. G. t. mentalis has a larger white chin spot and the upper parts are a coppery bronze.

== Distribution and habitat ==
The nominate subspecies of white-chinned jacamar is found east of the Andes from Colombia's Meta Department southeast through Ecuador's Napo Province and Peru's Department of Loreto into western Brazil south of the Amazon River as far as the tonantins area of Amazonas state. G. t. mentalis is found further east, along both banks of the Solimões (upper Amazon) River to its confluences with the Negro and Madeira Rivers.

The white-chinned jacamar inhabits shrubby borders and openings in terra firme, várzea, and gallery forest. In lower elevations it is often found along watercourses. In elevation it ranges up to 1,200 m (3,900 ft).

== Behavior ==
=== Feeding ===
Though the white-chinned jacamar's diet is assumed to include a variety of insects, only Hymenoptera have been recorded. It perches by itself or in pairs on exposed branches from which it sallies to catch its flying prey.

=== Breeding ===
"No reliable information" is available about the white-chinned jacamar's breeding phenology.

=== Vocalization ===
The white-chinned jacamar's song is "an accelerating and rising series of "pee-pee-pee-pee-pe-pe-pe-pe'pe'pe'pe'e'e' notes" ending with a trill . Its call is "keelip" or "peeup", often given in a series .

== Status ==
The IUCN has assessed the white-chinned jacamar as being of Least Concern. Though it is widespread and occurs in several protected areas, it is rare to uncommon in most areas and "deforestation doubtless continues to reduce population size."
