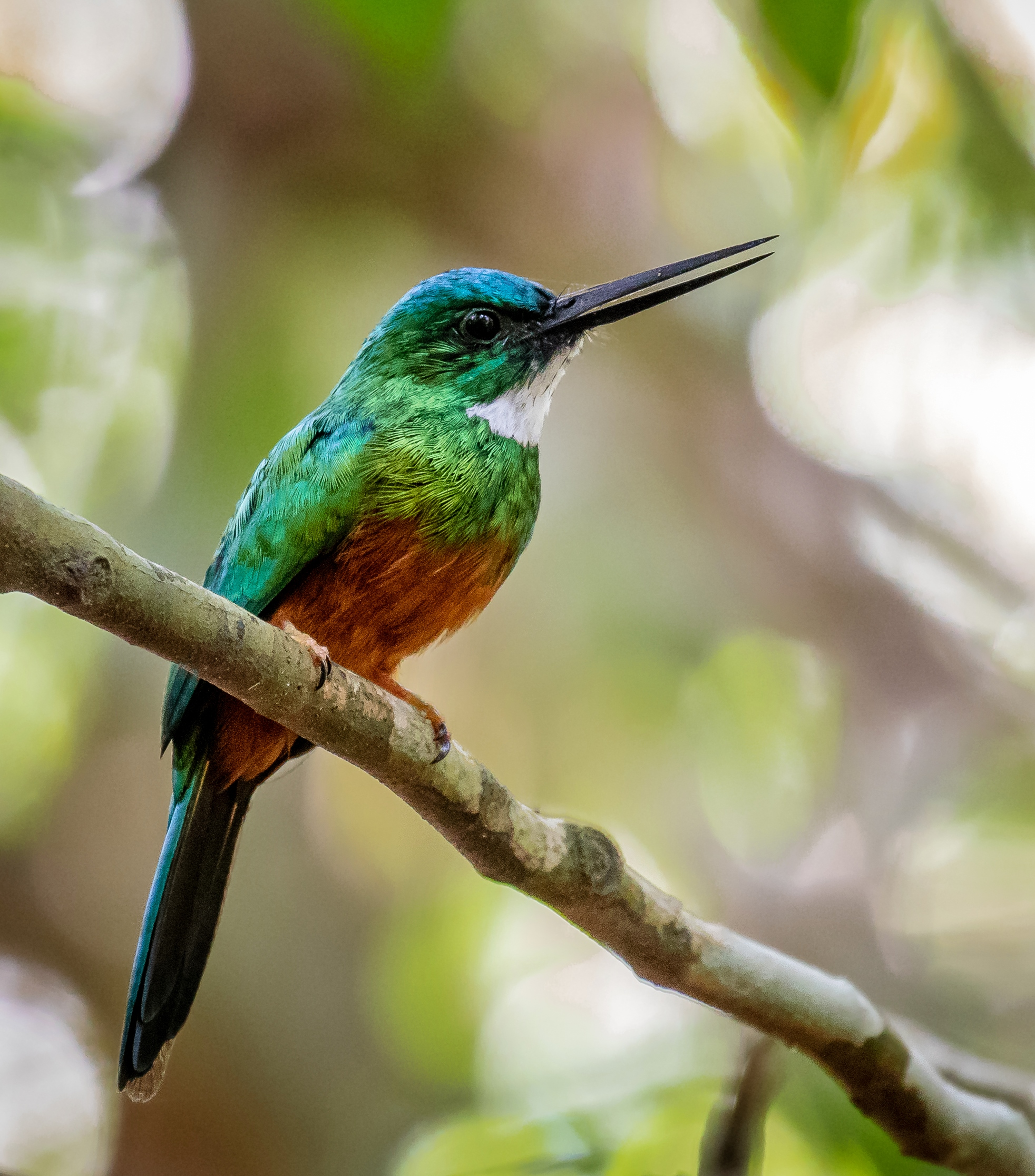
- A male green-tailed jacamar at Anavilhanas National Park, Novo Airão, Amazonas, Brazil

Conservation status
- Least Concern (IUCN 3.1)

Scientific classification
- Kingdom: Animalia
- Phylum: Chordata
- Class: Aves
- Order: Piciformes
- Family: Galbulidae
- Genus: Galbula
- Species: G. galbula

Binomial name
- Galbula galbula (Linnaeus, 1766)

Synonyms
- Alcedo galbula Linnaeus, 1766

= Green-tailed jacamar =

Species of bird

The green-tailed jacamar (Galbula galbula) is a species of bird in the family Galbulidae. It is native to Brazil, Colombia, French Guiana, Guyana, Suriname, and Venezuela.

== Taxonomy and systematics ==
The green-tailed jacamar is monotypic. It and the rufous-tailed (Galbula ruficauda), white-chinned (G. tombacea), bluish-fronted (G. cyanescens), and coppery-chested jacamars (G. pastazae) are considered to form a superspecies.

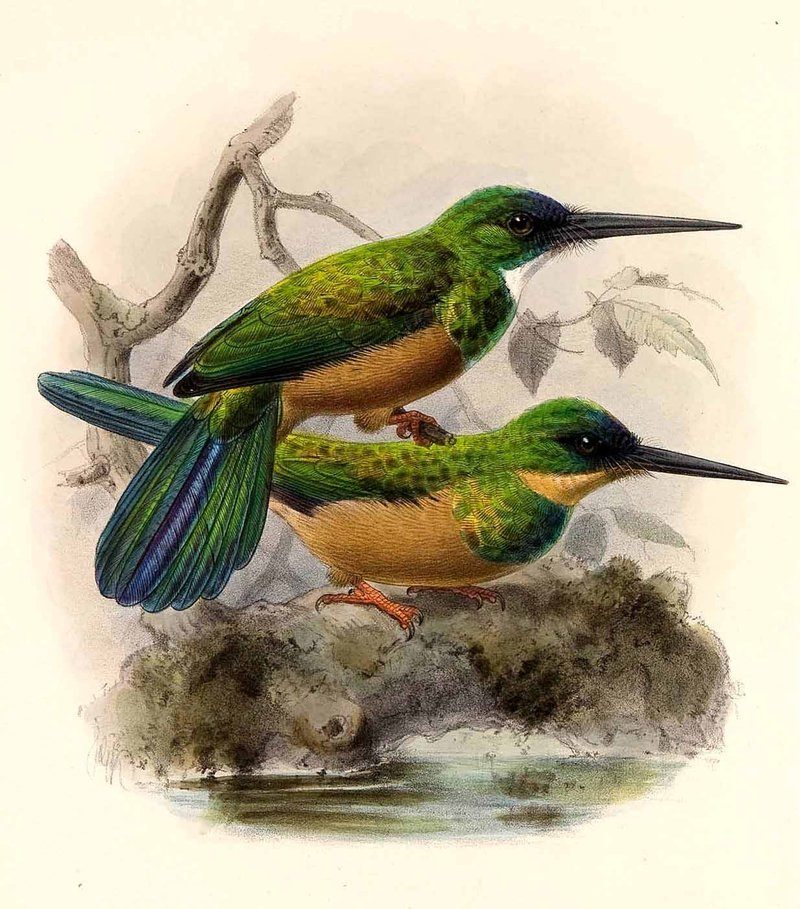
Galbula galbula, female (below) and male (above), illustration by Keulemans

== Description ==
The green-tailed jacamar is 18 to 22 cm (7.1 to 8.7 in) long and weighs 18 to 29 g (0.63 to 1.02 oz). The male's head, upperparts, and a band across the chest are metallic coppery green, somewhat bluer on the face. The tail is bluish green. The throat is white and the belly and vent area reddish chestnut. The female is similar but the throat is buff and the underparts are duller and paler.

== Distribution and habitat ==
The green-tailed jacamar is found from eastern Colombia's Vichada and Meta Departments east through southern and eastern Venezuela south of the Orinoco River to the Guianas and south in Brazil to the lower Madeira and Tapajós Rivers. It inhabits the borders, but not the interior, of several humid forest types including terra firme, várzea, gallery, and mangrove. It prefers open woodland, savanna, and shrublands, especially along watercourses. In elevation it ranges from sea level to 700 m (2,300 ft).

== Behavior ==
=== Feeding ===
The green-tailed jacamar's diet is a large variety of insects though Hymenoptera predominate. It perches on exposed branches, often in pairs, and sallies from there to catch its flying prey.

=== Breeding ===
The green-tailed jacamar excavates burrows in earth banks or arboreal termite nests. It has been documented breeding February to March in Venezuela, in May, June, and August in Suriname, and in April and September in Brazil.

=== Vocalization ===
The green-tailed jacamar's song is an "accelerating 'peeo peeo peea pee-pee-pee-pee-pe-pe-pe-e-e-e-e'e'e'e' that ends in a trill . Its call is a repeated "peep" or "peer", sometimes in a series .

== Status ==
The IUCN has assessed the green-tailed jacamar as being of Least Concern. It appears to be common in most of its range and occurs in several protected areas.
