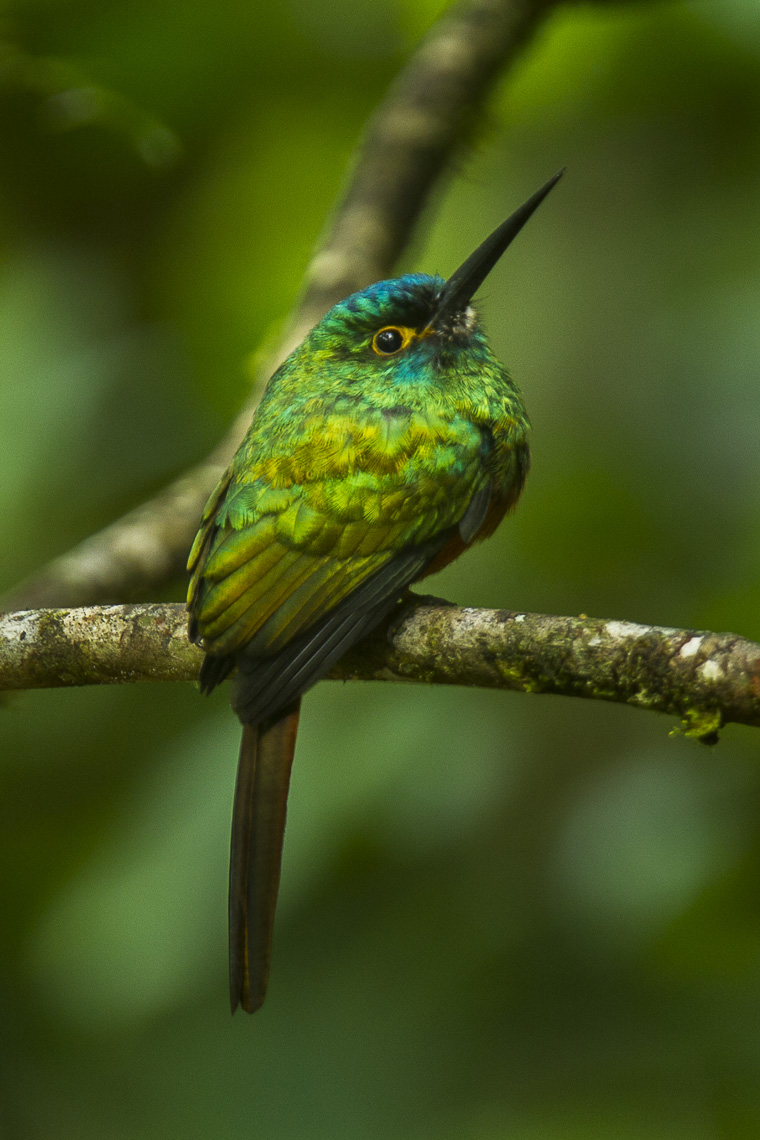
- Image from Ecuador

Conservation status
- Least Concern (IUCN 3.1)

Scientific classification
- Kingdom: Animalia
- Phylum: Chordata
- Class: Aves
- Order: Piciformes
- Family: Galbulidae
- Genus: Galbula
- Species: G. pastazae

Binomial name
- Galbula pastazae Taczanowski & Berlepsch, 1885

Audio
- Recording from Ecuador

= Coppery-chested jacamar =

Species of bird

The coppery-chested jacamar (Galbula pastazae) is a species of bird in the family Galbulidae. It is found in Colombia, Ecuador and Peru.

== Taxonomy and systematics ==
The coppery-chested jacamar is monotypic. It and the rufous-tailed (Galbula ruficauda), white-chinned (G. tombacea), bluish-fronted (G. cyanescens), and green-tailed jacamars (G. glabula) are considered to form a superspecies.

== Description ==
The coppery-chested jacamar is 23 to 24 cm (9.1 to 9.4 in) long and weighs approximately 31 to 32 g (1.1 to 1.1 oz). The male's crown is metallic green with a blue gloss. The rest of the upper parts are metallic bronzy green. The throat and breast are shiny green and the belly and vent area are dark rufous. The female is similar except that the chin and throat are dark rufous.

== Distribution and habitat ==
The coppery-chested jacamar is effectively endemic to Ecuador, though there are records from a single site in each of far southern Colombia and far northern Peru. It is found on the east slope of the Andes between approximately 750 to 1,500 m (2,460 to 4,920 ft) in Ecuador. The Colombia record, at El Carmen, Nariño Department, was at 1,600 m (5,200 ft) and the Peru record, on the upper Comaina River, Amazonas Department, was at 1,430 m (4,690 ft). The coppery-chested jacamar inhabits humid montane forest. It is a bird of the understory, being found along forest edges, along watercourses, and at tree falls and landslides that provide openings.

== Behavior ==
=== Feeding ===
The coppery-chested jacamar is insectivorous but few details of its diet or feeding methods are known.

=== Breeding ===
One known nest of the coppery-chested jacamar was a burrow in an earth bank. Little else has been documented about its breeding.

=== Vocalization ===
The coppery-chested jacamar's song is "a rising series of wee notes, sometimes ending in a descending rattle" . Its call is "a weet note, singly or in a series" .

== Status ==
The IUCN has assessed the coppery-chested jacamar as least concern. It is uncommon and its population is believed to be decreasing in parallel with forest destruction.
