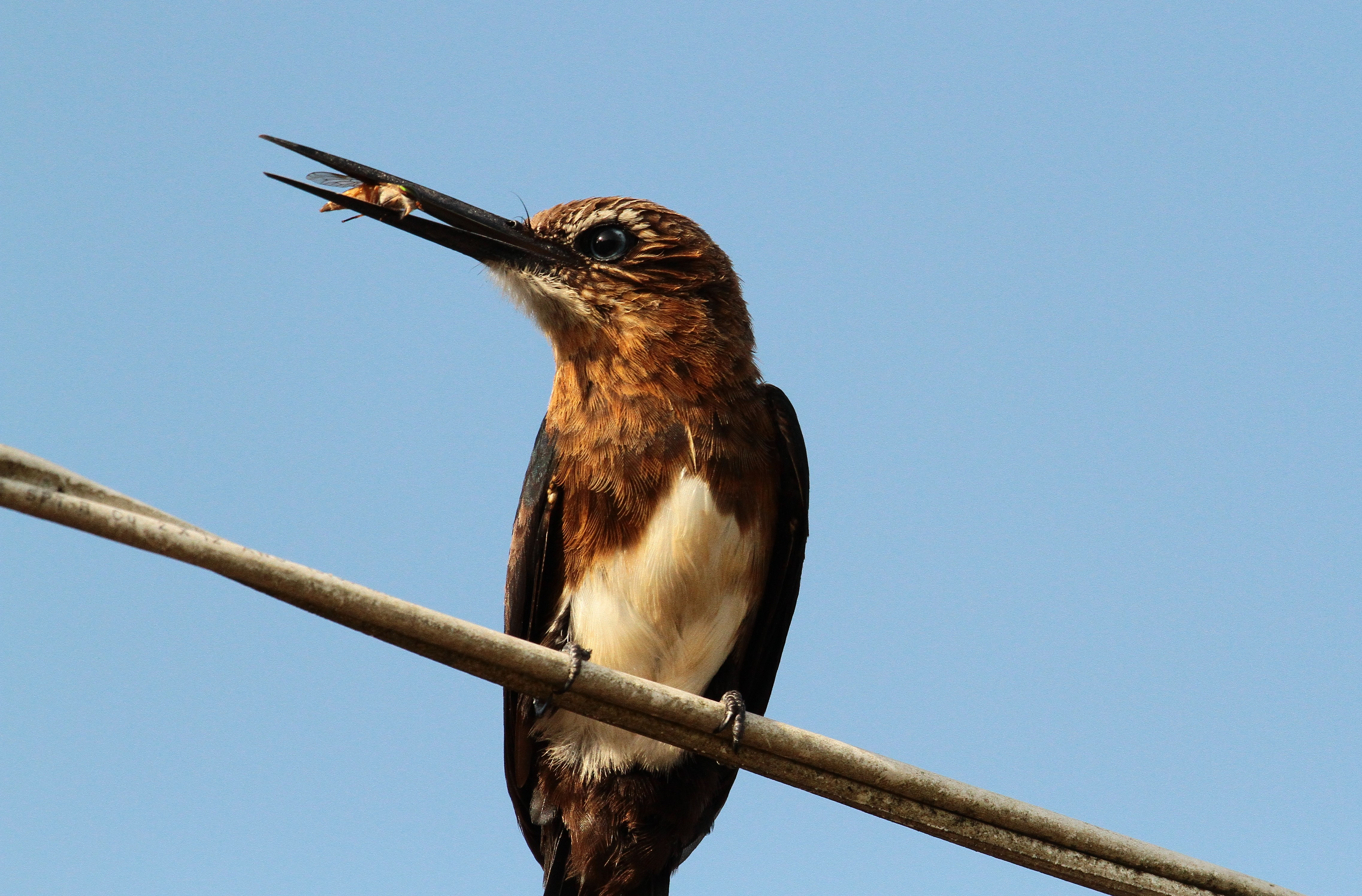

Conservation status
- Least Concern (IUCN 3.1)

Scientific classification
- Kingdom: Animalia
- Phylum: Chordata
- Class: Aves
- Order: Piciformes
- Family: Galbulidae
- Genus: Brachygalba
- Species: B. lugubris

Binomial name
- Brachygalba lugubris (Swainson, 1838)

= Brown jacamar =

Species of bird

The brown jacamar (Brachygalba lugubris) is a species of bird in the family Galbulidae. It is found in Bolivia, Brazil, Colombia, Ecuador, French Guiana, Guyana, Peru, Suriname, and Venezuela.

== Taxonomy and systematics ==
The brown jacamar and the dusky-backed (B. salmoni), pale-headed (B. goeringi), and white-throated jacamars (B. albogularis) form a superspecies. The brown jacamar has seven subspecies:

- B. l. fulviventris Sclater (1891)
- B. l. caquetae Chapman (1917)
- B. l. lugubris Swainson (1838)
- B. l. obscuriceps Zimmer & Phelps (1947)
- B. l. naumburgae Chapman (1931)
- B. l. phaeonota Todd (1943)
- B. l. melanosterna Sclater (1855)

Three of them (fulviventris, phaeonota, and melanosterna) were at one time treated as separate species.

== Description ==
The brown jacamar is 14 to 18 cm (5.5 to 7.1 in) long and weighs 16 to 23 g (0.56 to 0.81 oz). The upper parts of the nominate are brown and the lower back dark brown with a greenish black gloss. The wings are blackish with a blue sheen. The chin and throat are off-white, the breast and flanks reddish brown, and the lower breast and belly off-white or buff. The other subspecies differ in the tone and intensity of the back and breast colors.

== Distribution and habitat ==
The brown jacamar is found in three unconnected areas in northern South America east of the Andes. The details are:

- B. l. fulviventris, central Colombia's Meta and Boyacá Departments
- B. l. caquetae, from Colombia's Caquetá Department south to eastern Ecuador and northern Peru
- B. l. lugubris, eastern and southern Venezuela east through the Guianas and northern Brazil
- B. l. obscuriceps, southern Venezuela and adjoining northwestern Brazil
- B. l. naumburgae, northeastern Brazil's Maranhão and Piauí states
- B. l. phaeonota, Brazil, along Rio Solimões (upper Amazon River) in western Amazonas state
- B. l. melanosterna, Bolivia's Santa Cruz Department and central and southern Brazil

The brown jacamar primarily inhabits terra firme, várzea, and gallery forests, both primary and secondary. There it is found in the canopy, along edges, and in shrubby clearings. It is also found along watercourses in savanna and, in some parts of its range, on white sand soils. In elevation it usually ranges from lowlands to 900 m (3,000 ft) but has been found as high as 1,500 m (4,900 ft) in Venezuela.

== Behavior ==
=== Feeding ===
The brown jacamar's diet is insects of many kinds. It perches on exposed branches in pairs or small groups and sallies from there to catch its flying prey.

=== Breeding ===
The brown jacamar's nest has not been documented, but it is assumed to be a burrow in a soil bank or an arboreal termite nest. In Colombia, a family with three young was noted in March and other individuals in breeding condition in May.

=== Vocalization ===
The brown jacamar's song is a "descending 'tick tick tick ti ti ti ti tit t t t' or 'plee, plee, plee-plee-plee'ple'pe'pe'e'e'e" ending in a stutter . Its calls are a sharp "hilew" or lower "chewee" .

== Status ==
The IUCN has assessed the brown jacamar as being of Least Concern. It is uncommon to common in various parts of its range, occurs in several protected areas, and "its habitat requirements suggest that selective logging would not be a threat." However, subspecies B. l. phaeonota is known only in a very small area, and so "requires further study to clarify its conservation status and range."
