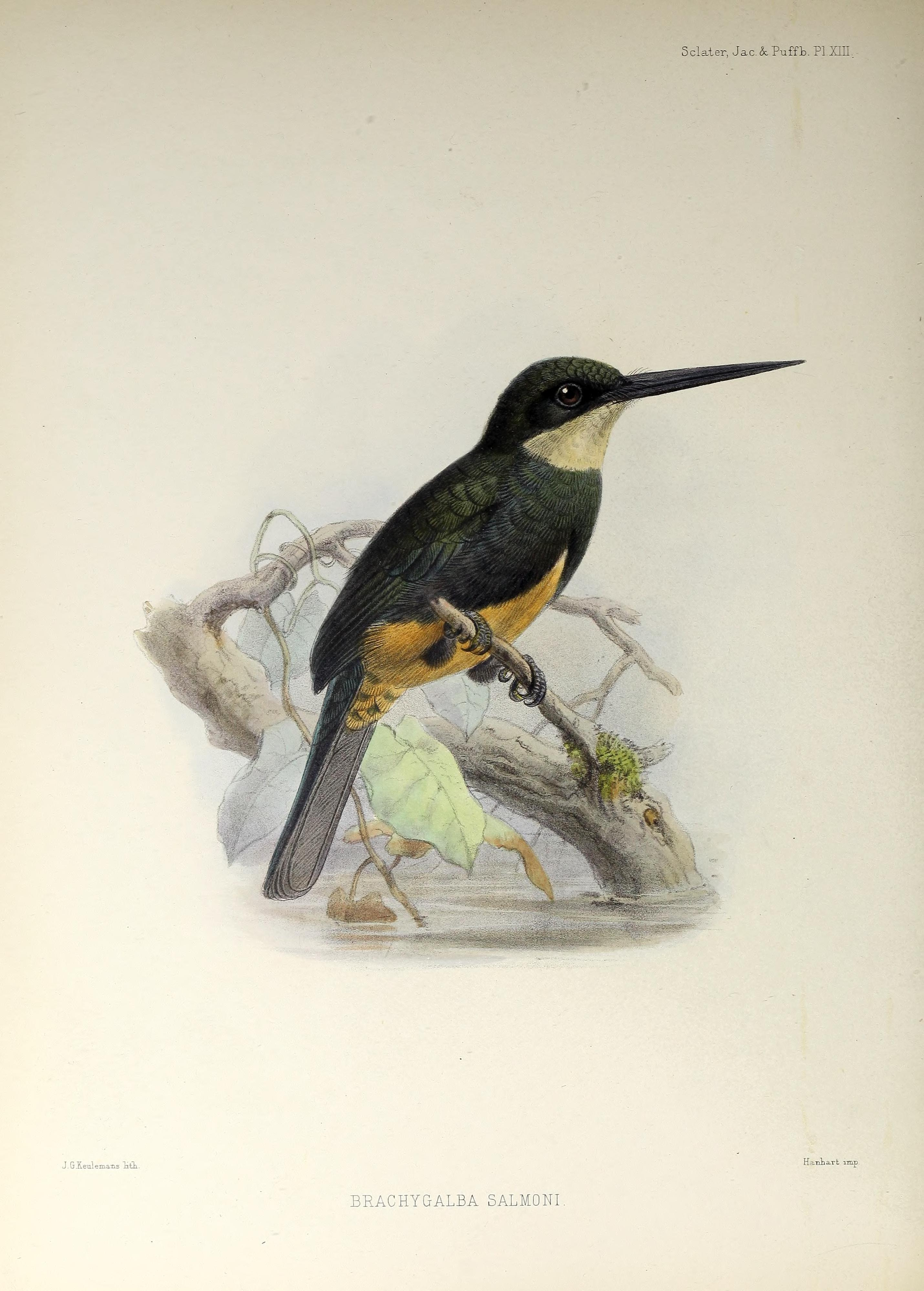

Conservation status
- Least Concern (IUCN 3.1)

Scientific classification
- Kingdom: Animalia
- Phylum: Chordata
- Class: Aves
- Order: Piciformes
- Family: Galbulidae
- Genus: Brachygalba
- Species: B. salmoni

Binomial name
- Brachygalba salmoni Sclater, PL & Salvin, 1879

= Dusky-backed jacamar =

Species of bird

The dusky-backed jacamar (Brachygalba salmoni) is a species of bird in the family Galbulidae. It is found in Colombia and Panama.

== Taxonomy and systematics ==
The dusky-backed jacamar is monotypic. It and the pale-headed (B. goeringi), brown (B. lugubris), and white-throated jacamars (B. albogularis) form a superspecies.

== Description ==
The dusky-backed jacamar is 16.5 to 18 cm (6.5 to 7.1 in) long. Males weigh 18.5 g (0.65 oz) and females 16 g (0.56 oz). The male's upper parts, chest, and flanks are dark greenish black that appears bluish when worn. Its cheeks are sooty, the throat white or whitish, and the belly and breast cinnamon. The female is similar but its throat is buff.

== Distribution and habitat ==
The dusky-backed jacamar is found in Panama's Darién Province and the adjoining and nearby northern Chocó, northern Antioquia, and southern Córdoba Departments of Colombia. There is also an isolated population in northern Bolívar Department, Colombia, that at one time was thought to be a subspecies. It inhabits humid primary and secondary forest. It is found in edges, such as by clearings and along streams, rather than the forest interior. In elevation it ranges up to 700 m (2,300 ft).

== Behavior ==
=== Feeding ===
The dusky-backed jacamar preys on a variety of flying insects that it catches by flying from a perch. It often perches and hunts in pairs or small family groups.

=== Breeding ===
Though the dusky-backed jacamar is assumed to nest in burrows in earth banks, there is no documentation of its breeding phenology. Birds in breeding condition were noted during January and February in Colombia.

=== Vocalization ===
The dusky-backed jacamar has a complex song . Its call is described as an "upwardly inflected 'sweet' or 'feet'...sometimes expanded to...a longer series" .

== Status ==
The IUCN has assessed the dusky-backed jacamar as being of Least Concern. It is scarce overall but locally common in its small range, though it "[t]olerates, or perhaps even prefers, a degree of habitat disturbance". The isolated Bolívar population might be vulnerable to habitat destruction.
