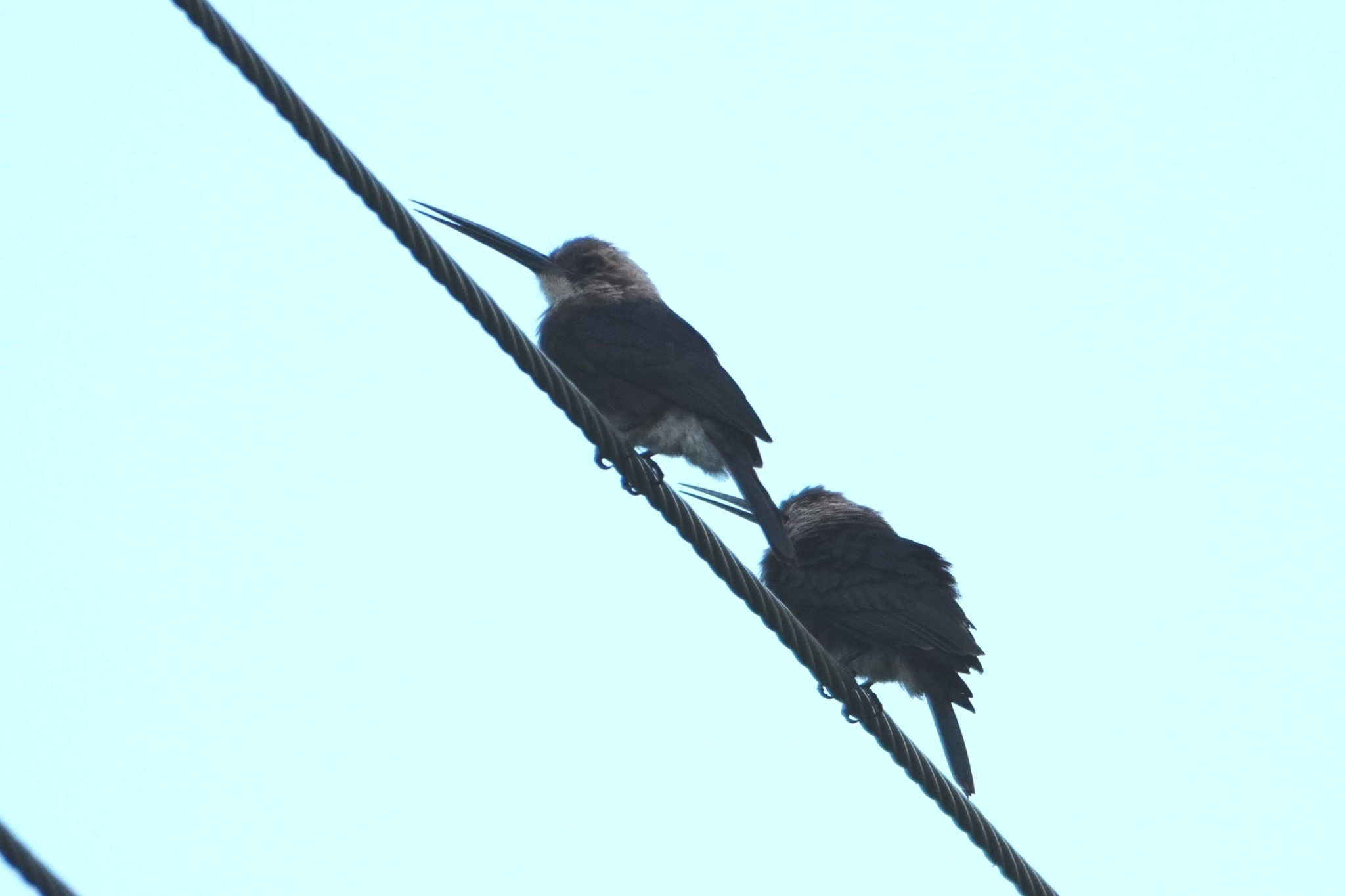

Conservation status
- Least Concern (IUCN 3.1)

Scientific classification
- Kingdom: Animalia
- Phylum: Chordata
- Class: Aves
- Order: Piciformes
- Family: Galbulidae
- Genus: Brachygalba
- Species: B. goeringi

Binomial name
- Brachygalba goeringi Sclater, PL & Salvin, 1869

= Pale-headed jacamar =

Species of bird

The pale-headed jacamar (Brachygalba goeringi) is a species of bird in the family Galbulidae. It is found in Colombia and Venezuela.

== Taxonomy and systematics ==
The pale-headed jacamar is monotypic. It and the dusky-backed (B. salmoni), brown (B. lugubris), and white-throated jacamars (B. albogularis) form a superspecies.

== Description ==
The pale-headed jacamar is 16.5 to 18 cm (6.5 to 7.1 in) long and weighs 16 to 18 g (0.56 to 0.63 oz). The male's crown, nape, and shoulders are ashy brown. The rest of the upper parts are dark brown glossed with greenish; they look blue-black when worn. It has a pale supercilium and a buffy-white throat. It has a chestnut band on the upper belly and dark brown flanks; the rest of the underparts are white. The female is almost identical. The juvenile has a gray crown and nape, and the upper parts are brighter and the green gloss stronger.

== Distribution and habitat ==
The pale-headed jacamar is found from Arauca and Casanare Departments in Colombia north through northwestern Venezuela at least to Lara. It primarily inhabits the edges of gallery and secondary forest in llanos grasslands. In elevation it ranges as high as 1,100 m (3,600 ft) but is usually found much lower.

== Behavior ==
=== Feeding ===
The pale-headed jacamar's diet is insects, mostly Lepidoptera and Odonata. It often perches on emergent branches in pairs or small family groups and sallies from there to catch its flying prey.

=== Breeding ===
The pale-headed jacamar nests in burrows in earth banks. Nesting has been noted in Venezuela during April and May.

=== Vocalization ===
The pale-headed jacamar's song is a series of high "weet" notes that increase in speed and pitch and ends with a trill .

== Status ==
The IUCN has assessed the pale-headed jacamar as being of Least Concern. It is "[c]ommon throughout its range..." and "[n]o specific threats [are] documented so far, despite overall habitat loss in certain areas as a result of deforestation.
