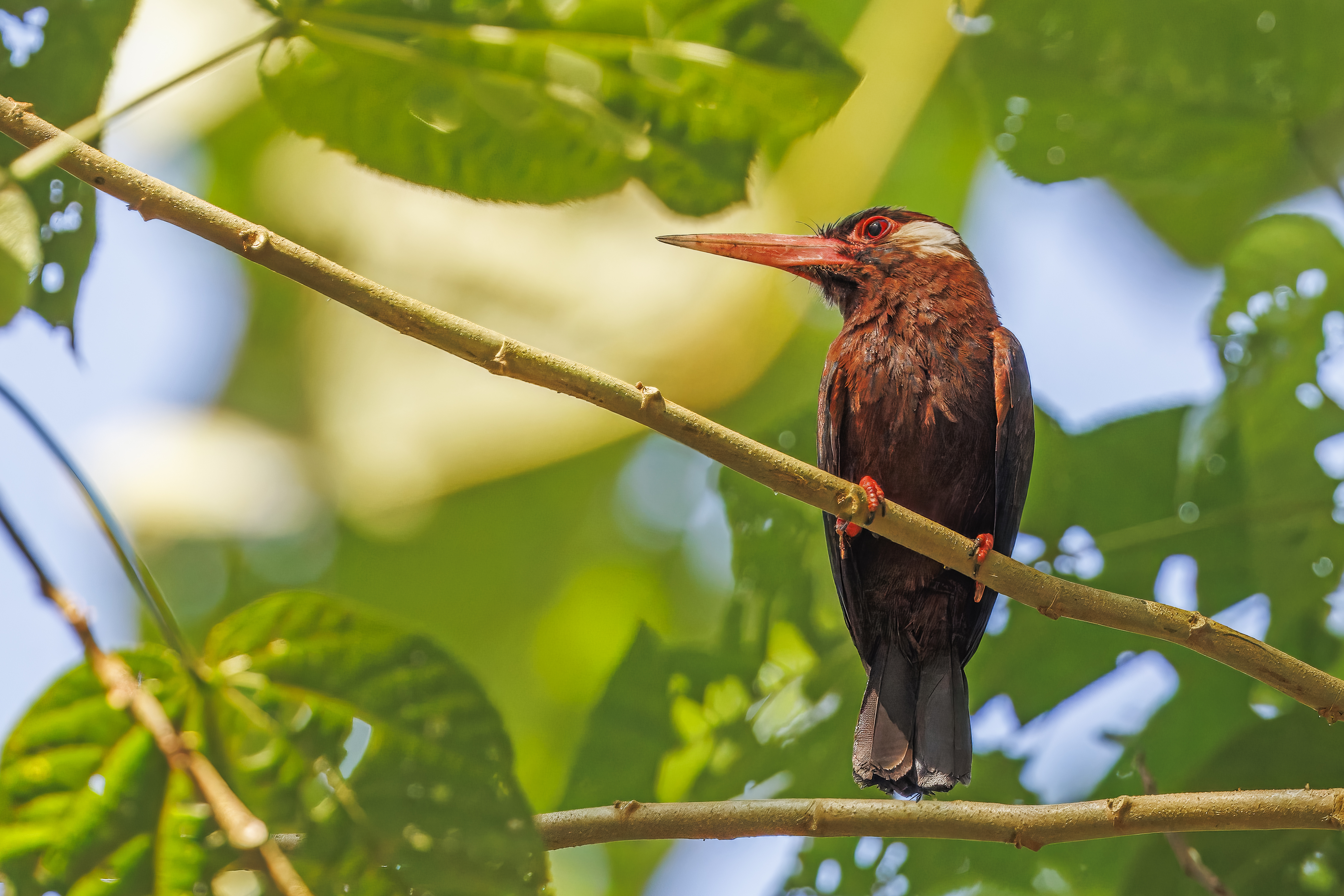
- In Ecuador

Conservation status
- Least Concern (IUCN 3.1)

Scientific classification
- Kingdom: Animalia
- Phylum: Chordata
- Class: Aves
- Order: Piciformes
- Family: Galbulidae
- Genus: Galbalcyrhynchus
- Species: G. leucotis

Binomial name
- Galbalcyrhynchus leucotis Des Murs, 1845

= White-eared jacamar =

Species of bird

The white-eared jacamar (Galbalcyrhynchus leucotis) is a species of bird in the family Galbulidae. It is found in Brazil, Colombia, Ecuador and Peru.

== Taxonomy and systematics ==
The white-eared jacamar shares genus Galbalcyrhynchus with the purus jacamar (G. purusianus). They were originally treated a separate species, then as conspecific ("chestnut jacamar"), but are now understood to be separate species. The white-eared jacamar is monotypic.

== Description ==
The white-eared jacamar is 18 to 21 cm (7.1 to 8.3 in) long and weighs 44 to 50 g (1.6 to 1.8 oz). It is stouter than many jacamars, and has a more robust bill. It is almost entirely reddish-chestnut, with a bronzy gloss on the crown, wings, and tail. It has large white ear coverts. The juvenile is paler and its bill is shorter.

== Distribution and habitat ==
The white-eared jacamar is found in the upper Amazon basin from Meta Department in central Colombia south through eastern Ecuador to the Ucayali River in northeastern Peru. It extends east into western Brazil along the Solimões (Upper Amazon) River almost to Manaus. In this humid region, it inhabits terra firme and várzea forest, both primary and secondary. It prefers edges such as around clearings and along waterways. In elevation it ranges up to 500 m (1,600 ft).

== Behavior ==
=== Feeding ===
The white-eared jacamar preys on insects, with Hymenoptera and Lepidoptera favored. It perches at mid- to upper canopy height singly or in small groups and sallies out to capture its prey.

=== Breeding ===
White-eared jacamar nest cavities in Ecuador and Peru were in termite nests high in trees. The Ecuador nest was active in April and that in Peru in July. Breeding condition birds were recorded in June in Colombia.

=== Vocalization ===
The white-eared jacamar's song has been described as a "rising and accelerating...trill, "trrreeeeeeerrrr-reeeerrr-reeerr-reerreerr..." . It also makes a loud "kyew" or "cue" call .

== Status ==
The IUCN has assessed the white-eared jacamar as being of Least Concern. It is generally common in its large range and occurs in several protected areas. With ongoing deforestation in Amazonia, its "preference for successional and edge habitats suggests good survival prospects."
