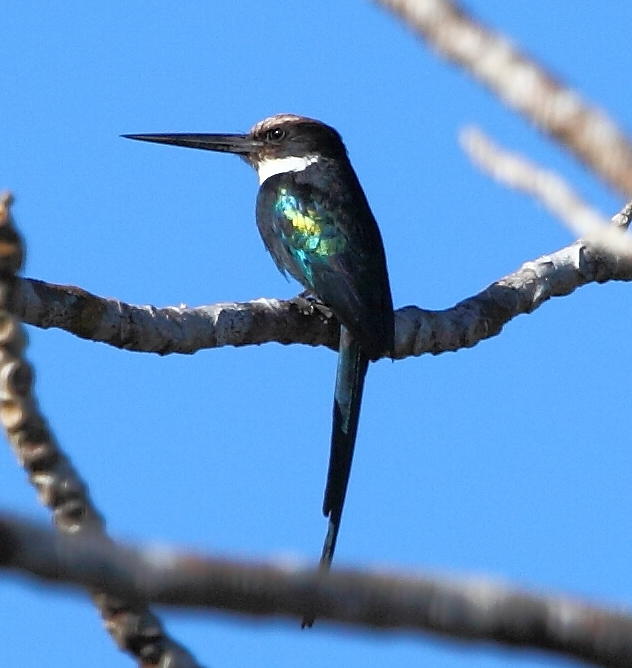
- At Novo Mundo, Mato Grosso State, Brazil

Conservation status
- Least Concern (IUCN 3.1)

Scientific classification
- Kingdom: Animalia
- Phylum: Chordata
- Class: Aves
- Order: Piciformes
- Family: Galbulidae
- Genus: Galbula
- Species: G. dea

Binomial name
- Galbula dea (Linnaeus, 1758)

Synonyms
- Alcedo dea Linnaeus, 1758

= Paradise jacamar =

Species of bird

The paradise jacamar (Galbula dea) is a species of bird in the family Galbulidae. It is found in Bolivia, Brazil, Ecuador, French Guiana, Guyana, Peru, Suriname, and Venezuela.

== Taxonomy ==
The paradise jacamar was formally described in 1758 by the Swedish naturalist Carl Linnaeus in the tenth edition of his Systema Naturae. He placed it with the kingfishers in the genus Alcedo and coined the binomial name Alcedo dea. Linnaeus based his entry on the "swallow-tail'd king-fisher" that had been described and illustrated in 1743 by the English naturalist George Edwards in his multivolume A Natural History of Uncommon Bird. Edwards had examined a specimen that had been collected in the Dutch colony of Surinam. The paradise jacamar is now one of ten species placed in the genus Galbula that was introduced in 1760 by the French zoologist Mathurin Jacques Brisson. The genus name Galbula is from the Latin galuba, a word for a small yellow bird. The specific epithet dea is Latin meaning "goddess".

Four subspecies are recognised:

- G. d. dea (Linnaeus, 1758) – Venezuela, the Guianas and Brazil (north of the Amazon)
- G. d. amazonum (Sclater, PL, 1855) – north Bolivia and southwest Brazil
- G. d. brunneiceps (Todd, 1943) – east Colombia, east Peru and west Brazil
- G. d. phainopepla (Todd, 1943) – central west Brazil

Early in the 20th century the paradise jacamar was placed in the monotypic genus Urogalba, but it has been in Galbula since the middle of the century. It is possible that the subspecies are actually clinal variations.

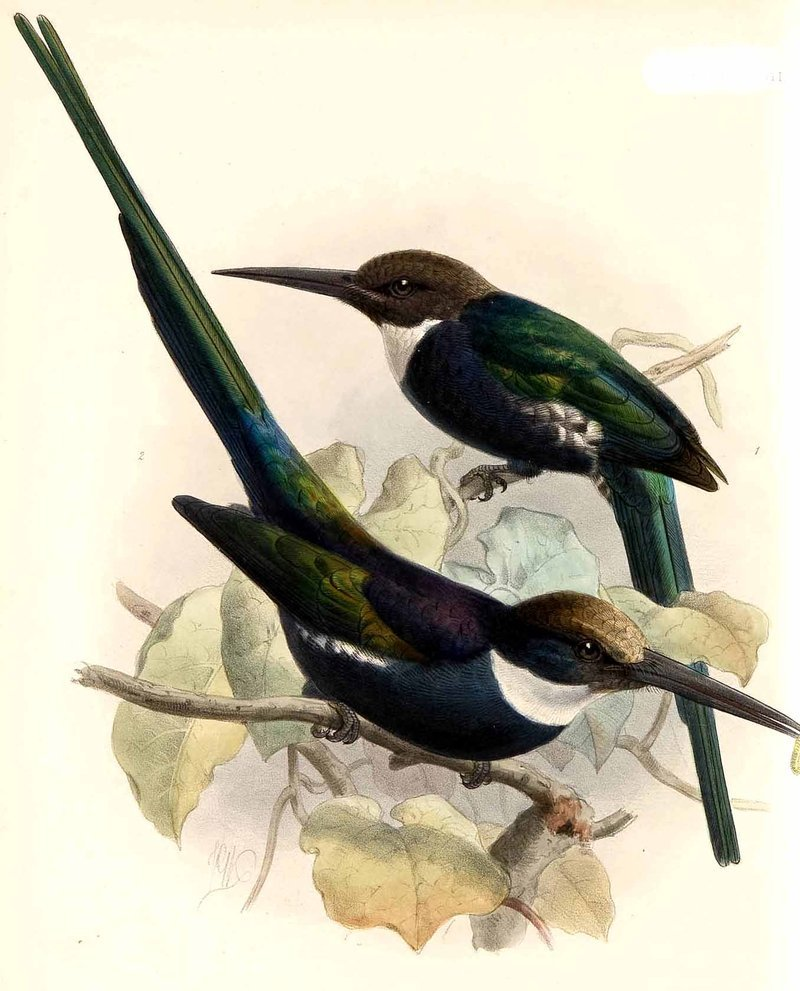
Illustration by Keulemans

== Description ==
The paradise jacamar is 25.5 to 34 cm (10.0 to 13.4 in) long and weighs 25 to 32.5 g (0.88 to 1.15 oz). Both sexes of the nominate have a dark brown crown and are glossy black on the rest of the upper parts. They have a white throat and upper breast; the rest of the underparts are blackish. The other subspecies differ in a few ways. G. d. amazonum's crown is lighter and the white throat more extensive, and G. d. phainopepla is similar to it. G. d. brunneiceps's crown is lighter and its upper parts have a bronzy greenish sheen.

== Distribution and habitat ==
The paradise jacamar is found throughout most of the Amazon Basin. The subspecies are distributed thus:

- G. d. dea: from the upper Orinoco River in southern Venezuela east through the Guianas and in Brazil north of the Amazon River.
- G. d. amazonum: north central Brazil south to northern Mato Grosso state and northern Bolivia.
- G. d. brunneiceps: southeastern Colombia, eastern Ecuador and Peru, and western Brazil south of the Amazon and west of the Negro River.
- G. d. phainopepla: western Brazil south of the Amazon and west of the Madeira River.

The paradise jacamar mostly inhabits terra firme, várzea, and savanna forests, both primary and secondary. It is also found in dry forest and gallery forest. It is most often found along edges or in open areas such as clearings and treefalls, and rarely in the forest interior. Unusually for a jacamar, it is mostly seen in the canopy rather than the mid level. It is most often found below 500 m (1,600 ft) of elevation but locally occurs up to 1,100 m (3,600 ft).

== Behavior ==
=== Feeding ===
The paradise jacamar's diet is primarily Lepidoptera, Odonata, Diptera, and Hymenoptera, but it also takes other flying insects. It perches on exposed branches by itself, in pairs, or in small groups and sallies out to catch its prey. It sometimes joins mixed-species foraging flocks in the canopy.

=== Breeding ===
A pair of paradise jacamars was seen excavating a burrow in an arboreal termite nest, and pairs have often been seen near such nests. No other information about the species' breeding phenology has been recorded.

=== Vocalization ===
The paradise jacamar's song is "a well-spaced "peep peep peep peep peep peep pee pee pe pe", usually descending, becoming slightly faster and weaker towards [the] end" . Its calls are variously "a single 'pip', 'peeap' or 'glewweh'" .

== Status ==
The IUCN has assessed the paradise jacamar as being of Least Concern. It varies from rare to common throughout its range and has been recorded in many protected areas. "No immediate threats are known, but general habitat destruction presumably continues to reduce populations."
