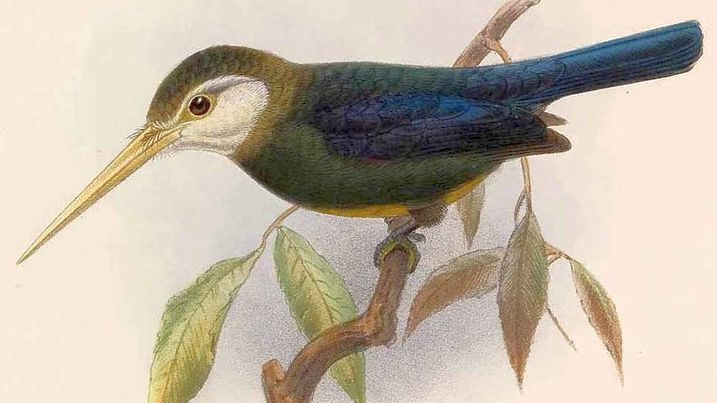

Conservation status
- Least Concern (IUCN 3.1)

Scientific classification
- Kingdom: Animalia
- Phylum: Chordata
- Class: Aves
- Order: Piciformes
- Family: Galbulidae
- Genus: Brachygalba
- Species: B. albogularis

Binomial name
- Brachygalba albogularis (Spix, 1824)

= White-throated jacamar =

Species of bird

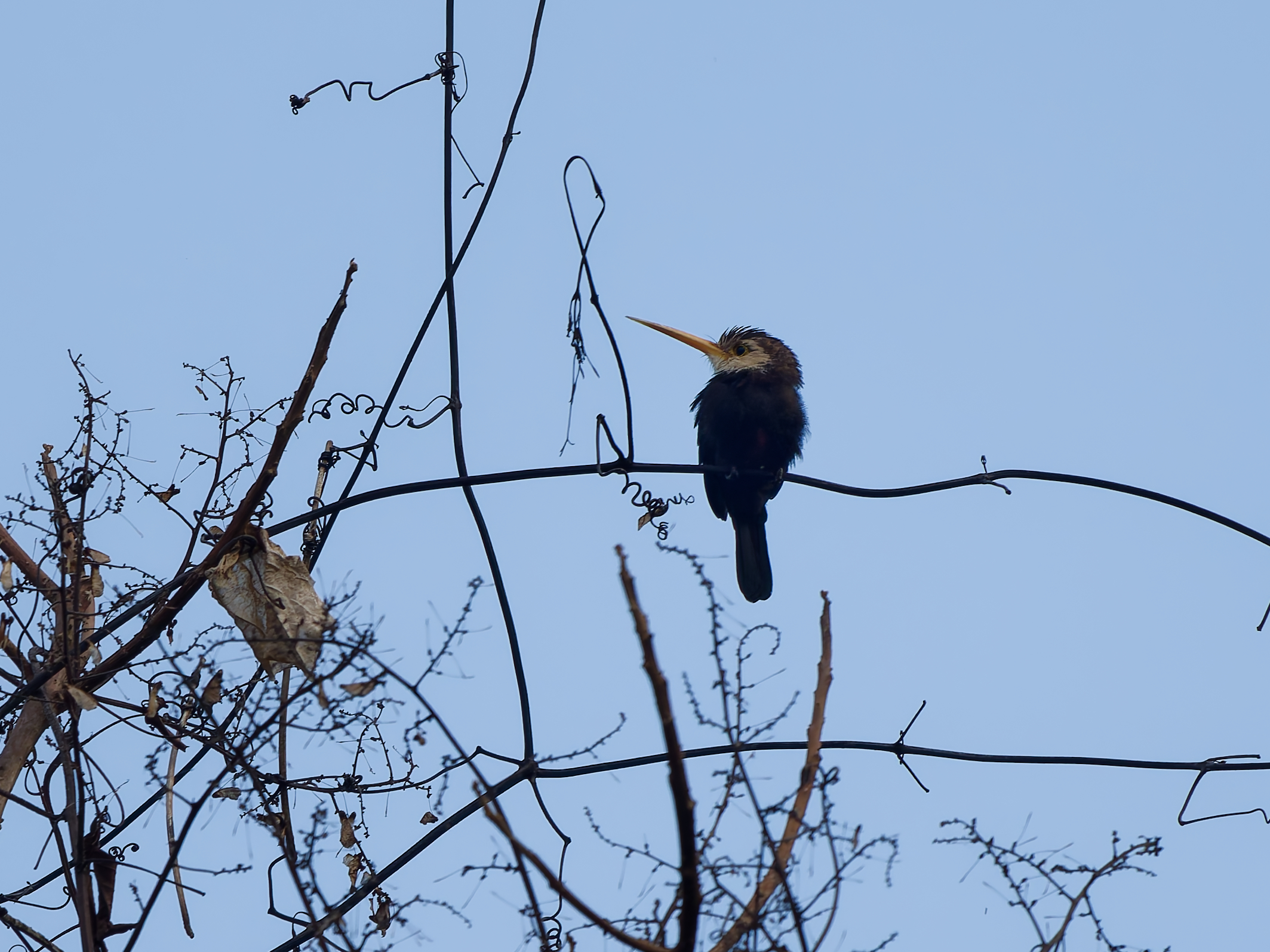
White-throated Jacamar

The white-throated jacamar (Brachygalba albogularis) is a species of bird in the family Galbulidae. It is found in Bolivia, Brazil and Peru.

== Taxonomy and systematics ==
The white-throated jacamar is monotypic. It and the dusky-backed (B. salmoni), pale-headed (B. goeringi), and brown jacamars (B. lugubris) form a superspecies.

== Description ==
The white-throated jacamar is 15 to 16 cm (5.9 to 6.3 in) long. The male is distinguished by its white face and throat; its upper parts are dark brown to black with a greenish blue gloss. The belly is also dark brown to black with a chestnut patch in its center. The female is similar, though its chestnut patch may be larger.

== Distribution and habitat ==
The white-throated jacamar is found in a small area of the upper Amazon Basin where eastern Peru, western Brazil, and northern Bolivia abut. It inhabits the edges of primary várzea forest or young growth along whitewater rivers. Examples of the latter include river islands and Gynerium cane and bamboo stands. It is mostly found from mid level up to the canopy. In elevation it has been recorded up to 600 m (2,000 ft) in Peru.

== Behavior ==
=== Feeding ===
The white-throated jacamar's diet is poorly known, but Hymenoptera and Lepidoptera have been identified. It perches in small groups on exposed branches in the canopy and sallies from there to catch its flying prey.

=== Breeding ===
One detailed study of the white-throated jacamar's breeding phenology was in Peru's Manu National Park. Nests were found in August and September; they were partially hidden burrows in vertical stream banks. Up to four adults provisioned the young.

=== Vocalization ===
The white-throated jacamar's song is " a high, thin series of whistles...'pee-pipi-peeee tewee tewee tewee'" . Its call is "a plaintive upslurred 'psueet' or 'kuweei'" .

== Status ==
The IUCN has assessed the white-throated jacamar as being of Least Concern. "No immediate threats are recorded, although it is probably sensitive to destruction of riverine habitat."
