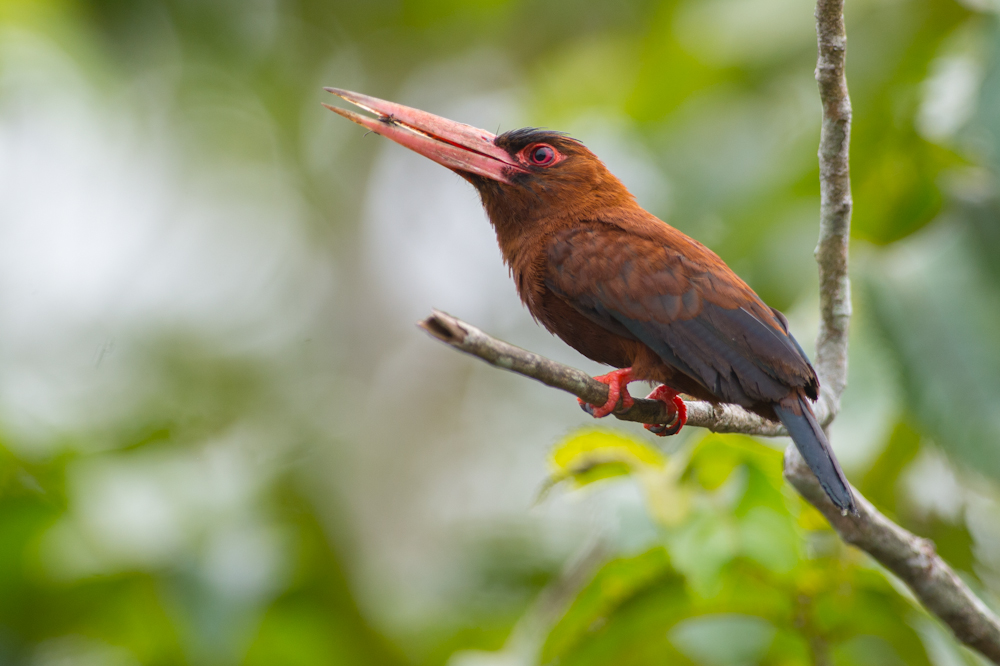

Conservation status
- Least Concern (IUCN 3.1)

Scientific classification
- Kingdom: Animalia
- Phylum: Chordata
- Class: Aves
- Order: Piciformes
- Family: Galbulidae
- Genus: Galbalcyrhynchus
- Species: G. purusianus

Binomial name
- Galbalcyrhynchus purusianus Goeldi, 1904

= Purus jacamar =

Species of bird

The Purus jacamar (Galbalcyrhynchus purusianus) is a species of bird in the family Galbulidae. It is found in Bolivia, Brazil, and Peru.

== Taxonomy and systematics ==
The Purus jacamar shares genus Galbalcyrhynchus with the white-eared jacamar (G. leucotis). They were originally treated a separate species, then as conspecific ("chestnut jacamar"), but are now understood to be separate species. The Purus jacamar is monotypic.

== Description ==
The Purus jacamar is 20 cm (7.9 in) long and weighs 50 g (1.8 oz). It is stouter than many jacamars, and has a more robust bill. It is almost entirely chestnut, with dark bronzy forehead, crown, wings, and tail. The juvenile is paler and its bill is shorter.

== Distribution and habitat ==
The Purus jacamar is found in the upper Amazon Basin of eastern Peru, western Brazil, and northern Bolivia. In this humid region, it inhabits terra firme and várzea forest, both primary and secondary. It prefers edges such as along waterways and oxbow lakes.

== Behavior ==
=== Feeding ===
The Purus jacamar preys on insects, with Hymenoptera (bees and wasps) and Isoptera (termites) favored. It perches at mid- to upper canopy height singly or in small groups and sallies out to capture its prey.

=== Breeding ===
The Purus jacamar has been documented excavating cavities in termite nests high in trees in Brazil and Peru. It is apparently a cooperative breeder, as the Peru cavity was excavated by six individuals and groups of up to six individuals have been noted singing together.

=== Vocalization ===
The Purus jacamar's vocalizations are essentially identical to those of white-eared jacamar. The song is a rising trill and the calls "a series of loud 'peeeur' whistles and a sharp 'pee'" .

== Status ==
The IUCN has assessed the Purus jacamar as being of Least Concern. It ranges from scarce in Peru to locally common in Brazil and "[a]pparently tolerates disturbed and partially man-modified habitats, and no specific threats are known."
