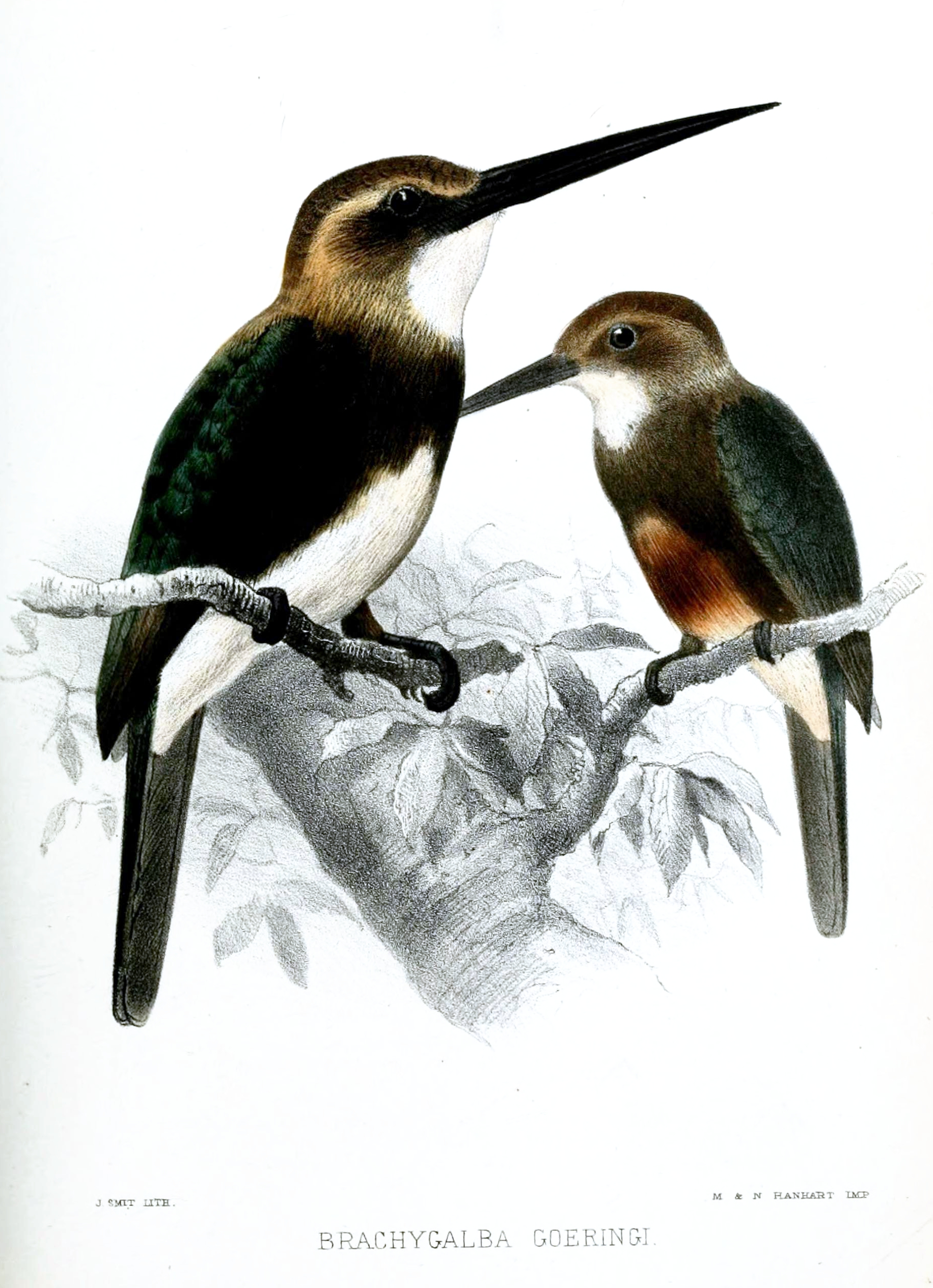
- Pale-headed jacamar (Brachygalba goeringi)

Scientific classification
- Kingdom: Animalia
- Phylum: Chordata
- Class: Aves
- Order: Piciformes
- Family: Galbulidae
- Genus: Brachygalba; Bonaparte, 1854

Type species
- Galbula albigularis von Spix, 1824

Species
- See text

= Brachygalba =

Genus of birds

Brachygalba is a genus of bird in the family Galbulidae.

== Species ==
It contains the following species:

Genus Brachygalba – Bonaparte, 1854 – four species
Common name	Scientific name and subspecies	Range	Size and ecology	IUCN status and estimated population
White-throated jacamar	Brachygalba albogularis (Spix, 1824)	Bolivia, Brazil and Peru	Size: Habitat: Diet:	LC
Pale-headed jacamar	Brachygalba goeringi (Sclater, PL & Salvin, 1869)	Colombia and Venezuela	Size: Habitat: Diet:	LC
Brown jacamar	Brachygalba lugubris (Swainson, 1838) Seven subspecies: B. l. fulviventris Sclater (1891); B. l. caquetae Chapman (1917); B. l. lugubris Swainson (1838); B. l. obscuriceps Zimmer & Phelps (1947); B. l. naumburgae Chapman (1931); B. l. phaeonota Todd (1943); B. l. melanosterna Sclater (1855)	Bolivia, Brazil, Colombia, Ecuador, French Guiana, Guyana, Peru, Suriname, and Venezuela	Size: Habitat: Diet:	LC
Dusky-backed jacamar	Brachygalba salmoni Sclater, PL & Salvin, 1879	Colombia and Panama	Size: Habitat: Diet:	LC
