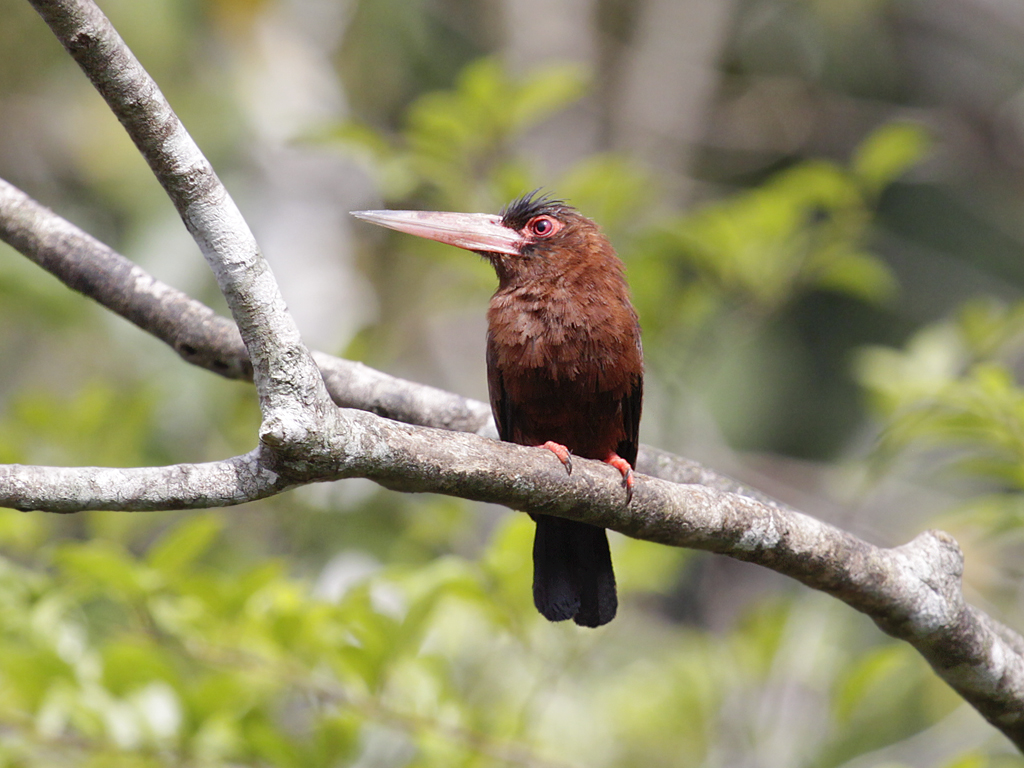
- Purus jacamar at Manu National Park, Peru

Scientific classification
- Kingdom: Animalia
- Phylum: Chordata
- Class: Aves
- Order: Piciformes
- Family: Galbulidae
- Genus: Galbalcyrhynchus; Des Murs, 1845

Type species
- Galbalcyrhynchus leucotis Des Murs, 1845

Species
- See text

= Galbalcyrhynchus =

Genus of birds

Galbalcyrhynchus is a genus of birds in the Galbulidae family. Established by Marc Athanese Parfait Oeillet Des Murs in 1845, it contains the following species:

== Species ==
Genus Galbalcyrhynchus – Des Murs, 1845 – two species
Common name	Scientific name and subspecies	Range	Size and ecology	IUCN status and estimated population
White-eared jacamar	Galbalcyrhynchus leucotis Des Murs, 1845	Amazon Basin of western Brazil, Colombia, Ecuador and northern Peru	Size: 18 to 21 cm (7.1 to 8.3 in) long and weighs 44 to 50 g (1.6 to 1.8 oz) Habitat: Diet:	LC
Purus jacamar	Galbalcyrhynchus purusianus Goeldi, 1904	Amazon Basin of western Brazil, northern Bolivia and eastern Peru.	Size: 20 cm (7.9 in) long and weighs 50 g (1.8 oz) Habitat: Diet:	LC

The name Galbalcyrhynchus is a combination of the genus name Galbula (used for many of the jacamars) and the genus name Alcyone (used for some of the kingfishers) with the Greek word rhunkhos, meaning "bill".
