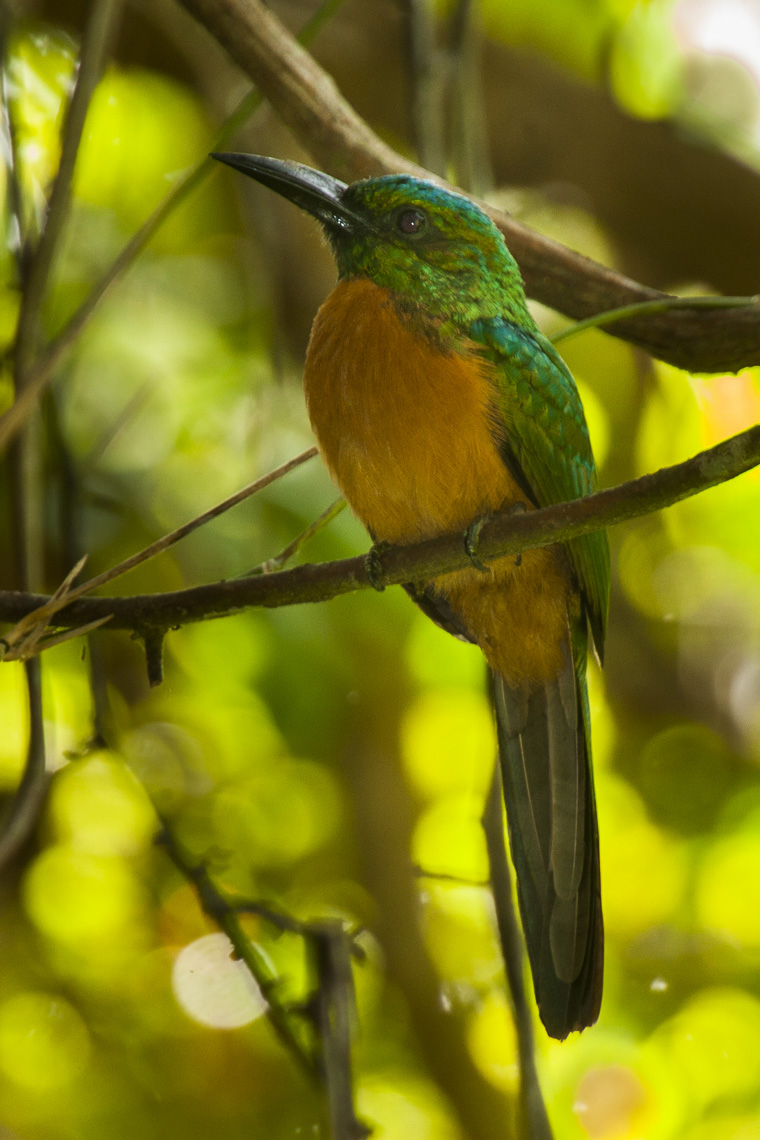

Conservation status
- Least Concern (IUCN 3.1)

Scientific classification
- Kingdom: Animalia
- Phylum: Chordata
- Class: Aves
- Order: Piciformes
- Family: Galbulidae
- Genus: Jacamerops; Lesson, 1830
- Species: J. aureus

Binomial name
- Jacamerops aureus (Statius Müller, 1776)

= Great jacamar =

Species of bird

Jacamerops aureus - Great Jacamar XC251029

The great jacamar (Jacamerops aureus) is a species of bird in the family Galbulidae. It is placed in the monotypic genus Jacamerops. It is found in Bolivia, Brazil, Colombia, Costa Rica, Ecuador, French Guiana, Guyana, Panama, Peru, Suriname, and Venezuela, where its natural habitat is subtropical and tropical moist lowland forests.

== Taxonomy ==
German zoologist Philipp Ludwig Statius Müller described the species in 1776. The species name is the Latin adjective aureus "golden". In 2000, the binomial name was changed from J. aurea to J. aureus so the species name agreed in gender with the genus name.

== Description ==
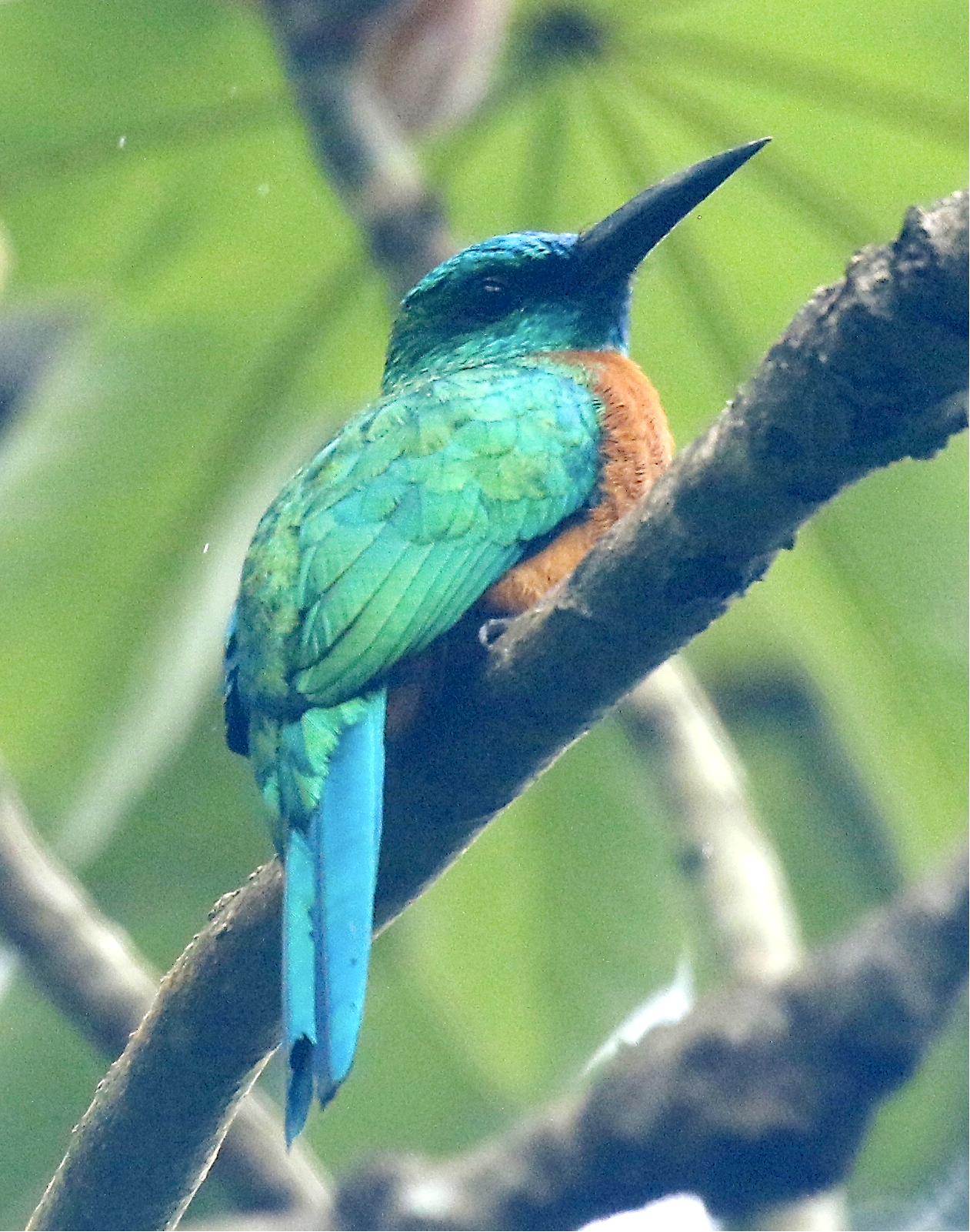
San Francisco Reserve - Darien, Panama

It measures 25 to 30 cm (9.8 to 11.8 in) in length and weighs between 57 and 70 g (2.0 and 2.5 oz). As indicated by its name, this is the largest species of jacamar and much bulkier than any other species in the family. The adult male chin, cheeks and upper region are all bright metallic green with gold overtones, with a blueish tinge on the chin, forehead and tail and purple copper on the back. The lower part of the throat is white and the rest of the lower region is deep rufous. The primaries are black, the tail is blue-black, below the beak is black, and the legs are dark horn-colored. The female resembles the male, but has no white spot on the throat. Like all members of the order Piciformes, jacamars and their relatives have zygodactyl feet, with two toes pointing forward and two facing back. Jacamars evolved with this toe arrangement, which helps them grasp branches while hunting in trees. Because 13 of the 17 Galbulidae species belong to super-species complexes, researcher J. Haffer concludes that jacamars had a relatively recent Pleistocene radiation of the family. Jacamars are believed to have originated in the Amazon region where they are most common, and spread to other parts of Central and South America. Unique anatomical features of this family include a long appendix, no gall bladder, a bare preen gland, and a long, thin tongue.

== Habitat ==
Its natural habitat is the natural tropical forest to 500 m (1,640 ft) altitude. It lives in the middle levels of the canopy and inside the shaded edges of the rainforest, usually on the banks of streams. It can be difficult to spot because it is noted for sitting in one spot for a long period of time.

== Food ==
It feeds on insects caught in flight, and on spiders on vegetation. While sitting in its canopy, they prey by following after them, and then by beating them against a branch before they consume it. Some of the jacamars will also eat small vertebrates like lizards.

== Reproduction ==
It breeds from March to May or June. Its nest is a chamber made of a termite nest, at a height between 3 and 15 m (10 and 49 ft). These birds will bore holes in arboreal termitaria 3-15 m above ground. The incubation time for the great jacamar is about 20–23 days. The chicks come out from their nest around 21–26 days; When they emerge they are covered in white down. Both male and female jacamars incubate and will care for their chicks. Jacamars lay one to four round, glossy, white eggs. Both parents incubate the eggs during the day for one to three hours at a time. At night, the female incubates alone while the male stays nearby to defend the nest. Jacamars rarely leave eggs unattended.

== Conservation ==
This species has an extremely large range, and does not approach the requirements for classification as a Vulnerable species under the range size criterion (Extent of Occurrence <20,000 km2 combined with a declining or fluctuating range size, habitat extent/quality, or population size and a small number of locations or severe fragmentation). Even though the population appears to be decreasing, the decline is not presumed to approach Vulnerable under the population trend criterion (>30% decline over ten years or three generations). The population size has not been calculated, but it is not believed to reach the definition of Vulnerable under the population size criterion (<10,000 mature individuals with a continuing decline estimated to be >10% in ten years or three generations, or with a specified population structure). For the reasons listed above the species is labeled as Least Concern.
