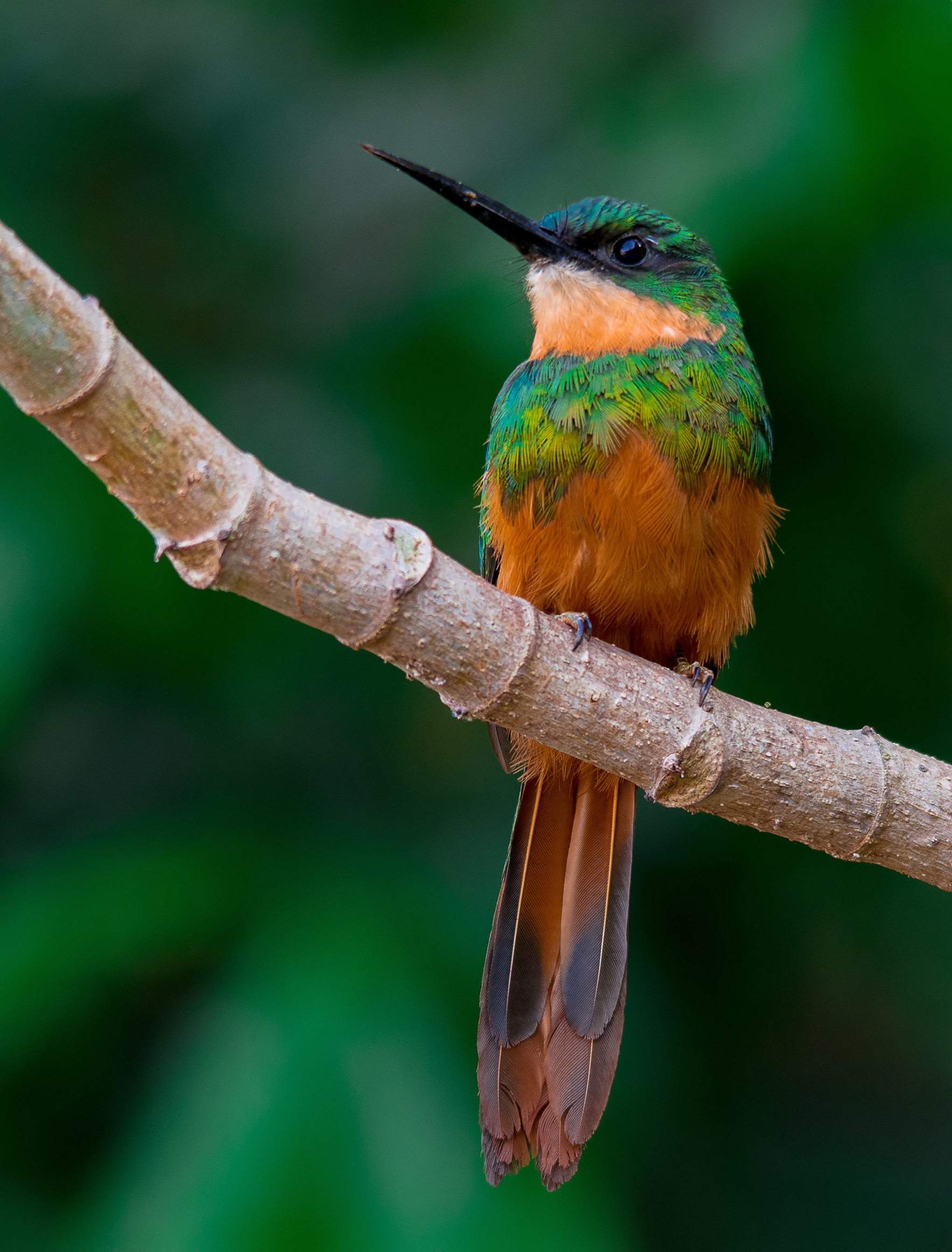
- Adult female rufous-tailed jacamar (Galbula ruficauda melanogenia)

Scientific classification
- Kingdom: Animalia
- Phylum: Chordata
- Class: Aves
- Order: Piciformes
- Family: Galbulidae
- Genus: Galbula; Brisson, 1760

Type species
- Alcedo galbula Linnaeus, 1766

Species
- 10, see text

= Galbula =

Galbula Temporal range: Miocene-Recent 13–0 Ma

Genus of birds

Galbula is the type and largest genus of the jacamar family (Galbulidae) of piciform birds, and its suborder Galbulae. Sometimes, the Piciformes are split in two, with the Galbulae upranked to full order Galbuliformes.

== Taxonomy ==
The genus was introduced by the French zoologist Mathurin Jacques Brisson in 1760 with the green-tailed jacamar (Galbula galbula) as the type species. The name galbula is the Latin word for a small yellow bird.

== Description ==
They are smallish to mid-sized forest birds of the Neotropics, with long pointed bills, elongated tails, and small feet. Colored in metallic iridescent hues – typically greenish – at least on the upperside, some have a red or brownish belly. Males and females are generally similar in appearance, but in most species differ in minor plumage details. As usual for Piciformes, they nest in burrows they dig out themselves. In the case of this genus, nests are dug in earthen banks along rivers or roads, or in termitaria. As with other jacamars but otherwise unknown among Piciformes, their chicks do not hatch naked. They have a piping song and feed in typical jacamar fashion, by catching flying arthropods, typically larger insects such has butterflies.

Most Galbula species are fairly common in their natural range, which despite rampant deforestation is still extensive. Only the coppery-chested jacamar (G. pastazae) occurs in a more restricted region in the Andes foothills, and is considered a threatened species.

== Species ==
Ten living species are presently recognized in this genus:

Image	Scientific name	Common name	Distribution
	Galbula albirostris	Yellow-billed jacamar	Brazil, Colombia, French Guiana, Guyana, Suriname, and Venezuela
	Galbula cyanicollis	Blue-necked jacamar	Amazon rainforest of Brazil, far northern Bolivia and eastern Peru
	Galbula ruficauda	Rufous-tailed jacamar	southern Mexico, Central America and South America as far south as southern Brazil and Ecuador
	Galbula galbula	Green-tailed jacamar	Brazil, Colombia, French Guiana, Guyana, Suriname, and Venezuela
	Galbula pastazae	Coppery-chested jacamar	southern Colombia, Ecuador and far northern Peru
	Galbula cyanescens	Bluish-fronted jacamar	western Amazon Basin of Brazil, Peru and far northwestern Bolivia.
	Galbula tombacea	White-chinned jacamar	Amazon Basin of Colombia, Amazonas and northern parts of Ecuador and Peru
	Galbula chalcothorax	Purplish jacamar	western Amazon Basin of Ecuador, Peru, southern Colombia and western parts of Acre and Amazonas
	Galbula leucogastra	Bronzy jacamar	Bolivia, Brazil, Colombia, French Guiana, Guyana, Suriname, and Venezuela
	Galbula dea	Paradise jacamar	Bolivia, Brazil, Colombia, Ecuador, Peru and the Guyanas

A fossil species, Galbula hylochoreutes, has been described from the mid-Miocene of Colombia. It was apparently more specialized for aerial feeding than the living species.
