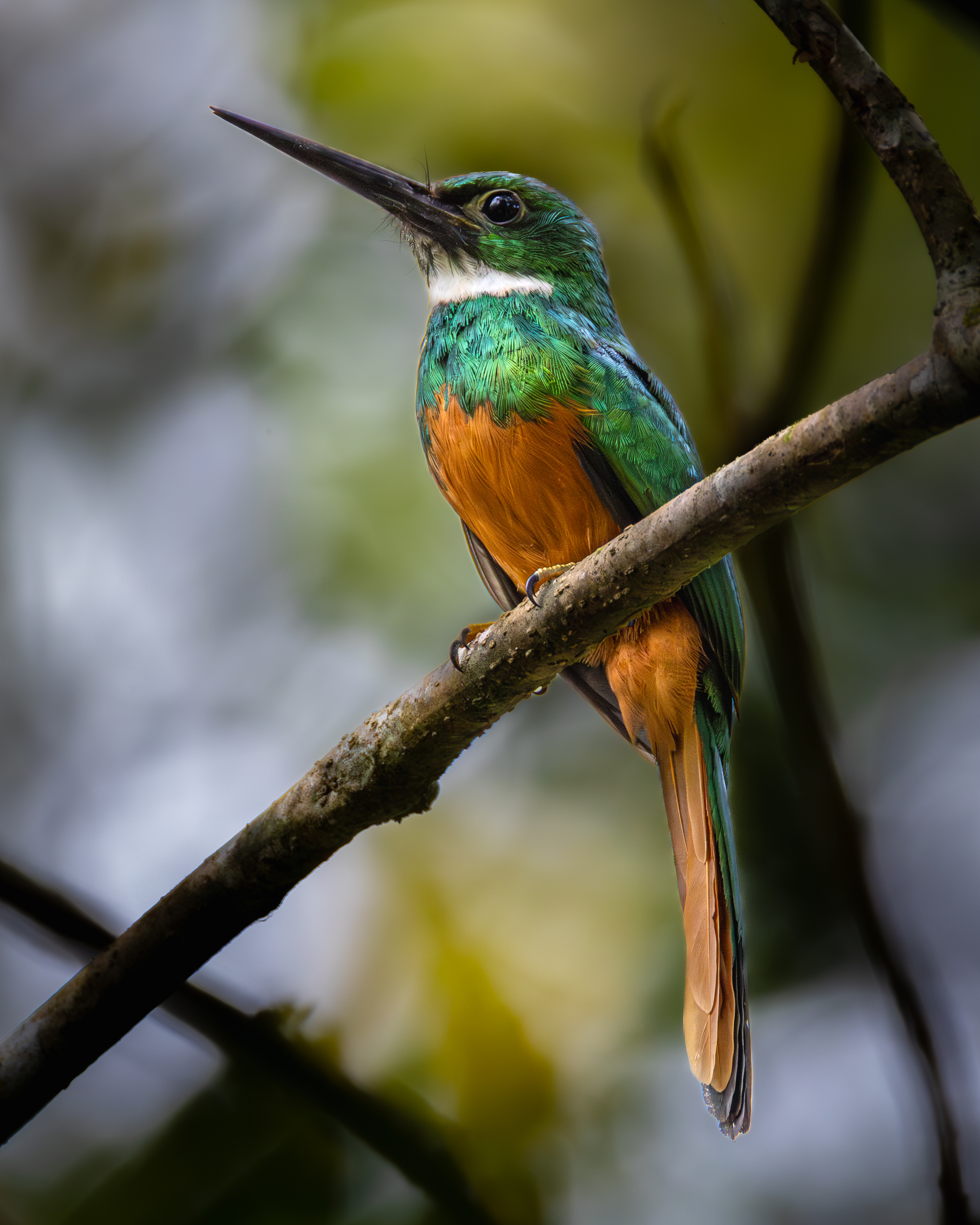
- Male Rufous-tailed Jacamar, Costa Rica
- Male G. r. rufoviridis in the Pantanal, Brazil, and a recording from Ecuador

Conservation status
- Least Concern (IUCN 3.1)

Scientific classification
- Kingdom: Animalia
- Phylum: Chordata
- Class: Aves
- Order: Piciformes
- Family: Galbulidae
- Genus: Galbula
- Species: G. ruficauda

Binomial name
- Galbula ruficauda Cuvier, 1816

= Rufous-tailed jacamar =

Species of bird

The rufous-tailed jacamar (Galbula ruficauda) is a bird in the family Galbulidae that breeds in the tropical New World in southern Mexico, Central America and South America as far south as southern Brazil and Ecuador.

== Description ==
Like other jacamars they are elegant, brightly coloured birds with long bills and tails. The rufous-tailed jacamar is typically 25 cm (10 in) long with a 5 cm (2 in) long black bill. The subspecies G. r. brevirostris has, as its name implies, a shorter bill. This bird is metallic green above, and the underparts are mainly orange, including the undertail, but there is a green breast band. Sexes differ in that the male has a white throat, and the female a buff throat; she also tends to have paler underparts. The race G. r. pallens has a copper-coloured back in both sexes.

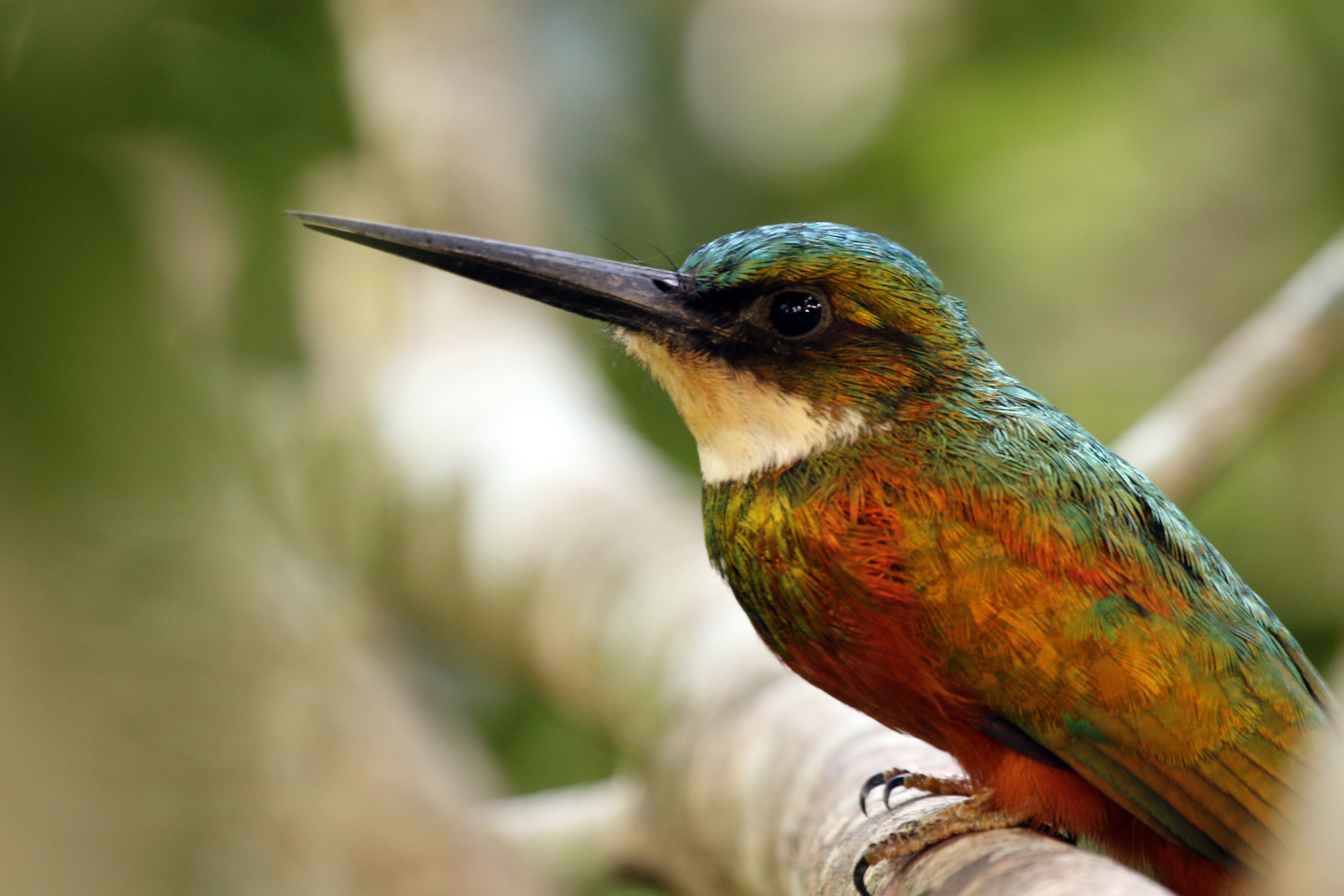
Male
G. r. ruficauda
Tobago

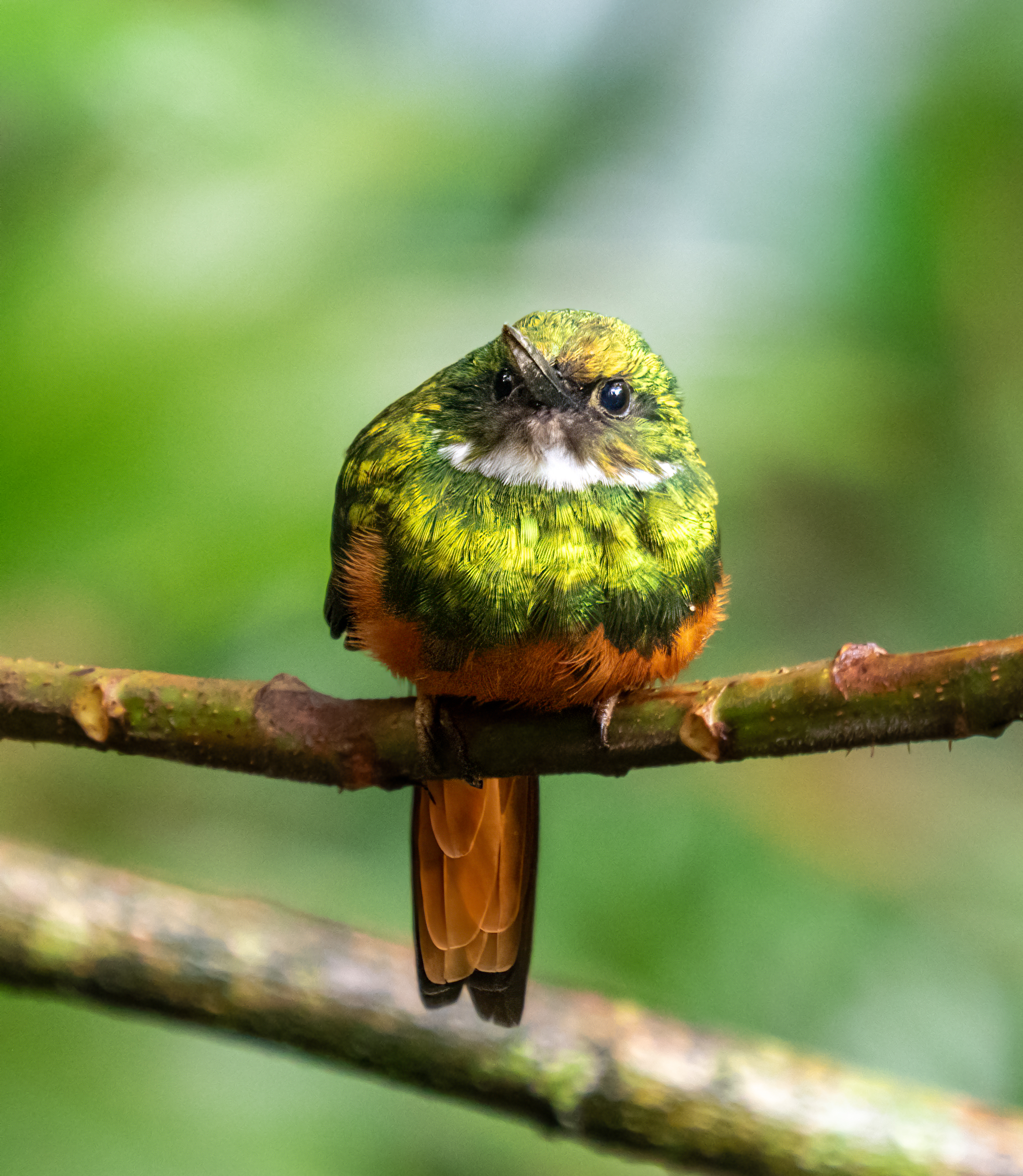
Male
G. r. melanogenia
Costa Rica

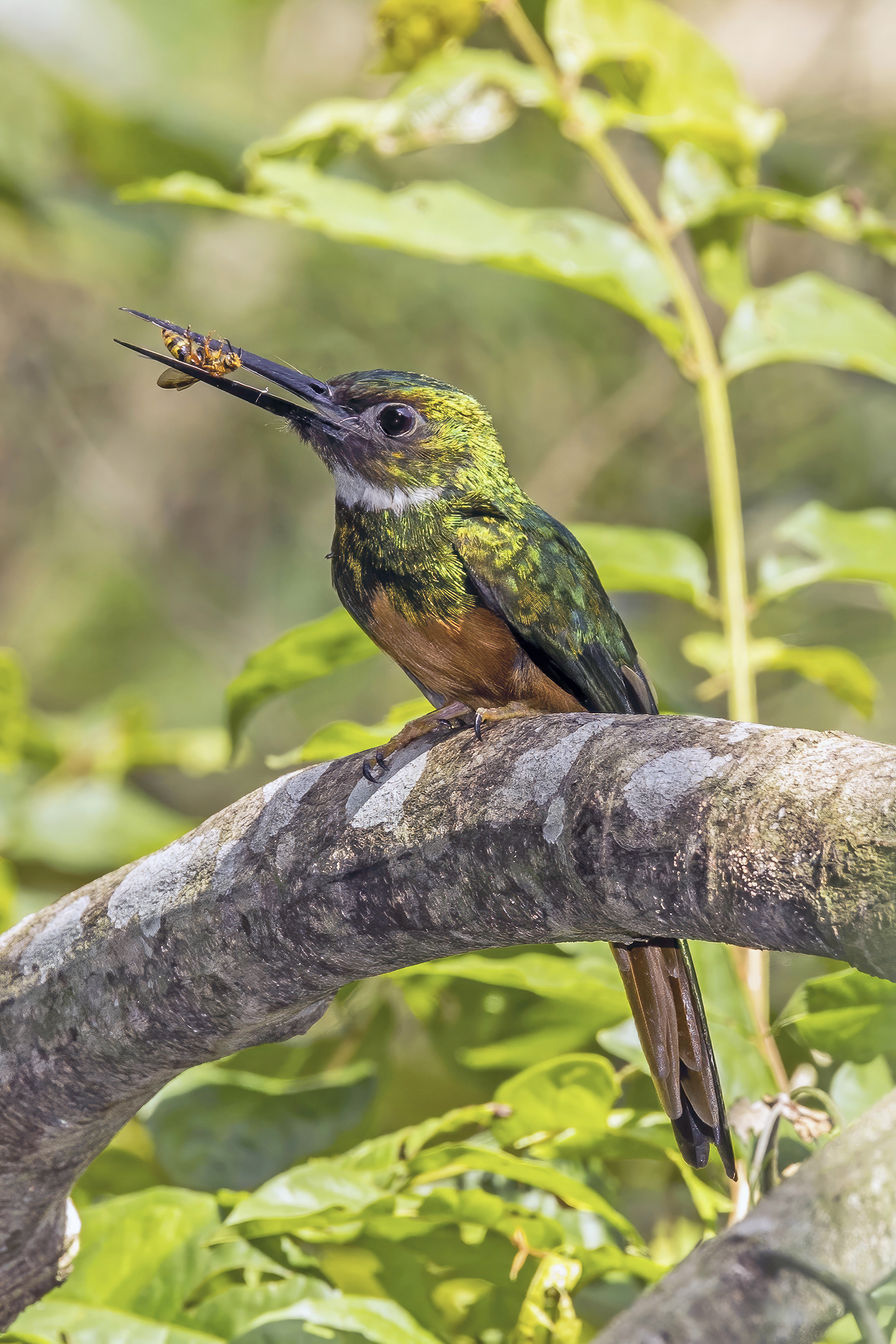
Male G. r. melanogenia with an insect, Belize

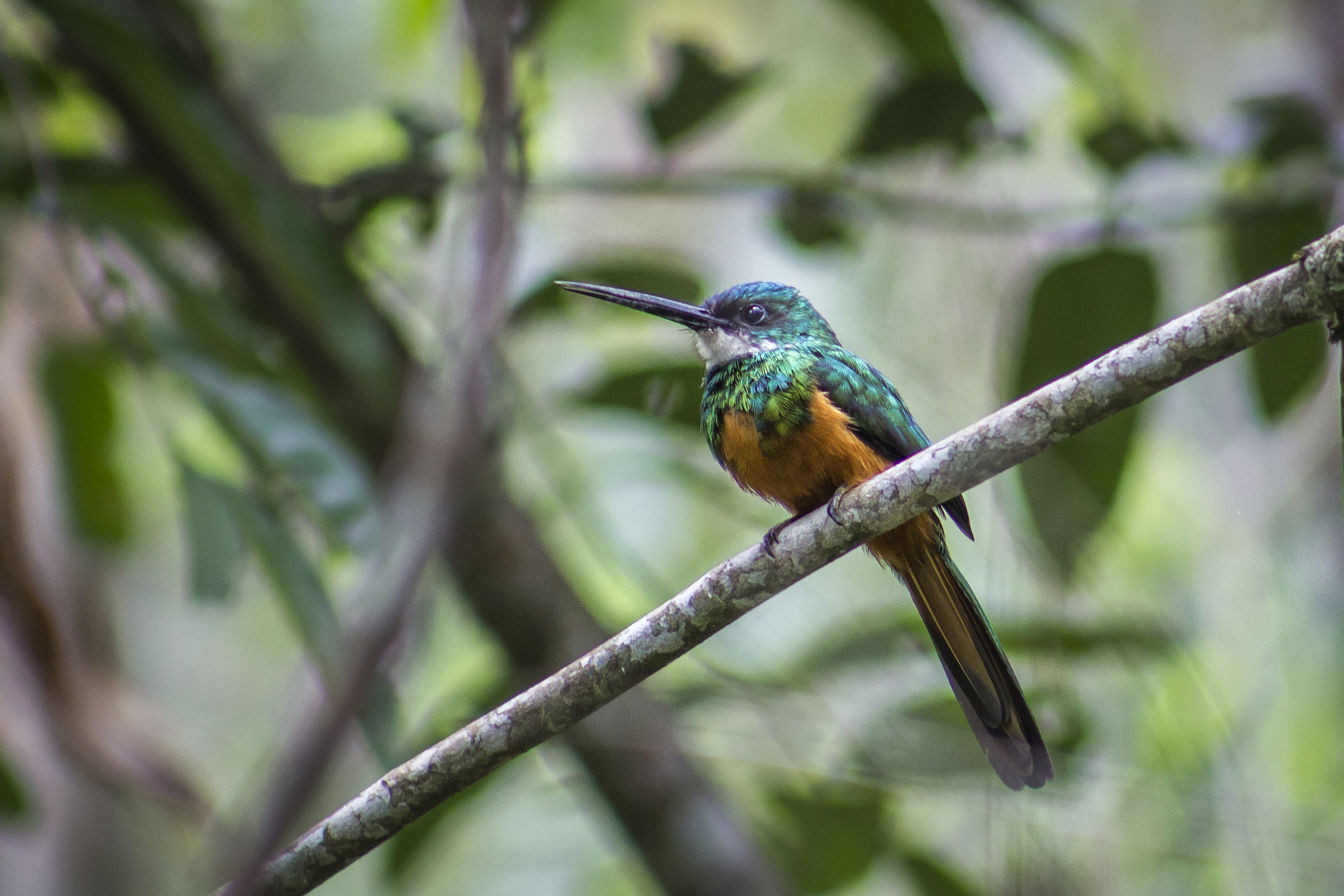
Male
G. r. rufoviridis
Chapada dos Veadeiros National Park

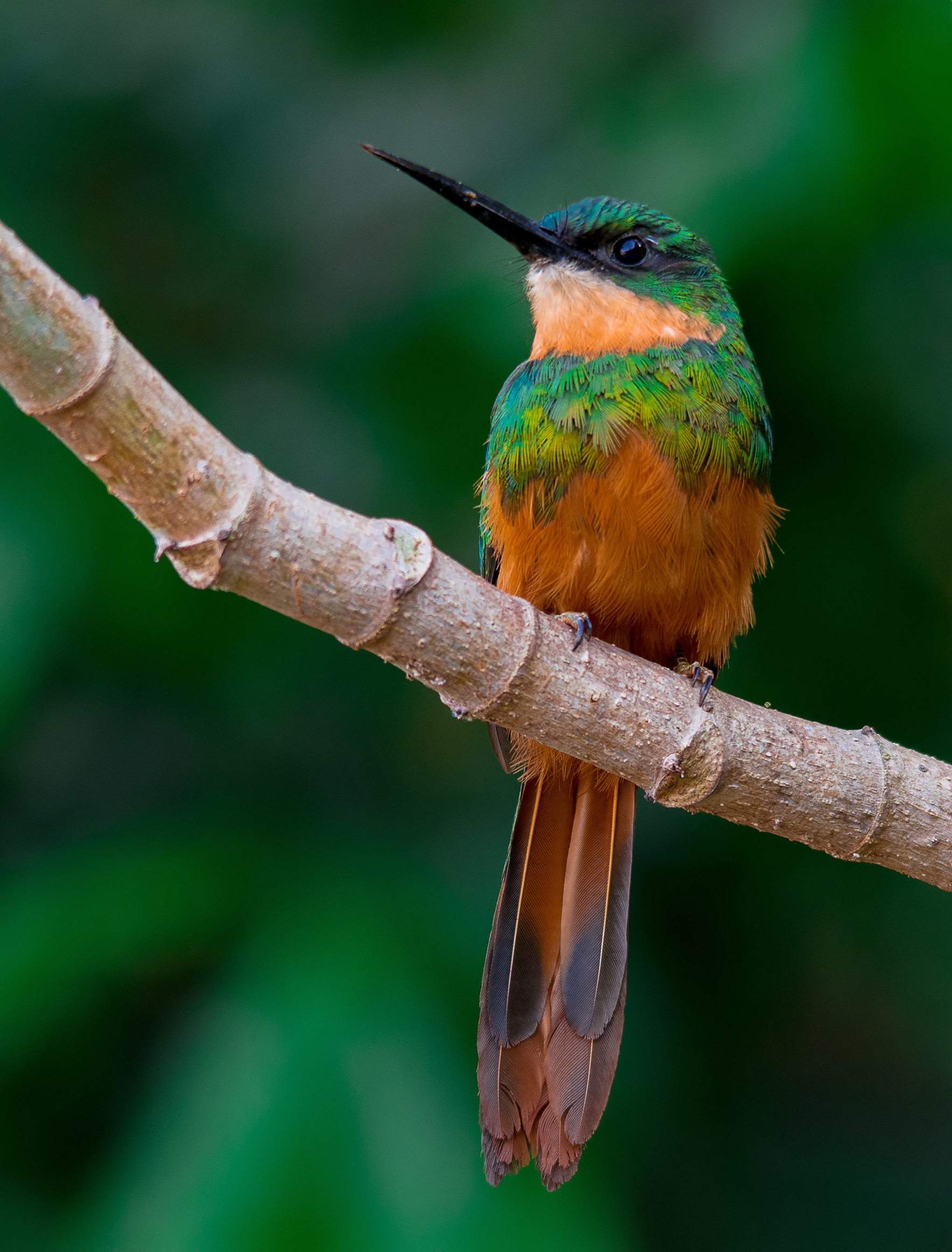
Female, Brazil

== Food and foraging ==
This insectivore hunts from a perch, sitting with its bill tilted up, then flying out to catch flying insects. One commonly preyed upon insect is the social wasp Agelaia vicina. Other insect prey include flies, beetles, bees, dragonflies, and butterflies. Further, the bird distinguishes between edible and unpalatable butterflies mainly according to body shape.

== Nesting ==
This species is a resident breeder in a range of dry or moist woodlands and scrub. The two to four rufous-spotted white eggs are laid in a burrow in a bank or termite mound.

== Vocalizations ==
The rufous-tailed jacamar's call is a sharp pee-op, and the song a high thin peeo-pee-peeo-pee-pe-pe, ending in a trill.

== Bibliography ==
- ffrench, Richard (1991). A Guide to the Birds of Trinidad and Tobago (2nd ed.). Comstock Publishing. ISBN 0-8014-9792-2.
- Hilty, Steven L (2003). Birds of Venezuela. London: Christopher Helm. ISBN 0-7136-6418-5.
