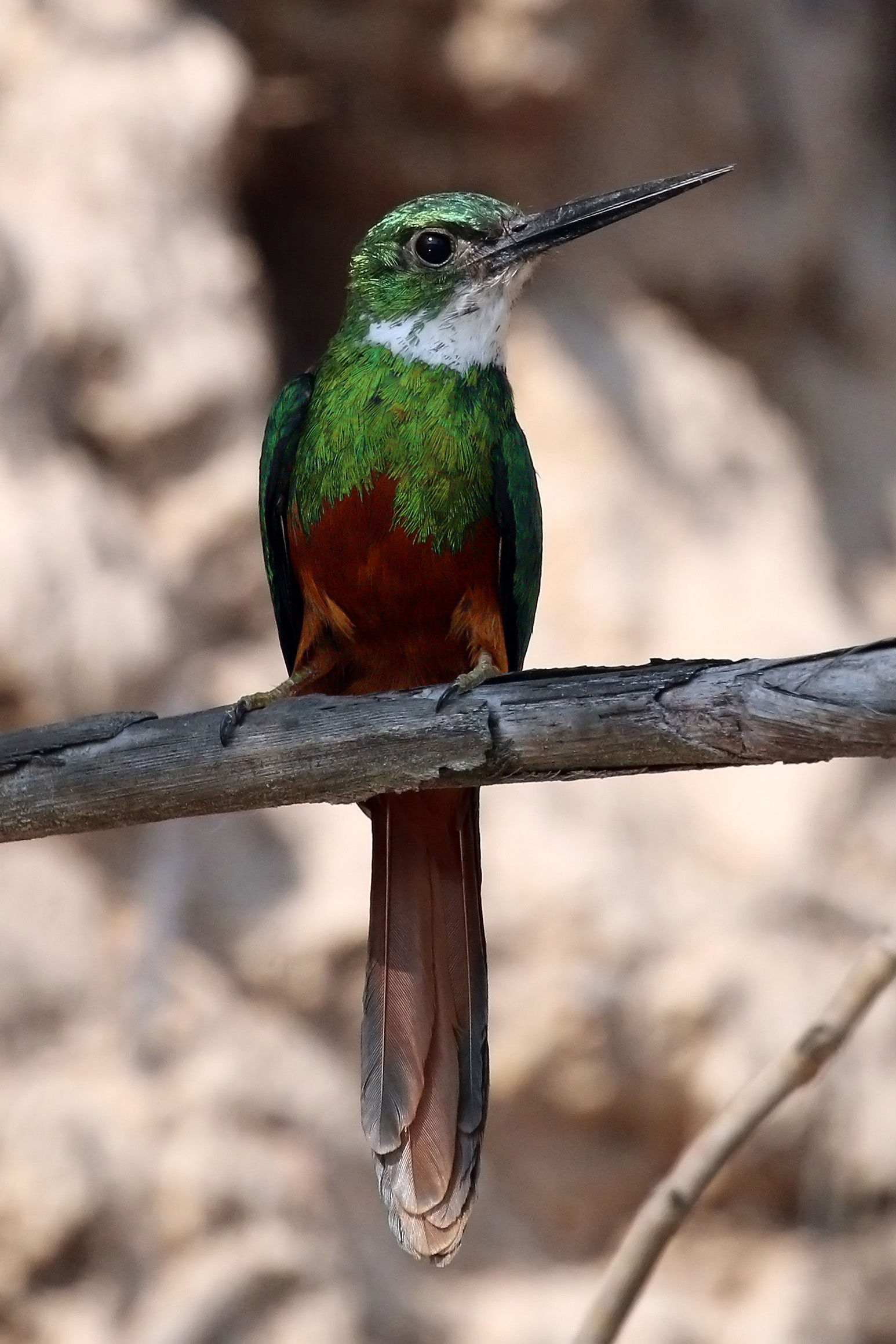
- Rufous-tailed jacamar (Galbula ruficauda)

Scientific classification
- Kingdom: Animalia
- Phylum: Chordata
- Class: Aves
- Order: Piciformes
- Suborder: Galbuli
- Family: Galbulidae; Vigors, 1825

Genera
- Galbalcyrhynchus; Brachygalba; Jacamaralcyon; Galbula; Jacamerops

= Jacamar =

Jacamars

Family of birds

The jacamars are a family, Galbulidae, of birds from tropical South and Central America, extending up to Mexico. The family contains five genera and 18 species. The family is closely related to the puffbirds, another Neotropical family, and the two families are often separated into their own order, Galbuliformes, separate from the Piciformes. They are principally birds of low-altitude woodlands and forests, and particularly of forest edge and canopy.

== Taxonomy ==
The placement of the combined puffbird and jacamar lineage was in question, with some bone and muscle features suggesting they may be more closely related to the Coraciiformes. However, analysis of nuclear DNA in a 2003 study placed them as sister group to the rest of the Piciformes, also showing that the groups had developed zygodactyl feet before separating. Per Ericson and colleagues, in analysing genomic DNA, confirmed that puffbirds and jacamars were sister groups and their place in Piciformes.

The phylogenetic relationship between the jacamars and the eight other families in the order Piciformes is shown in the cladogram below. The number of species in each family is taken from the list maintained by Frank Gill, Pamela C. Rasmussen and David Donsker on behalf of the International Ornithological Committee (IOC).

- Piciformes
  - - Galbulidae – jacamars (18 species)
    - Bucconidae – puffbirds (38 species)
  - - - Indicatoridae – honeyguides (16 species)
      - Picidae – woodpeckers (240 species)
    - - Megalaimidae – Asian barbets (35 species)
      - - Lybiidae – African barbets (42 species)
        - - Capitonidae – New World barbets (15 species)
          - - Semnornithidae – toucan barbets (2 species)
            - Ramphastidae – toucans (43 species)

== Description ==
The jacamars are small to medium-sized perching birds, 14–34 cm (5.5–13.4 in) in length and weighing 17–75 g (0.60–2.65 oz). They are elegant, glossy birds with long bills and tails. In appearance and behaviour they resemble the Old World bee-eaters, as most aerial insectivores tend to have short, wide bills rather than long, thin ones. The legs are short and weak, and the feet are zygodactylic (two forward-pointing toes, two backward-pointing). Their plumage is often bright and highly iridescent, although it is quite dull in a few species. There are minor differences in plumage based on sex, males often having a white patch on the breast.

== Behaviour ==
=== Diet and feeding ===
Jacamars are insectivores, taking a variety of insect prey (many specialize on butterflies and moths) by hawking in the air. Birds sit in favoured perches and sally towards the prey when it is close enough. Only the great jacamar varies from the rest of the family, taking prey by gleaning and occasionally taking small lizards and spiders.

=== Breeding ===
The breeding systems of jacamars have not been studied in depth. They are thought to generally be monogamous, although a few species are thought to engage in cooperative breeding sometimes, with several adults sharing duties. The family nests in holes either in the soil or in arboreal termite mounds. Ground-nesting species usually nest in the banks of rivers (or, more recently, roads), although if these are not available they will nest in the soil held by the roots of fallen trees. Bank-nesting jacamars can sometimes be loosely colonial. Clutch sizes are between one and four eggs, and usually more than one. Both parents participate in incubation. Little is known about the incubation times of most species, but it lasts between 19 and 26 days in the rufous-tailed jacamar. Chicks are born with down feathers, unique among the piciformes.
