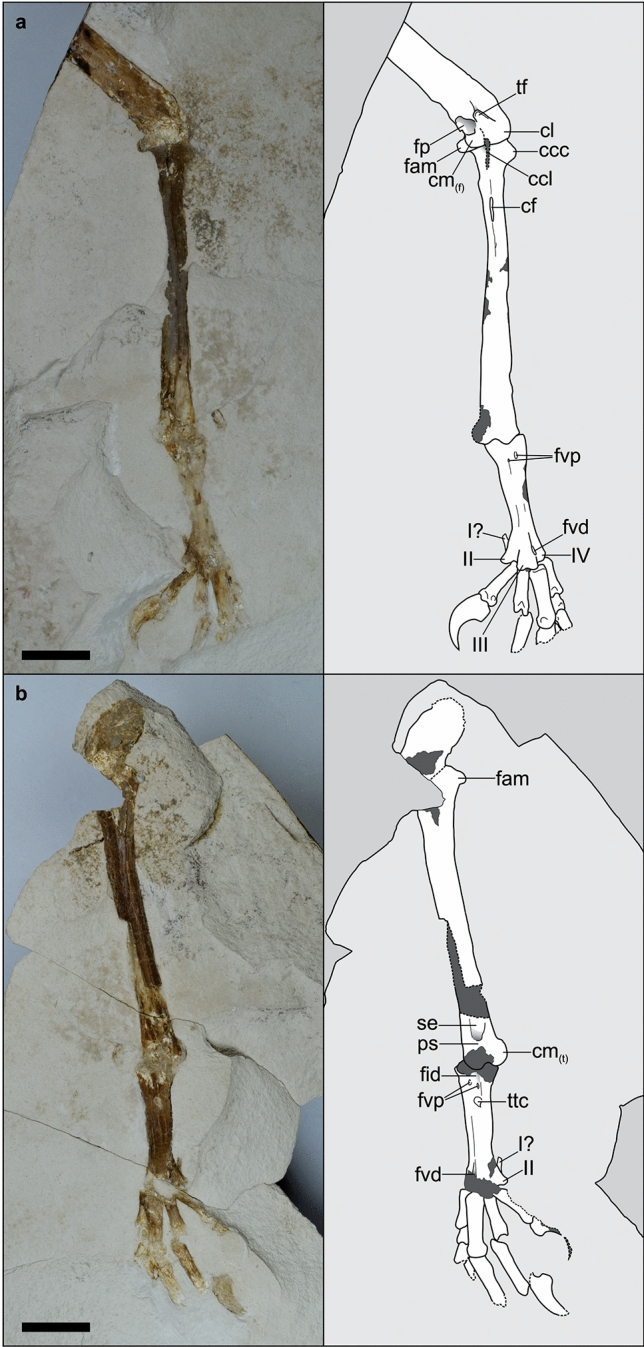
- Holotype of Ueekenkcoracias, preserved as part and counterpart slabs

Scientific classification
- Kingdom: Animalia
- Phylum: Chordata
- Class: Aves
- Genus: †Ueekenkcoracias; Degrange et al., 2021
- Species: †U. tambussiae

Binomial name
- †Ueekenkcoracias tambussiae Degrange et al., 2021

= Ueekenkcoracias =

Ueekenkcoracias Temporal range: Eocene, 52.2 Ma

Extinct genus of birds

Ueekenkcoracias is an extinct genus of bird from the Huitrera Formation of Patagonia. Initially assigned to Coracii, similarities have instead been noted with Palaeopsittacus, and it may instead be more closely related to Strisores, the clade including hummingbirds, nightjars, and swifts. One species of Ueekenkcoracias, U. tambussiae, has been named.

== Discovery and naming ==
The holotype of Ueekenkcoracias (MPEF-PV 10991) was recovered from the Laguna del Hunco locality, which consists of strata belonging to the Huitrera Formation of Patagonia. The locality has been dated to 52.2 Ma, based on argon-argon dating and palaeomagnetic stratigraphy. The specimen was described in 2021, by Federico J. Degrange, Diego Pol, Pablo Puerta, and Peter Wilf.

The generic name of Ueekenkcoracias is derived from the native Tehuelche word ueekenk ("outsider"), in reference to its unusual presence in South America, and Coracias. The species name, U. tambussiae, honors Claudia Patricia Tambussi, to commemorate her contributions to South American palaeornithology.

== Description ==
The holotype specimen of Ueekenkcoracias consists of an incomplete right leg, preserved as a slab and counterslab. As Coraciiformes, the tibiotarsus of the holotype is short and stout, proportionally longer than in Eocoracias. The crista cnemialis cranialis is small and triangular, but is more developed than that of Eocoracias,Paracoracias, rollers, kingfishers and bee-eaters. The diaphysis of the tibiotarsus is relatively stout, and is curved laterally (to the side). The pons supratendineus has a transverse disposition, as in Geranopteridae and motmots, and is located medially on the shaft, as in rollers and ground rollers. The distal (far) epiphysis widens distally, as in rollers, ground rollers and todies, but not as much as Leptosomidae. The tarsometatarsus of U. tambussiae is short and wide, measuring less than half the tibiotarsus' length, which is unlike most coraciiforms. The pedal (foot) phalanges are more robust than in coraciiforms, and the second bears a greatly enlarged ungual. In these regards, U. tambussiae resembles Palaeopsittacus.

== Taxonomy ==
In their paper describing Ueekenkcoracias, Degrange et al. (2021) performed a phylogenetic analysis which recovered it as the most basal member of Coracii. This position was supported by the lack of derived features, such as a deep infracotylar fossa on the tarsometatarsus, which are present in all other coraciians.

Below is a cladogram depicting the results of Degrange et al. (2021):

- - Tyto
  - - - Harpactes
      - Colius
    - Picocoraciae
      - - Coracii
          - †Ueekenkcoracias tambussiae
          - - †Primobucconidae
              - Primobucco
              - Septencoracias
            - - †Eocoracias
              - - †Paracoracias
                - - †Geranopterus
                  - - Atelornis
                    - Coracias
      - - - - Todus
            - Baryphthengus
          - - Merops
            - - Dacelo
              - Alcedo
        - - Nystalus
          - - Picoides
            - Pteroglossus
          - - Bucorvus
            - - Phoeniculus
              - Upupa

However, the results of the above phylogeny have been questioned. German palaeontologist Gerard Mayr noted that, contrary to Degrange et al., the limb elements of U. tambussiae were quite different from those of coraciians. He categorically dismissed the hypothesis that it was a coraciiform, and pointed out that the above traits were instead more similar to Palaeopsittacus, a European taxon that may be closer to Strisores (the clade including hummingbirds, nightjars, and swifts). The remains of U. tambussiae are too incomplete to make any firm judgements in regards to its phylogenetic position.
