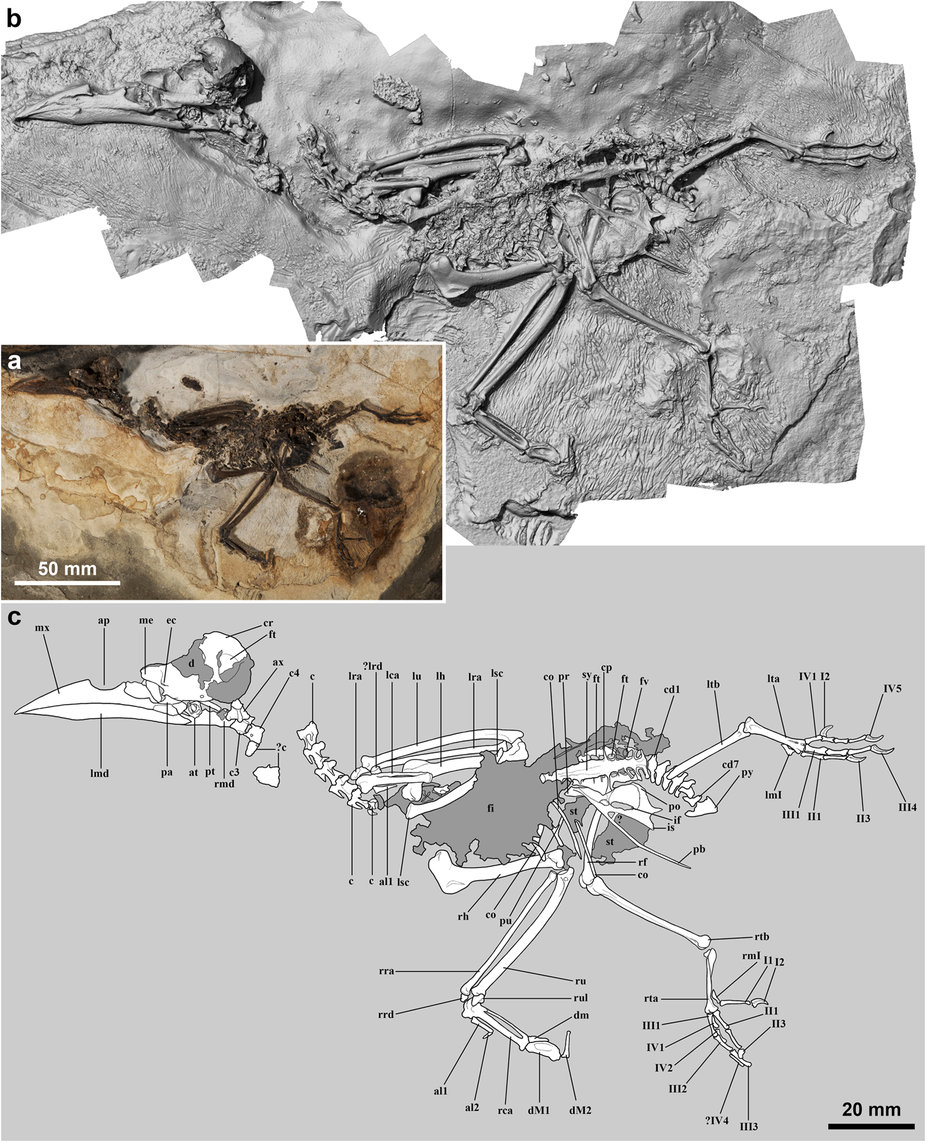
- Holotype specimen of S. morsensis

Scientific classification
- Kingdom: Animalia
- Phylum: Chordata
- Class: Aves
- Order: Coraciiformes
- Family: †Primobucconidae
- Genus: †Septencoracias; Bourdon et al., 2016

Type species
- †Septencoracias morsensis Bourdon et al., 2016

Other species
- †S. simillimus Mayr & Kitchener, 2024

= Septencoracias =

Septencoracias Temporal range: Eocene 54.2–53.9 Ma

Extinct genus of birds

Septencoracias is an extinct genus of bird related to modern rollers and other Coraciiformes such as kingfishers, bee-eaters, motmots, and todies. It contains two species, Septencoracias morsensis described in 2016, and S. simillimus, which was named in 2024. It was found in the Fur Formation of Denmark, dating back to the Ypresian of the Lower Eocene Epoch, about 54 million years ago. Septencoracias is one of the earliest known members of Coraciiformes, lending insight into the earliest radiation of this group.

== Description ==
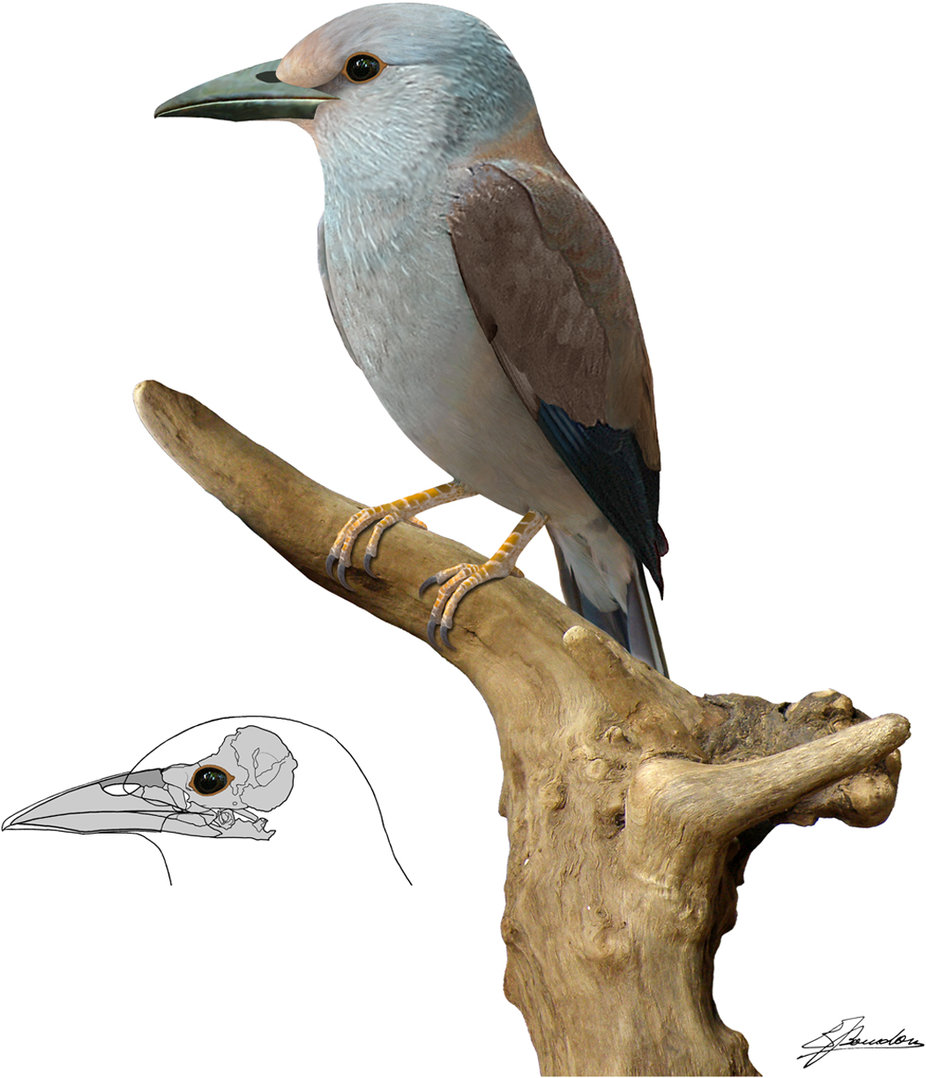
Restoration

Septencoracias was a small bird the size of a Northern carmine bee-eater, Merops nubicus, about 25 cm in length. It had a large skull in comparison to its body, about twice the length of the humerus. It is much larger than modern day rollers and its sister taxon Primobucco, more similar in size and proportion to kingfishers, motmots, and bee-eaters. It had a stout, slightly curved beak, and the upper ridge of the beak curves gradually towards the tip of the bill like in living roller species. This is different from Primobucco which has a stronger curvature on the anterior end of the beak. It had small, egg-shaped nasal openings, much different than any of its close extinct relatives or extant rollers, which have either elongated openings, slit-like openings, or large triangular nares.

The only fossil specimen of Septencoracias does not preserve the sternum and shoulder girdle, except for the left scapula, which is not bifurcated as in Late Eocene and later rollers. Like in Primobucco, Septencoracias has a small claw on its alular digit, which is usually absent in modern birds. Septencoracias had a very wide pelvis, and had similar proportions in its hind limbs as modern rollers. Though most modern Coraciiformes show syndactyly, with three forward-pointing toes and toes three and four fused at the base, Septencoracias is not entirely certain to have this condition. The third and fourth digit do lie on top of each other in the fossil, with the second digit separated; however in the left foot the fourth digit is slightly separated from the third, and thus it cannot be said for certain if this condition is present in Septencoracias.

The fossil remains show soft tissue preservation, mostly in the thoracic and abdominal cavities, though portions were also seen in the skull. Apart from remains of potential food material, these remains have not been thoroughly examined.

== Discovery and naming ==
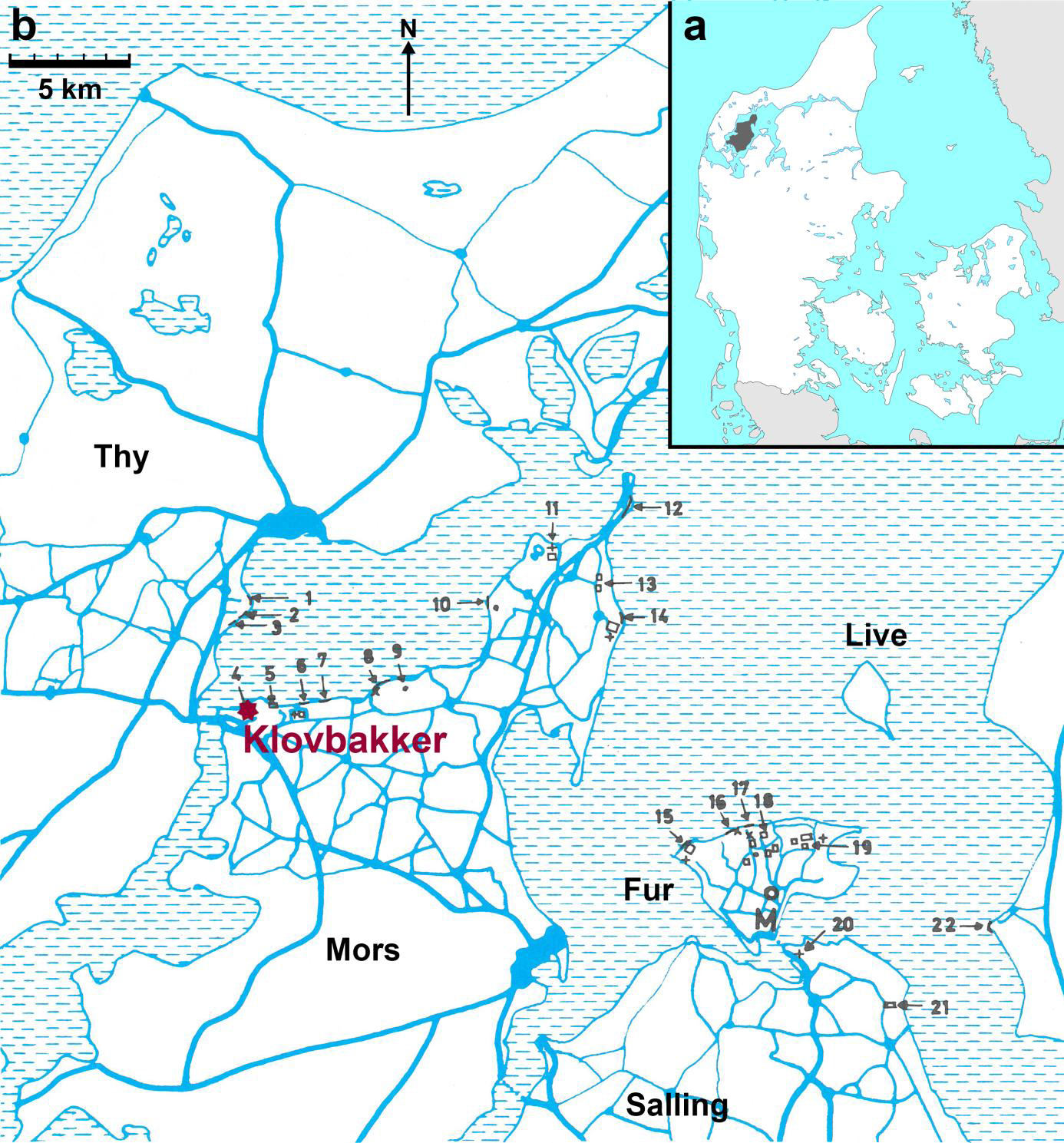
Map showing where the holotype was found

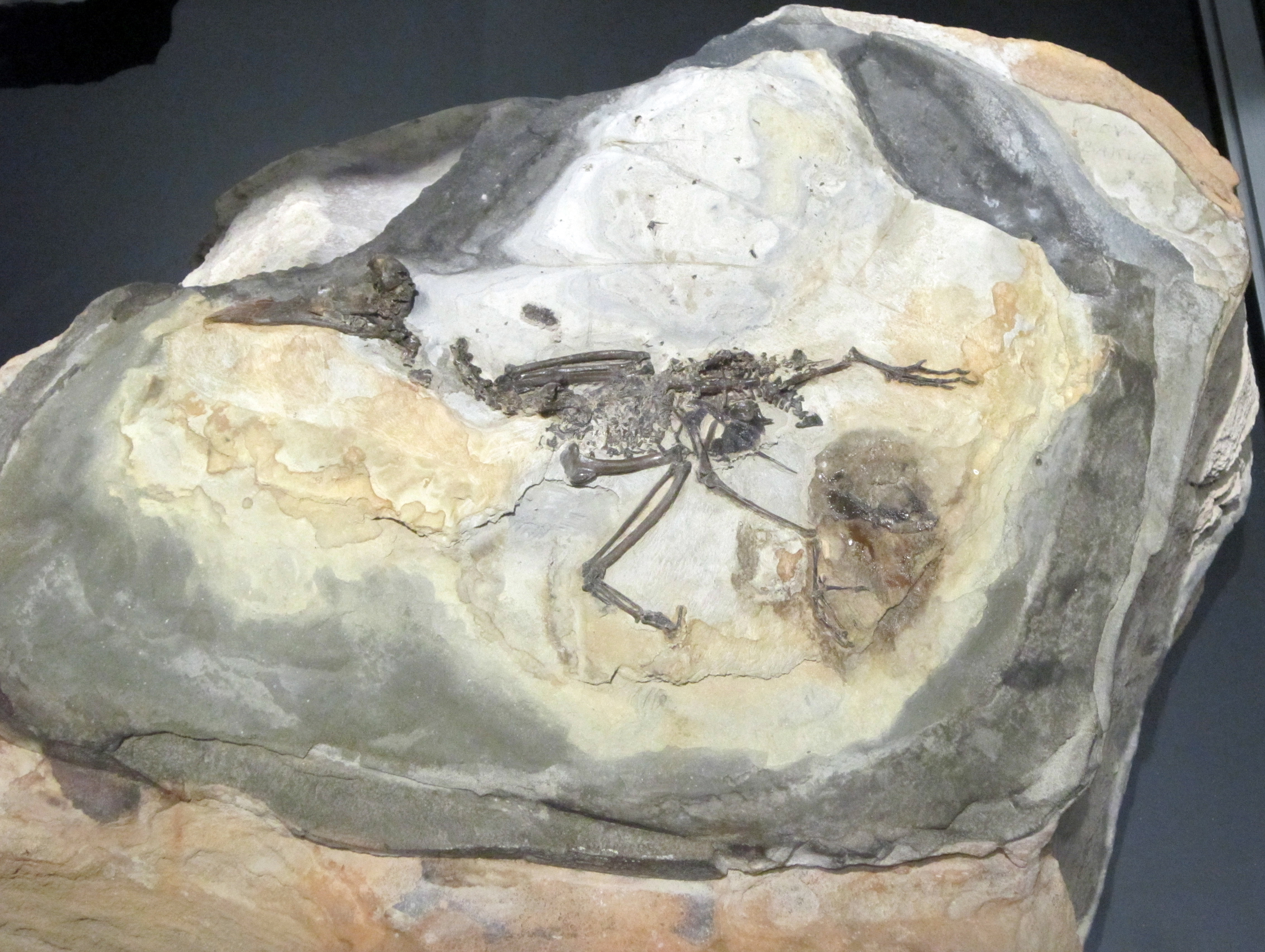
Block containing the holotype

Septencoracias is based on a single specimen, MGUH.VP 9509, consisting of most of the skeleton but lacking the sternum and portions of the shoulder girdle. The specimen was preserved in three dimensions, with the skull partly eroded due to it being exposed at the time of discovery. It was discovered in the Moclay Pit on the Island of Mors, in Jutland, Denmark, in the Fur Formation. This location dates to the Ypresian age of the Early Eocene, around 54 million years ago. It was found during a geology field course in an abandoned diatomite quarry. The genus name stems from 'septentrio', meaning north, and the genus name of many modern rollers, Coracias. The specific name stems from the Island of Mors.

An additional specimen from the Tielt Formation in Egem, Belgium was referred to cf. Septencoracias sp. in 2019. The specimen only consists of an isolated tarsometatarsus, however it resembles that of Septencoracias in both size and shape more than any other fossil Coraciiformes, although it is slightly larger.

== Classification ==
A phylogenetic analysis in 2016 recovered Septencoracias as the sister taxon of Primobucco. The most parsimonious tree, based on 21 taxa, is shown below.

- Afroaves
  - - Tyto
  - - - Colius
      - Harpactes
  - Picocoraciae
    - Coracii
      - - Septencoracias
        - Primobucco
      - - Eocoracias
        - - Paracoracias
          - - Geranopterus
            - - Coracias
              - Atelornis
    - - - - Baryphthengus
          - Todus
        - - Merops
          - - Alcedo
            - Dacelo
      - - - Nystalus
          - - Pteroglossus
            - Picoides
        - - Bucorvus
          - - Upupa
            - Phoeniculus

== Paleobiology ==
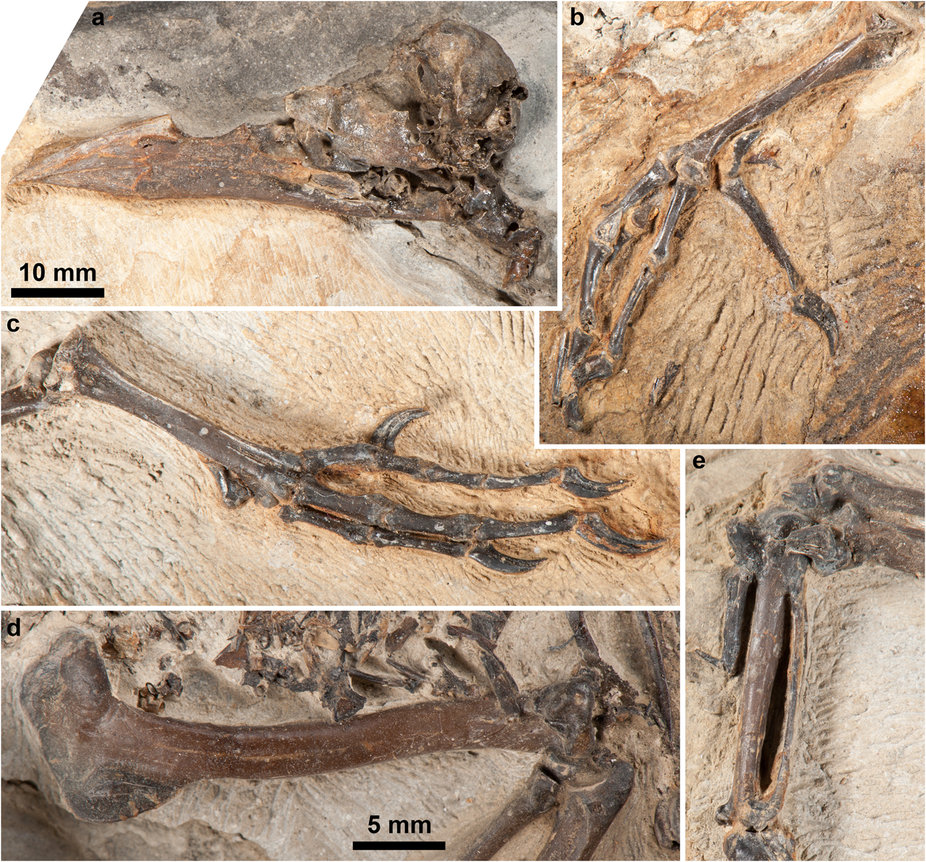
Elements of the holotype

Septencoracias is the oldest known member of the Coraciiformes, so it shows that this group was already fairly diversified by the Early Eocene, following the end-Cretaceous extinction. It already shows many of the derived characteristics of this group, as well as characteristics shared by its sister taxon, Primobucco. It was found with fish remains in its gut, of a very common taxon from the Fur Formation, argentinoids of about 10 cm in length. These may be the contents of the stomach, indicating that Septencoracias fed upon these fish prior to its death, and they were dissociated due to digestion and may have spread outside of the abdomen due to decay and breakage. This contributes to the idea that early roller and roller relatives had a much more varied diet than modern members of the group, which almost exclusively feed upon insects and small land vertebrates. However, Septencoracias probably mostly fed on insects and small land vertebrates, similar to its modern relatives, given that it was a terrestrial bird.

Septencoracias was found in the Eastern Hemisphere, which is where all modern rollers are found, though they all occur in modern tropical and subtropical regions. Given the warmer climate of the Eocene, the finding of Septencoracias in Denmark indicates that the range of early Coraciiformes was much wider within the Northern Hemisphere during this time, due to the increased number of suitable habitats. As the globe cooled, the range of rollers was thus reduced to their present ranges. This was part of a much broader trend in which many modern bird clades that were formerly found in higher latitudes during the Eocene are now restricted to the tropics and subtropics from cooling climates.
