= Striolated puffbird =

Striolated puffbird is the common name used for a broad species concept of Nystalus striolatus. This taxon is now typically treated as two separate species:

- Eastern striolated puffbird
- Western striolated puffbird
