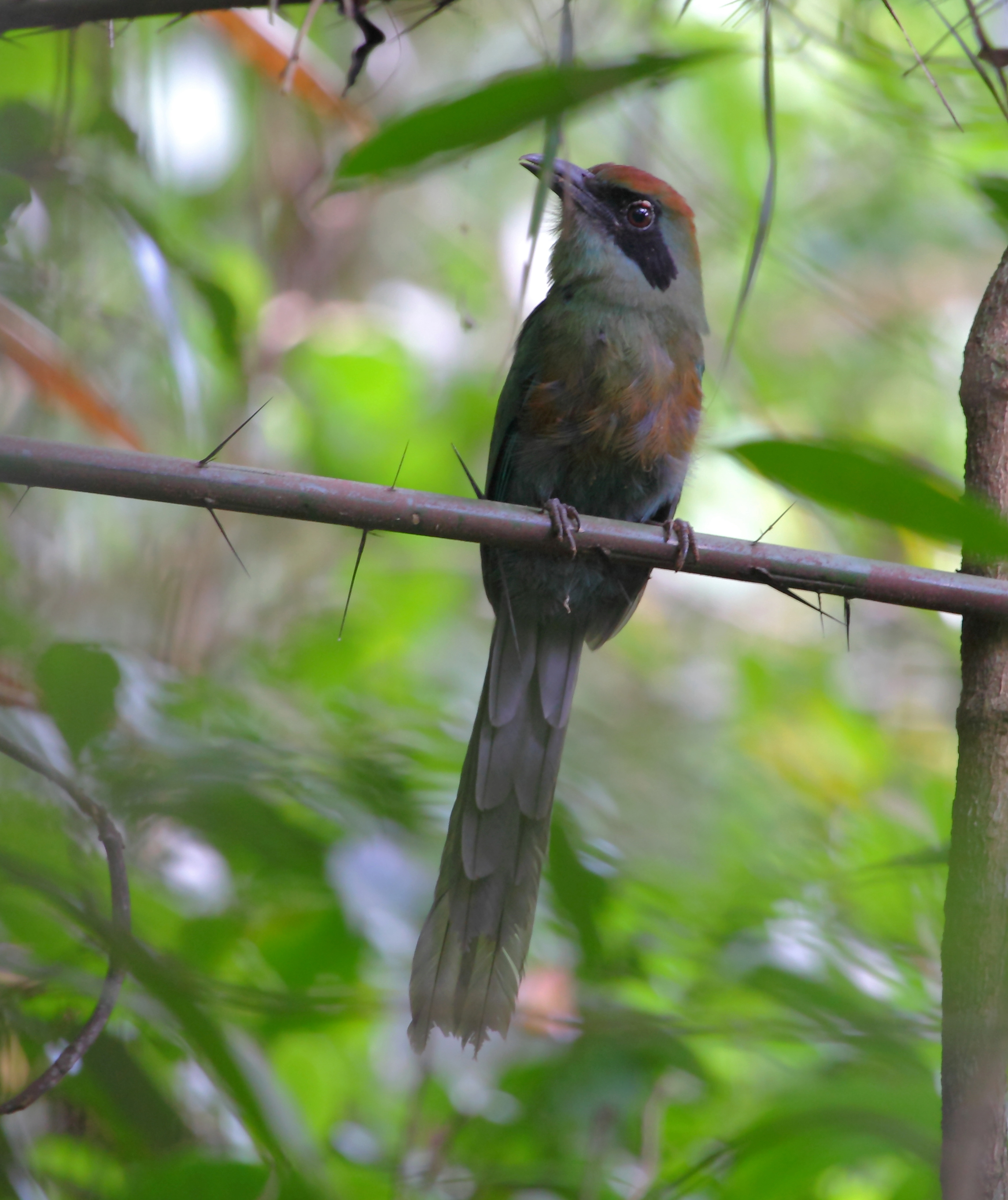
- In Serra do Mar State Park, São Paulo State, Brazil

Conservation status
- Least Concern (IUCN 3.1)

Scientific classification
- Kingdom: Animalia
- Phylum: Chordata
- Class: Aves
- Order: Coraciiformes
- Family: Momotidae
- Genus: Baryphthengus
- Species: B. ruficapillus

Binomial name
- Baryphthengus ruficapillus (Vieillot, 1818)

= Rufous-capped motmot =

Species of bird

The rufous-capped motmot (Baryphthengus ruficapillus) is a species of bird in the family Momotidae. It is found in Argentina, Brazil, and Paraguay.

== Taxonomy and systematics ==
The rufous-capped motmot and rufous motmot (Baryphtengus martii) are the only two species in their genus, and have sometimes been treated as conspecific. The rufous-capped motmot is monotypic. Though subspecies have been proposed within its Brazilian population, the differences have been shown to be simply individual variation.

== Description ==
The rufous-capped motmot is 42 cm (17 in) long and weighs 140 to 151 g (4.9 to 5.3 oz). The adults are mostly green above and olive-green below. The crown and nape are rufous and a black "mask" has a turquoise border. The chest has a black spot, there is a rufous band across the belly, and the lower belly is blue-green. The juvenile is similarly colored but duller.

== Distribution and habitat ==
The rufous-capped motmot is found across southeastern Brazil, in eastern Paraguay, and in far northeastern Argentina. It inhabits primary and gallery forest, the latter mostly along watercourses. It ranges in elevation from near sea level to 1,200 m (3,900 ft).

== Behavior ==
=== Feeding ===
The rufous-capped motmot's diet is cosmopolitan. It includes insects and their larvae; spiders; snails; small reptiles, mammals, and birds; and to a lesser degree fruits. The species has been observed following army ants to capture what they disturb and also sometimes forages in mixed-species flocks.

=== Breeding ===
The rufous-capped motmot nests in a burrow in an earth bank; it either digs its own or uses an abandoned burrow dug by another animal such as an armadillo. The burrow can be more than 1 m (3.3 ft) long. The species lays two or three eggs, probably in September and October based on when nestlings and young have been observed. Both sexes feed the young.

=== Vocalization ===
The rufous-capped motmot vocalizes mostly before dawn and at dusk. Its makes a "series of 'hoo-oo-oo-oo-oo' notes" that have been compared to owl calls .

== Status ==
The IUCN has assessed the rufous-capped motmot as being of Least Concern. Though it has a large range, appears to have a large population, and occurs in many protected areas, deforestation elsewhere is causing its population to decline.
