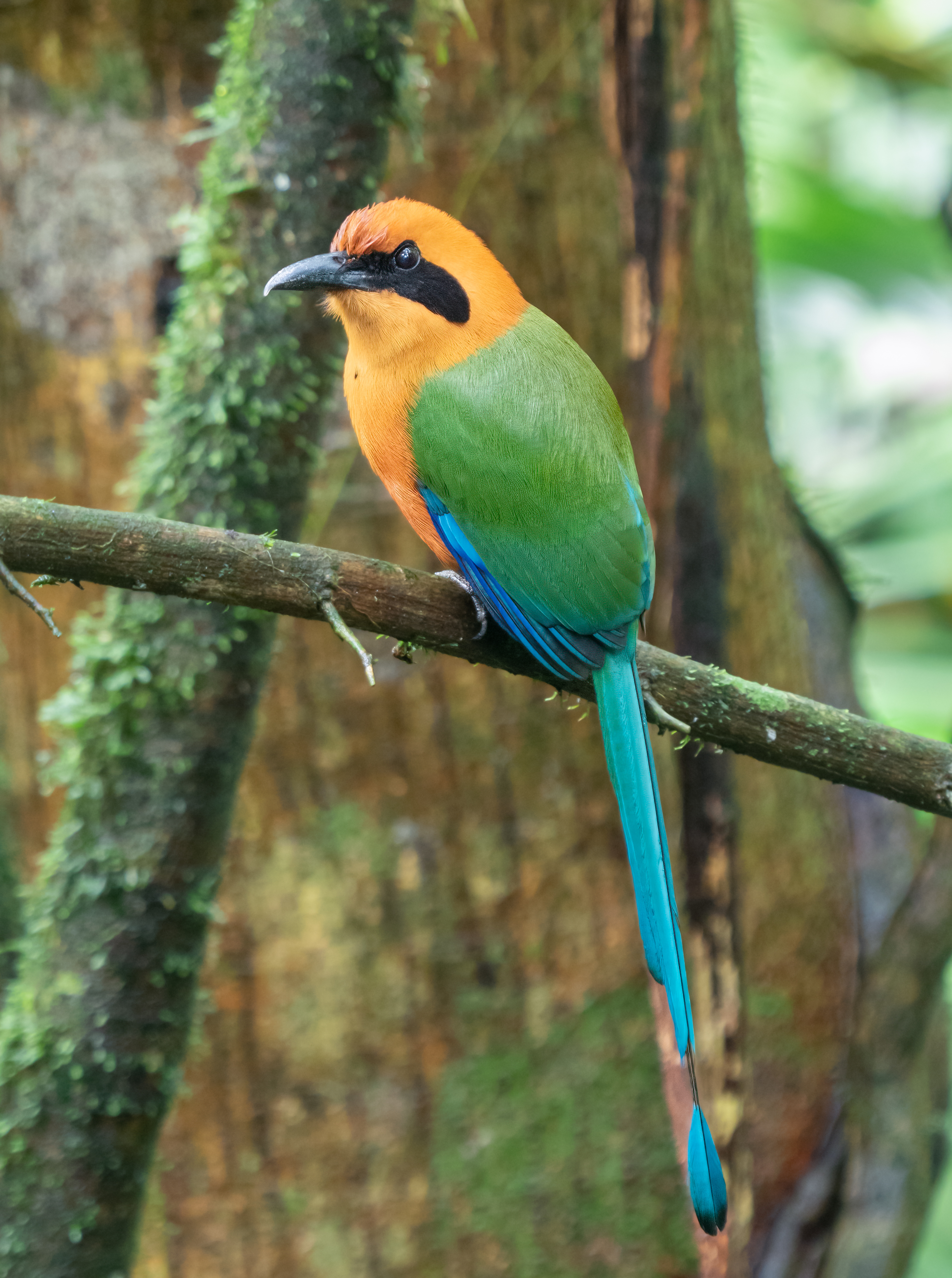

Conservation status
- Least Concern (IUCN 3.1)

Scientific classification
- Kingdom: Animalia
- Phylum: Chordata
- Class: Aves
- Order: Coraciiformes
- Family: Momotidae
- Genus: Baryphthengus
- Species: B. martii

Binomial name
- Baryphthengus martii (Spix, 1824)
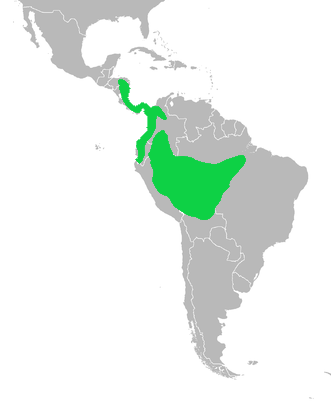

Audio

= Rufous motmot =

Species of bird

The rufous motmot (Baryphthengus martii) is a bird in the family Momotidae. It is found from northeastern Honduras south to western Ecuador, northern Bolivia, and western Brazil.

== Taxonomy and systematics ==
The rufous motmot and rufous-capped motmot (Baryphtengus ruficapillus) are the only two species in their genus, and have sometimes been treated as conspecific and apparently form a superspecies. The rufous motmot has two recognized subspecies, the nominate Baryphthengus martii martii and B. m. semirufus. In the early 20th century, B. m. martii was classified in its own genus, Urospatha. Later, the Nicaraguan and Costa Rican populations were considered to be a third subspecies, B. m. costaricensis, but it was decided they were part of B. m. semirufus. The binomial commemorates the German botanist and explorer Carl Friedrich Philipp von Martius.

== Description ==
The rufous motmot is the second-largest member of its family. The male of the nominate subspecies is 42 to 47 cm (17 to 19 in) long and weighs 146 to 160 g (5.1 to 5.6 oz). The female weighs 153 to 173 g (5.4 to 6.1 oz). Male and female B. m. semirufus weigh 185 to 193 g (6.5 to 6.8 oz) and 170 to 208 g (6.0 to 7.3 oz) respectively. Adults are mainly cinnamon-rufous, with a black face mask and central breast spot, green wings and sides, a greenish-blue lower belly, and dark blue tail and flight feathers. The tail is very long, and that of B. m. semirufus but not the nominate has a bare-shafted racket tip. The bill and legs are black. Young birds are paler and duller than adults, and lack the tail rackets and black breast spot.

== Distribution and habitat ==
The nominate subspecies of rufous motmot occurs in the western Amazon Basin in southeastern Colombia through eastern Ecuador and Peru to northern Bolivia, and east into western Brazil. The range of B. m. semirufus is separate from that of the nominate. It occurs from eastern Honduras through the Caribbean slopes of Nicaragua, Costa Rica, and Panama, and continues on the Pacific slope of Panama into northwestern Colombia and western Ecuador. In elevation it ranges from near sea level to 1,250 m (4,100 ft) in Costa Rica and to 1,400 m (4,600 ft) in Panama and Ecuador. In Peru it can be found locally to 1,600 m (5,200 ft) but more generally to 1,300 m (4,300 ft).

The rufous motmot inhabits humid lowland evergreen primary forest and also secondary forest. It prefers tall forest, especially along rivers and streams, but avoids dense foliage.

== Behavior ==
=== Feeding ===
The rufous motmot is omnivorous. It has been documented eating many types of fruit, adult insects and their larva, arachnids including crustaceans, and small fish, lizards, and frogs.

=== Breeding ===
The rufous motmot's breeding and nesting phenology has few reported details. It is assumed to nest in deep burrows in earthen banks like other motmots. The clutch size and eggs are undescribed.

=== Vocalization ===
The rufous motmot's song has been described as "hoos, hoots, or hoops". It is sometimes answered by a low owl-like hoop hoop huhuhuhuhuhu. An agitation call is a dry chatter.

== Status ==
The IUCN has assessed the rufous motmot as being of Least Concern.

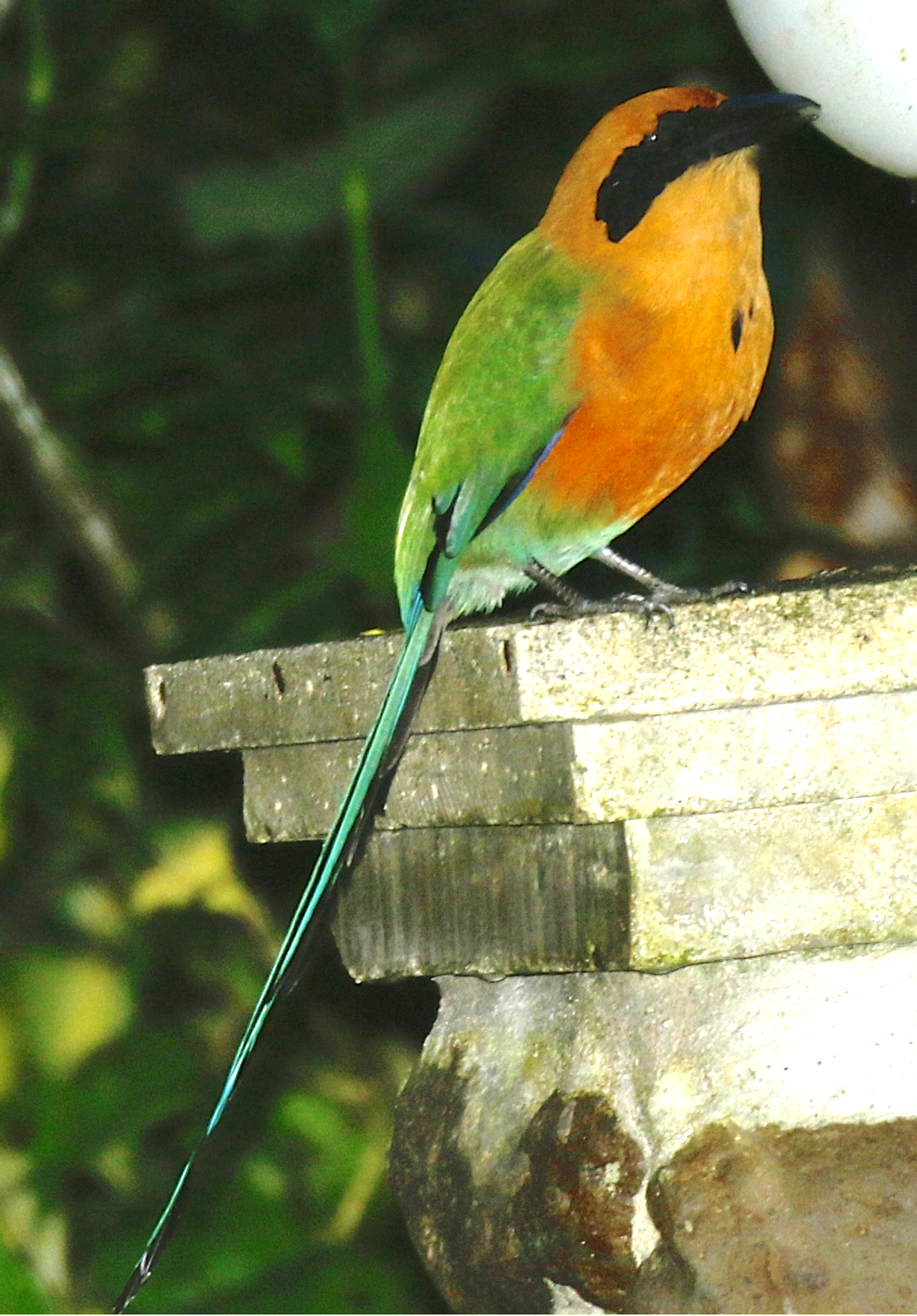
Canopy Lodge - El Valle, Panama (flash photo)
