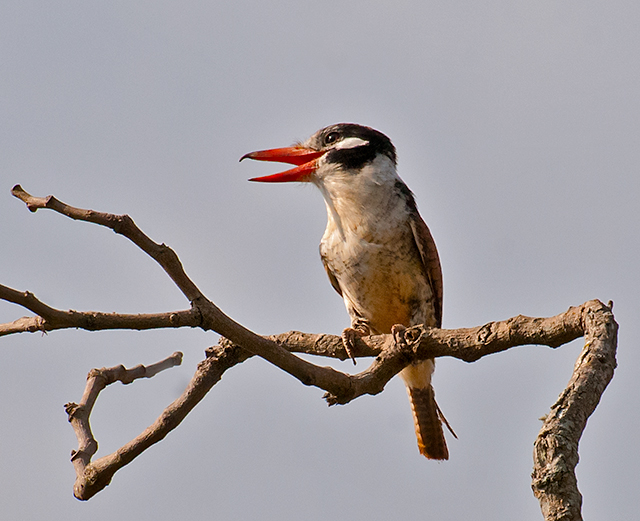
- White-eared puffbird at Extrema, Minas Gerais State, Brazil

Conservation status
- Least Concern (IUCN 3.1)

Scientific classification
- Kingdom: Animalia
- Phylum: Chordata
- Class: Aves
- Order: Piciformes
- Family: Bucconidae
- Genus: Nystalus
- Species: N. chacuru

Binomial name
- Nystalus chacuru (Vieillot, 1816)

= White-eared puffbird =

Species of bird

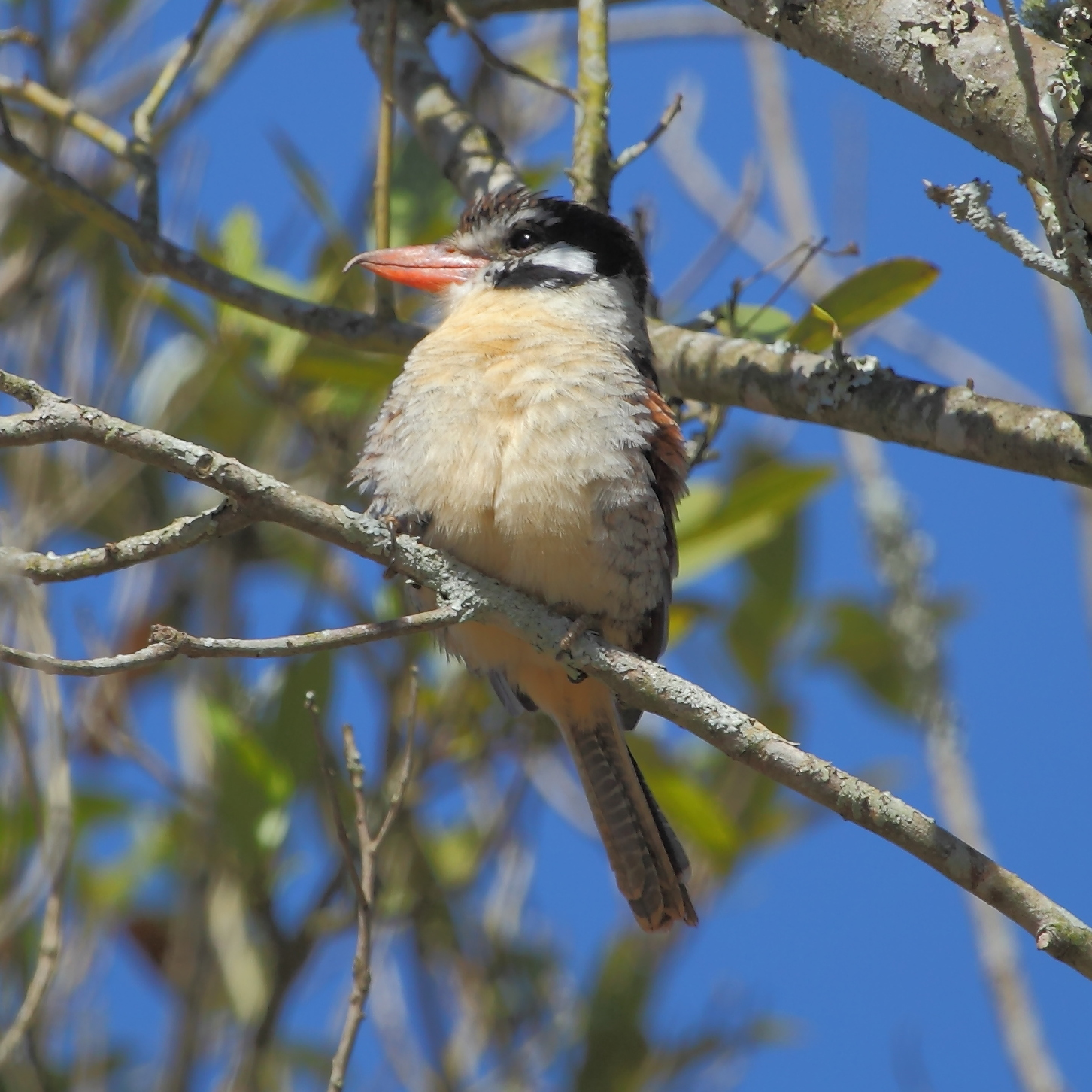
White-eared Puffbird at Jacutinga, Minas Gerais, Brazil

The white-eared puffbird (Nystalus chacuru) is a species of bird in the Bucconidae family, the puffbirds. It is found in Argentina, Bolivia, Brazil, Paraguay and Peru, where it inhabits tropical and subtropical dry forests, subtropical and tropical moist forests, gallery forests, tropical savanna, and heavily degraded former forest.

== Description ==
Like some other puffbirds, the white-eared puffbird is a round, plump bird with a very narrow tail. The head is relatively large, with a dark brown barred crown, and an orange, black-tipped bill. The sit-and-wait feeding strategy, for insects or opportunistic prey, may explain this body shape.

The bird has a medium-brown back and wings, with dark rufous speckles and bars; white and black flecked on the breast. The upper breast is white, extending to a narrow-to-medium white collar around the neck. There is a distinctive, medium-sized white ear patch, which gives the species its common name, and that is surrounded by a dark ear patch. It has a medium-sized tail in dark brown and slightly graduated, with narrow, widely spaced buffy bars, and a pale tip. It measures about 21–22 cm (8.3–8.7 in) in length and weighs between 48–64 g.

== Distribution ==
The white-eared puffbird can be found from eastern Peru and central Brazil south to Paraguay, Bolivia and northeastern Argentina.

In south-eastern Brazil, it is centered on the Cerrado region, and on the southeast Atlantic coast from northern Bahia state south to the Paraná–Santa Catarina state borders. It covers much of the eastern and northern Pantanal, and southern areas of the Caatinga.

The north and west parts of its range include the upstream headwaters of some Amazon Basin river systems, encompassing nearly all of northern Bolivia, the Madeira River's many headwater tributaries, and the extreme headwaters of the Tapajós River. East of the Tapajós, the range expands into the Cerrado, the upper half of the Xingu River drainage, and the entire drainage system of the Araguaia-Tocantins River (the eastward system, generally considered part of the Amazon Basin).

In Peru, the species is rare but local, found on the very western border region of Bolivia and in some localities in north-central Peru. In this region, it favors the dry forests and scrub found in parts of the Valleys of Mantaro, Apurimac and Urubamba at altitudes between 1000 and 2200 m. It was also recorded in the Mayo Valley.

Another second locale is mid-river on the downstream Madeira River in southern Amazon Basin Amazonas state.

== Diet ==
The white-eared puffbird feeds on arthropods, and small vertebrates, such as lizards, amphibians (including poisonous frogs) and even small marsupials, commonly taken from the ground. Its diet appears to be opportunistic. Invertebrate prey includes social wasps (Vespidae), beetles, homopterans, lepidopterans and other large insects caught in mid-air, often along streams, but also non-volant animals such as insect larvae, millipedes, centipedes, scorpions, and even velvet worms and crabs.

== Subspecies ==
Two subspecies are recognized:

- Nystalus chacuru uncirostris - found in eastern Peru, northeastern Bolivia and adjacent Brazil.
- Nystalus chacuru chacuru - found in northeastern, eastern and southern Brazil, eastern Paraguay and northeastern Argentina (Misiones).
