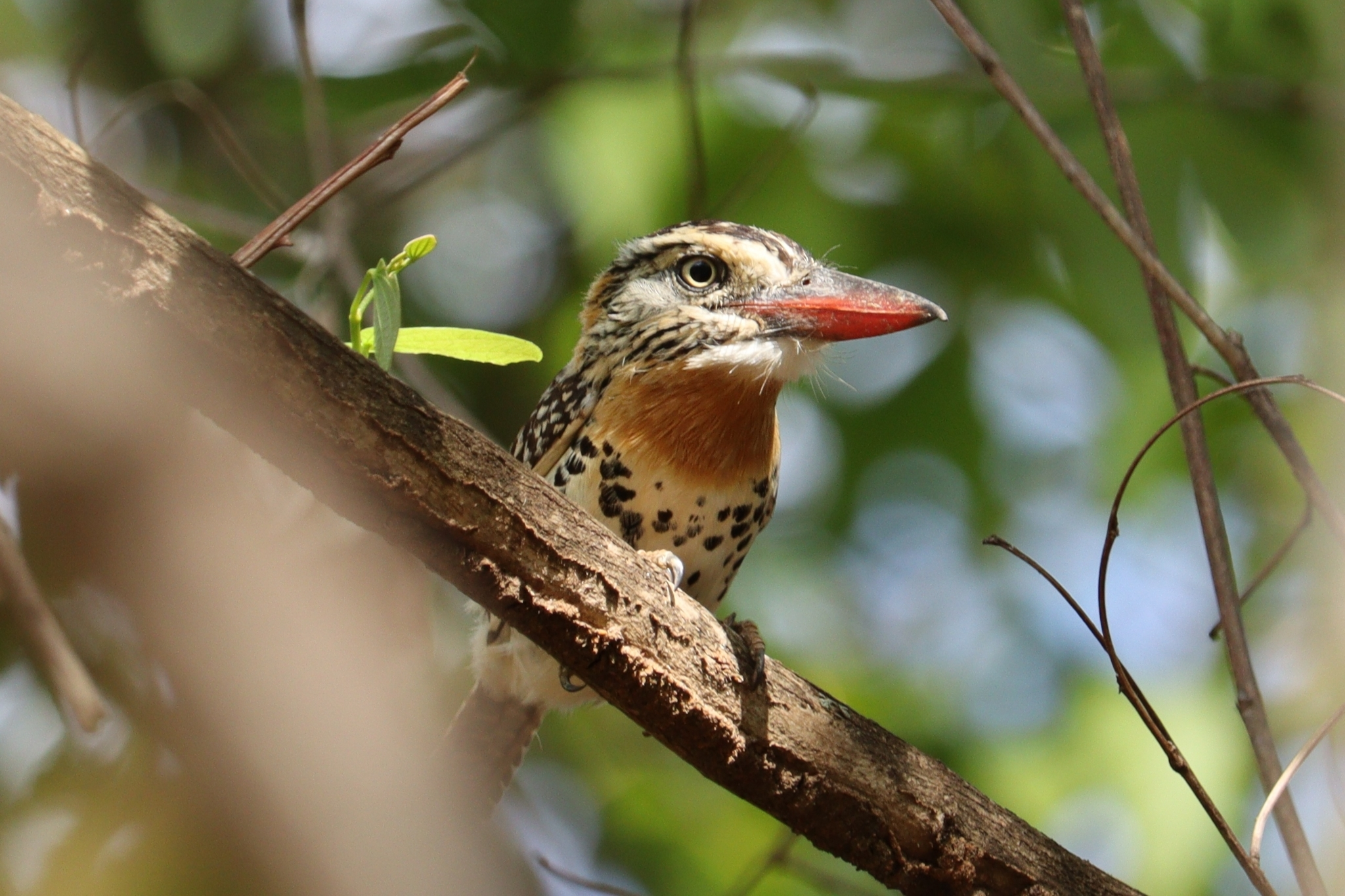
- N. m. maculatus

Conservation status
- Least Concern (IUCN 3.1)

Scientific classification
- Kingdom: Animalia
- Phylum: Chordata
- Class: Aves
- Order: Piciformes
- Family: Bucconidae
- Genus: Nystalus
- Species: N. maculatus

Binomial name
- Nystalus maculatus (Gmelin, JF, 1788)

Synonyms
- Alcedo maculata (protonym)

= Spot-backed puffbird =

Species of bird

The spot-backed puffbird (Nystalus maculatus) is a species of bird in the family Bucconidae, the puffbirds, nunlets, and nunbirds. It is found in South America from northeastern Brazil to northwestern Argentina. The spot-backed puffbird has sometimes been split into two species, the Caatinga puffbird and the Chaco puffbird.

== Taxonomy and systematics ==
The spot-backed puffbird was described in 1648 by the German naturalist Georg Marcgrave in his Historia Naturalis Brasiliae. In his Latin text Marcgrave used the name Matuitui which was the local name for the bird in the Tupi language. A series of later ornithologists based their own descriptions on that by Marcgrave. These include Francis Willughby in 1678, John Ray in 1713, Mathurin Brisson in 1760, the Comte de Buffon in 1780, and John Latham in 1782.

When the German naturalist Johann Friedrich Gmelin revised and expanded Carl Linnaeus's Systema Naturae in 1788 he included the spot-backed puffbird and cited descriptions by earlier ornithologists. He placed it with the kingfishers in the genus Alcedo and coined the binomial name Alcedo maculata. The specific epithet is Latin and means "spotted" or "blotched". In 1807 the spot-backed puffbird was accurately described and illustrated from a specimen in the Paris museum by the French naturalist François Levaillant. The spot-backed puffbird is now one of five species placed in the genus Nystalus that was introduced in 1863 by Jean Cabanis and Ferdinand Heine.

Two subspecies are recognised:

- N. m. maculatus (Gmelin, JF, 1788) – northeast, central Brazil
- N. m. striatipectus (Sclater, PL, 1854) – east Bolivia to central south Brazil, south through west Paraguay to central Argentina

The spot-backed puffbird has sometimes been split into two species with the subspecies N. m. maculatus known as the Caatinga puffbird and the subspecies N. m. striatipectus known as the Chaco puffbird.

== Description ==
The spot-backed puffbird is 18 to 19 cm (7.1 to 7.5 in) long and weighs 32 to 38 g (1.1 to 1.3 oz). It has a dark brown crown with bold buffy spangles and a pale rufous collar on the hindneck. Its upperparts and wing coverts are dark brown with buffy spangles and bars. The long, narrow, tail has broad black and narrow buffy bars. The face is mostly off-white with dusky streaks that are darker to the rear; it has a buffy supercilium. The chin is white and the throat, upper breast, and sides of the neck are orange-red. The rest of the underparts are white with bold black spots on the upper breast and black streaks on the flanks. The bill is mostly red, the eye pale yellow, and the feet brownish olive.

The song is an "[u]ndulating 'tewre-tewtewretewtewre'", often sung as a duet or by three birds.

== Distribution and habitat ==
The spot-backed puffbirdis found in northeastern and central Brazil, as far south northwestern Argentina. It is a bird of the lowland and foothill cerrado, caatinga, and campo regions. It inhabits a variety of semi-open landscapes including the interior and edges of deciduous woodland, savanna, palm groves, shrub- and scrublands, and pastures. It is thought to be resident year-round, though there might be some seasonal wandering in parts of its range.

== Behavior ==
=== Feeding ===
The spot-backed puffbird hunts by sallying from a low perch to capture prey on the ground or foliage. Its diet is mostly insects including caterpillars.

=== Breeding ===
The spot-backed puffbird's breeding phenology has not been fully documented. It nests in a leaf-lined cavity in a soil bank or level ground. The clutch size is two or three eggs.

== Status ==
The IUCN assesses the spot-backed puffbirdas being of Least Concern. It has a very large range and although its population has not been quantified, it is believed to be stable. It appears to be common throughout its range.

== Gallery ==
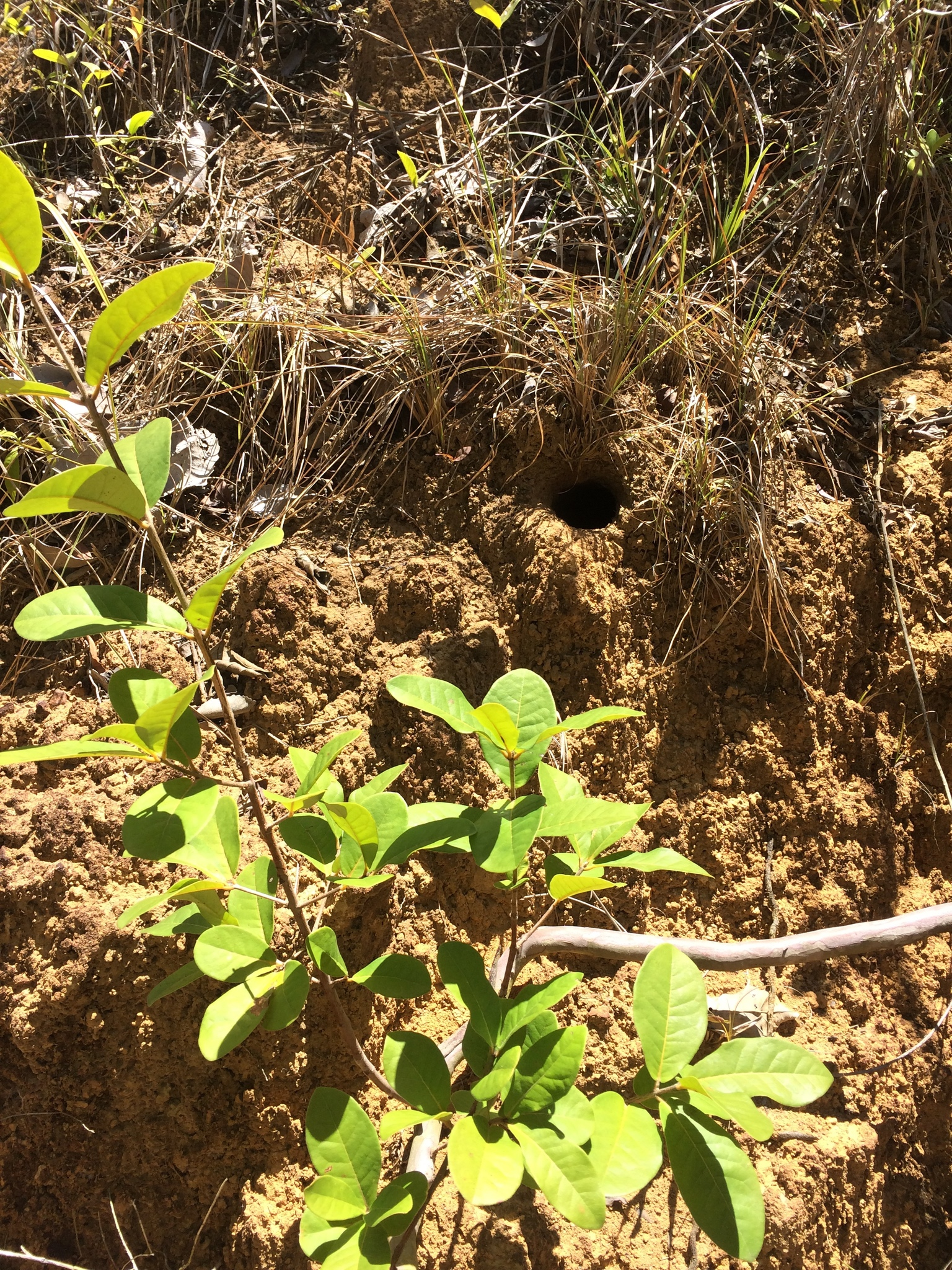
Caatinga puffbird nest opening

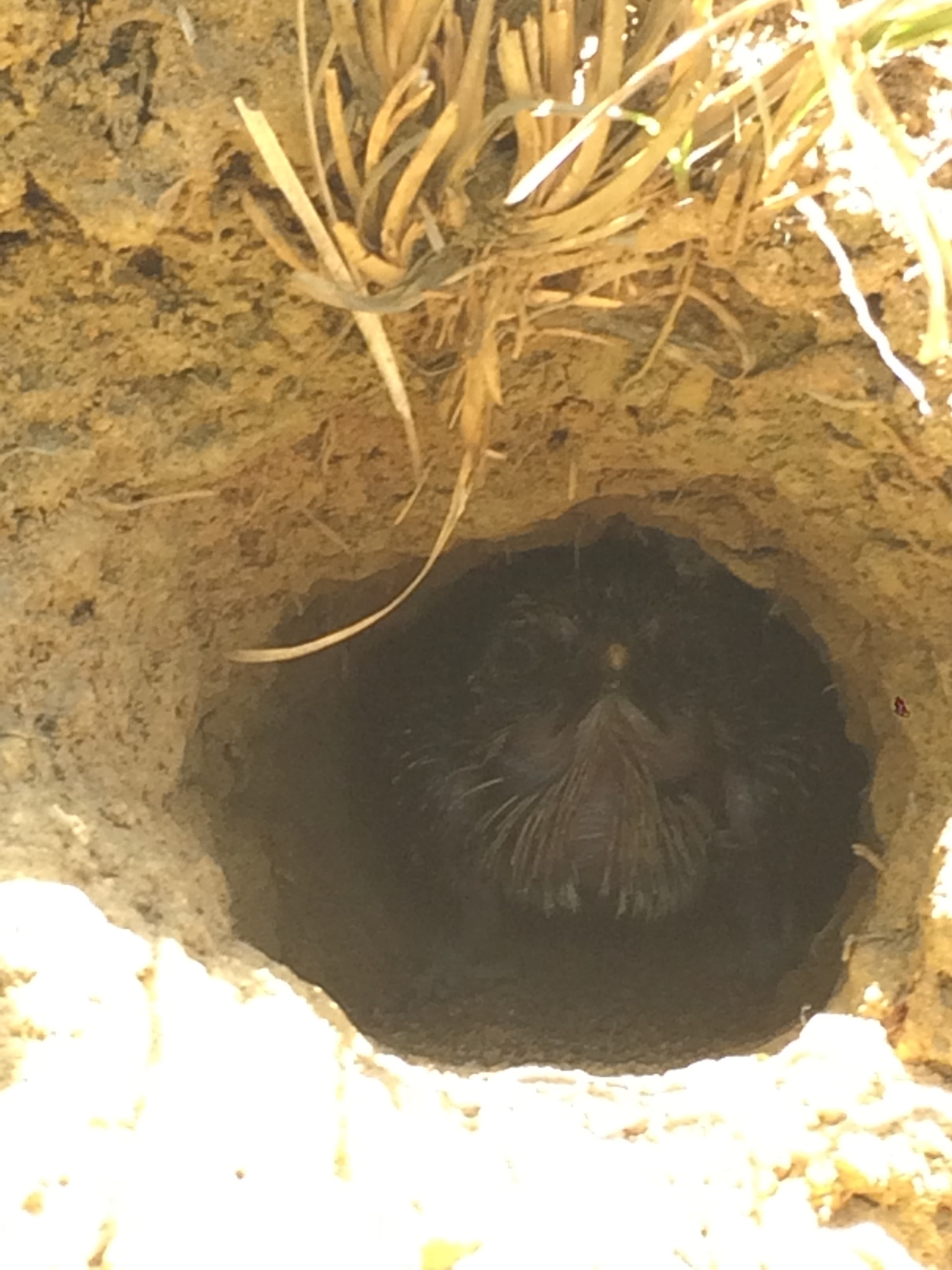
Caatinga puffbird nest

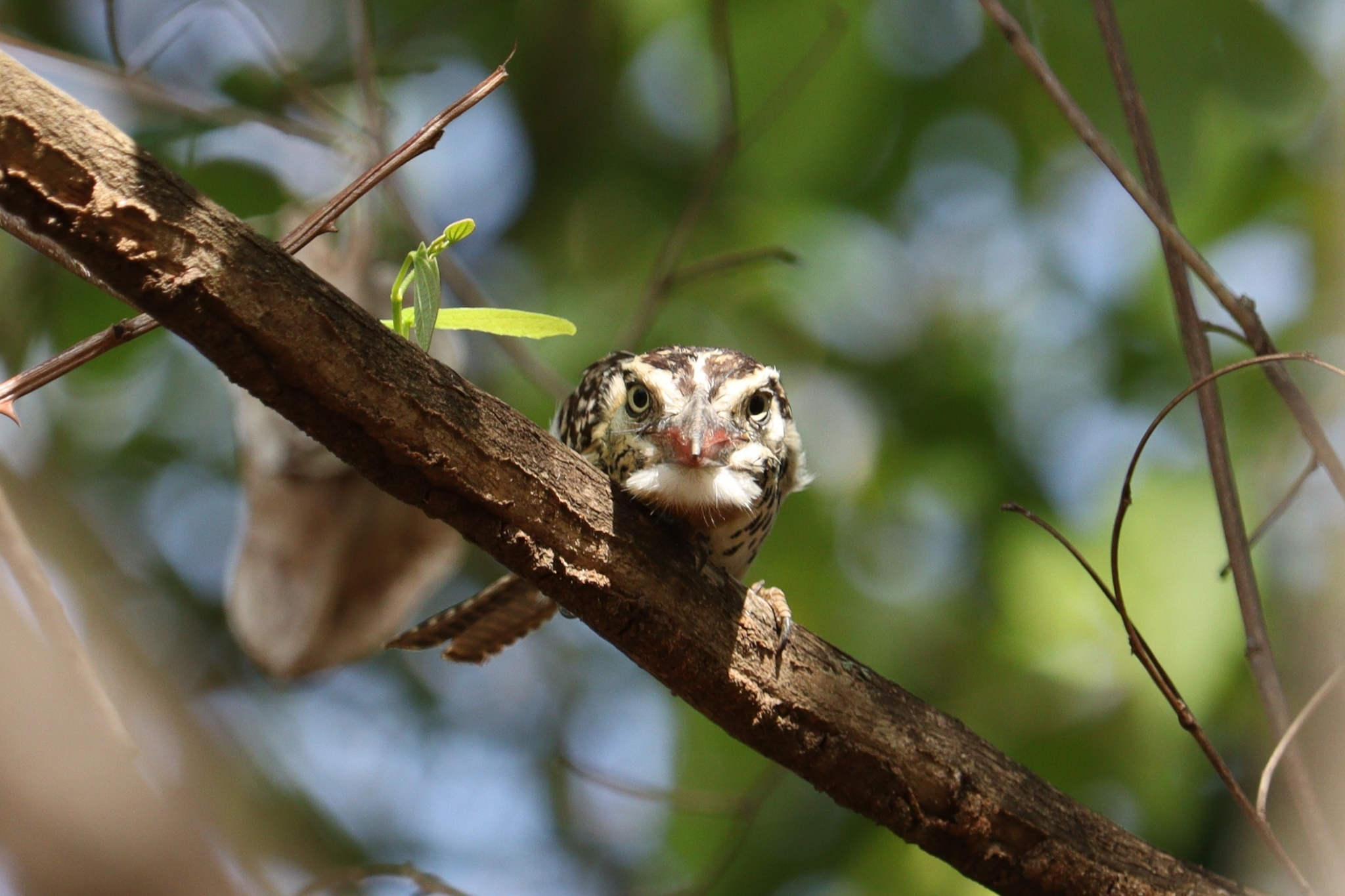
Caatinga puffbird
