= Neanis =

Neanis Temporal range: Early Eocene

Scientific classification
- Kingdom: Animalia
- Phylum: Chordata
- Class: Aves
- Clade: Picodynastornithes
- Order: Piciformes (?)
- Genus: †Neanis; Shufeldt, 1913

Species
- Neanis schucherti (type) "Neanis" kistneri (see text)

Extinct genus of birds

Neanis is an extinct genus of bird probably related to woodpeckers and toucans. It contains at least one species, N. schucherti; N. kistneri resembles this, but it probably belongs to a distinct genus and may not be closely related. Both are known from the Late Wasatchian (51-52 MYA) stratum of the Early Eocene Green River Formation of the Western-Central USA. "N." kistneri is known from one fairly complete, but not very well preserved skeleton, whereas of N. schucherti even less material was found.

The systematic assignment of the genus (apart from the problems posed by "N." kistneri) is not well resolved. Initially, the genus (at that time only comprising the type species) was considered to be a passeriform. "N." kistneri was described 60 years later as a species of the genus Primobucco, which then thought to be related to woodpeckers because it had a zygodactyl foot or at least could turn the outer toe backwards; some years later, several genera (including Primobucco and Neanis) were put into a new family, the Primobucconidae, which were thought to be a primitive kind of puffbird.

However, it is now known that the primobucconids as originally defined were a paraphyletic assemblage including taxa as diverse as Coliiformes and Coraciiformes. Indeed, the only remaining genus of the family is Primobucco (without kistneri), and the family as such has been moved to the Coraciiformes. The closest relatives of Neanis schucherti may be the Piciformes, or it might be an ancestral form in the piciform-coraciiform radiation. "N." kistneri seems more closely related to piciform birds. Neanis schucherti appears to share some traits with Hassiavis and might even be a cypselomorph
