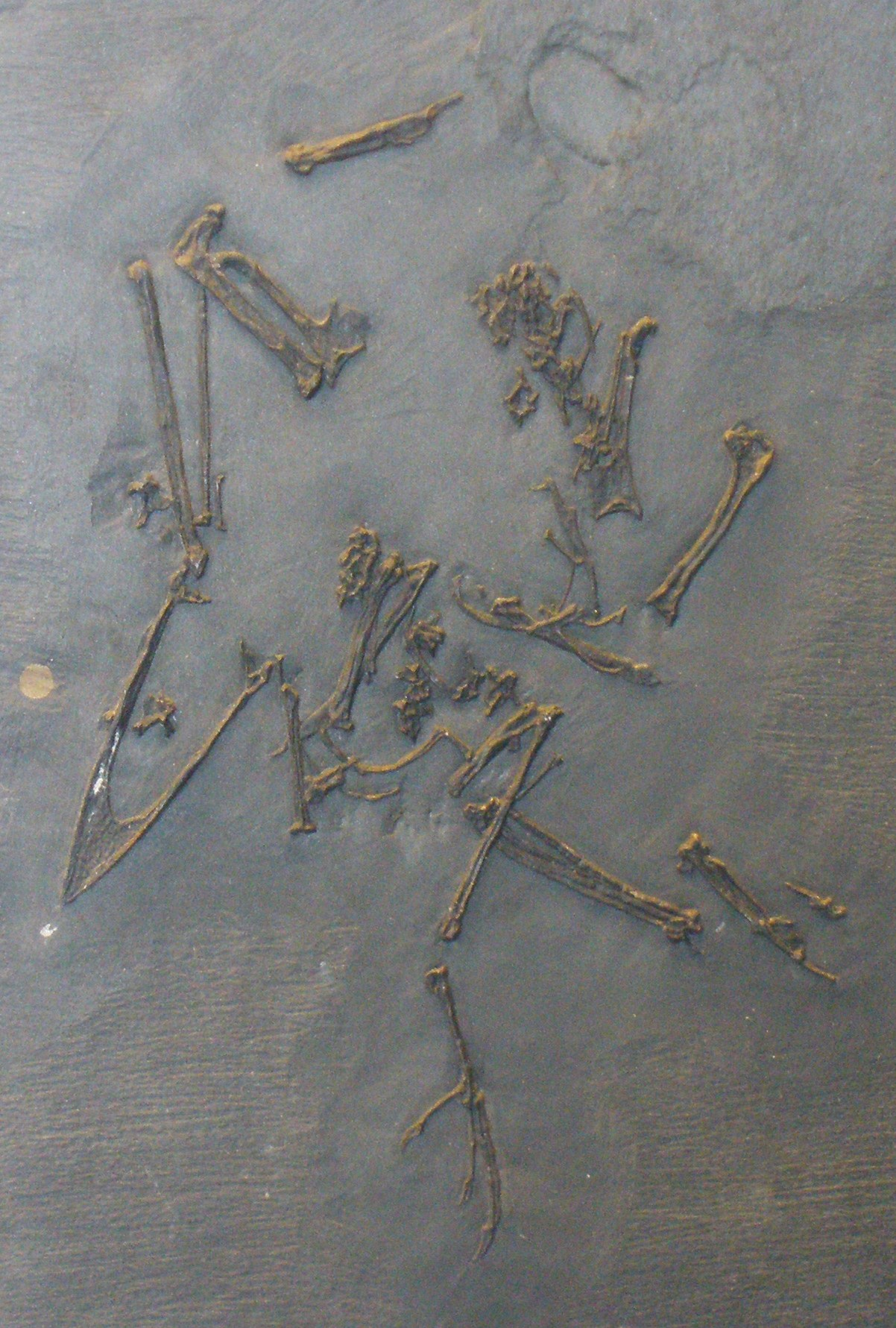
- Fossil specimen

Scientific classification
- Kingdom: Animalia
- Phylum: Chordata
- Class: Aves
- Order: Coraciiformes
- Genus: †Protornis von Meyer, 1844
- Species: †P. glarniensis

Binomial name
- †Protornis glarniensis von Meyer, 1844

= Protornis =

Protornis Temporal range: Early Oligocene, Rupelian

Extinct genus of birds

Protornis (Greek for "original bird") is an extinct genus of prehistoric coraciiform bird. It contains one species, P. glarniensis from the Early Oligocene-aged Matt Formation of Canton Glarus, Switzerland. It is known from a partially complete but poorly-preserved fossil skeleton known from the famous "Glarus Fish Slates". Its name derives from the fact that at the time of discovery, it was considered one of the oldest fossil birds, as the rocks in which it was found were thought to date to the Cretaceous, although they are now known to date to only the Early Oligocene.

It was initially described as a passeriform by von Meyer (1844) due to its small size, but Olson (1976) reclassified it as an early motmot, noting several close similarities of its skeleton to extant Momotidae, including its rather flattened bill. However, more recent studies have noted that it as some traits not present in motmots either, so it is now considered an indeterminate coraciiform.

Protornis was a small-sized bird, only slightly larger than the modern tody motmot. A second partial fossil bird specimen from the same deposits was previously thought to be a second Protornis specimen, but later analyses found it to be too large and to have significant morphological differences from Protornis. This bird is now considered an indeterminate trogon.

The genus name "Protornis", despite being preoccupied by this genus, was also used for an ichnogenus of animal tracks that was interpreted as representing early bird footprints, such as Protornis bavarica from the Jurassic of Germany, thought to represent Archaeopteryx footprints. However, these tracks are now known to have actually been made by horseshoe crabs, and are now assigned to the genus Kouphichnium.
