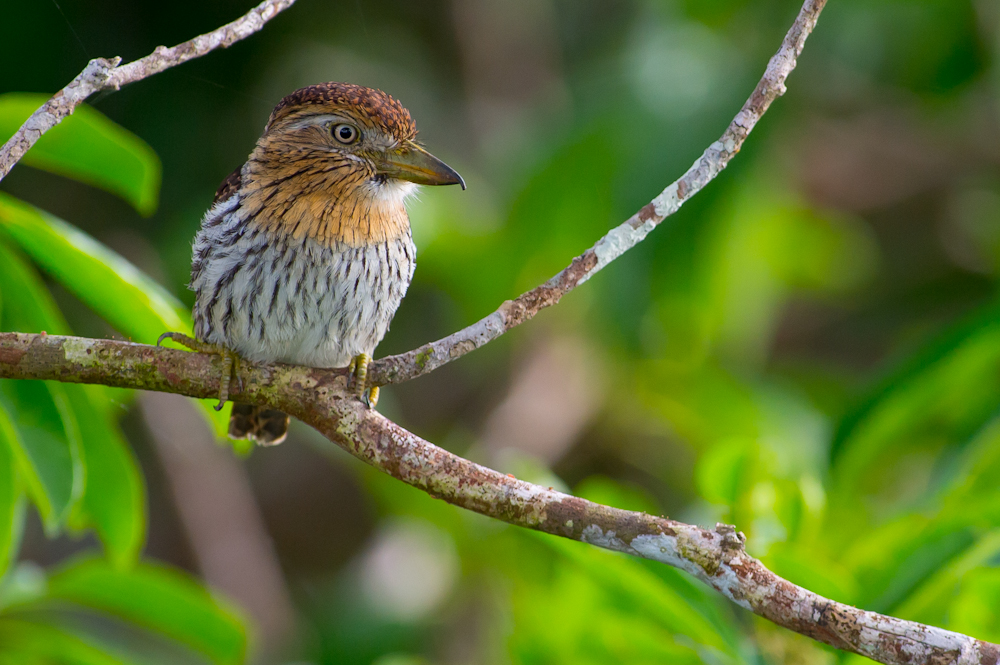

Scientific classification
- Kingdom: Animalia
- Phylum: Chordata
- Class: Aves
- Order: Piciformes
- Family: Bucconidae
- Genus: Nystalus
- Species: N. obamai

Binomial name
- Nystalus obamai Whitney, Piacentini, Schunck, Aleixo, de Sousa, BRS, Silveira & Rêgo, MA, 2013

= Western striolated puffbird =

Species of bird from South America named after Barack Obama

The western striolated puffbird (Nystalus obamai) is a species of bird in the family Bucconidae, the puffbirds, nunlets, and nunbirds. It is found in Bolivia, Brazil, Colombia, Ecuador, and Peru.

== Taxonomy and systematics ==
The International Ornithological Committee (IOC), the South American Classification Committee of the American Ornithological Society (SACC), and the Clements taxonomy treat the western striolated puffbird as a species. According to them, the original striolated puffbird (Nystalus striolatus) was found to include a previously undefined species that is now the western striolated puffbird; it had not been recognized even as a subspecies. N. striolatus was renamed "eastern striolated puffbird" after the split. However, BirdLife International's Handbook of the Birds of the World (HBW) retains the English name "striolated puffbird" for N. striolatus and assigns N. s. striolatus, N. s. obamai, and N. s. torridus as subspecies of it.

The western striolated puffbird's specific epithet honors former U.S. president Barack Obama.

The western striolated puffbird is monotypic.

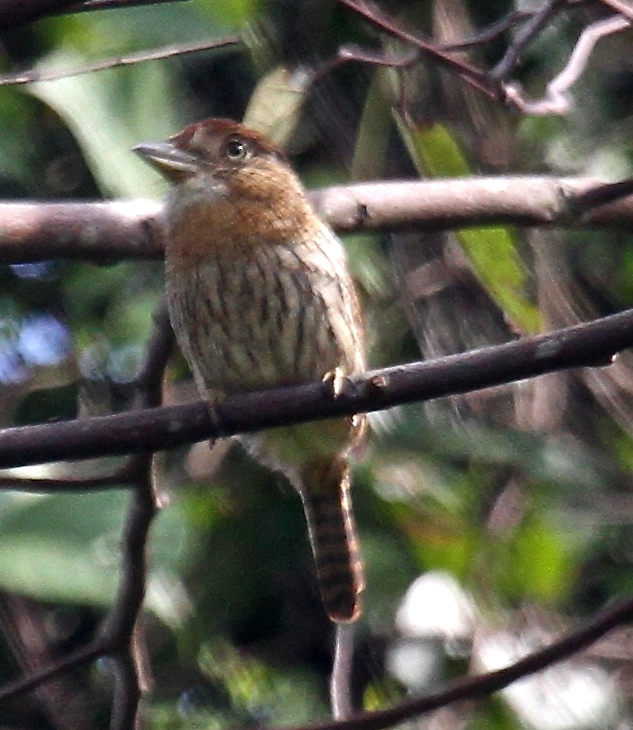
Amazonia Lodge - Peru

== Description ==
The western striolated puffbird is 19.8 to 21 cm (7.8 to 8.3 in) long and weighs 43 to 47 g (1.5 to 1.7 oz). Its crown is dark brown with rufous spots and bars, blackish toward the rear. Its hindneck has a broad buffy collar. Below that is a blackish band and the rest of the upperparts are dark brown with reddish buff spots and (at the rear) bars. The tail is narrow and blackish brown with thin rufous bars. The face has a white spot in front of the eye; the rest of the face is buffy with fine dusky streaks. The chin and upper throat are white; the lower throat is ochracous with fine blackish streaks that gets lighter through the belly to the rump with heavier stripes. The center of the belly is whiter and unstreaked. The bill is mostly yellow-oive, the eye pale ochre, the legs brown, and the feet dusky yellow-olive.

== Distribution and habitat ==
The western striolated puffbird is found in the western Amazon Basin, from southern Colombia south through central Ecuador and central and eastern Peru into central Bolivia and east into Brazil south of the Amazon River to the Madeira River. The species inhabits a variety of landscapes including the edges of humid tropical, terra firme, and swamp forests, and also transitional forest. It tends to stay in the subcanopy or canopy. In elevation it occurs as high as 1,325 m (4,300 ft) in Colombia, 1,700 m (5,600 ft) in Ecuador, 1,200 m (3,900 ft) in Peru, and 1,850 m (6,100 ft) in Bolivia. The species is not known to migrate.

== Behavior ==
=== Feeding ===
The western striolated puffbird hunts by sallying from a perch in the canopy or subcanopy. Its prey, large arthropods or small vertebrates such as lizards, is taken to the perch and beaten again it.

=== Breeding ===
Western striolated puffbird breeding activity has been noted during September in Peru and October in Colombia. The nest is in a cavity at the end of a tunnel excavated in an earthen or sandy bank. The clutch size is not conclusively known, but is believed to be three or four eggs.

=== Vocalization ===
The western striolated puffbird's song is "a soft, sad whistle, whip, whi-wheeu, wheeeeeuu, with [a] distinctive cadence, first rising, then falling after short pause." The song is typically given shortly after dawn or just before dusk. Often the male sings first and is quickly followed by the female at a slightly lower pitch.

== Status ==
The IUCN follows HBW in treating the striolated puffbird as a single species; it is assessed as being of Least Concern. Taken as a whole, it has a very large range. Its population has not been quantified and is believed to be decreasing. It is considered rare to locally common throughout it range.

== See also ==
- List of things named after Barack Obama
- List of organisms named after famous people (born 1950–1974)
