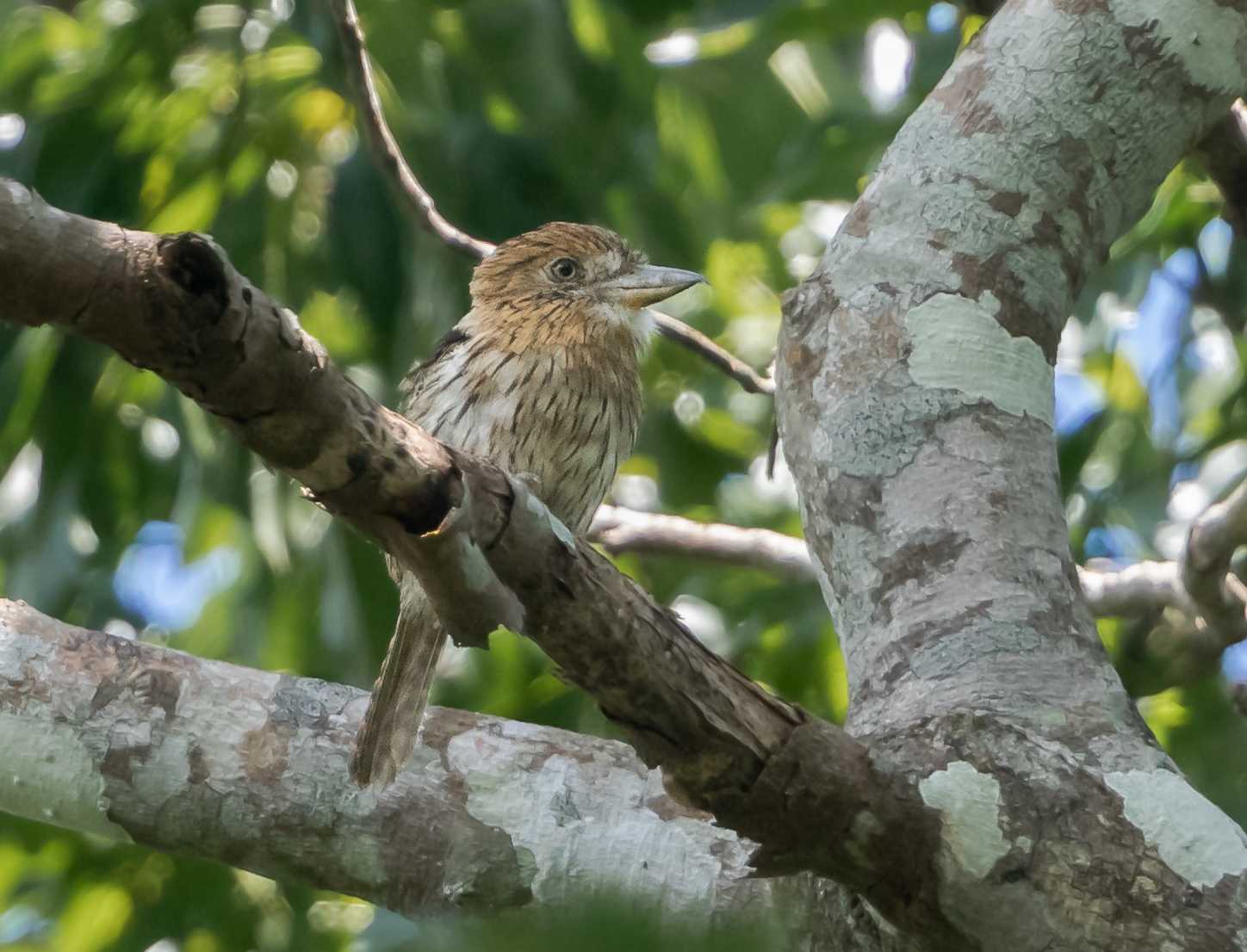

Conservation status
- Least Concern (IUCN 3.1)

Scientific classification
- Kingdom: Animalia
- Phylum: Chordata
- Class: Aves
- Order: Piciformes
- Family: Bucconidae
- Genus: Nystalus
- Species: N. striolatus

Binomial name
- Nystalus striolatus (Pelzeln, 1856)

= Eastern striolated puffbird =

Species of bird

The eastern striolated puffbird (Nystalus striolatus) is a species of bird in the family Bucconidae, the puffbirds, nunlets, and nunbirds. It is found in Bolivia and Brazil.

== Taxonomy and systematics ==
The International Ornithological Committee (IOC), the South American Classification Committee of the American Ornithological Society (SACC), and the Clements taxonomy treat the eastern striolated puffbird as a species. According to them, the original striolated puffbird (Nystalus striolatus) was found to include a previously undefined species that is now the western striolated puffbird (N. obamai); it had not been recognized even as a subspecies. N. striolatus was renamed "eastern striolated puffbird" after the split. It has two subspecies, the nominate N. s. striolatus and N. s. torridus. However, BirdLife International's Handbook of the Birds of the World (HBW) retains the English name "striolated puffbird" for N. striolatus and assigns N. s. striolatus, N. s. obamai, and N. s. torridus as subspecies of it. To further complicate matters, N. s. torridus has been suggested as a species in its own right.

== Description ==
The eastern striolated puffbird is about 20 cm (7.9 in) long and weighs 43 to 47 g (1.5 to 1.7 oz). Its crown is dark brown with wide rufous bars, blackish toward the rear. Its hindneck has a broad buffy collar. Below that is a blackish band and the rest of the upperparts are dark brown with reddish buff spots and (at the rear) bars. The tail is narrow and blackish brown with thin rufous bars. The face has a white spot in front of the eye; the rest of the face is buffy with fine dusky streaks. The chin is white and the throat ochraceous with fine blackish streaks that gets lighter to the rear with heavier stripes. The center of the belly is whiter and unstreaked. The bill is mostly olive green, the eye pale ochre, the legs brown, and the feet dirty green.

== Distribution and habitat ==
The nominate subspecies of eastern striolated puffbird is found in the south central Amazon Basin, in Brazil between the Madeira and Tapajós rivers, and into extreme northeastern Bolivia (Santa Cruz Department). N. s. torridus is found in northeastern Amazonian Brazil south of the Amazon River and east of the Tapajós River. The species inhabits a variety of landscapes including the edges of humid tropical, terra firme, and swamp forests, and also transitional forest. It typically occurs near water or clearings, and tends to stay in the subcanopy or canopy. The species is not known to migrate.

== Behavior ==
=== Feeding ===
The foraging behavior and diet of the eastern striolated puffbird have not been documented. Most puffbirds hunt by sallying from a perch to pluck large insects and small vertebrates from foliage or bark.

=== Breeding ===
The breeding phenology of the eastern striolated puffbird has not been described. Other members of its genus nest in earthen tunnels.

=== Vocalization ===
The eastern striolated puffbird's song is "a soft, sad whistle, 'whip, whiwheeu, wheeeeeuu,' with [a] distinctive cadence." There are some differences between the songs of the two subspecies.

== Status ==
The IUCN follows HBW in treating the striolated puffbird as a single species; it is assessed as being of Least Concern. Taken as a whole, it has a very large range. Its population has not been quantified and is believed to be decreasing. It is locally quite common in Brazil and occurs in several protected areas.
