= Paracoracias =

Paracoracias Temporal range: Ypresian

Scientific classification
- Kingdom: Animalia
- Phylum: Chordata
- Class: Aves
- Order: Coraciiformes
- Genus: †Paracoracias
- Species: †P. occidentalis

Binomial name
- †Paracoracias occidentalis Clarke et al., 2009

Extinct genus of birds

Paracoracias is an extinct genus of coraciiform that lived during the Ypresian stage of the Eocene epoch.

== Distribution ==
Paracoracias occidentalis is known from the Green River Formation of Wyoming.
