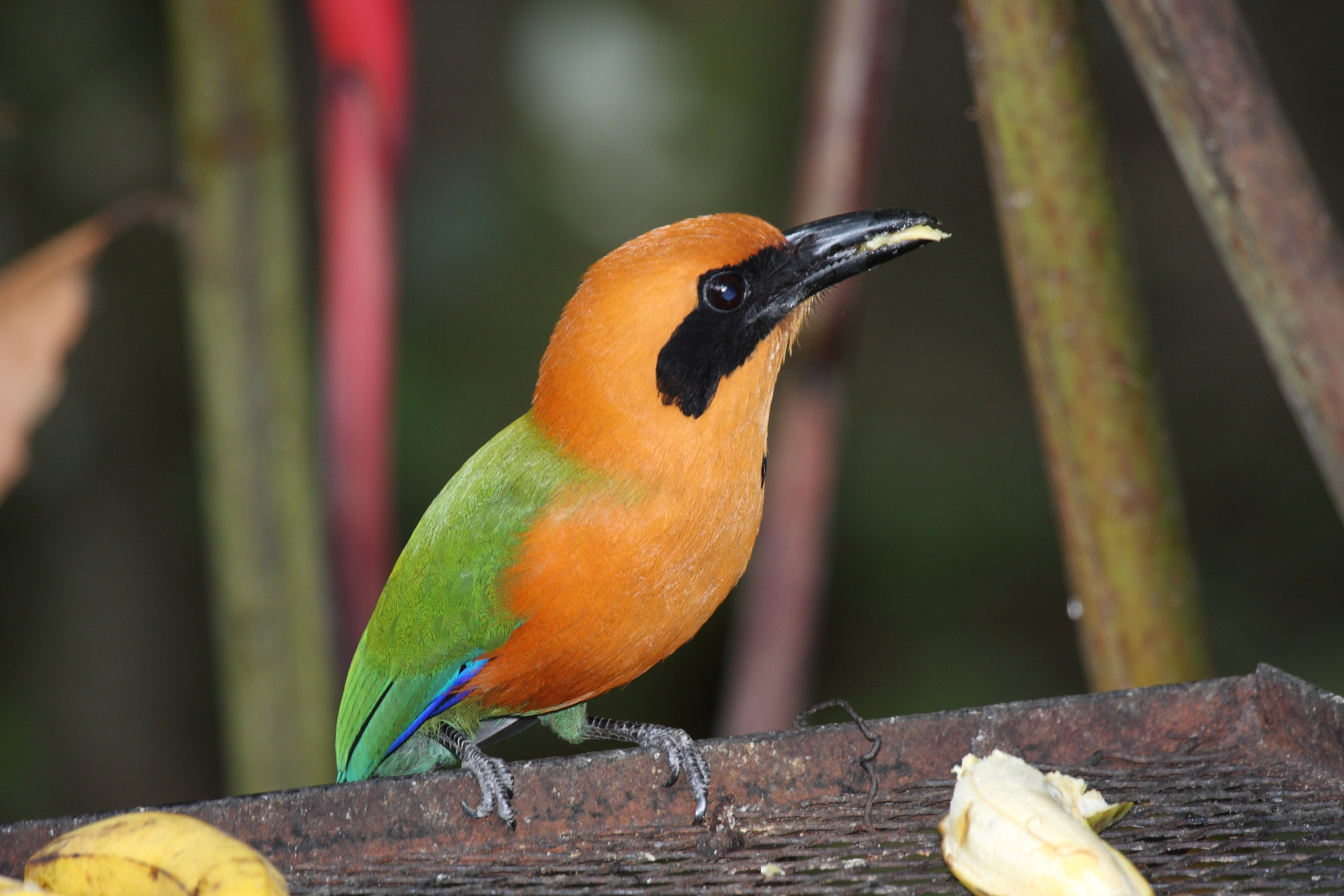
- Rufous motmot (Baryphthengus martii)

Scientific classification
- Kingdom: Animalia
- Phylum: Chordata
- Class: Aves
- Order: Coraciiformes
- Family: Momotidae
- Genus: Baryphthengus; Cabanis & Heine, 1860

Type species
- Baryphonus ruficapillus Vieillot, 1818

Species
- 2, see text

= Baryphthengus =

Genus of birds

Baryphthengus is a genus of birds in the family Momotidae. They are found in forests of South and Central America. Both species have a long tail, a black mask, and a plumage that is mainly green and rufous.

== Species ==
Image	Scientific name	Common name	Distribution
	Baryphthengus martii	Rufous motmot	northeastern Honduras south to western Ecuador, northeastern Bolivia, and southwestern Brazil.
	Baryphthengus ruficapillus	Rufous-capped motmot	Argentina, Brazil, and Paraguay.
