= Geranopterus =

Geranopterus Temporal range: late Eocene to early Miocene

Scientific classification
- Kingdom: Animalia
- Phylum: Chordata
- Class: Aves
- Order: Coraciiformes
- Family: †Geranopteridae
- Genus: †Geranopterus; Milne-Edwards, 1892

Species
- †G. milneedwardsi; †G. alatus; †G. bohemicus

Extinct genus of birds

Geranopterus is an extinct genus of Geranopteridae that lived during the late Eocene to early Miocene in Europe. It was named by Milne-Edwards in 1892.
