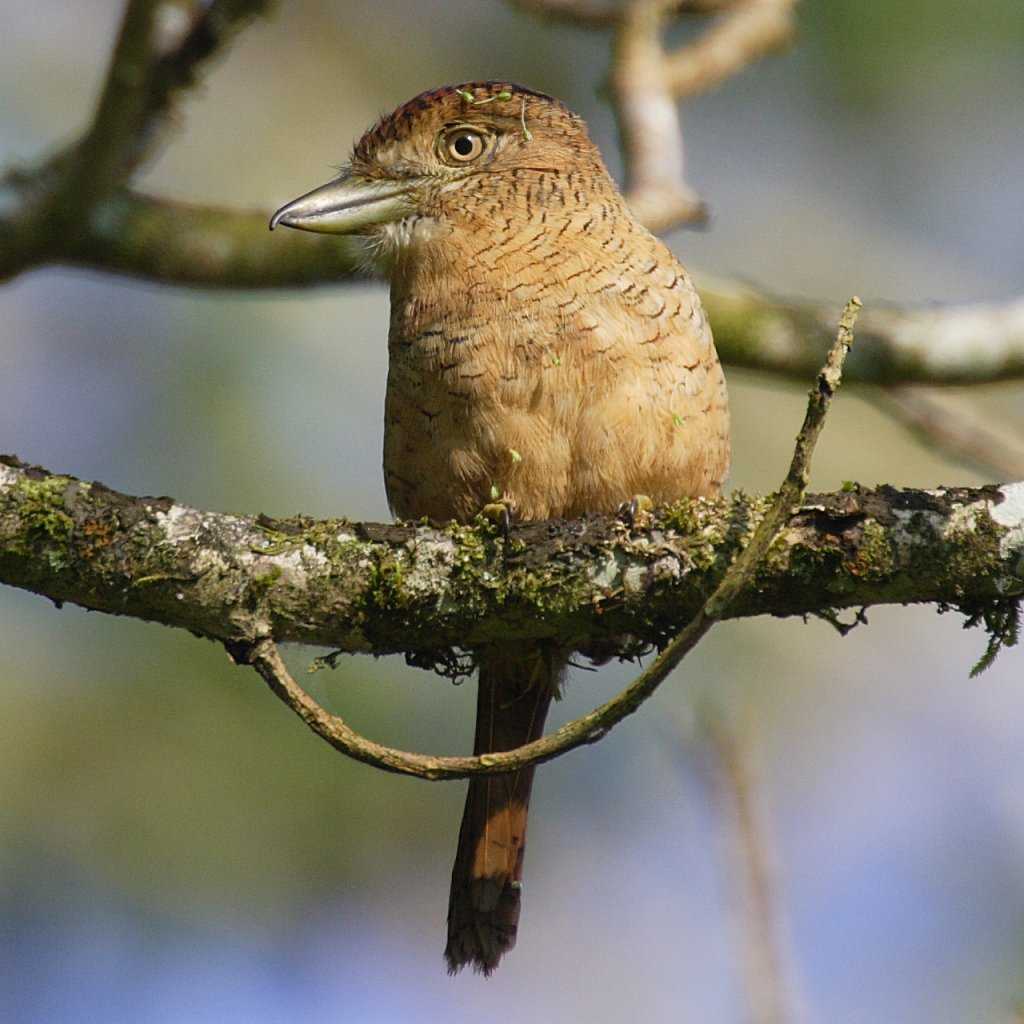
- Barred puffbird (Nystalus radiatus)

Scientific classification
- Kingdom: Animalia
- Phylum: Chordata
- Class: Aves
- Order: Piciformes
- Family: Bucconidae
- Genus: Nystalus; Cabanis & Heine, 1863

Type species
- Alcedo maculata Gmelin, 1788

= Nystalus =

Genus of birds

Nystalus is a genus of puffbirds in the family Bucconidae.

The genus Nystalus was introduced in 1863 by the German ornithologists Jean Cabanis and Ferdinand Heine. The genus name is from Ancient Greek nustalos meaning "drowsy". The type species was designated in 1882 as the caatinga puffbird by Philip Sclater.

The genus contains the following five species:

Genus Nystalus – Cabanis & Heine, 1863 – six species
Common name	Scientific name and subspecies	Range	Size and ecology	IUCN status and estimated population
White-eared puffbird	Nystalus chacuru (Vieillot, 1816)	Brazil, Bolivia, Paraguay, Argentina, and Peru.	Size: Habitat: Diet:	LC
Spot-backed puffbird	Nystalus maculatus (Gmelin, JF, 1788)	eastern Brazil.	Size: Habitat: Diet:	LC
Barred puffbird	Nystalus radiatus (Sclater, PL, 1854)	Panama, Colombia and Ecuador.	Size: Habitat: Diet:	LC
Eastern striolated puffbird	Nystalus striolatus (Pelzeln, 1856)	Brazil and Bolivia	Size: Habitat: Diet:	LC
Western striolated puffbird	Nystalus obamai (Whitney, Piacentini, Schunck, Aleixo, de Sousa, BRS, Silveira & Rêgo, MA, 2013)	Bolivia, western Brazil, Colombia, Ecuador, and Peru.	Size: Habitat: Diet:	LC
