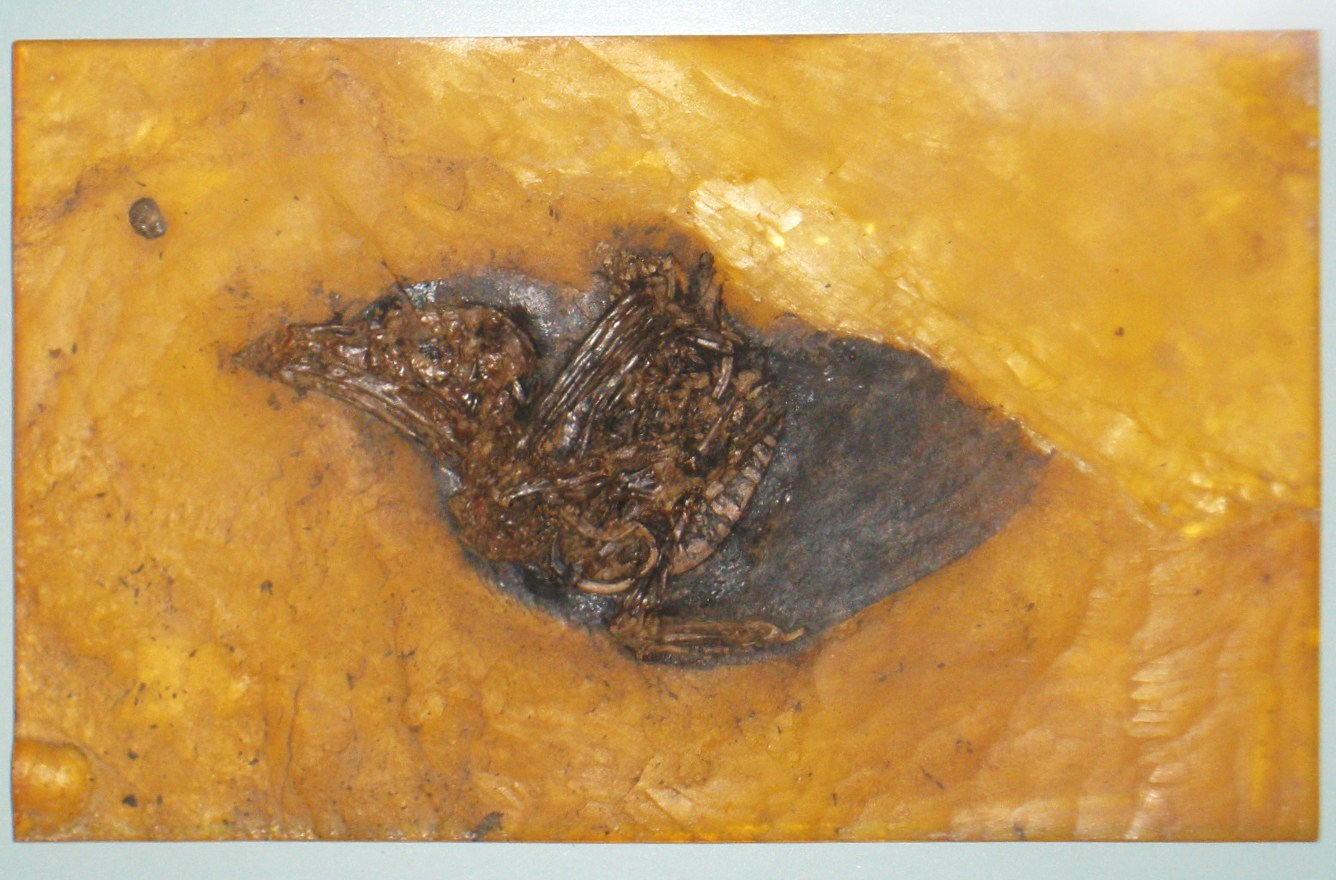
- Fossil specimen

Scientific classification
- Kingdom: Animalia
- Phylum: Chordata
- Class: Aves
- Order: Coraciiformes
- Family: †Eocoraciidae; Mayr & Mourer-Chauviré, 2000
- Genus: †Eocoracias; Mayr & Mourer-Chauviré, 2000
- Species: †E. brachyptera

Binomial name
- †Eocoracias brachyptera Mayr & Mourer-Chauviré, 2000

= Eocoracias =

Eocoracias Temporal range: Eocene, 47 Ma

Extinct genus of birds

Eocoracias is an extinct genus of bird related to modern rollers and other Coraciiformes such as kingfishers, bee-eaters, motmots, and todies. It contains one species, Eocoracias brachyptera, and it lived approximately 47 million years ago (Lutetian stage) based on dating of the fossil site. It is known for a specimen having preserved non-iridescent structural coloration on its feathers, previously unknown in fossil birds. Fossils have been found at the Messel Pit in Germany.

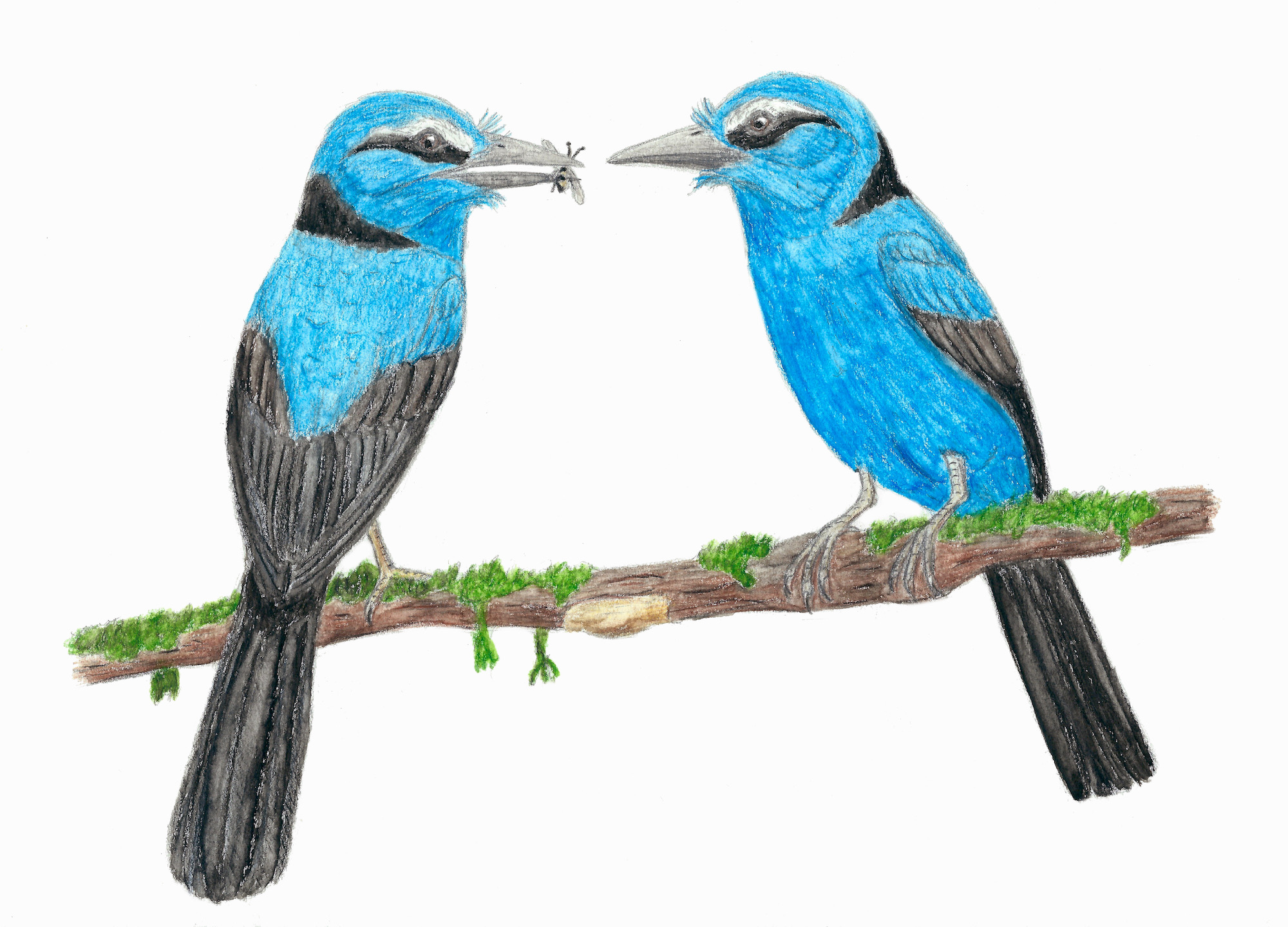
Life restoration with inferred coloration

== See also ==
- Dinosaur coloration
