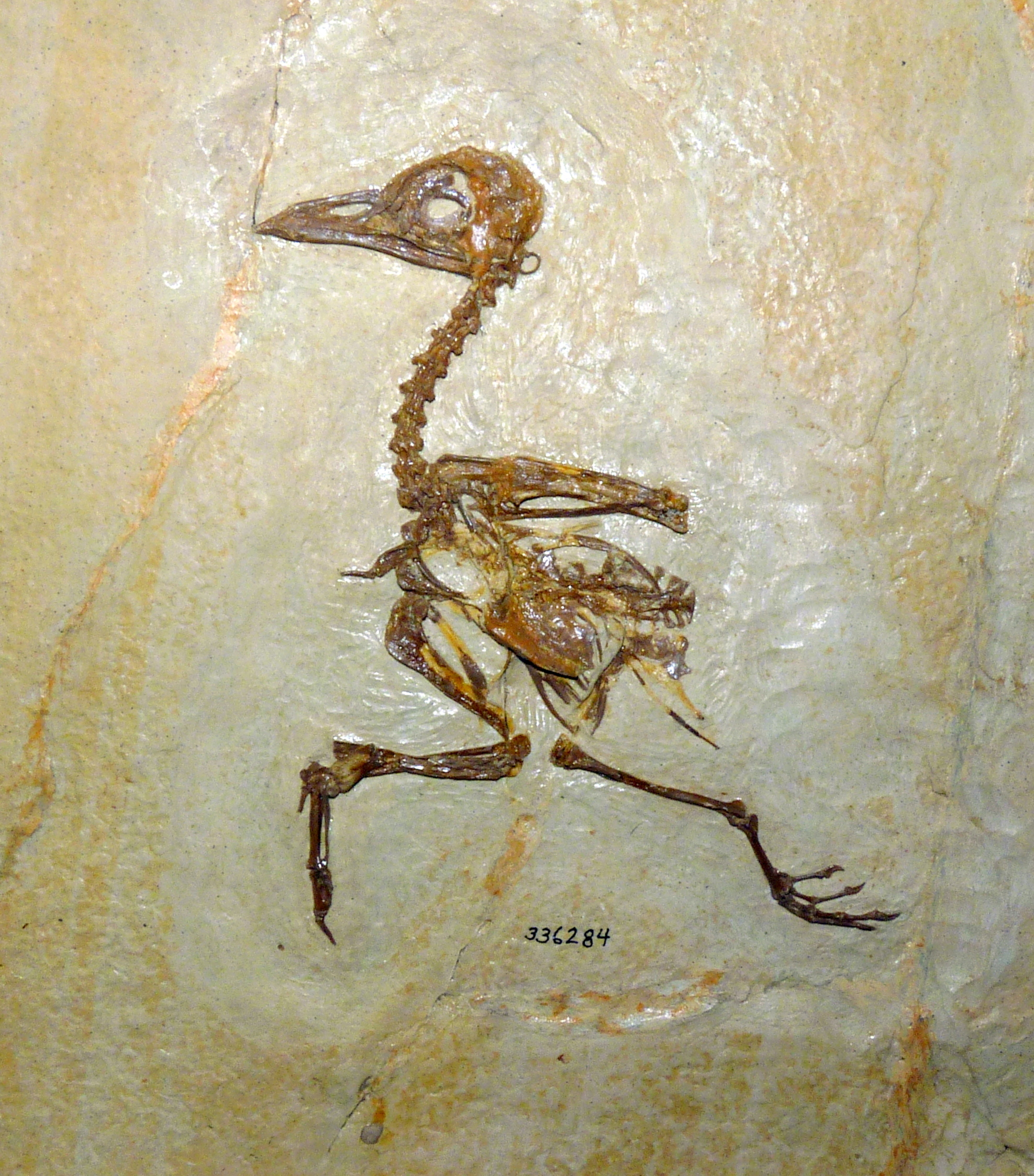

Scientific classification
- Kingdom: Animalia
- Phylum: Chordata
- Class: Aves
- Order: Coraciiformes
- Family: †Primobucconidae
- Genus: †Primobucco; Brodkorb, 1970

Type species
- Primobucco mcgrewi

= Primobucco =

Primobucco Temporal range: Eocene

Extinct genus of birds

Primobucco is an extinct genus of bird placed in its own family, Primobucconidae. The type species, Primobucco mcgrewi, lived during the Lower Eocene of North America. It was initially described by American paleo-ornithologist Pierce Brodkorb in 1970, from a fossil right wing, and thought to be an early puffbird. However, the discovery of a further 12 fossils in 2010 indicate that it is instead an early type of roller.

Related fossils from the European Messel deposits have been assigned to the two species P. perneri and P. frugilegus. Two specimens of P. frugilegus have been found with seeds in the area of their digestive tract, which suggests that these birds were more omnivorous than the exclusively predaceous modern rollers.

== See also ==
- Neanis
