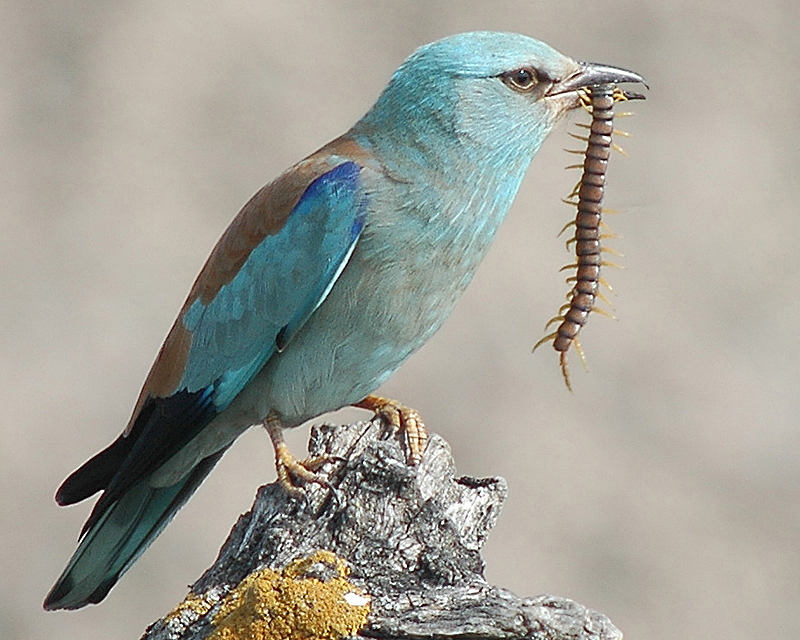
- European roller Coracias garrulus

Scientific classification
- Kingdom: Animalia
- Phylum: Chordata
- Class: Aves
- Clade: Picodynastornithes
- Order: Coraciiformes; Forbes, 1884

Families
- Meropidae; Brachypteraciidae; Coraciidae; Todidae; Momotidae; Alcedinidae; For prehistoric taxa, see text.
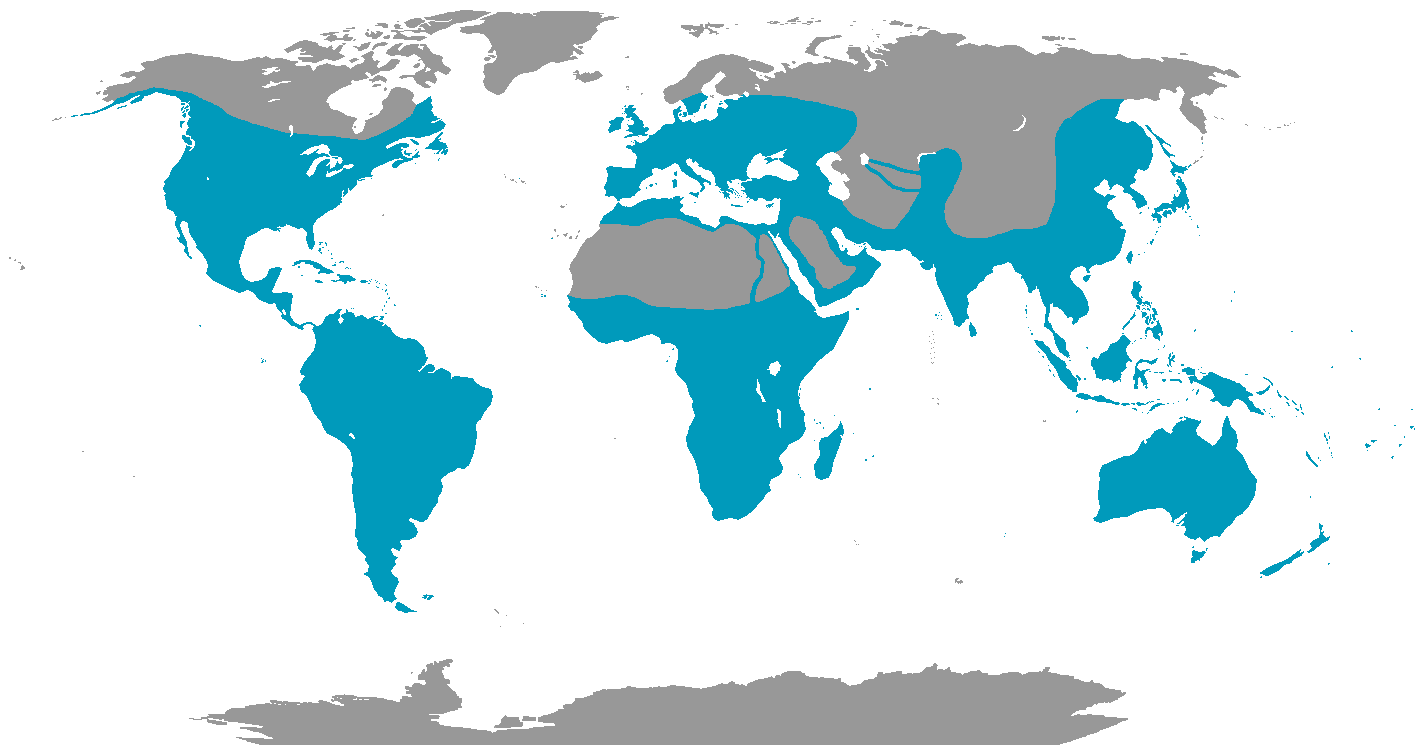
- Global distribution of the kingfisher and allies.

= Coraciiformes =

Coraciiformes Temporal range: Middle Eocene to present

Order of birds

The Coraciiformes /kɒrəˈsaɪ.ɪfɔːrmiːz/ are a group of usually colourful birds including the kingfishers, the bee-eaters, the rollers, the motmots, and the todies. They generally have syndactyly, with three forward-pointing toes (and toes 3 & 4 fused at their base), though in many kingfishers one of these is missing.

In the past, Coraciiformes encompassed all anisodactyl (including syndactyl) members of the Cavitaves. This means that the birds currently classified in Leptosomiformes (cuckoo-roller) and Bucerotiformes (hornbills, hoopoes and allies) were formerly classified in Coraciiformes.

This is largely an Old World order, with the representation in the New World limited to the dozen or so species of todies and motmots, and a mere handful of the more than a hundred species of kingfishers.

The name Coraciiformes means "raven-like". Specifically, it comes from the Latin language "corax", meaning "raven" and Latin "forma", meaning "form".

== Systematics ==
The phylogenetic relationships between the six families in the order Coraciiformes is shown below. The cladogram is based on a large study by Richard Prum and colleagues published in 2015. The number of species in each family is taken from the list maintained by Frank Gill, Pamela C. Rasmussen and David Donsker on behalf of the International Ornithological Committee (IOC).

- Coraciiformes
  - - Meropidae – bee-eaters (31 species)
    - - Brachypteraciidae – ground rollers (5 species)
      - Coraciidae – rollers (13 species)
  - - Todidae – todies (5 species)
    - - Momotidae – motmots (14 species)
      - Alcedinidae – kingfishers (118 species)

Several extinct coraciiform families are only known from Paleogene fossils. They probably belong to the basal group and are sometimes difficult to assign because they were even closer still to the Piciformes (see also Neanis). In addition, there are some prehistoric genera which are likewise difficult to place into a family. At least the Eocoraciidae are very basal, but the Late Eocene (some 35 mya) Geranopteridae form a superfamily Coracioidea with the extant rollers and ground-rollers already (Mayr & Mourer-Chauviré 2000). A few prehistoric taxa of the present-day families have been described; see the family articles for details.

== Taxonomic sequence ==
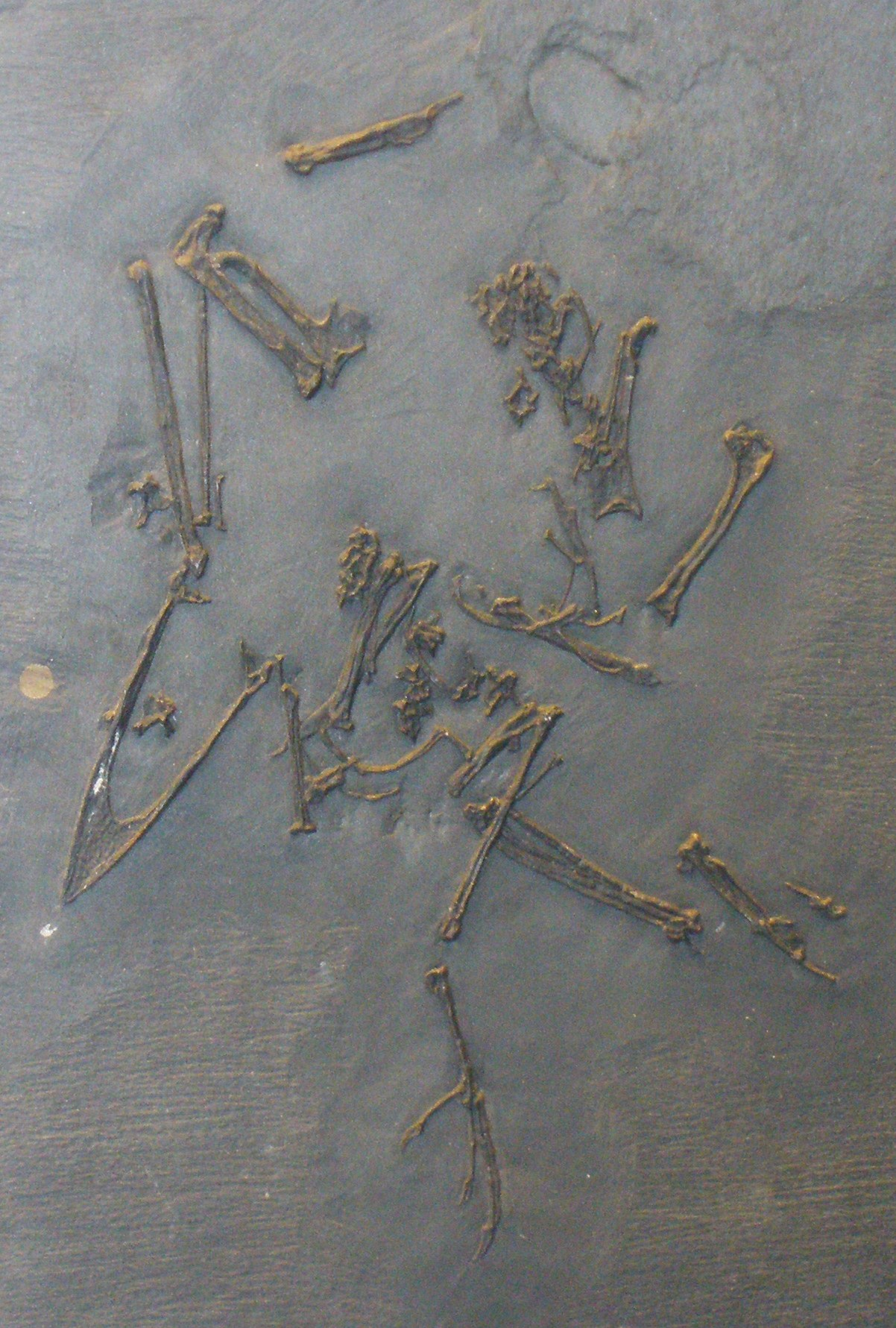
- Protornis, a fossil coraciiform from the Oligocene of Switzerland
  Unresolved
  - Genus Quasisyndactylus (fossil; Middle Eocene of Messel, Germany) - alcediniform, basal?
  - Genus Cryptornis (fossil; Late Eocene of France) – bucerotid? geranopterid?
  - Family Primobucconidae (fossil), including Primobucco and Septencoracias
  - Coraciiformes gen. et spp. indet. PQ 1216, QU 15640 (fossil; Late Eocene of Quercy, France: Mayr & Mourer-Chauviré 2000)
  - Genus Protornis (fossil: Oligocene of Switzerland) – basal to motmotids and meropids?

A recent study suggest that the following families may belong to a separate order called Bucerotiformes. The results still in dispute though.

- Family Bucorvidae (ground hornbills)
- Family Bucerotidae (hornbills)
- Family Upupidae (hoopoe)
- Family Phoeniculidae (woodhoopoes)

The Leptosomidae (cuckoo roller) probably do not belong here. The trogons are sometimes placed here as a family Trogonidae. The Late Eocene Palaeospizidae are sometimes also placed in the Coraciiformes, as are the Early to Middle Eocene Primobucconidae and the Middle Eocene to Early Oligocene Sylphornithidae. The Primobucconidae at least indeed seem to belong here.

- Basal group
  - Family Eocoraciidae (fossil; Middle Eocene of Messel, Germany)
  - Family Geranopteridae (fossil; Late Eocene of Quercy, France – Early Miocene of Czech Republic) - includes "Nupharanassa" bohemica
  - Family Coraciidae (rollers)
  - Family Brachypteraciidae (ground-rollers)
  - Family Meropidae (bee-eaters)
- Suborder Alcedines
  - Family Todidae (todies)
  - Family Momotidae (motmots)
  - Family Alcedinidae (kingfishers)

== See also ==
- List of Coraciiformes by population
