= Grey elaenia =

Grey elaenia refers to birds that had been considered one species and have been split into three species:

- Gray-headed elaenia, Myiopagis caniceps
- Choco elaenia, Myiopagis parambae
- Amazonian elaenia, Myiopagis cinerea
