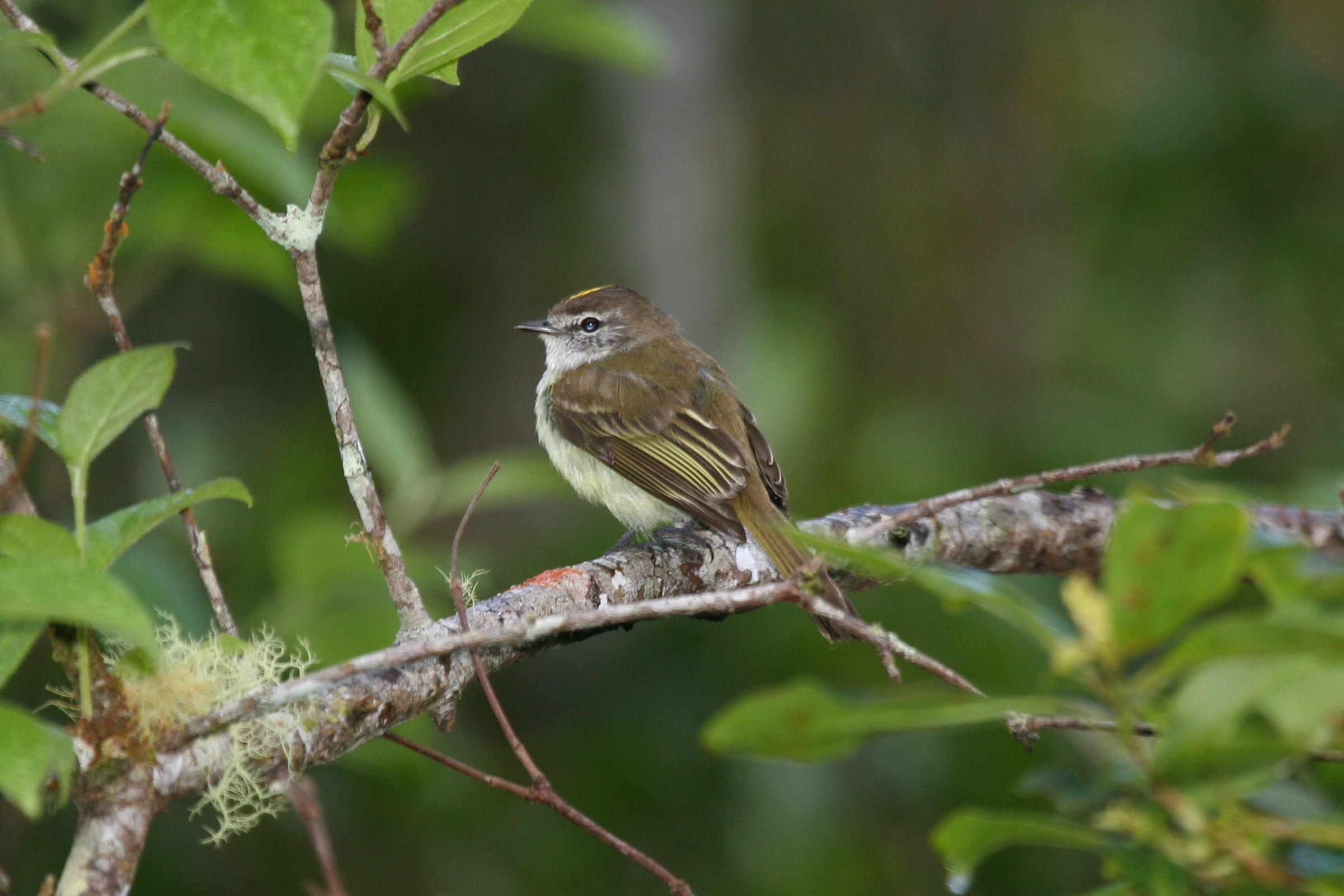
- Jamaican elaenia (Myiopagis cotta)

Scientific classification
- Kingdom: Animalia
- Phylum: Chordata
- Class: Aves
- Order: Passeriformes
- Family: Tyrannidae
- Genus: Myiopagis; Salvin & Godman, 1888

Type species
- Elainea placens Sclater, 1859

= Myiopagis =

Genus of birds

Myiopagis is a genus of birds in the family Tyrannidae, the tyrant flycatchers. These species are closely related to the genus Elaenia but are generally smaller.

== Taxonomy ==
The genus Myiopagis was introduced in 1888 by the English naturalists Osbert Salvin and Frederick DuCane Godman with the type species as Elainea placens Sclater. This taxa is now considered to be a subspecies of the greenish elaenia (Myiopagis viridicata). The genus name Myiopagis combines the Ancient Greek μυια/muia meaning "fly" with παγις/pagis meaning "trap".

The genus contains the following 9 species:

Image	Scientific name	Common name	Distribution
	Myiopagis caniceps	Gray-headed elaenia	from southeast Brazil to Bolivia, Paraguay, and northern Argentina
	Myiopagis parambae	Choco elaenia	from eastern Panama to northwestern Ecuador
	Myiopagis cinerea	Amazonian elaenia	Amazonia
	Myiopagis cotta	Jamaican elaenia	Jamaica
	Myiopagis flavivertex	Yellow-crowned elaenia	Colombia, Brazil, Guyana, Suriname, French Guiana, Ecuador and Peru.
	Myiopagis gaimardii	Forest elaenia	from Panama through Colombia, Venezuela and the Guianas to Bolivia and Brazil.
	Myiopagis olallai	Foothill elaenia	Ecuador and Peru.
	Myiopagis subplacens	Pacific elaenia	Ecuador and Peru.
	Myiopagis viridicata	Greenish elaenia	Neotropics
