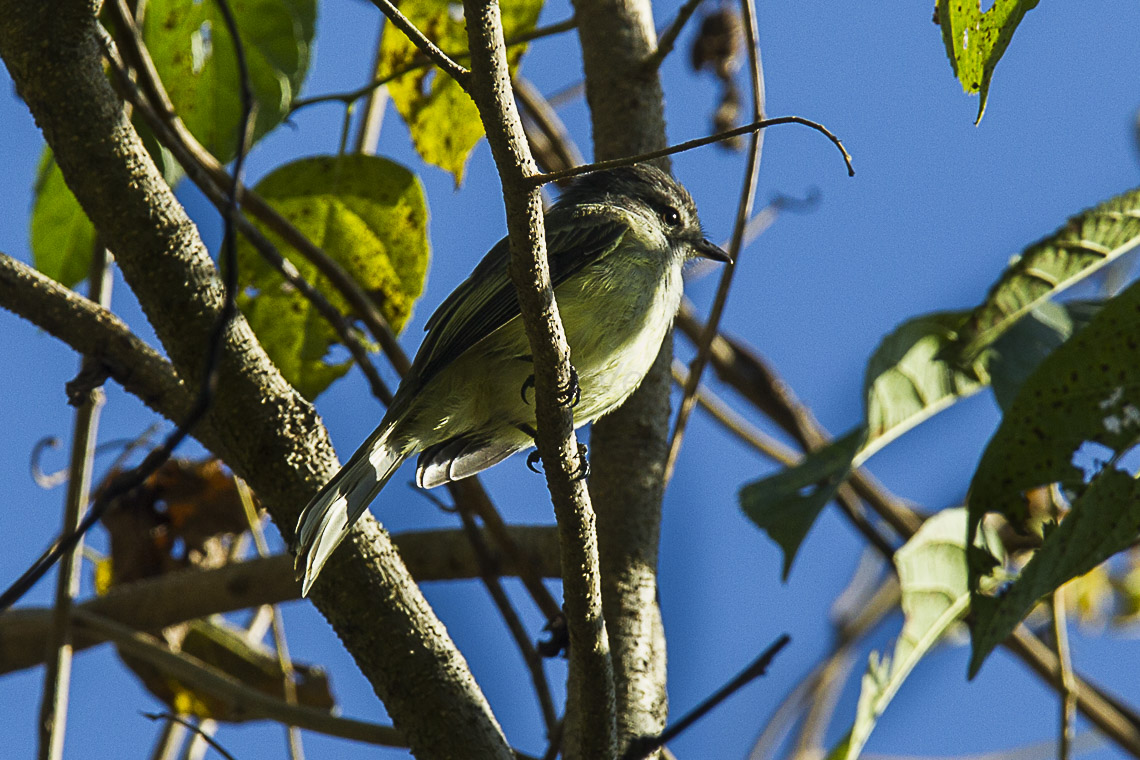

Conservation status
- Least Concern (IUCN 3.1)

Scientific classification
- Kingdom: Animalia
- Phylum: Chordata
- Class: Aves
- Order: Passeriformes
- Family: Tyrannidae
- Genus: Myiopagis
- Species: M. subplacens

Binomial name
- Myiopagis subplacens (Sclater, PL, 1862)

= Pacific elaenia =

Species of bird

The Pacific elaenia (Myiopagis subplacens) is a species of bird in subfamily Elaeniinae of family Tyrannidae, the tyrant flycatchers. It is found in Ecuador and Peru.

== Taxonomy and systematics ==
The Pacific elaenia was originally described as Elaenia subplacens. It was moved to genus Myiopagis in the mid twentieth century and later confirmed by genetic analysis to belong there. The Pacific elaenia is monotypic.

== Description ==
The Pacific elaenia is about 14 cm (5.5 in) long; one male weighed 14.9 g (0.53 oz) and four females averaged 16.9 g (0.60 oz). The sexes have the same plumage. Adults have a gray-brown crown with a partially concealed bright yellow stripe along its middle. They have whitish lores, a partial white eyering, a grizzled whitish lower face with blackish ends on the ear coverts, and a wide whitish supercilium that continues down behind the black of the ear coverts. Their upperparts are brownish olive. Their wings are dusky with pale yellow edges on the inner flight feathers and yellowish tips on the coverts; the last form two faint bars on the closed wing. Their tail is grayish olive. Their throat and breast are pale grayish with whiter streaks on the breast; their belly is pale yellow. Both sexes have a brown or dark brown iris, a black bill with a pinkish or dirty white base to the mandible, and black or dark gray legs and feet.

== Distribution and habitat ==
The Pacific elaenia is found in the Pacific lowlands and foothills from western Esmeraldas Province in northern Ecuador south into Peru as far as Lambayeque and southwestern Cajamarca departments. It inhabits somewhat dry to semi-humid deciduous forest, secondary forest near older forest, and tall scrub. In elevation it reaches 1,700 m (5,600 ft) in Ecuador and 1,800 m (5,900 ft) in Peru.

== Behavior ==
=== Movement ===
The Pacific elaenia is believed to be a year-round resident throughout its range.

=== Feeding ===
The Pacific elaenia's diet has not been studied, but it is known to include insects and small fruits. It typically forages singly or in pairs in the forest canopy and seldom joins mixed-species feeding flocks.

=== Breeding ===
Nothing is known about the Pacific elaenia's breeding biology.

=== Vocalization ===
The Pacific elaenia's dawn song is "an endlessly repeated 'chrrr, chrrr, che-wik, chrrr, chrrr, che-wik...' ". During the day it sings "a sharp, burry PJIT! djurrrree, the second note rising" and its calls include "a gruff pjrt and similar notes".

== Status ==
The IUCN has assessed the Pacific elaenia as being of Least Concern. It has a large range; its population size is not known and is believed to be decreasing. No immediate threats have been identified. It is considered uncommon to fairly common in Ecuador and fairly common in Peru.
