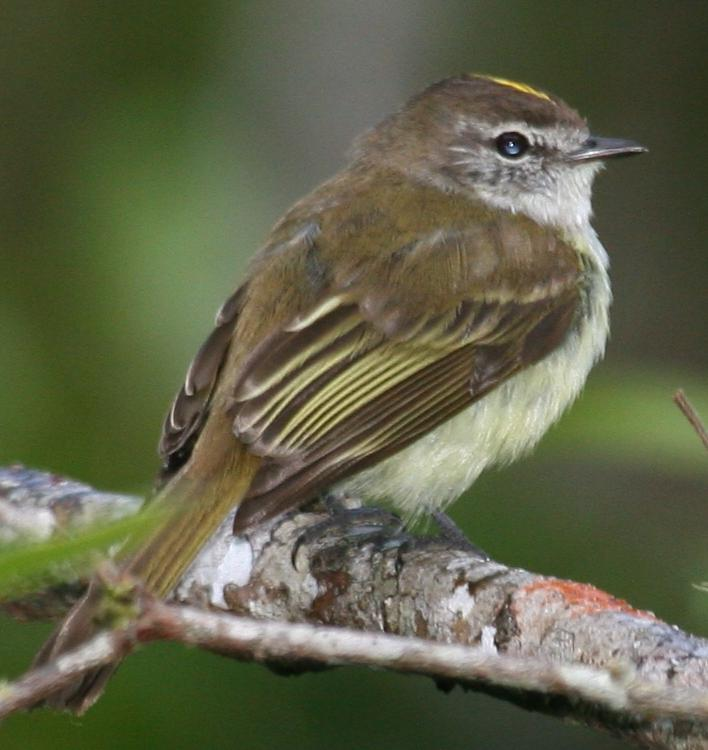

Conservation status
- Least Concern (IUCN 3.1)

Scientific classification
- Kingdom: Animalia
- Phylum: Chordata
- Class: Aves
- Order: Passeriformes
- Family: Tyrannidae
- Genus: Myiopagis
- Species: M. cotta

Binomial name
- Myiopagis cotta (Gosse, 1849)

= Jamaican elaenia =

Species of bird

The Small Jamaican elaenia (Myiopagis cotta) is a species of bird in the family Tyrannidae. It is endemic to Jamaica. Its natural habitats are subtropical or tropical moist lowland forests, subtropical or tropical moist montane forests, and heavily degraded former forest.

== Description ==
The Jamaican elaenia measures 12–13 cm (4.7–5.1 in) from bill to tail and weighs 11.5–13 g (0.41–0.46 oz). Its plumage is a greenish-olive above, a whitish yellow below, and its head is slightly darker with feathers somewhat elongated, concealing their bright orange-yellow patch. Its wings and tail are a dusky olive color with yellow stripes throughout. Its bill is short and black along with its legs. Juvenile Jamaican elaenia lack the coronal patch on their head, has pale gray underparts, and their belly is more yellow.

== Habitat ==
The Jamaican elaenia is native to Jamaica where 75% of its original forest has been cleared and what remains of that is majority second growth. The 25% that remains of original forest remains on high mountains and cliffs and places that are undisturbed by humans or places that prove to be more difficult to get to or uninhabitable land. Likewise, land in Jamaica is also protected by the John Crow national park. Their habitat is also exposed to hurricane damage, use of pesticides, plantations, forest removal, forest fires, and urbanization.

== Diet ==
Jamaican elaenia perch in trees, hunting for prey while also grabbing items from vegetation while in flight. Usually, they will hunt from the understory to the canopy. They search for insects and when those insects are unavailable, they will eat fruits.

== Vocalizations ==
This bird makes rapid sounds. They are always high pitched and make a "ti-si-si-sip" sound.

== Reproduction ==
The nest is a well-formed cup of plant materials, hidden in plants, leaves, and trees. Jamaican elaenia clutch three eggs, but there is no information on the incubation period.

== Lifespan ==
The Jamaican elaenia life span averages 3.6 years.

== Conservation status ==
The conservation status of the Jamaican elaenia is currently at the "least concern" which is the lowest out of the seven possible options. It has been observed every four to six years by the IUCN Red List since 1988. For the first sixteen years, the bird's conservation status was "Unknown" because it did not qualify for a population count that the IUCN deemed necessary to track. 2004 was the first year they were tracked and ranked at "least concern" which they have been ranked at since 2004 through the present. The population size is decreasing but is yet to decline enough to be considered "Vulnerable" on the IUCN Red List. For them to be vulnerable they would have to decrease in population by more than thirty percent to be considered.
