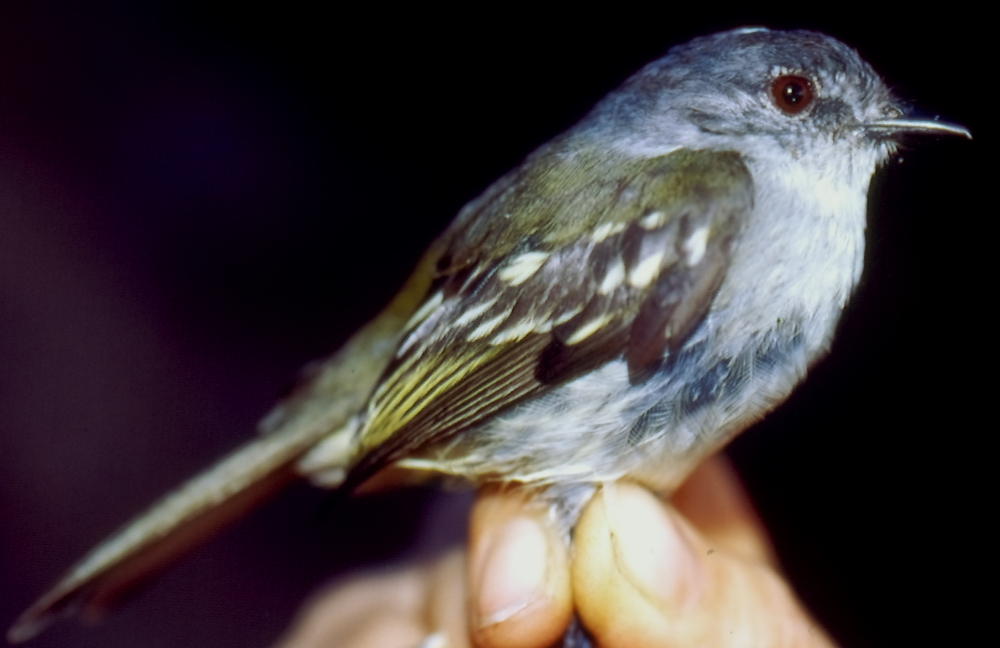

Conservation status
- Least Concern (IUCN 3.1)

Scientific classification
- Kingdom: Animalia
- Phylum: Chordata
- Class: Aves
- Order: Passeriformes
- Family: Tyrannidae
- Genus: Myiopagis
- Species: M. olallai

Binomial name
- Myiopagis olallai Coopmans & Krabbe, 2000

= Foothill elaenia =

Species of bird

The foothill elaenia (Myiopagis olallai) is a species of bird in subfamily Elaeniinae of family Tyrannidae, the tyrant flycatchers. It is found in Colombia, Ecuador, Peru, and Venezuela.

== Taxonomy and systematics ==
The foothill elaenia has three subspecies, the nominate M. o. olallai (Coopmans & Krabbe, 2000), M. o. coopmansi (Cuervo, Stiles, Lentino, Brumfield & Derryberry, 2014), and M. o. incognita (Cuervo, Stiles, Lentino, Brumfield & Derryberry, 2014).

== Description ==
The foothill elaenia is 12 to 12.5 cm (4.7 to 4.9 in) long. The sexes have the same plumage. Adults of the nominate subspecies have a dark gray crown with a partially concealed white stripe along its middle. They have a mottled gray and white loral spot, eyering, and lower face. Their upperparts are olive green. Their wings are dusky with thin olive green edges on the primaries and pale yellow edges on the other flight feathers. Pale yellow tips on the wing coverts form three bars on the closed wing. Their tail is browner than the wings and the feathers have thin olive green edges. Their throat is whitish with faint gray mottling. The rest of their underparts are sulphur yellow with olive markings on the lower throat and breast. Subspecies M. o. coopmansi has an unmarked pale olive-gray breast and a whitish belly with little or no yellow. M. o. incognita has a pale gray throat, a pale grayish olive breast, and a pale gray belly. Both sexes of all subspecies have a brown iris, a blackish maxilla, a blackish mandible with a brownish gray or gray-brown base, and blackish legs and feet.

== Distribution and habitat ==
The foothill elaenia has a disjunct distribution. The nominate subspecies is found locally on the east side of the Andes in both northern and southern Ecuador and also in south-central Peru's Cordillera Vilcabamba. It might also occur between these isolated areas, and there is also at least one record in southern Colombia. Subspecies M. o. coopmansi is found at the north end of Colombia's Central Andes in Antioquia Department. M. o. incognita is known only from three specimens collected on the Venezuelan side of the Serranía del Perijá but is assumed to also be on the Colombian side. The species inhabits the interior and edges of humid montane forest. In elevation it occurs between 1,000 and 1,500 m (3,300 and 4,900 ft) in Ecuador, at about 900 m (3,000 ft) in Peru, and at about 1,100 m (3,600 ft) in Venezuela.

== Behavior ==
=== Movement ===
The foothill elaenia is assumed to be a year-round resident throughout its range.

=== Feeding ===
The foothill elaenia's diet has not been studied but it is known to feed on insects. It typically forages in pairs associated with a mixed-species feeding flock. It forages from the forest's mid level to the canopy, taking prey mostly while briefly hovering after a short sally from a perch.

=== Breeding ===
Nothing is known about the foothill elaenia's breeding biology.

=== Vocalization ===
What are thought to be songs of the nominate subspecies of the foothill elaenia are "a rapid, descending trilled t'teerrr, and a longer, rising trilled t'teerrreeeeeee"; it also makes "a rising series, tew-tew-tew" which sometimes is extended into a trill. The song of subspecies M. o. coopmansi is similar but longer and faster-paced. That of M. o. incognita is unknown.

== Status ==
The IUCN originally in 2002 assessed the foothill elaenia as Near Threatened, then in 2011 as Vulnerable, and since 2019 as being of Least Concern. Its population size is not known and is believed to be decreasing. No immediate threats have been identified. The "Foothill Elaenia is very vulnerable to habitat loss. The narrow elevational band that it occupies along the lower eastern slopes of the Andes is 'disappearing at an alarming rate', primarily by clearing for subsistence agriculture".
