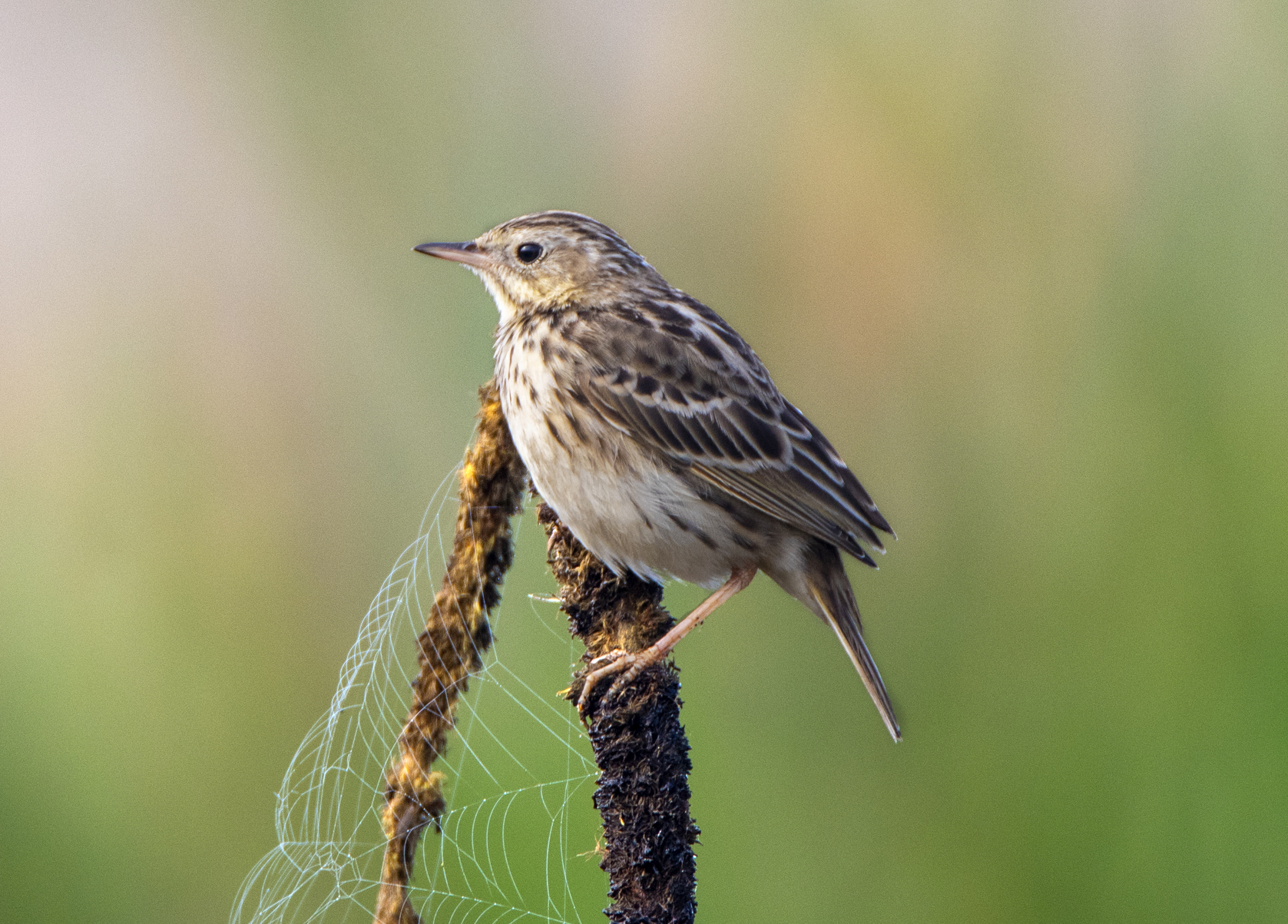

Conservation status
- Least Concern (IUCN 3.1)

Scientific classification
- Kingdom: Animalia
- Phylum: Chordata
- Class: Aves
- Order: Passeriformes
- Family: Motacillidae
- Genus: Anthus
- Species: A. peruvianus

Binomial name
- Anthus peruvianus Nicholson, 1878

= Peruvian pipit =

Species of bird

The Peruvian pipit (Anthus peruvianus) is a species of bird in the family Motacillidae, the wagtails and pipits. It is found in Chile and Peru.

== Taxonomy and systematics ==
The Peruvian pipit was described by Francis Nicholson in 1878 with the binomial Anthus peruvianus. For much of the twentieth century and into the twenty-first it was treated as a subspecies of what is now the yellowish pipit (originally A. chii, then A. lutescens, and now again A. chii). Nicholson had noted its similarity to A. chii. It was again recognized as a full species following a study published in 2018.

The Peruvian pipit is monotypic.

== Description ==
The Peruvian pipit is one of the smallest members of genus Anthus. It is 13 to 14 cm (5.1 to 5.5 in) long. The sexes have the same plumage. Adults have a brown head with a weak whitish supercilium and a thin white eye-ring. Their upperparts are brown with dark streaks and white "braces" on the shoulders. Their wing coverts have pale tips that show as two wing bars. Their flight feathers are blackish brown with buff edges. Their tail is mostly blackish brown with much white on the outer two pairs of feathers. Their throat and underparts are whitish with dark brown streaks in a band across the breast. They have a dark iris, a dark maxilla, a pale pinkish mandible, and pale pinkish legs and feet.

== Distribution and habitat ==
The Peruvian pipit is found in a thin coastal band from Piura Department in far northwestern Peru south into extreme northwestern Chile's Arica Province. In Peru it inhabits marshes, pastures, and agricultural fields at elevations from sea level up to about 450 m (1,500 ft). In Chile it is found mostly in areas of short grass on sandy soils up to about 100 m (300 ft).

== Behavior ==
=== Movement ===
The Peruvian pipit is a year-round resident.

=== Feeding ===
The Peruvian pipit's diet has not been studied but is known to include insects and thought to also include seeds. It forages while walking and running on the ground.

=== Breeding ===
Nothing is known about the Peruvian pipit's breeding biology.

=== Vocalization ===
The Peruvian pipit's song is "one or several introductory notes followed by a descending sizzle: tik tik SIZZZZZZZZZZZZZ-ZZZZZ". Its call is "a dry chit-it".

== Status ==
The IUCN has assessed the Peruvian pipit as being of Least Concern. Its population size is not known but is believed to be stable. No immediate threats have been identified. It is considered fairly common in Peru. Its population in Chile probably fluctuates "depending on available vegetation (i.e. dry vs. wet years)".
