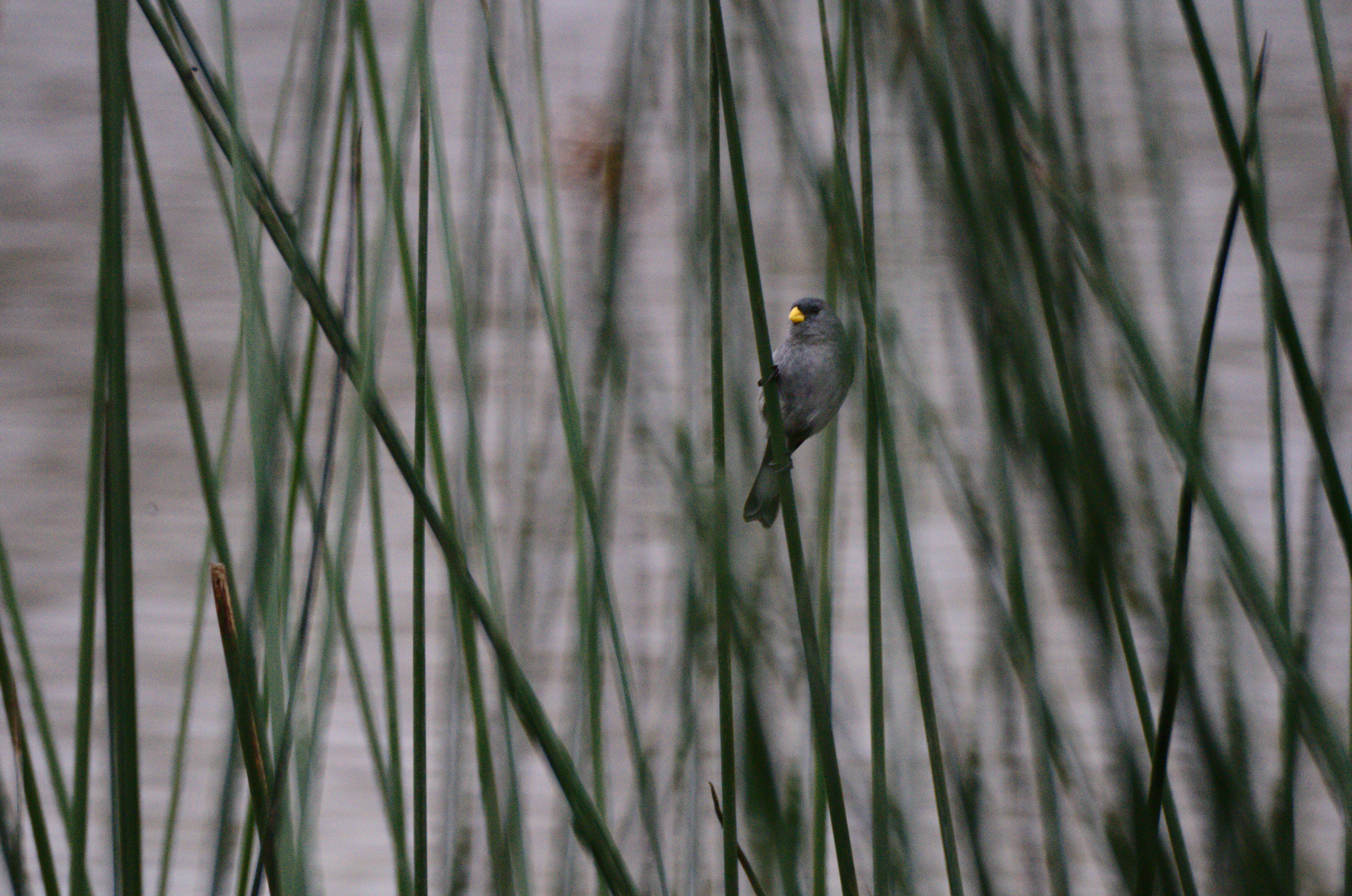

Conservation status
- Least Concern (IUCN 3.1)

Scientific classification
- Kingdom: Animalia
- Phylum: Chordata
- Class: Aves
- Order: Passeriformes
- Family: Thraupidae
- Genus: Sporophila
- Species: S. schistacea

Binomial name
- Sporophila schistacea (Lawrence, 1862)

= Slate-coloured seedeater =

Slate-colored seedeater

Species of bird

The slate-colored seedeater (Note: The IOC, AviList, the Clements taxonomy, HBW, the American Ornithological Society, and the South American Classification Committee all spell the species "slate-colored".) (Sporophila schistacea) is a species of bird in the family Thraupidae, the tanagers and allies. It is found in most countries of Central America and every mainland South American country except Argentina, Chile, French Guiana, Paraguay, and Uruguay. It formerly occurred on Trinidad but has been extirpated there.

== Taxonomy and systematics ==
The slate-colored seedeater has a complicated taxonomic history. It was formally described in 1862 with the binomial Spermophila schistacea. At the time, the genus Spermophila was in the family Fringillidae. By 1938 the slate-colored seedeater had been reassigned to its present genus Sporophila that had been erected in 1844 to replace Spermophila. The new genus was in the family Emberizidae. Based on studies published between 1988 and 2011, beginning in 2012 Sporophila was moved to the tanager family Thraupidae.

The slate-colored seedeater's further taxonomy remains unsettled. As of September 2026 the most recent versions of the IOC, AviList, and BirdLife International's Handbook of the Birds of the World (HBW) assign it these three subspecies:

- S. s. schistacea (Lawrence, 1862)
- S. s. incerta Riley, 1914
- S. s. longipennis Chubb, C, 1921

The Clements taxonomy adds a fourth subspecies, S. s. subconcolor (Berlioz, 1959), that the others include within S. s. schistacea.

This article follows the majority three-subspecies model.

== Description ==
The slate-colored seedeater is 10.6 to 11.1 cm (4.2 to 4.4 in) long and weighs 12 to 13.7 g (0.42 to 0.48 oz). It has a large bill with a very deep base and a rounded culmen. The species is sexually dimorphic. Adult males of the nominate subspecies S. s. schistacea have a slate-gray head with a white eye-ring and a white arc below the ear coverts. Their upperparts, tail, breast, and flanks are also slate-gray. Their wings are mostly slate-gray with white tips on the lesser and median coverts and white bases on the inner primaries. Their belly and undertail coverts are white. Adult females have an olive-brown head, upperparts, tail, and wings with the same white on the primaries as males. Their throat and underparts are mostly a paler olive-brown than the upperparts with a creamy buff central belly. Males of subspecies S. s. incerta are larger than the nominate with a thicker bill and little or no white below the ear coverts. Females are like the nominate. Both sexes of S. s. longipennis are slightly paler and more evenly colored than the nominate. Males have little or no white below the ear coverts. Females are more olivaceous with less white on their primaries. Both sexes of all subspecies have a dark iris and dark gray legs. Males have a yellow-orange bill and females a brownish one. Juveniles resemble adult females.

== Distribution and habitat ==
The slate-colored seedeater has a highly disjunct distribution. Not only is each subspecies separate from the others, but each of their ranges also have gaps within them. The subspecies are found thus:

- S. s. schistacea: northern and southern Belize, north-central Guatemala, northwestern and eastern Honduras, and much of the Caribbean slope of Nicaragua; Costa Rica on the Caribbean slope from central Limón Province and the Pacific slope from northern Puntarenas Province south through Panama slightly into northern Colombia
- S. s. incerta: Pacific slope of Colombia's Western Andes from Caldas Department south into northwestern Ecuador spottily as far as Pichincha Province
- S. s. longipennis: formerly in Trinidad; in Venezuela in Sucre, northern Monagas, and northern Delta Amacuro states, spottily in Bolívar state, and single records elsewhere; from Venezuela into Guyana and Suriname (Note: Though most sources say "the Guianas", the South American Classification Committee has no records from French Guiana.) and extreme northwestern Brazil's Roraima; extreme northern Brazil's Amapá; eastern slope of Colombia's Eastern Andes south to Meta Department; and western Brazil's western Amazonas, Acre, and Rondonia states west into most of southeastern Peru's Madre de Dios Department, slightly into adjoining departments with reports as far north as Loreto Department, and continuing into northern Bolivia

There are also scattered records of the species in eastern Ecuador and central Brazil.

The slate-colored seedeater inhabits the edges of humid evergreen forest, secondary forest, and plantations, and especially favors areas with bamboo. In elevation overall it mostly ranges from sea level to 1,500 m (4,900 ft). It reaches 1,000 m (3,300 ft) overall in Central America but only 750 m (2,500 ft) in Belize and Honduras. It reaches 2,000 m (6,600 ft) in Colombia, 1,700 m (5,600 ft) in Peru, 1,000 m (3,300 ft) in Venezuela, and 1,500 m (4,900 ft) in Brazil. In Ecuador its few eastern records are below 400 m (1,300 ft) and in the west it is mostly found between 700 and 1,400 m (2,300 and 4,600 ft).

== Behavior ==
=== Movement ===
Though the slate-colored seedeater is not migratory, it is "eruptive and nomadic", wandering to find areas with seeding bamboo.

=== Feeding ===
The slate-colored seedeater feeds on seeds, especially those of bamboo such as Chusquea species, and those of other grasses. It forages while clinging to the stalk and also on the ground. It usually forages singly or in pairs and sometimes in small flocks.

=== Breeding ===
The slate-colored seedeater breeds in Panama between June and September with most activity in July and August, and its season includes June in Venezuela. Its breeding season elsewhere has not been defined but everywhere seems tied to seeding bamboo. Its nest is a cup made from rootlets and hair. Nests have been found in small trees, spiny palms, vine tangles, and bamboo between about 2 and 5 m (7 and 16 ft) above the ground. The clutch is three eggs that are grayish white with darker markings. The female alone incubates and provides most food for nestlings. The incubation period and time to fledging are not known.

=== Vocalization ===
The slate-colored seedeater's song "often begins with sharp notes and buzzes and ends with high-pitched lisping trill; other versions include sweet lower-pitched whistles interspersed within high-pitched trills". One detailed description is "a high, sibilant, rapid zit, zit, ze'z'z'z'z'ze'ze'tuwee-tuwee-tuee, with variations".

== Status ==
The IUCN has assessed the slate-colored seedeater as being of Least Concern. It has a very large range; it population size is not known and is believed to be decreasing. No immediate threats have been identified. It is considered rare in northern Central America, "rare and irregularly occurring" in Costa Rica, "rather uncommon and enigmatic" in Colombia, "rare and erratic" in Ecuador, "rare and local" in Peru, "rare, unpredictable, and poorly known" in Venezuela, and "uncommon to rare" in Brazil.
