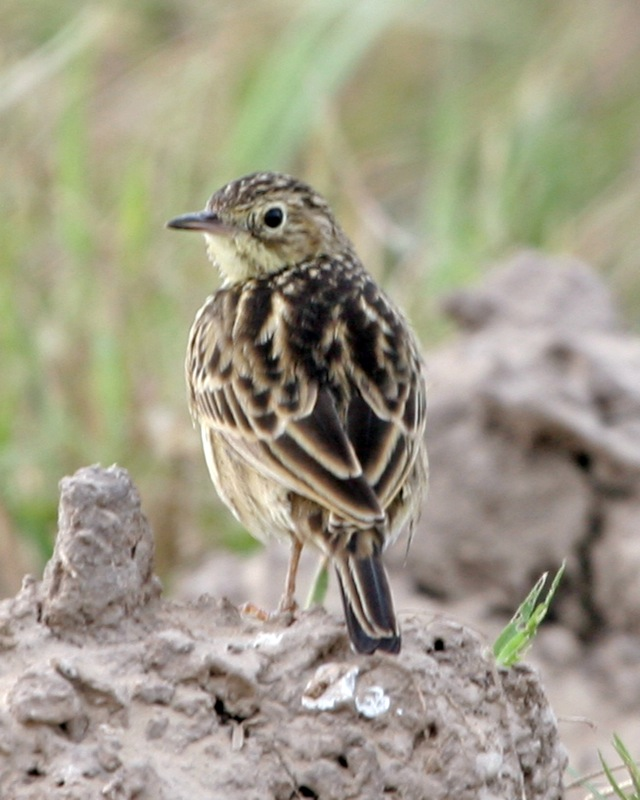

Conservation status
- Least Concern (IUCN 3.1)

Scientific classification
- Kingdom: Animalia
- Phylum: Chordata
- Class: Aves
- Order: Passeriformes
- Family: Motacillidae
- Genus: Anthus
- Species: A. chii

Binomial name
- Anthus chii Vieillot, 1818

Synonyms
- Anthus lutescens Pucheran, 1855

= Yellowish pipit =

Species of bird

The yellowish pipit (Anthus chii) is a species of bird in the family Motacillidae, the wagtails and pipits. It is found in Panama and in every mainland South American country except Ecuador and Chile.

== Taxonomy and systematics ==
The yellowish pipit was described in 1818 with the binomial Anthus chii. For much of the twentieth century and into the twenty-first it bore the binomial Anthus lutescens. A paper published in 2021 showed that by the principle of priority its original binomial was correct and taxonomic systems soon made the change.

The yellowish pipit has two subspecies, the nominate A. c. chii (Vieillot, 1818) and A. c. parvus (Lawrence, 1865). What is now the Peruvian pipit (A. peruvianus) was previously treated as a third subspecies. It was separated based on a study published in 2018.

== Description ==
The yellowish pipit is one of the smallest members of genus Anthus, and is unusually long-legged and short-tailed. It is 10.5 to 14 cm (4.1 to 5.5 in) long and weighs 13 to 18 g (0.46 to 0.63 oz). The sexes have the same plumage. In fresh plumage adults have a dark brown head with a very pale supercilium and a thin white eye-ring. Their upperparts are dark brown with buff-brown feather edges that give a streaked appearance. The sides of their neck have lighter speckles. Their wing coverts have pale tips that show as two wing bars. Their flight feathers are blackish brown with pale edges. Their tail is mostly blackish brown with much white on the outer two pairs of feathers. Their throat and underparts are buffy to yellowish white with dark brown streaks on the flanks and in a band across the breast. Subspecies A. c. parvus is smaller than the nominate. It has cinnamon-buff streaks on its upperparts and is more yellowish and less streaked on its underparts. Both subspecies appear paler and with almost white underparts as their feathers wear. Both subspecies have a dark brown iris, a blackish brown to blackish maxilla, a pink mandible, and pale yellowish to pale brown legs and feet.

== Distribution and habitat ==
The yellowish pipit has a highly disjunct distribution. Subspecies A. c. parvus is found only on the Pacific slope of western Panama. The nominate is found from east of the Andes in northeastern Colombia across much of central Venezuela and extreme northern Brazil into Guyana. One or two populations are in Suriname and French Guiana. Its largest range includes most of Brazil outside the Amazon Basin, extreme southeastern Peru, eastern Bolivia, Paraguay, Uruguay, and northern Argentina south to La Pampa and southeastern Buenos Aires provinces. In Brazil it is found from the mouth of the Amazon in northeastern Pará east to the country's easternmost point. From there its range extends west and south below a line roughly from northern Bahia west to northern Rondônia.

The yellowish pipit is a bird of open landscapes including natural grasslands, pastures, agricultural areas, and cerrado. It favors short grass and areas near lakes, rivers, and other water features. In elevation it is found below 500 m (1,600 ft) in Colombia, below 200 m (700 ft) in Venezuela north of the Orinoco River and below 1,300 m (4,300 ft) south of it, and below 450 m (1,500 ft) in Peru.

== Behavior ==
=== Movement ===
The yellowish pipit is a year-round resident.

=== Feeding ===
The yellowish pipit's diet has not been studied but is known to include insects and thought to also include seeds. It forages while walking and running on the ground.

=== Breeding ===
The yellowish pipit's breeding seasons vary geographically but have not been fully described. In Panama its season spans at least January to June and may include September. In Venezuela it breeds at least in May, June, September, and October. In southeastern Brazil it breeds between July and November with most activity in August and September. The species maintains breeding territories but as many as 10 pairs may nest in a loose colony in the same general area. Males make a display flight in which they climb steeply to about 20 m (65 ft) above the ground, descend steeply, and glide in a straight line to the ground. The species' nest is on the ground and resembles an oven made from dry grass and other coarse fibers lined with finer material. The clutch is two to four eggs that are pale white with brown spots and blotches. In a study in Brazil the incubation period was 13 to 14 days and fledging occurred 13 to 17 days after hatch.

=== Vocalization ===
The yellowish pipit sings during its display flight, "during ascent silent, when gliding back to ground, nasal, slightly cross-sounding, sjiieeuuw, starting very high and thin, lowered, and becoming nasal". Its calls are "a short tsitsirrit, also wisst, and a high, rising squeaky squeet".

== Status ==
The IUCN has assessed the yellowish pipit as being of Least Concern. It has an extremely large range; its estimated population of at least five million mature individuals is believed to be decreasing. No immediate threats have been identified. It is considered common in Colombia, locally common in Venezuela, uncommon in Peru, and "common to frequent" in Brazil. Its range is believed to be increasing due to deforestation.
