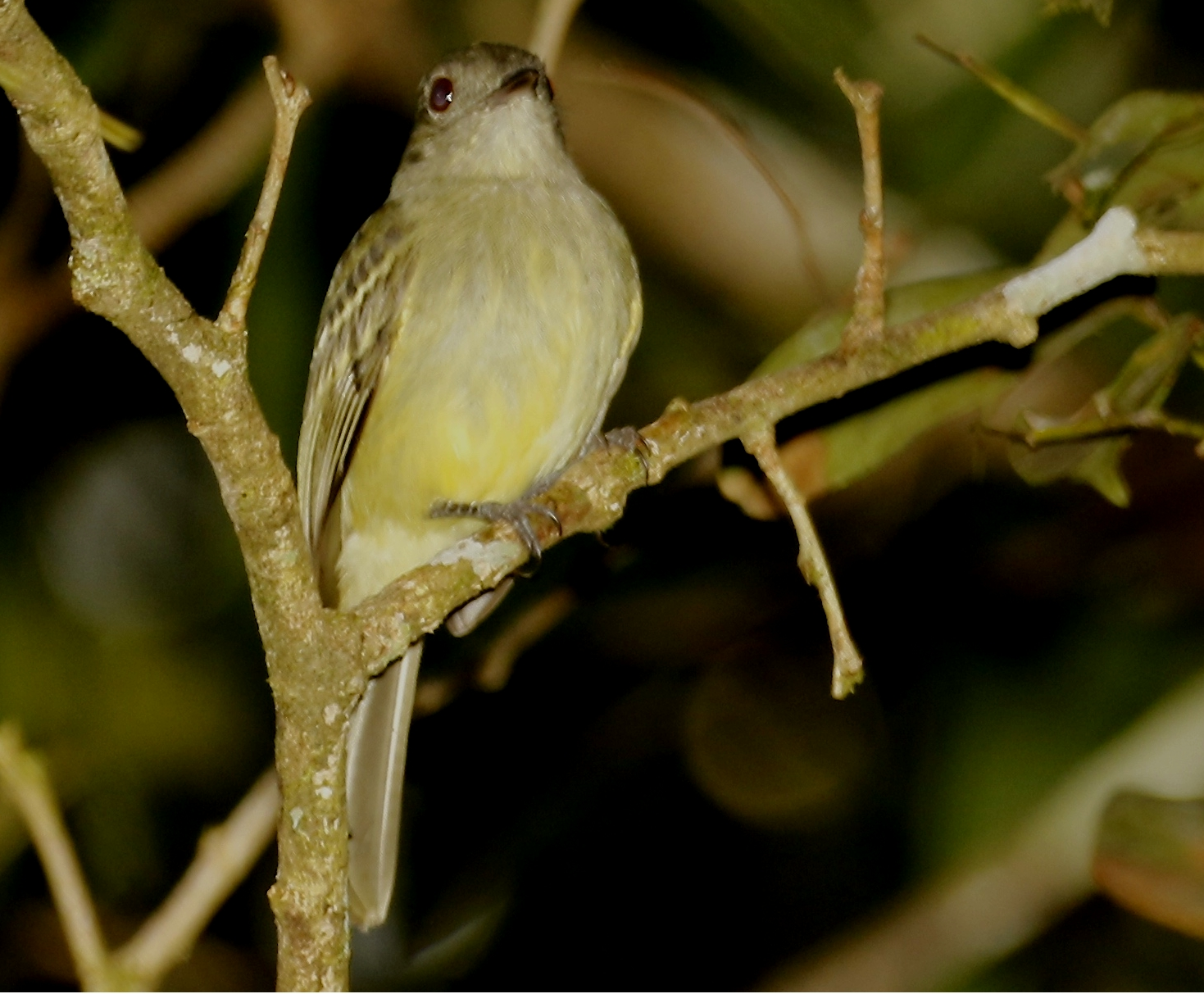

Conservation status
- Least Concern (IUCN 3.1)

Scientific classification
- Kingdom: Animalia
- Phylum: Chordata
- Class: Aves
- Order: Passeriformes
- Family: Tyrannidae
- Genus: Myiopagis
- Species: M. flavivertex

Binomial name
- Myiopagis flavivertex (Sclater, PL, 1887)

= Yellow-crowned elaenia =

Species of bird

The yellow-crowned elaenia (Myiopagis flavivertex) is a species of bird in subfamily Elaeniinae of family Tyrannidae, the tyrant flycatchers. It is found in Brazil, Colombia, Ecuador, French Guiana, Guyana, Peru, Suriname, and Venezuela.

== Taxonomy and systematics ==
The yellow-crowned elaenia was originally described as Elaenia flavivertex. It was moved to genus Myiopagis in the mid twentieth century and later confirmed by genetic analysis to belong there. The yellow-crowned elaenia is monotypic.

== Description ==
The yellow-crowned elaenia is 12.5 to 13 cm (4.9 to 5.1 in) long and weighs about 12 g (0.42 oz). The sexes have the same plumage. Adults have a dark brownish olive crown with a large but partially concealed bright yellow stripe along its middle. They have an indistinct whitish loral spot and supercilium; their lower face is grayish olive. Their upperparts are olive. Their wings are dusky olive with bright yellow edges on the inner flight feathers and tips on the coverts; the last form two bars on the closed wing. Their tail is olive. Their throat is whitish, their breast yellow with an olive wash, and their belly bright yellow. Both sexes have a dark brown iris, a short black bill with a pinkish base to the mandible, and gray legs and feet.

== Distribution and habitat ==
The yellow-crowned elaenia has a disjunct distribution. One population is found in the northeastern Venezuelan states of Monagas and Delta Amacuro. Another is found in the southern Venezuelan state of Amazonas and very slightly into Guainía Department in extreme eastern Colombia. A third is found in Sucumbíos and northern Orellana provinces of northeastern Ecuador, the northeastern quadrant of Peru, and slightly into far western Brazil. The fourth population has the largest range. It is found across the Guianas north of the Guianan Shield into northeastern Brazil and along the Amazon and its tributary the Madeira River from Amazonas state and Rondônia east to the Atlantic. The species primarily inhabits várzea and swampy flooded forest along large watercoureses. In Venezuela and the Guianas it also inhabits flooded forest growing on sandy soils. In elevation it reaches from sea level up to about 300 m (1,000 ft).

== Behavior ==
=== Movement ===
The yellow-crowned elaenia is believed to be a year-round resident throughout its range.

=== Feeding ===
The yellow-crowned elaenia's diet has not been studied, but it is known to include insects. It typically forages singly or in pairs in the forest understory to mid-story, and seldom joins mixed-species feeding flocks. It typically captures prey from vegetation with short sallies from a perch.

=== Breeding ===
Nothing is known about the yellow-crowned elaenia's breeding biology.

=== Vocalization ===
The yellow-crowned elaenia's song is a "very high, sweeping note, followed by a short downslurred shiver ('srrr'), then decelerating to 'wee-tju', the total as 'chee srrr-wee-tju' ".

== Status ==
The IUCN has assessed the yellow-crowned elaenia as being of Least Concern. It has a large range; its population size is not known and is believed to be decreasing. No immediate threats have been identified. It is considered uncommon to locally fairly common but "[g]enerally overlooked until its voice is known". It occurs in several protected areas.
