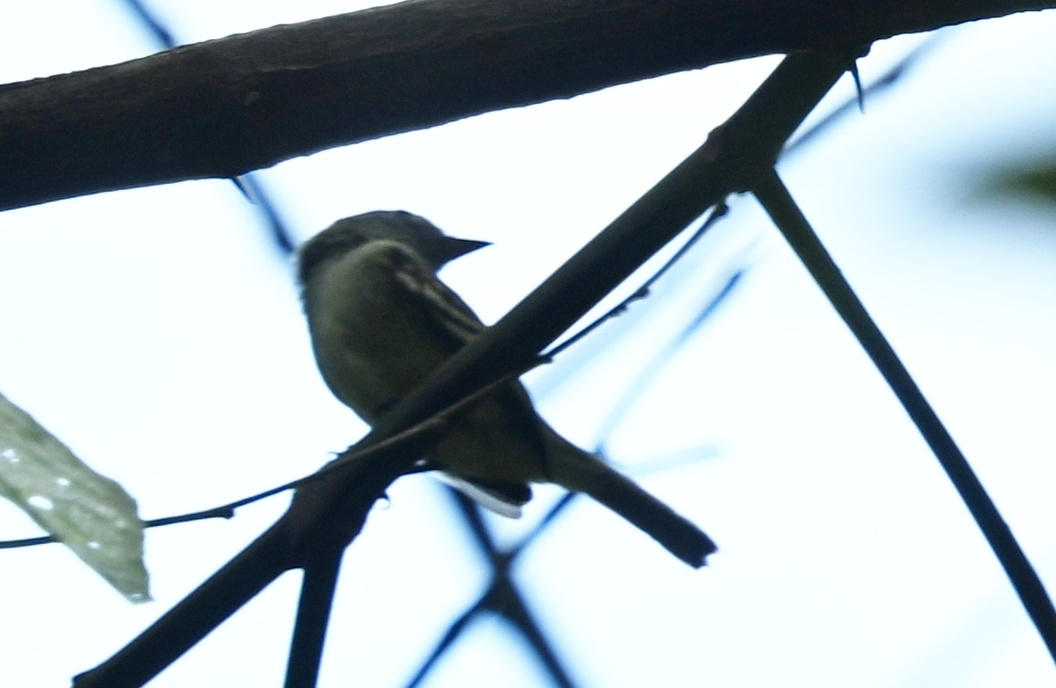

Conservation status
- Least Concern (IUCN 3.1)

Scientific classification
- Kingdom: Animalia
- Phylum: Chordata
- Class: Aves
- Order: Passeriformes
- Family: Tyrannidae
- Genus: Myiopagis
- Species: M. parambae

Binomial name
- Myiopagis parambae (Hellmayr, 1904)

Synonyms
- Serpophaga parambae; Myiopagis caniceps parambae; Elaenia caniceps parambae

= Choco elaenia =

Species of bird

The Choco elaenia or Choco grey elaenia (Myiopagis parambae) is a species of bird in subfamily Elaeniinae of family Tyrannidae, the tyrant flycatchers. It is found in Colombia, Ecuador, and Panama.

== Taxonomy and systematics ==
What is now the Choco elaenia was originally described as Serpophaga parambae. It was soon moved into Myiopagis as a subspecies of the then grey elaenia (M. caniceps); soon thereafter Myiopagis was merged into genus Elaenia. That move was reversed in the mid-twentieth century, and Myiopagis was confirmed by genetic analysis to be the grey elaenia's proper genus.

The Choco elaenia's further taxonomy is unsettled. BirdLife International's Handbook of the Birds of the World split it and the Amazonian elaenia (M. cinerea) from the former grey elaenia in December 2016, calling them the Choco grey, Amazonian grey, and Atlantic grey elaenias respectively. The Clements taxonomy recognized the split in November 2022 and the International Ornithological Committee (IOC) followed suit in January 2023. These systems named the three species the Choco, Amazonian, and grey(gray)-headed elaenias (M. caniceps sensu stricto) respectively. As of September 2024 neither the North nor South American Classification Committees of the American Ornithological Society had recognized the split though the South American committee is soliciting a proposal to do so.

Clements and the IOC assign the Choco elaenia two subspecies, the nominate M. p. parambae (Hellmayr, 1904) and M. p. absita (Wetmore, 1963).

== Description ==
The Choco elaenia is 12 to 13 cm (4.7 to 5.1 in) long. Adult males of the nominate subspecies have a dark gray crown with a partially concealed white stripe along its middle. They have a thin grayish white loral spot that continues around the eye and a grizzled whitish lower face. Their upperparts are blue-gray. Their wings are black with white edges on the inner flight feathers and white tips on the coverts; the last form two bars on the closed wing. Their tail is gray with white tips on the feathers. Their throat and underparts are whitish. Adult females have a slightly darker crown than the nominate, with grayish green upperparts, yellowish edges on the flight feathers, a blacker tail with grayish green edges on the feathers, and a slight yellow cast on the belly. Males of subspecies M. p. absita are slightly darker overall and have more white on the wings than the nominate; females have brighter yellow underparts. Both sexes of both subspecies have a dark brown iris, a short blackish bill, and dark gray to blackish legs and feet.

== Distribution and habitat ==
The nominate subspecies of the Choco elaenia is found in the Chocó bioregion for the length of western Colombia and into northwestern Ecuador south as far as Pichincha Province. Subspecies M. p. absita is found in central and eastern Panama between central Colón and eastern Darién provinces. The species inhabits the canopy and edges of dry to humid forest. In elevation it occurs from sea level to 500 m (1,600 ft) in Panama, to 900 m (3,000 ft) in Colombia, and to 400 m (1,300 ft) in Ecuador.

== Behavior ==
=== Movement ===
Subspecies M. p. absita of the Choco elaenia is a year-round resident in its range. The nominate subspecies might make some elevational movements, at least in southwestern Colombia.

=== Feeding ===
The Choco elaenia is assumed to feed on insects and small fruits like others of its genus. It typically forages in the forest canopy and high on its outer edges, taking food by gleaning from a perch. It is not known to join mixed-species feeding flocks.

=== Breeding ===
Nothing is known about the Choco elaenia's breeding biology. However, it is thought to be similar to that of its former parent the grey, now grey-headed, elania, which see here.

=== Vocalization ===
The Choco elaenia's song is a "fast series of high-pitched notes that drop slightly in pitch and accelerate towards the end". It has been written as "swee swee swee wee-ee-ee-ee-ee-ee-ee-ee-ee".

== Status ==
The IUCN has assessed the Choco elaenia as being of Least Concern. It has a large range; its population size is not known and is believed to be decreasing. No immediate threats have been identified. It is considered rare and local in Panama and uncommon in Colombia and Ecuador.
