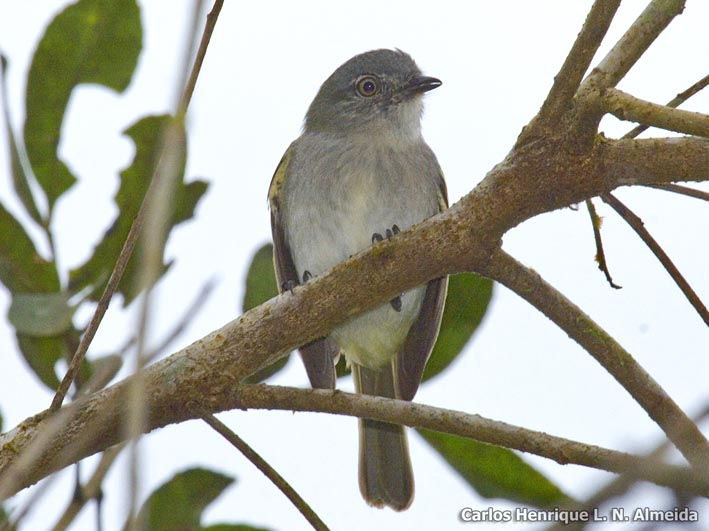
- At Ubatuba, São Paulo, Brazil

Conservation status
- Least Concern (IUCN 3.1)

Scientific classification
- Kingdom: Animalia
- Phylum: Chordata
- Class: Aves
- Order: Passeriformes
- Family: Tyrannidae
- Genus: Myiopagis
- Species: M. caniceps

Binomial name
- Myiopagis caniceps (Swainson, 1835)

Synonyms
- Tyrannula caniceps; Elaenia caniceps

= Gray-headed elaenia =

Species of bird

The grey-headed elaenia or Atlantic grey elaenia (Myiopagis caniceps) is a species of bird in subfamily Elaeniinae of family Tyrannidae, the tyrant flycatchers. It is found in Argentina, Bolivia, Brazil, and Paraguay.

== Taxonomy and systematics ==
What is now the grey-headed elaenia was originally called the "straw-crested flycatcher" (Tyrannula caniceps). It was later moved into genus Myiopagis and called the grey elaenia. Soon thereafter Myiopagis was merged into genus Elaenia and other taxa were moved from species status to become subspecies of it. The move into Elaenia was reversed in the mid-twentieth century, and Myiopagis was confirmed by genetic analysis to be the grey elaenia's proper genus.

The grey-headed elaenia's further taxonomy is unsettled. BirdLife International's Handbook of the Birds of the World split all but the nominate subspecies M. c. caniceps from it in December 2016, calling the resulting species the Atlantic grey, Choco grey, and Amazonian grey elaenias. The Clements taxonomy recognized the split in November 2022 and the International Ornithological Committee (IOC) followed suit in January 2023. These systems named the three species the grey(gray)-headed (M. caniceps sensu stricto), Choco (M. parambae), and Amazonian (M. cinerea) elaenias. As of September 2024 neither the North nor South American Classification Committees of the American Ornithological Society had recognized the split though the South American committee is soliciting a proposal to do so.

The grey-headed elaenia is monotypic.

== Description ==
The grey-headed elaenia is 12 to 14 cm (4.7 to 5.5 in) long and weighs 9.5 to 17 g (0.34 to 0.60 oz). Adult males have a medium gray crown with a partially concealed white stripe along its middle. They have an indistinct whitish loral spot and a grizzled whitish lower face. Their upperparts are olive gray. Their wings are black with white edges on the inner flight feathers and white tips on the coverts; the last form two bars on the closed wing. Their tail is grayish. Their throat is white, their breast pale gray, and their belly grayish white. Adult females are smaller than males. They have a medium gray crown and nape with a pale yellow strip on their crown. Their upperparts are bright greenish olive. Their wings are black with pale to bright yellow where the male is white. Their tail is grayish. Their throat and breast are pale gray and their belly grayish white with a pale yellow wash. Both sexes have a brown iris with males having in addition a white ring around it, a short black bill with a lighter base to the mandible, and grayish black to black legs and feet.

== Distribution and habitat ==
The grey-headed elaenia is found in northeastern, southern, and southeastern Brazil from Maranhão to Ceará south to northern Rio Grande do Sul. Its range continues south and west from there through southern Bolivia into extreme northwestern Argentina and into eastern Paraguay and northeastern Argentina's Misiones Province. It inhabits the canopy of a variety of forested landscapes including dry forest, gallery forest, cerradão, and dry semi-deciduous woodlands. It has also been noted in regrowing vegetation within Eucalyptus plantations. In elevation it ranges from sea level to 1,200 m (3,900 ft) in Brazil.

== Behavior ==
=== Movement ===
The grey-headed elaenia is a year-round resident in most of its range. However, there is evidence that the southernmost individuals move northward for the austral winter.

=== Feeding ===
The grey-headed elaenia feeds on insects and small fruits like others of its genus. It typically forages in the forest canopy and high on its outer edges, taking food from foliage and twigs by gleaning from a perch and while briefly hovering. It regularly joins mixed-species feeding flocks.

=== Breeding ===
The grey-headed elaenia breeds between September and January in Brazil and Argentina. Its nest is an open cup made from plant fibers with lichens, moss, and small leaves on the outside and lined with feathers. The clutch size is two eggs that are creamy white with brown markings. The incubation period, time to fledging, and details of parental care are not known.

=== Vocalization ===
The grey-headed elaenia's main vocalization is a "series of varying length, starting with 2-4 single/extr. high notes, then gliding down and accelerating to a long trill, slowing down and often finishing with some up-and-down, lilting notes". The species typically vocalizes the most in the early morning but continues intermittently all day; it vocalizes from the forest canopy.

== Status ==
The IUCN has assessed the grey-headed elaenia as being of Least Concern. It has a very large range; its population size is not known and is believed to be decreasing. No immediate threats have been identified. It occurs in many protected areas both public and private. However, "[i]n some portions of its range, particularly in northeastern Brazil (where it was formerly common), forests have been devastated and reduced to tiny fragments".
