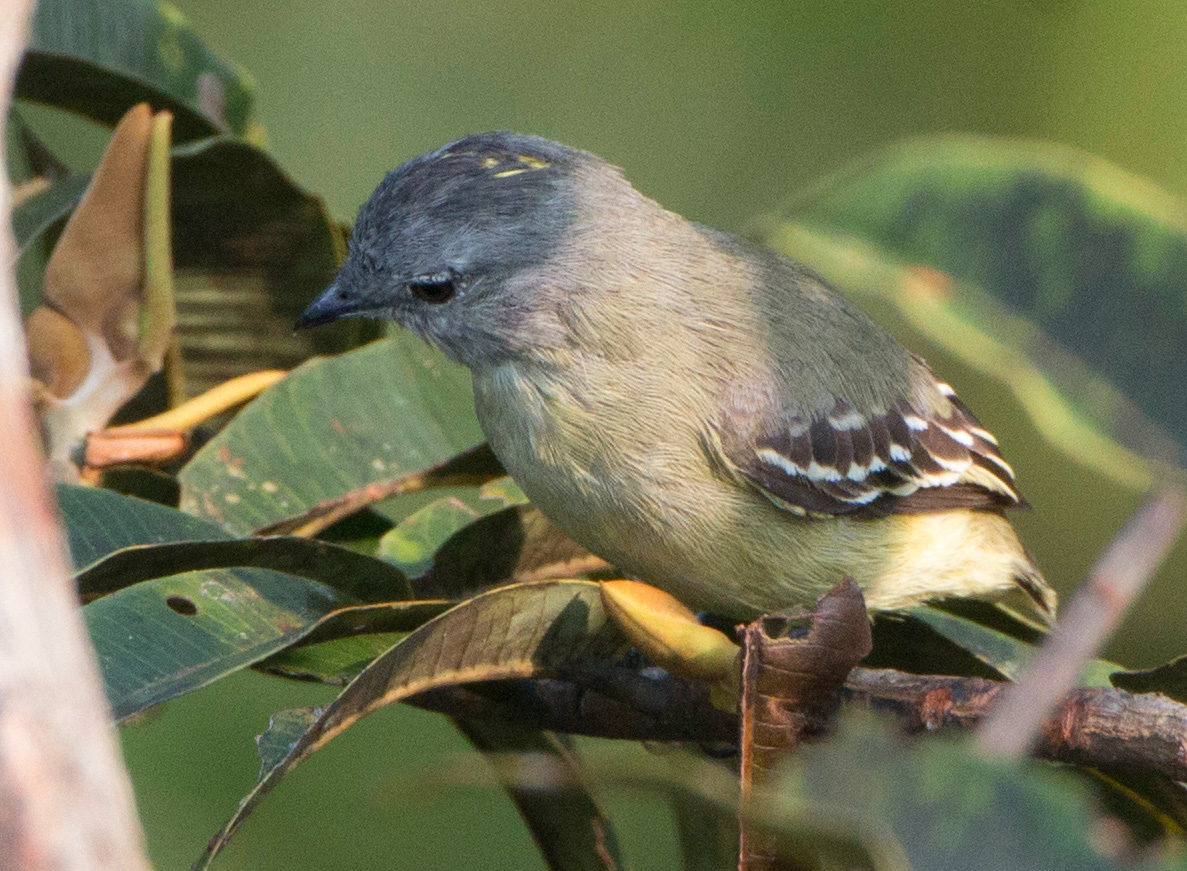

Conservation status
- Least Concern (IUCN 3.1)

Scientific classification
- Kingdom: Animalia
- Phylum: Chordata
- Class: Aves
- Order: Passeriformes
- Family: Tyrannidae
- Genus: Myiopagis
- Species: M. cinerea

Binomial name
- Myiopagis cinerea (Pelzeln, 1868)

Synonyms
- Elainea cinerea; Myiopagis caniceps cinerea; Elaenia caniceps cinerea

= Amazonian elaenia =

Species of bird

The Amazonian elaenia or Amazonian grey elaenia (Myiopagis cinerea) is a species of bird in subfamily Elaeniinae of family Tyrannidae, the tyrant flycatchers. It is found in every mainland South American country except Argentina, Chile, Paraguay, and Uruguay, though there is only a single sight record in Suriname.

== Taxonomy and systematics ==
What is now the Amazonian elaenia was originally described as Elainea[sic] cinerea. It was later moved into Myiopagis as a subspecies of the then grey elaenia (M. caniceps); soon thereafter Myiopagis was merged into genus Elaenia. That move was reversed in the mid-twentieth century, and Myiopagis was confirmed by genetic analysis to be the grey elaenia's proper genus.

The Amazonian elaenia's further taxonomy is unsettled. BirdLife International's Handbook of the Birds of the World split it and the Choco elaenia (M. parambae) from the former grey elaenia in December 2016, calling them the Amazonian grey, Choco grey, and Atlantic grey elaenias respectively. The Clements taxonomy recognized the split in November 2022 and the International Ornithological Committee (IOC) followed suit in January 2023. These systems named the three species the Amazonian, Choco, and grey(gray)-headed elaenias (M. caniceps sensu stricto) respectively. As of September 2024 neither the North nor South American Classification Committees of the American Ornithological Society had recognized the split though the South American committee (SACC) is soliciting a proposal to do so.

The Amazonian elaenia is monotypic.

== Description ==
The Amazonian elaenia is 12 to 13 cm (4.7 to 5.1 in) long and weighs about 11 g (0.39 oz). Adult males have a dark gray crown with a partially concealed white stripe along its middle. They have a thin grayish white loral spot that continues around the eye and a grizzled whitish lower face. Their upperparts are blue-gray. Their wings are black with white edges on the inner flight feathers and white tips on the coverts; the last form two bars on the closed wing. Their tail is gray with white tips on the feathers. Their throat and underparts are mostly pale gray with a white belly. Adult females have a yellow strip on their crown, with bright olive-green upperparts, yellowish wing bars and edges on the flight feathers, and mostly greenish yellow underparts with a yellow belly. Both sexes have a dark brown iris, a short blackish bill, and dark gray legs and feet.

== Distribution and habitat ==
The Amazonian elaenia is found in the Amazon Basin in eastern Colombia, Ecuador, and Peru, in northern Bolivia, in southern Venezuela, Guyana, and French Guiana, and in roughly the northwestern half of Brazil. An unconfirmed sight record in Suriname lead the SACC to class it as hypothetical in that country. The species inhabits terra firme and várzea tropical evergreen forest, both primary and secondary of all ages. In elevation it reaches 1,200 m (3,900 ft) in Colombia, 600 m (2,000 ft) in Ecuador, 700 m (2,300 ft) in Peru, and 1,200 m (3,900 ft) in Venezuela though mostly below 300 m (1,000 ft) there.

== Behavior ==
=== Movement ===
The Amazonian elaenia is a year-round resident in most of its range. However, there is evidence that it occurs in Bolivia only in the austral winter, and there might be some slight movement into far northwestern Venezuela.

=== Feeding ===
The Amazonian elaenia is assumed to feed on insects and small fruits like others of its genus. It typically forages in the forest canopy and high on its outer edges, taking food from foliage and twigs by gleaning from a perch and while briefly hovering. It frequently joins mixed-species feeding flocks.

=== Breeding ===
Nothing is known about the Amazonian elaenia's breeding biology. However, it is thought to be similar to that of its former parent the grey, now grey-headed, elania, which see here.

=== Vocalization ===
The Amazonian elaenia's two principal vocalizations are "a musical, descending, springy phrase: TSEE'SEE'see'see'see'sew" and a "somewhat sneezy tsee tsee TSEW-tsee-TSEW". They have also been written as "e-e-p-p-p-pepepepe ... pepepepupupupupu" and "ee-ee-ee-pit-chew, pit-chew, pee-chew" respectively. The species typically vocalizes the most in the early morning but continues intermittently all day; it vocalizes from the forest canopy.

== Status ==
The IUCN has assessed the Amazonian elaenia as being of Least Concern. It has a very large range; its population size is not known and is believed to be decreasing. No immediate threats have been identified. It is considered uncommon in Colombia, "uncommon and local (under-recorded?)" in Ecuador, and "uncommon but widespread" in Peru. There are very few records in Venezuela. "In general, it is easily overlooked due to its inconspicuousness and tendency to forage within canopy flocks."
