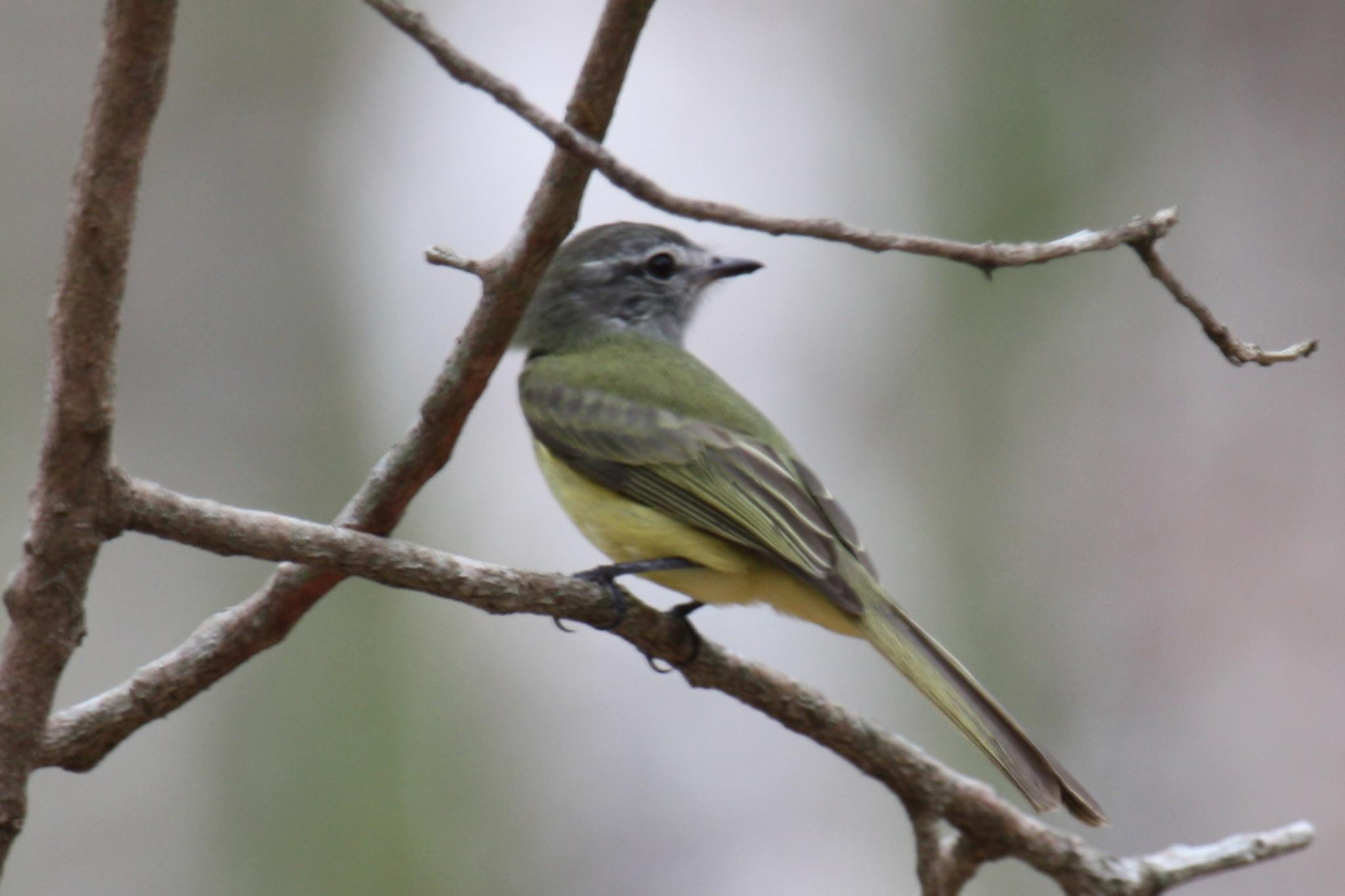

Conservation status
- Least Concern (IUCN 3.1)

Scientific classification
- Kingdom: Animalia
- Phylum: Chordata
- Class: Aves
- Order: Passeriformes
- Family: Tyrannidae
- Genus: Myiopagis
- Species: M. viridicata

Binomial name
- Myiopagis viridicata (Vieillot, 1817)

Synonyms
- Sylvia viridicata (protonym)

= Greenish elaenia =

Species of bird

The greenish elaenia (Myiopagis viridicata) is a species of bird in subfamily Elaeniinae of family Tyrannidae, the tyrant flycatchers. It is found in Mexico, every Central American country, and every mainland South American country except Chile and French Guiana. It has also occurred as a vagrant in southern Texas.

== Taxonomy and systematics ==
The greenish elaenia has these 10 subspecies:

- M. v. jaliscensis Nelson, 1900
- M. v. minima Nelson, 1898
- M. v. placens (Sclater, PL, 1859)
- M. v. pacifica (Brodkorb, 1943)
- M. v. accola Bangs, 1902
- M. v. pallens Bangs, 1902
- M. v. restricta Todd, 1952
- M. v. zuliae Zimmer, JT & Phelps, WH, 1955
- M. v. implacens (Sclater, PL, 1862)
- M. v. viridicata (Vieillot, 1817)

The subspecies found north and west of the Andes (M. v. jaliscensis through M. v. pallens in the above list) differ genetically from the others and might better be treated as a separate species.

== Description ==
The greenish elaenia is 13 to 14 cm (5.1 to 5.5 in) long and weighs 11 to 13 g (0.39 to 0.46 oz). The sexes have essentially the same plumage. Adults of the nominate subspecies M. v. viridicata have a greenish olive crown with a faint grayish tinge and a partially concealed bright yellow stripe along its middle. (Males have a larger yellow patch than females.) Adults have a dark loral streak, a whitish gray supercilium, a partial white eyering, and grizzled whitish ear coverts. Their upperparts are olive-green. Their wings are dusky with yellowish edges on the inner flight feathers and tips on the coverts. Their tail is dusky olive. Their throat is pale gray to whitish, their breast pale grayish white with variable light olive streaks, and their belly and undertail coverts pale yellow. Both sexes of all subspecies have a dark brown to reddish brown iris, a short brownish black or black bill with a lighter base to the mandible, and blackish to dark gray legs and feet.

The other subspecies of the greenish elaenia differ only slightly from the nominate and each other. The differences are:

- M. v. jaliscensis: paler than all of the others
- M. v. minima: smaller than all the others
- M. v. placens: brighter green upperparts than nominate
- M. v. pacifica duller olive upperparts and paler yellow belly than nominate
- M. v. accola: brighter green upperparts and larger bill than nominate
- M. v. pallens: similar to accola but slightly paler overall
- M. v. restricta: similar to pallens but somewhat larger
- M. v. zuliae: brighter green upperparts and brighter yellow belly than nominate
- M. v. implacens: smaller than pallens, restricta, and zuliae; black on the edges of the crown, brighter green back and brighter yellow on the flight feathers and wing coverts than nominate

== Distribution and habitat ==
The greenish elaenia has a significantly disjunct distribution. The subspecies are found thus:

- M. v. jaliscensis: western Mexico from southern Durango and Nayarit south to Guerrero and southern Oaxaca
- M. v. minima: Tres Marías Islands off Nayarit, Mexico
- M. v. placens Caribbean slope from Tamaulipas in northeastern Mexico south through Belize and Guatemala into Honduras, including the Yucatán Peninsula and Cozumel Island
- M. v. pacifica: Pacific slope from Chiapas in southern Mexico south through Guatemala and El Salvador to Honduras
- M. v. accola: from Nicaragua south on Pacific slope through Costa Rica and Panama into northern Colombia and northern Táchira in northwestern Venezuela
- M. v. pallens: Colombia; the Sierra Nevada de Santa Marta and surrounding area and the valleys of the Cauca and Magdalena rivers
- M. v. restricta: Venezuela east of the Andes and north of the Amazon River and into Guyana and Suriname
- M. v. zuliae: Serranía del Perijá on the Colombia-Venezuela border
- M. v. implacens: from Nariño Department in southwestern Colombia south through western Ecuador just into Tumbes Department in far northwestern Peru
- M. v. viridicata: southeastern Peru, northern and eastern Bolivia, central, eastern, and southeastern Brazil, eastern Paraguay, northeastern Argentina, and far northern Uruguay

The greenish elaenia inhabits a wide variety of landscapes, most of them wooded, with no particular concentration in one or a few in most of its range. The landscapes include humid tropical evergreen forest, gallery forest, semi-deciduous and deciduous forest, taller scrublands, mature secondary forest, and citrus and coffee plantations. It does favor várzea in Peru. In elevation it reaches 1,500 m (4,900 ft) in Mexico and Central America, to 1,200 m (3,900 ft) in Colombia, mostly to 500 m (1,600 ft) but locally to 1,000 m (3,300 ft) in Ecuador, to 1,000 m (3,300 ft) in Peru, to 1,000 m (3,300 ft) in western Venezuela and 300 m (1,000 ft) east of the Andes there, and to 1,100 m (3,600 ft) in Brazil.

== Behavior ==
=== Movement ===
Most of the subspecies of the greenish elaenia are year-round residents in their respective ranges. The nominate M. v. viridicata is not. The populations that breed in Argentina, southern Bolivia, southern Brazil, Paraguay, and Uruguay move north for the austral winter. At the other extreme the subspecies is present in Peru, northern Bolivia, and Brazil north of Bolivia only in winter.

=== Feeding ===
The greenish elaenia feeds mostly on insects but includes fruits, seeds, and insect eggs in its diet. It forages from the forest understory to its canopy, usually singly or in pairs, and occasionally joins mixed-species feeding flocks. It typically feeds by hover-gleaning from vegetation and with short sallies from a perch.

=== Breeding ===
The greenish elaenia's breeding season varies geographically. In Mexico it breeds between April and August, in much of Central America between April and June, and between October and March in southern Brazil. Its season in Colombia includes March to August and that in eastern Venezuela includes November. The species' nest is a shallow cup made of twigs, rootlets, other plant fibers, and spider silk; the female alone builds it. It is typically placed in a branch fork or elbow, and between 4 and 10 m (13 and 33 ft) above the ground. The clutch is two eggs that are white with pale violet and brown speckles. Both parents have been observed feeding nestlings. The incubation period, time to fledging, and other details of parental care are not known.

=== Vocalization ===
The greenish elaenia's dawn songs and daytime calls seem to fall into four groups. The population in western Mexico sings a "high-pitched sweet tsewee-tseee....g'tseewe...tsewee-tseee...g'tseewe.... typically alternating a two-note and a one-note phrase". Its call is a "high-pitched two-note descending tsee-tseeu". The population in eastern Mexico sings a "moderately high pitched g'tswee-ee-ut... g'tswee-ee-ut.... Repeated phrase starts with an initial hiccup and is followed by a drawn-out modulated whistle with a distinct up and down ending". Its call is a "drawn-out descending whistle tseeeeuw". Subspecies M. v. accola in Central and northwestern South America sings an "alternating series of burry phrases, g'prreeuw...rrreeuh...g'prreeuw...rrreeuh...". Its calls are quite variable "but typically are very buzzy, short, and mostly overslurred". The central and southern South American population sings a "repeated burry phrase tsrrreweh.urrh...tsrrreweh.urrh... . First note of the phrase is underslurred and mainly burry in the first half, second note is much shorter, fainter and is sometimes lacking". Its calls are also variable but most "seem to fall into two categories: a short modulated note tsee-wee and a short descending whistle tseee".

== Status ==
The IUCN has assessed the greenish elaenia as being of Least Concern. It has an extremely large range; its estimated population of at least 500,000 mature individuals is believed to be decreasing. No immediate threats have been identified. It is considered uncommon to common but often overlooked and occurs in many public and private protected areas. "Because Greenish Elaenia is so widely distributed, has a large population size, and stable population pattern, human activity has little effect on populations in the short term. In the long term, continued habitat loss could affect particular subspecies."
