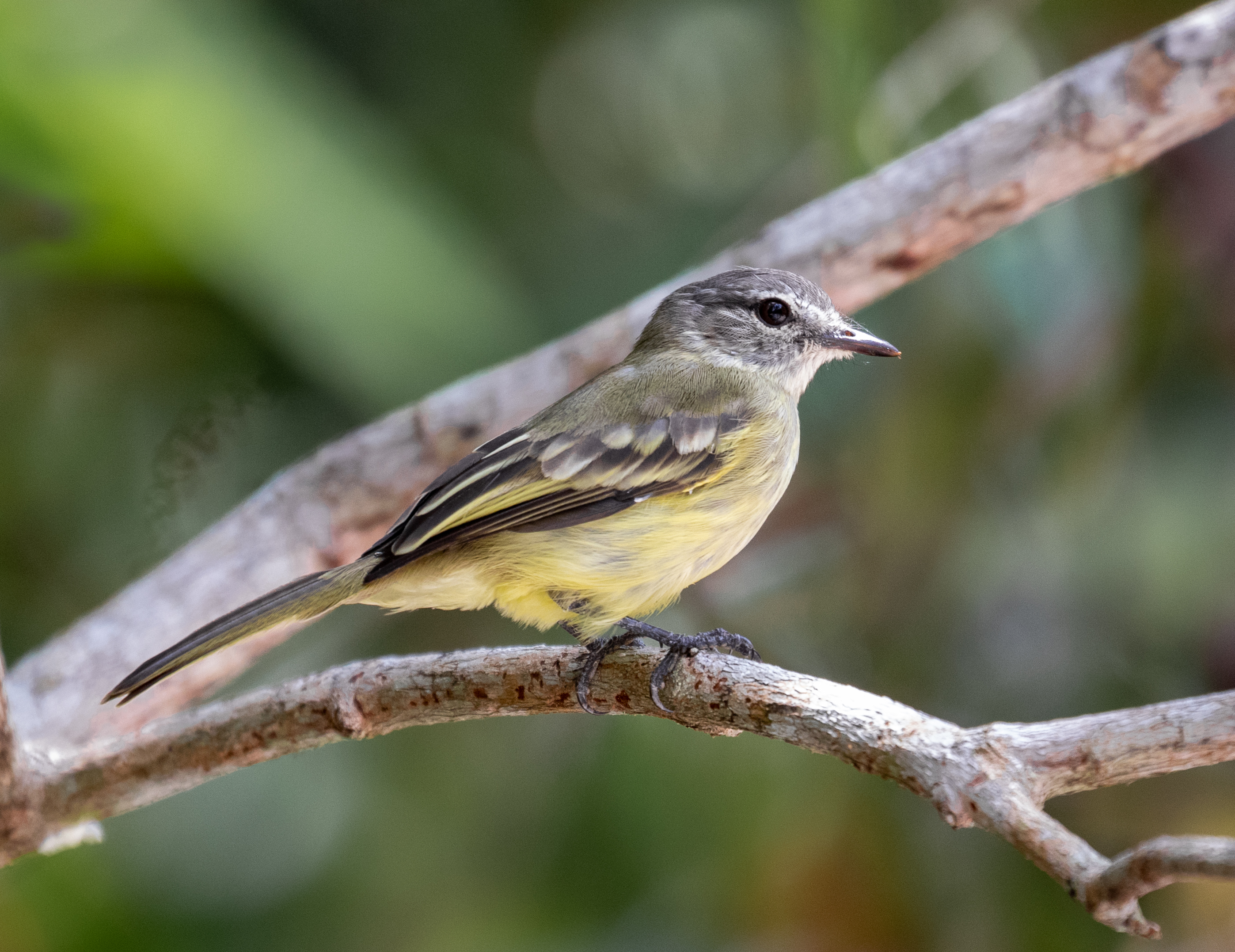

Conservation status
- Least Concern (IUCN 3.1)

Scientific classification
- Kingdom: Animalia
- Phylum: Chordata
- Class: Aves
- Order: Passeriformes
- Family: Tyrannidae
- Genus: Myiopagis
- Species: M. gaimardii

Binomial name
- Myiopagis gaimardii (d'Orbigny, 1840)

Subspecies
- M. gaimardii gaimardii; M. gaimardii macilvainii; M. gaimardii trinitatis; M. gaimardii bogotensis; M. gaimardii guianensis; M. gaimardii subcinereus

= Forest elaenia =

Species of bird

The forest elaenia (Myiopagis gaimardii) is a small passerine bird in the tyrant flycatcher family. It breeds from Panama through Colombia, Venezuela and the Guianas to Bolivia and Brazil. It also occurs on Trinidad.

== Description ==
This species is found in forests and the edges of mangrove swamps. The nest is a shallow cup of roots, bark and grass built in a tree. The typical clutch is two cream-coloured eggs marked with rufous and lavender.

The adult forest elaenia is 12.7 cm long and weighs 12.2g. The head has a blackish crown with a partly concealed white or pale yellow central stripe, a weak whitish supercilium and white eyering. The upperparts are olive-green, and the brown wings have yellow feather edging and two yellow wing bars. The throat is whitish and the breast is greenish-yellow shading to yellow on the belly. The long narrow bill is black above and pink-based below. Sexes are similar.

M. g. trinitatis, the subspecies endemic to Trinidad, is larger and has duller upper parts than mainland forms.

Forest elaenias are seen alone or in pairs, perched inconspicuously or catching insects and spiders in higher levels of the foliage. They also frequently eat berries. They have a sharp pitch-weep call.
