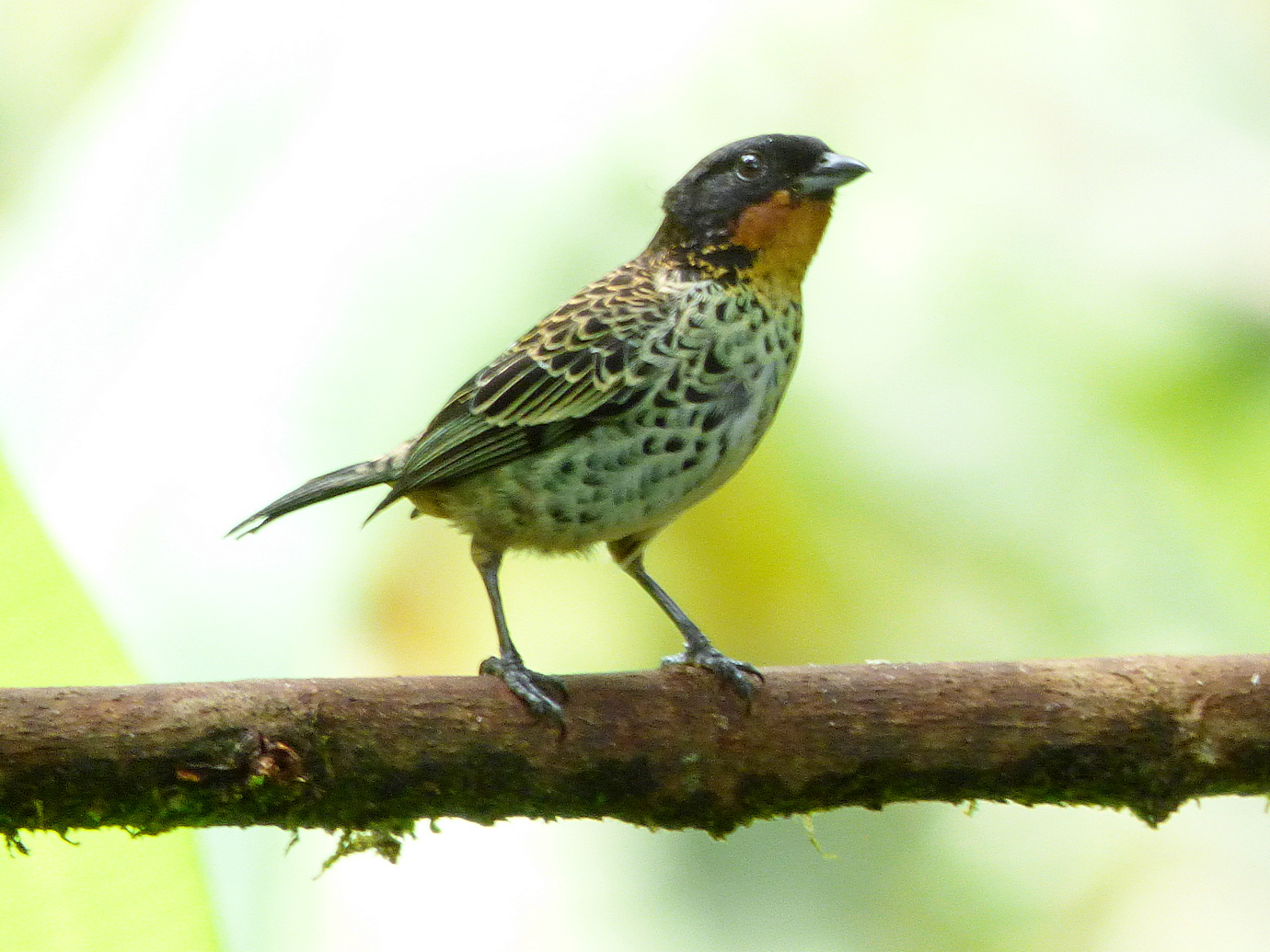
- Rufous-throated tanager (Ixothraupis rufigula)

Scientific classification
- Kingdom: Animalia
- Phylum: Chordata
- Class: Aves
- Order: Passeriformes
- Family: Thraupidae
- Genus: Ixothraupis; Bonaparte, 1851

Type species
- Tanagra punctata Linnaeus, 1766

Species
- See text

= Ixothraupis =

Genus of birds

Ixothraupis is a genus of Neotropical birds in the tanager family Thraupidae.

== Taxonomy and species list ==
These species were formerly placed in the genus Tangara. A molecular phylogenetic study published in 2014 found that Tangara was polyphyletic. In the rearrangement to create monophyletic genera, the genus Ixothraupis was resurrected. It had been introduced by the French naturalist Charles Lucien Bonaparte in 1851 with the spotted tanager as the type species. The name combines the Ancient Greek ixos meaning "mistletoe" with "thraupis", an unknown small bird.

The genus contains the following five species:

Genus Ixothraupis – Bonaparte, 1851 – five species
Common name	Scientific name and subspecies	Range	Size and ecology	IUCN status and estimated population
Dotted tanager	Ixothraupis varia (Statius Müller, 1776)	Brazil, French Guiana, Suriname and Venezuela	Size: Habitat: Subtropical or tropical moist lowland forests and heavily degraded former forest Diet:	LC
Rufous-throated tanager	Ixothraupis rufigula (Bonaparte, 1851)	Colombia and Ecuador	Size: Habitat: Subtropical or tropical moist montane forests and heavily degraded former forest Diet:	LC
Spotted tanager	Ixothraupis punctata (Linnaeus, 1766) Five subspecies: I. p. punctata (Linnaeus, 1766); I. p. zamorae (Chapman, 1925); I. p. perenensis (Chapman, 1925); I. p. annectens (Zimmer, JT, 1943); I. p. punctulata (Sclater, PL & Salvin, 1876)	Disjunct distribution in Bolivia, Brazil, Ecuador, French Guiana, Guyana, Peru, Suriname and Venezuela: the Amazon (Brazil, the Guianas and southern Venezuela) and the Andes (northern Ecuador south through Peru into Bolivia)	Size: Habitat: Lowland tropical forests, including terra firme and savanna forest, in the Amazon, and montane forests, including mossy forests, in the Andes; also woodland edges, secondary forests and plantations; in the Amazon most abundant below 1,100 m (3,600 ft) but up to 1,600 m (5,200 ft), in the Andes largely 700–1,700 m (2,300–5,600 ft) and up to 2,000 m (6,600 ft) in Peru Diet:	LC No significant decline
Speckled tanager	Ixothraupis guttata (Cabanis, 1851)	Resident breeder in Costa Rica, Panama, Trinidad, Venezuela, Colombia, Guyana, Suriname and northern Brazil; sight records from French Guiana	Size: 13.2 cm (5.2 in); 18 g (0.63 oz) Habitat: Humid montane and secondary forest with generally not very tall trees and a dense understory; builds a small cup nest in a tree Diet: Mainly fruit and some insects; social, often seen with bay-headed tanagers and honeycreepers	LC
Yellow-bellied tanager	Ixothraupis xanthogastra (Sclater, PL, 1851) Two subspecies: I. x. xanthogastra (Sclater, 1851); I. x. phelpsi (Zimmer, 1943)	Northern and western South America: Venezuela, Colombia, Ecuador, Peru, Brazil, Bolivia and Guyana; not west of the Andes	Size: 11–12.2 cm (4.3–4.8 in); 14.1–17.9 g (0.50–0.63 oz) Habitat: Lowland tropical forests, woodland edges and secondary growth; I. x. phelpsi in montane forests on tepuís Diet:	LC No significant decline
