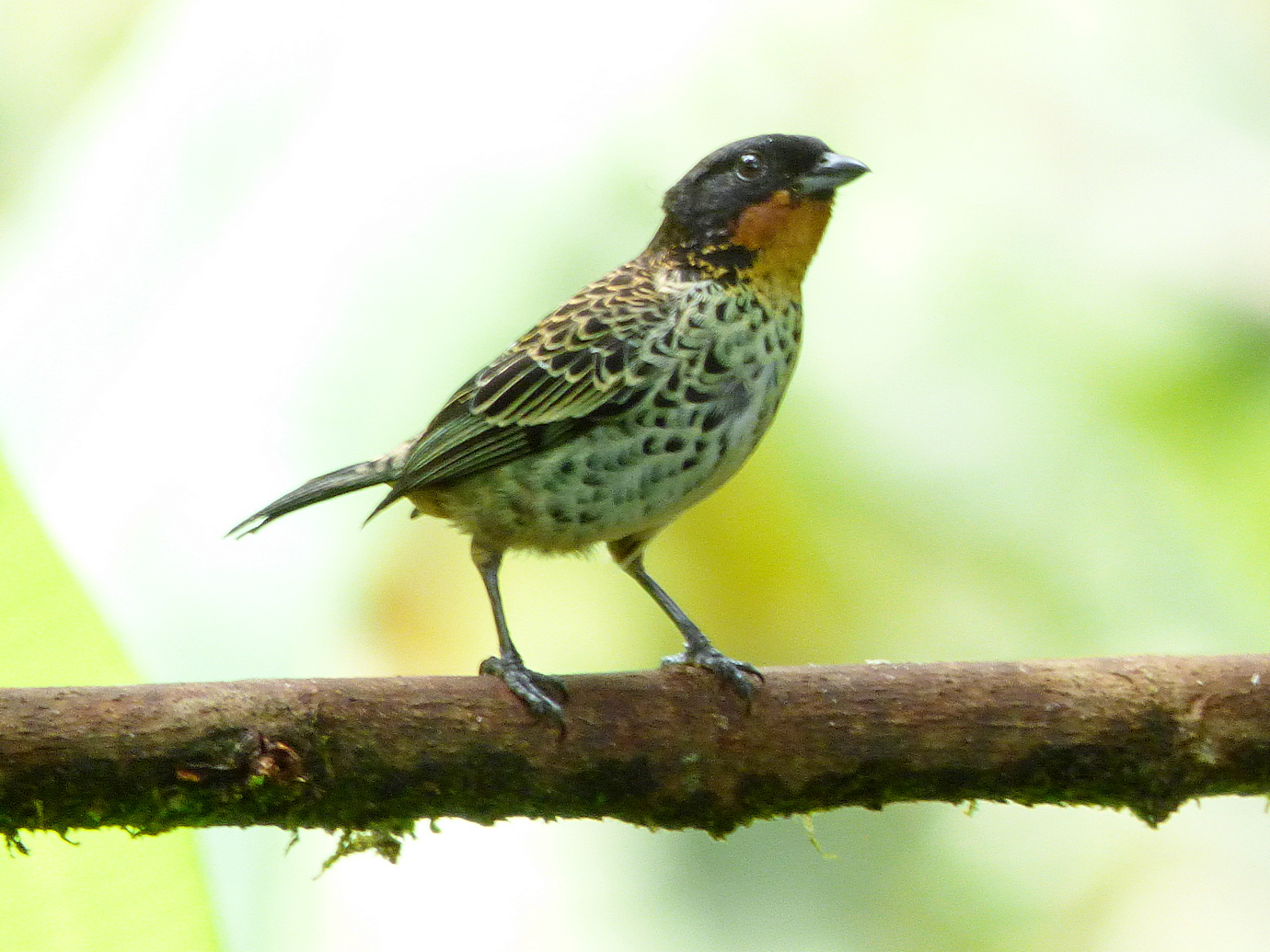

Conservation status
- Least Concern (IUCN 3.1)

Scientific classification
- Kingdom: Animalia
- Phylum: Chordata
- Class: Aves
- Order: Passeriformes
- Family: Thraupidae
- Genus: Ixothraupis
- Species: I. rufigula

Binomial name
- Ixothraupis rufigula (Bonaparte, 1851)

= Rufous-throated tanager =

Species of bird

The rufous-throated tanager (Ixothraupis rufigula) is a species of bird in the family Thraupidae. It is found in Colombia and Ecuador.

Its natural habitats are subtropical or tropical moist montane forests and heavily degraded former forest.
