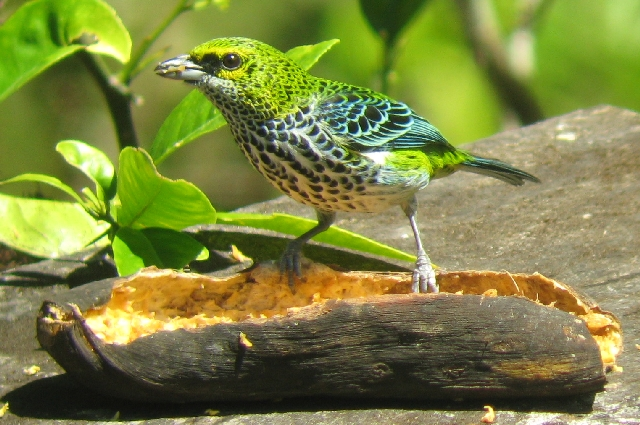

Conservation status
- Least Concern (IUCN 3.1)

Scientific classification
- Kingdom: Animalia
- Phylum: Chordata
- Class: Aves
- Order: Passeriformes
- Family: Thraupidae
- Genus: Ixothraupis
- Species: I. guttata

Binomial name
- Ixothraupis guttata (Cabanis, 1851)

= Speckled tanager =

Species of bird

The speckled tanager (Ixothraupis guttata) is a medium-sized passerine bird. It is a resident breeder in Costa Rica, Panama, Trinidad, Venezuela, Colombia, Guyana, Suriname and the north of Brazil. There are also sight records from French Guiana.

It is probably a close relative of the spotted tanager (I. punctata) which replaces it to the south. These two species are generally presumably to be fully allopatric, but may actually be parapatric: in 1998 a speckled tanager was found in the Serranía de los Churumbelos (Colombia), just about 160 km (99 mi) north of where spotted tanagers are known to occur.

Adult speckled tanagers are 13.2 cm (5.2 in) long and weigh 18 g (0.63 oz). The upperparts are green with black spotting, and the face is yellow with a black line from the eye to the gape. The wings and tail are black edged with green, and the underparts are white spotted with black. The sexes are similar. The speckled tanager's flight call is a weak metallic chirping tsip.

The Trinidadian subspecies I. g. trinitatis has brighter and more extensive yellow on the head, and the black spotting is more conspicuous.

Ixothraupis guttata is more of a subtropical species than its relative and occurs in humid montane and secondary forest, with generally not very tall trees and a dense understory. Speckled tanagers are social birds which eat mainly fruit and some insects. They are often seen with bay-headed tanagers and honeycreepers.

The small cup nest is built in a tree and the normal clutch is two brown-blotched white eggs. The female incubates the eggs for 13 days to hatching, with another 15 days before the chicks fledge.
