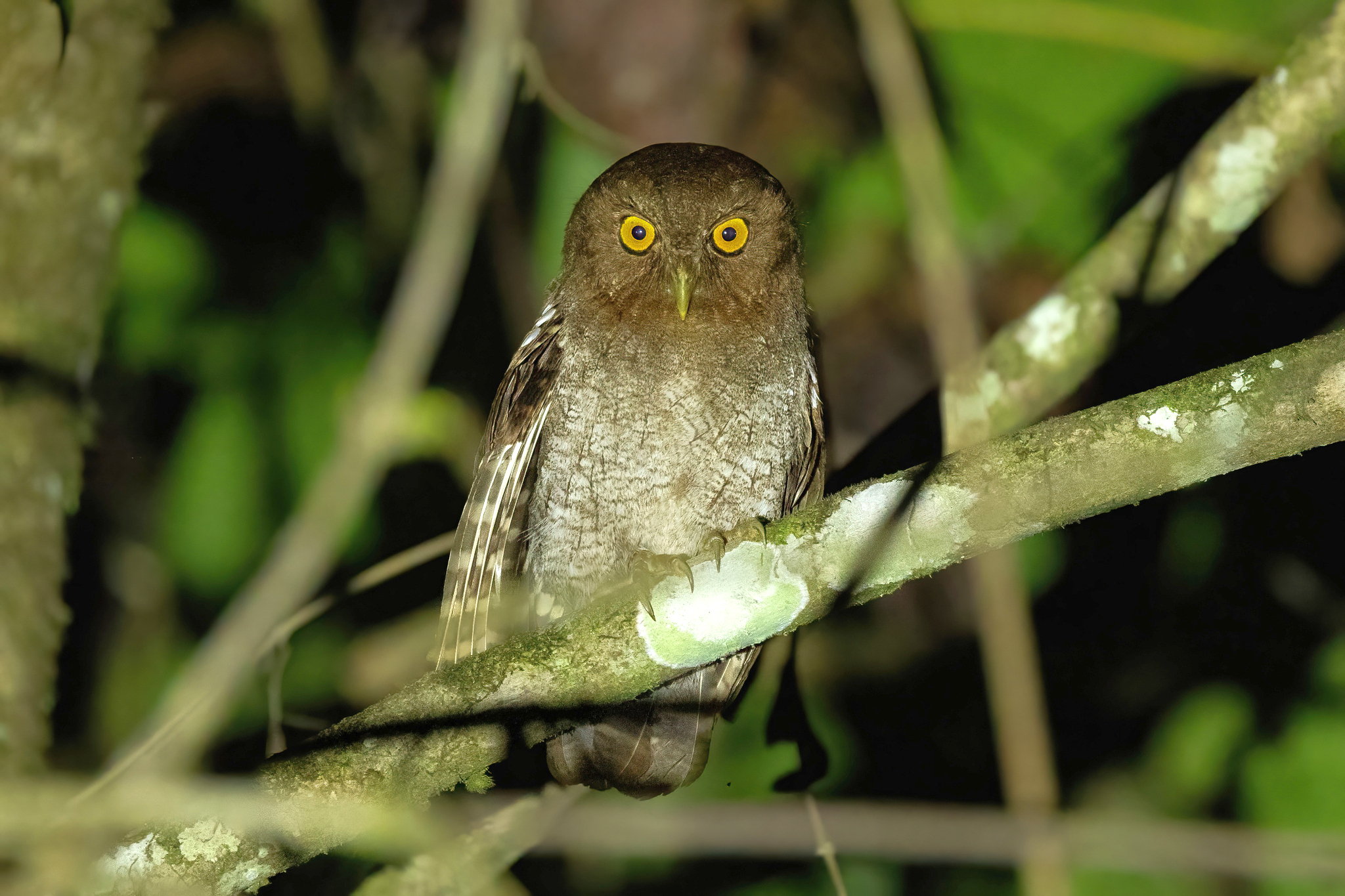

Conservation status
- CITES Appendix II (CITES)

Scientific classification
- Domain: Eukaryota
- Kingdom: Animalia
- Phylum: Chordata
- Class: Aves
- Order: Strigiformes
- Family: Strigidae
- Genus: Megascops
- Species: M. roraimae

Binomial name
- Megascops roraimae (Salvin, 1897)

Synonyms
- Otus roraimae Megascops guatemalae roraimae

= Foothill screech owl =

Species of owl

The foothill screech owl (Megascops roraimae) is a species of owl in the family Strigidae. It is found in Bolivia, Brazil, Colombia, Ecuador, Guyana, Suriname, and Venezuela.

== Taxonomy and systematics ==
The foothill screech owl's taxonomy has undergone numerous changes. It has variously been treated as embedded in or a subspecies of the original Otus guatemalae and then as a subspecies of O. vermiculatus when that was split from O. guatemalae. In the early 2000s all of the New World members of Otus were assigned to Megascops. As of 2019, the International Ornithological Committee (IOC), the North and South American Classification Committees of the American Ornithological Society (AOS), and the Clements taxonomy treat it as a separate species, Megascops roraimae. However, BirdLife International's Handbook of the Birds of the World treats it as being embedded within M. vermiculatus vermiculatus, the nominate subspecies of vermiculated screech owl.

The IOC recognizes three subspecies, the nominate Megascops roraimae roraimae, M. r. pallidus, and M. r. napensis. The Clements taxonomy recognizes two more, M. r. helleri and M. r. bolivianus, that the IOC includes within napensis.

== Description ==
The foothill screech owl is 20 to 23 cm (7.9 to 9.1 in) long and weighs 91 to 128 g (3.2 to 4.5 oz). The subspecies are reddish brown to brown with paler bellies, and most have both a pale and a dark morph. The intensity of the reddish cast varies among the subspecies as do the amount and pattern of streaks and spots on the upperparts and vermiculation on the underparts.

== Distribution and habitat ==
The subspecies of the foothill screech owl are found thus:

- M. r. roraimae, Guianan Shield tepuis of southern Venezuela, southern Guyana, Suriname, and adjacent northern Brazil
- M. r. pallidus, coastal mountains of northern Venezuela
- M. r. napensis, Andean foothills of Venezuela, eastern Colombia, and eastern Ecuador
- M. r. helleri, eastern Peru
- M. r. bolivianus, northern Bolivia

The foothill screech owl inhabits dense humid to wet rainforest, though exact details have not been documented. In elevation it mostly ranges between 250 and 1,500 m (820 and 4,920 ft) and rarely up to 1,800 m (5,900 ft).

== Behavior ==
=== Feeding ===
The foothill screech owl's hunting practices have not been documented. Its diet is mostly insects and other arthropods and perhaps includes small vertebrates.

=== Breeding ===
The foothill screech owl's breeding phenology has not been documented. It is assumed to nest in tree cavities, either natural or made by another bird, like others of its genus.

=== Vocalization ===
The foothill screech owl's song is a "wavering trill" similar to that of the Middle American screech owl (M. guatemalae). It "starts quietly, gradually increasing in volume and pitch, then dropping slightly in pitch but with steady volume [and] decreases in volume near [the] end."

== Status ==
The IUCN has not assessed the status of the foothill screech owl as a separate species, but includes it with the Middle American screech owl (M. guatemalae). It appears to favor intact forest, so "forest destruction [is] undoubtedly a real threat".
