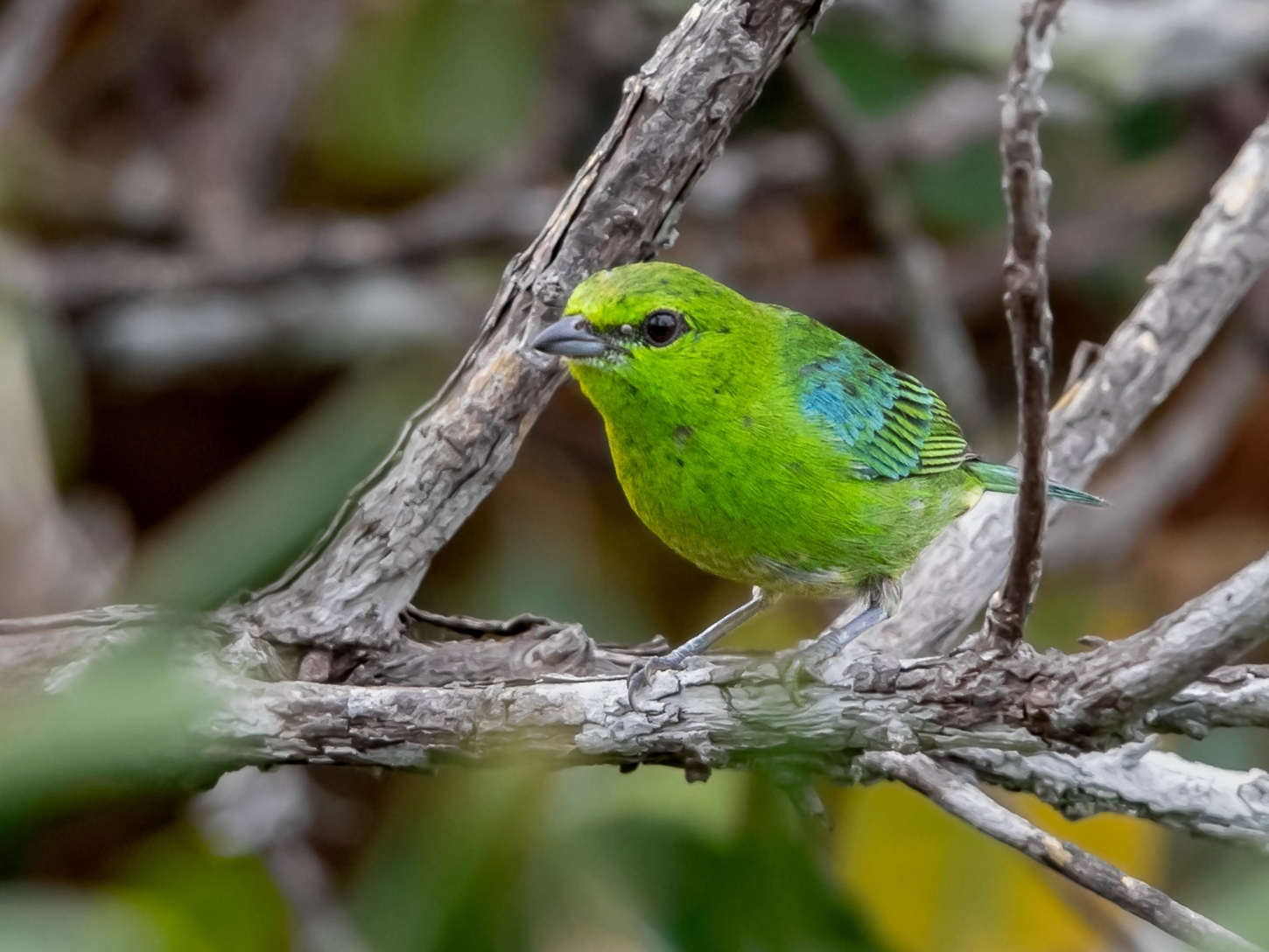
- male

Conservation status
- Least Concern (IUCN 3.1)

Scientific classification
- Kingdom: Animalia
- Phylum: Chordata
- Class: Aves
- Order: Passeriformes
- Family: Thraupidae
- Genus: Ixothraupis
- Species: I. varia

Binomial name
- Ixothraupis varia (Statius Müller, 1776)

Synonyms
- Tangara varia

= Dotted tanager =

Species of bird

The dotted tanager (Ixothraupis varia) is a species of bird in the family Thraupidae.

It is found in Brazil, French Guiana, Suriname, and Venezuela. Its natural habitats are subtropical or tropical moist lowland forests and heavily degraded former forest.
