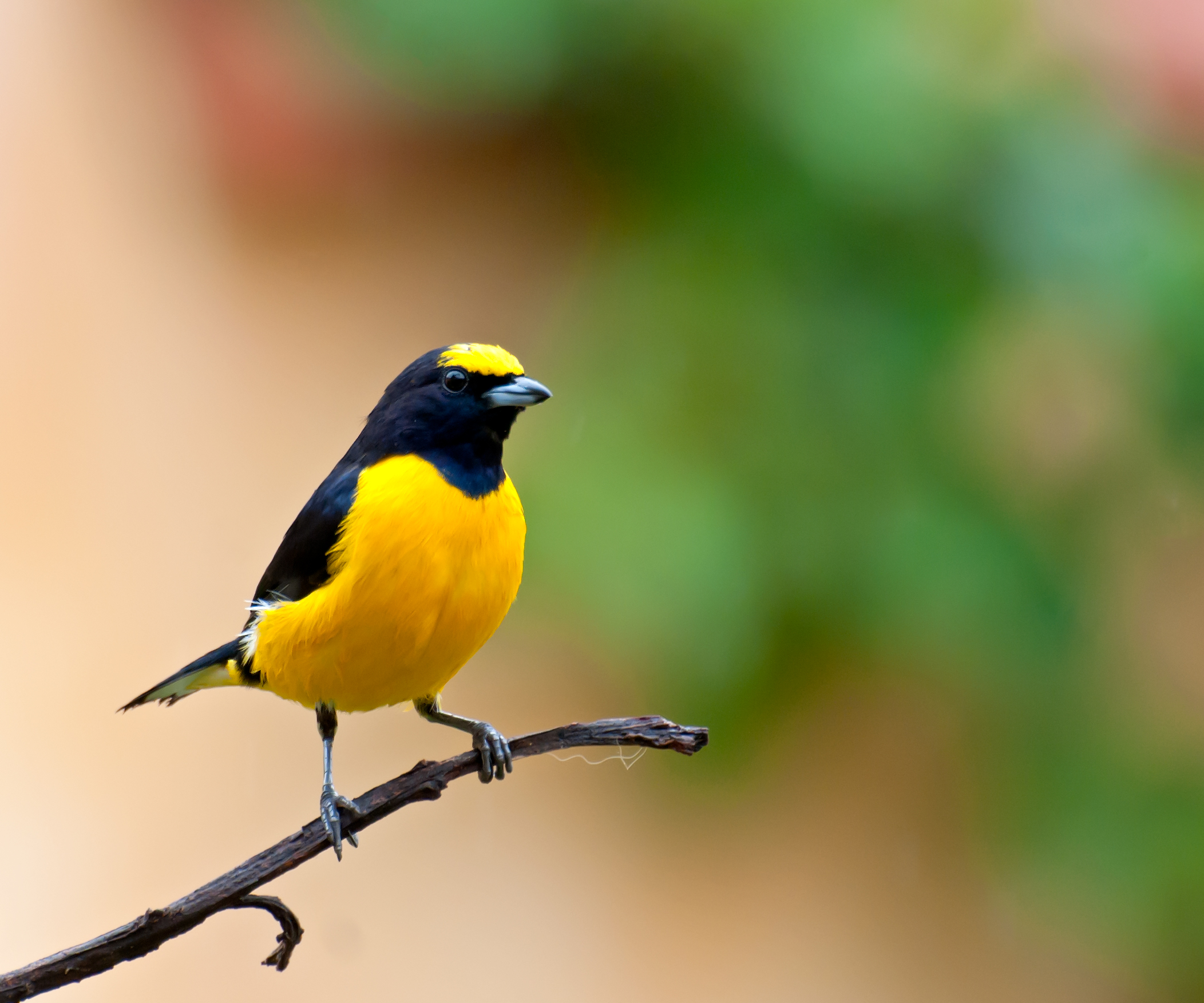
- Male in Brazil
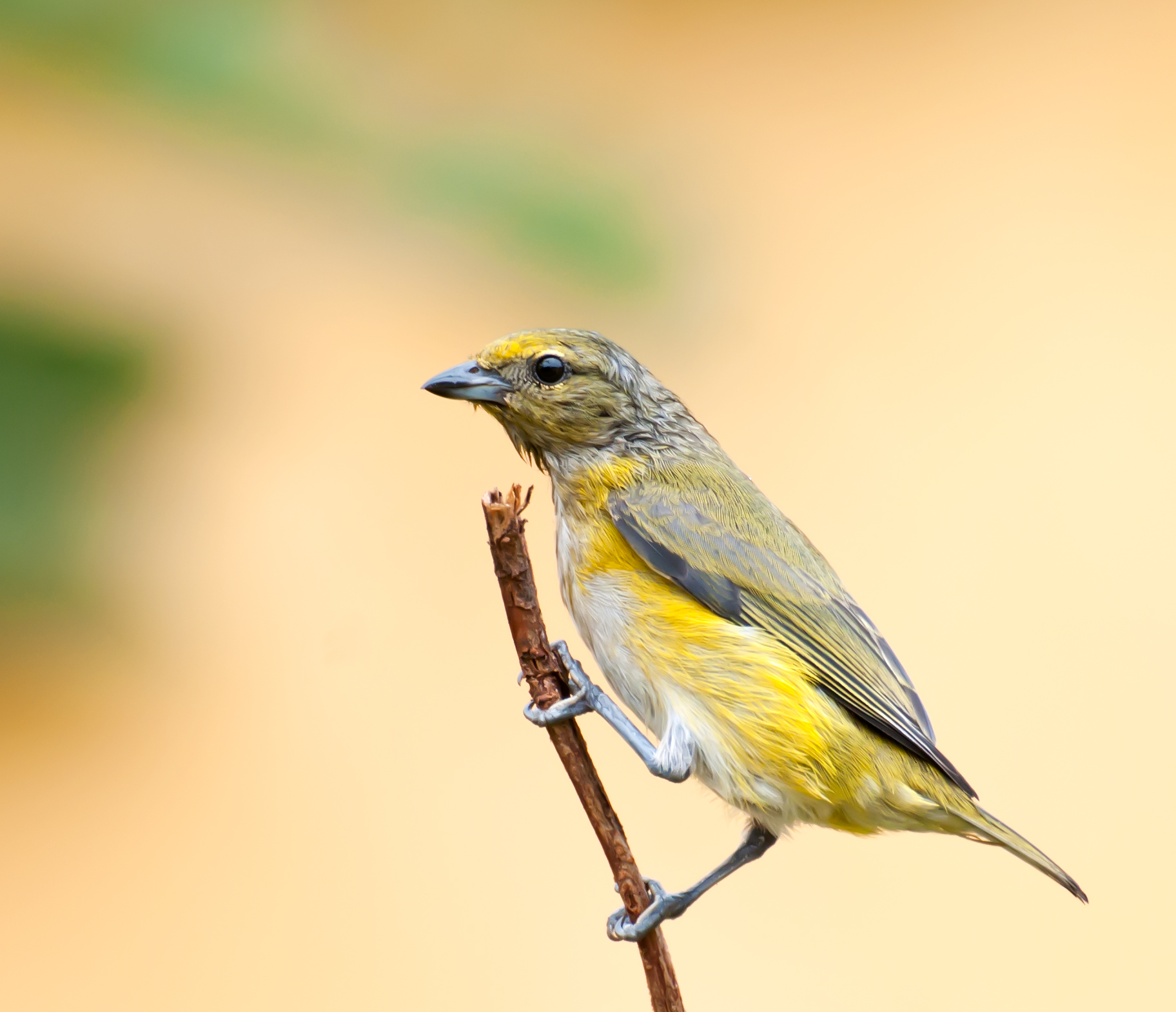
- Female in Brazil

Conservation status
- Least Concern (IUCN 3.1)

Scientific classification
- Kingdom: Animalia
- Phylum: Chordata
- Class: Aves
- Order: Passeriformes
- Family: Fringillidae
- Subfamily: Euphoniinae
- Genus: Euphonia
- Species: E. chlorotica

Binomial name
- Euphonia chlorotica (Linnaeus, 1766)

Synonyms
- Tanagra chlorotica Linnaeus, 1766

= Purple-throated euphonia =

Species of bird

The purple-throated euphonia (Euphonia chlorotica) is a species of bird in the family Fringillidae, the finches and euphonias. It is found in every mainland South American country except Chile, though in French Guiana only as a vagrant.

== Taxonomy and systematics ==
In 1760, the French zoologist Mathurin Jacques Brisson included a description of the purple-throated euphonia in his Ornithologie based on a specimen collected in Cayenne, French Guiana. He used the French name Le tangara noir et jaune de Cayenne and the Latin Tangara Cayanensis Nigrolutea. Although Brisson coined Latin names, these do not conform to the binomial system and are not recognized by the International Commission on Zoological Nomenclature. In 1766, when naturalist Carl Linnaeus updated his Systema Naturae for the twelfth edition, he added 240 species that had been previously described by Brisson. One of these was the purple-throated euphonia. Linnaeus included a brief description, coined the binomial name Tanagra chlorotica and cited Brisson's work. The specific epithet chlorotica is from the Ancient Greek khlōrotēs "greenness".

The purple-throated euphonia is now one of 25 Neotropical species placed in the genus Euphonia that was introduced by the French zoologist Anselme Gaëtan Desmarest in 1806. The genus Euphonia was long placed in the family Thraupidae, the "true" tanagers. Multiple studies in the late twentieth and early twenty-first centuries resulted in its being reassigned to its present place in the family Fringillidae.

The purple-throated euphonia has these five subspecies:

- E. c. cynophora (Oberholser, 1918)
- E. c. chlorotica (Linnaeus, 1766)
- E. c. amazonica Parkes, 1969
- E. c. taczanowskii Sclater, PL, 1886
- E. c. serrirostris d'Orbigny & Lafresnaye, 1837

What is now the Trinidad euphonia (E. trinitatis) was for a time included as a sixth subspecies of the purple-throated. These two and two other euphonias form a monophyletic clade.

== Description ==
The purple-throated euphonia is 9 to 10 cm (3.5 to 3.9 in) long and weighs about 8 to 14 g (0.28 to 0.49 oz). The species is sexually dimorphic. Adult males of the nominate subspecies E. c. chlorotica have a bright yellow forehead and forecrown; the color extends to the rear of the eye. The rest of their head and their upperparts are glossy blue-black that in good light has a purplish tinge. The upper side of their tail is blackish and the underside duller with white on the inner webs of the outer two or three pairs of feathers. Their flight feathers are black with a dark blue tinge and dark blue edges; the basal half of them have white inner webs. Their chin and throat are glossy blue-black and the rest of their underparts are bright yellow. Adult females have a mostly olive head with a faint grayish tinge, a yellowish forehead, and dusky lores. Their upperparts, wings, and tail are olive with the grayish tinge. Their throat and underparts are mostly olive-yellow with a whitish central breast and a pale ash-gray central belly.

The other subspecies of the purple-throated euphonia differ from the nominate and each other thus:

- E. c. cynophora: male has slightly more yellow on forecrown than nominate, with glossier violet bib and upperparts and slightly deeper yellow underparts; female has uniform olive-yellow underparts
- E. c. taczanowskii: male has paler yellow forehead and forecrown than nominate, with slightly more purple upperparts and paler yellow underparts
- E. c. amazonica: male like taczanowskii; female has a more greenish yellow forehead than nominate with greenish yellow lores and flanks
- E. c. serrirostris: male like nominate but yellow of forecrown extends less far

Both sexes of all subspecies have a dark brown iris, a blue-gray bill with a blackish tip, and dark gray legs and feet.

== Distribution and habitat ==
The purple-throated euphonia has a disjunct distribution whose ranges cover most of South America. It is absent from the Amazon Basin except along the Amazon River itself, from the Andes west, and Chile and southern Argentina. The subspecies are found thus:

- E. c. cynophora: from east-central Colombia east into west-central Venezuela's Táchira and western Apure states and across its Amazonas and Bolívar states; also into extreme northern Brazil's Roraima state
- E. c. chlorotica: Guyana, Suriname, and as a vagrant to French Guiana; separately in Brazil to the Atlantic in an area bounded on the west and south roughly by eastern and southern Amapá, the Tapajós River south of the Amazon, northern Mato Grosso, northern Goiás, northern Minas Gerais, southern Bahia, and Espírito Santo
- E. c. amazonica: along the Amazon from southeastern Colombia and extreme northeastern Peru through Brazil to the Tapajós
- E. c. taczanowskii: along river systems in northern and eastern Peru and extreme southern Ecuador's Zamora-Chinchipe Province; on the Pampas del Heath of southeastern Peru's Department of Madre de Dios and northern Bolivia
- E. c. serrirostris: Brazil south of E. c. chlorotica west into southeastern Bolivia and south through Paraguay, far northern Uruguay, and northern and central Argentina to northern Buenos Aires Province

The purple-throated euphonia inhabits several quite different landscapes, though in all it is primarily either outside of forest or on its edges, and infrequently in the canopy of the forest interior. Along the upper tributaries of the Amazon in Peru and along the main stem it occurs in river-edge forest, on river islands, and in nearby "inland" clearings with some tall trees. It occurs around the edges of the Pampas del Heath savanna. Elsewhere it occurs in dry to humid woodlands, gallery forest, secondary forest, mangroves, caatinga and chaco scrublands, and cerrado. In Venezuela it reaches an elevation of 300 m (1,000 ft) north of the Orinoco River and 900 m (3,000 ft) south of it. It reaches 500 m (1,600 ft) in Colombia, 1,100 m (3,600 ft) in Ecuador, 1,400 m (4,600 ft) in Peru, mostly to 1,200 m (3,900 ft) but locally higher in Brazil, and 2,000 m (6,600 ft) in Bolivia.

== Behavior ==
=== Movement ===
The purple-throated euphonia is primarily a resident species. However, some seasonal movements in northern Peru and eastern Brazil have been reported. The species is also thought to wander seasonally throughout its range.

=== Feeding ===
The purple-throated euphonia feeds primarily on the fruits of mistletoe (Loranthaceae) and other small fruits including those of figs (Ficus), and also includes small numbers of insects in its diet. It forages mostly in pairs or family groups, occasionally in larger groups that may include other euphonias, and regularly joins mixed-species feeding flocks. It usually forages high in trees.

=== Breeding ===
The purple-throated euphonia's breeding season or seasons have not been defined. One nest was a globe with a side entrance made from plant fibers and dry leaves lined with fine fibers. It was placed in a multiple-branch fork high in a tree. Nothing else is known about the species' breeding biology in the wild. In captivity, eggs were grayish white with reddish brown markings. A female incubated them for about 15 days; the time to fledging was not recorded. Both parents provisioned nestlings.

=== Vocalization ===
The purple-throated euphonia's song is "a jumbled series of squeaks, harsh notes and whistles" that is infrequently heard. A typical call is "a high, clear, whistled teee, deee" that is often lengthened to three or four notes as "teee, deee, deee"; occasionally it makes only a single "teee". The notes are on a single pitch.

== Status ==
The IUCN has assessed the purple-throated euphonia as being of Least Concern. It has an extremely large range; its population size is not known but is believed to be stable. No immediate threats have been identified. It is "fairly common" in Venezuela and Colombia, very limited in Ecuador, common in northern Peru and locally common in the south, and "common to frequent" in Brazil. It "[o]ccurs in many parks and reserves, and also in many unprotected areas that appear to be at little risk".
