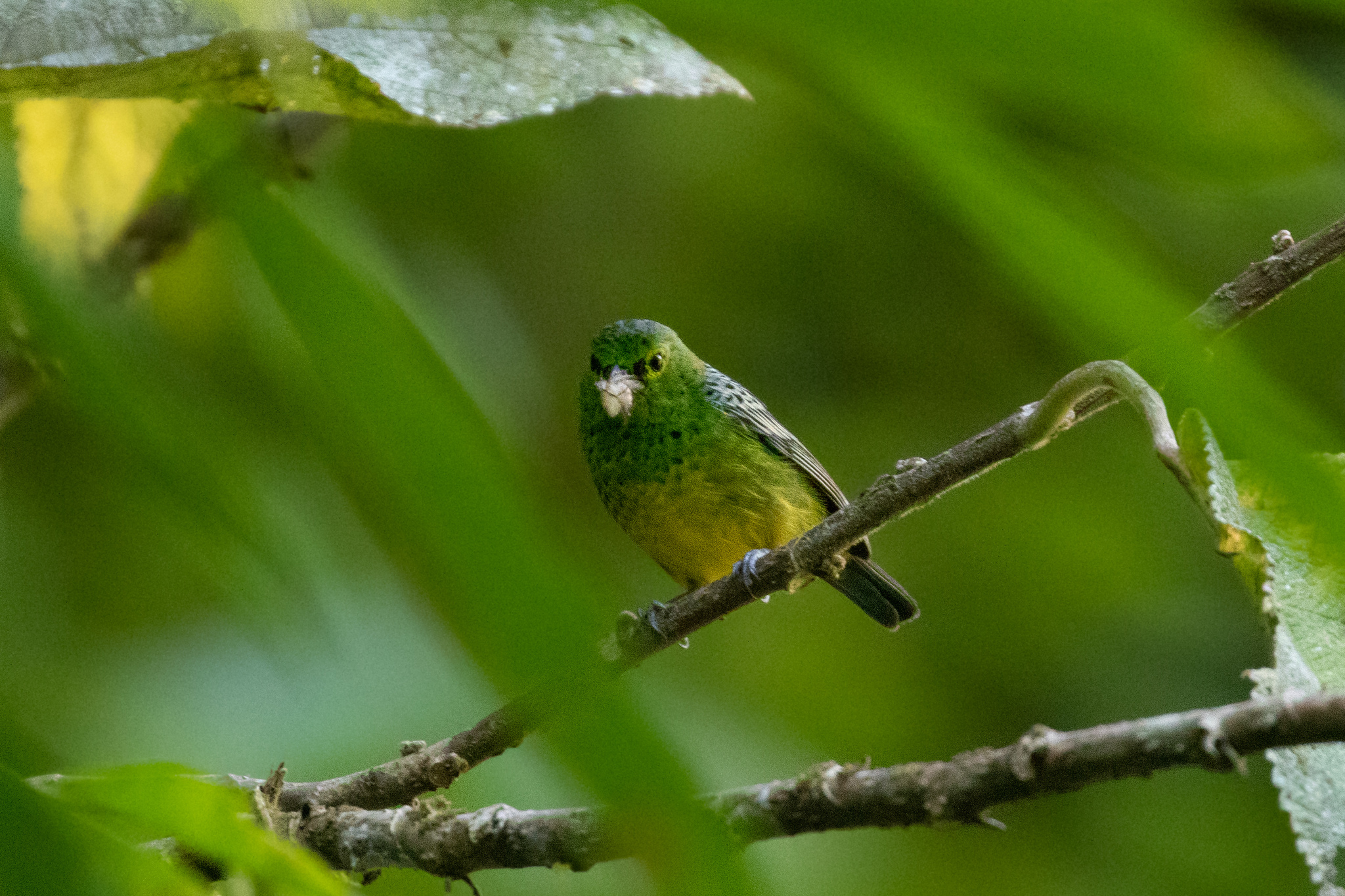

Conservation status
- Least Concern (IUCN 3.1)

Scientific classification
- Kingdom: Animalia
- Phylum: Chordata
- Class: Aves
- Order: Passeriformes
- Family: Thraupidae
- Genus: Ixothraupis
- Species: I. xanthogastra

Binomial name
- Ixothraupis xanthogastra (Sclater, PL, 1851)

= Yellow-bellied tanager =

Species of bird

The yellow-bellied tanager (Ixothraupis xanthogastra) is a species of bird in the family Thraupidae. It is across northern and western South America, being found from Venezuela east into Colombia, Ecuador, and Peru, south into Brazil and Bolivia, and east into Guyana. It mostly inhabits lowland tropical forests, woodland edges, and secondary growth. It is, on average, it is 11–12.2 cm (4.3–4.8 in) long and weighs 14.1–17.9 g (0.5–0.6 oz). It is largely green with a pattern of black spots, with a clean yellow belly and unspotted flanks. It is classified as being of least concern by the IUCN.

== Taxonomy ==
The yellow-bellied tanager was formally described by the English ornithologist Philip Sclater in 1851 as Calliste xanthogastra based on specimens from the Rio Negro of Peru. The specific epithet is derived from the Greek words meaning "yellow-bellied". The species was formerly placed in the genus Tangara.

The yellow-bellied tanager has two recognized subspecies:

- I. x. xanthogastra (Sclater, 1851): The nominate subspecies, it is found across much of Amazonia, from Venezuela west to Colombia, east to eastern Ecuador and Peru, and south to western Brazil and northern Bolivia.
- I. x. phelpsi (Zimmer, 1943): It is found on tepuís in southern Venezuela, Brazil, and western Guyana.

== Description ==
The yellow-bellied tanager is, on average, it is 11–12.2 cm (4.3–4.8 in) long and weighs 14.1–17.9 g (0.5–0.6 oz). It is largely emerald to grass green, with a clean yellow belly that gives it its name. The wings and bluish-green. The entire body, excepting the belly and flanks, is covered with a black spot pattern. The lores are also blackish.

== Distribution and habitat ==
The yellow-bellied tanager is widespread across northern and western South America. However, it does not occur west of the Andes. It is a denizen of lowland tropical forests, woodland edges, and secondary growth. The subspecies phelpsi inhabits montane forests on tepuís.

== Conservation ==
The yellow-bellied tanager is classified as being of least concern by the IUCN due to its large range and lack of a significant enough population decline to warrant a more threatened listing.
