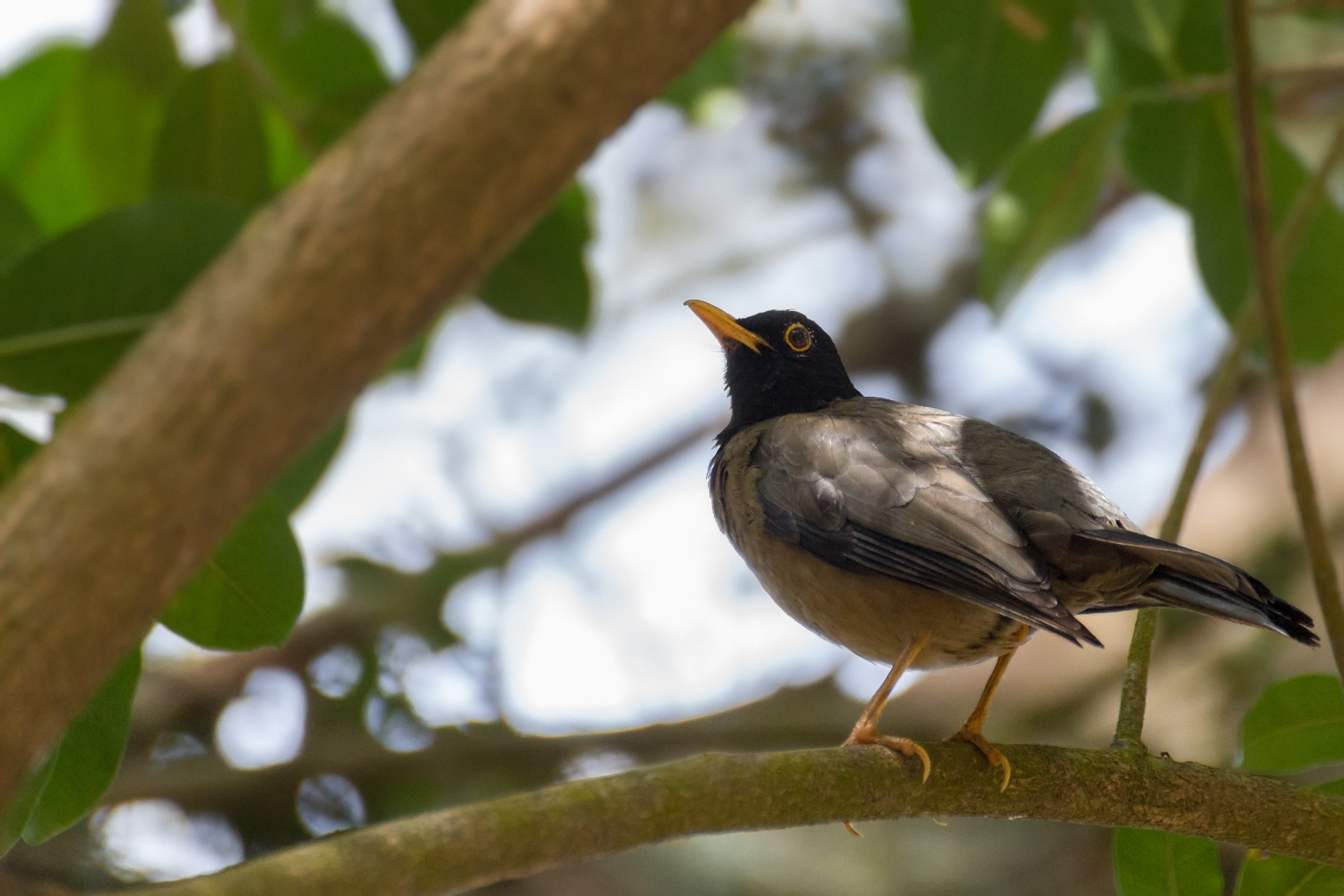

Conservation status
- Least Concern (IUCN 3.1)

Scientific classification
- Kingdom: Animalia
- Phylum: Chordata
- Class: Aves
- Order: Passeriformes
- Family: Turdidae
- Genus: Turdus
- Species: T. olivater

Binomial name
- Turdus olivater (Lafresnaye, 1848)

= Black-hooded thrush =

Species of bird

The black-hooded thrush (Turdus olivater) is a species of bird in the family Turdidae. It is found in Brazil, Colombia, Guyana, Suriname, and Venezuela.

== Taxonomy and systematics ==
The black-hooded thrush was originally described as Merula olivata.

The black-hooded thrush has these eight subspecies:

- T. o. sanctaemartae (Todd, 1913)
- T. o. caucae (Chapman, 1914)
- T. o. olivater (Lafresnaye, 1848)
- T. o. kemptoni Phelps, WH & Phelps, WH Jr, 1955
- T. o. paraquensis Phelps, WH & Phelps, WH Jr, 1946
- T. o. duidae Chapman, 1929
- T. o. roraimae Salvin & Godman, 1884
- T. o. ptaritepui Phelps, WH & Phelps, WH Jr, 1946

At least one twentieth century publication suggested that T. o. caucae could deserve full species status; it had been originally described as one.

== Description ==
The black-hooded thrush is 23 to 24 cm (9.1 to 9.4 in) long and weighs 70 to 91 g (2.5 to 3.2 oz). The species is sexually dimorphic. Adult males of the nominate subspecies T. o. olivater have an almost entirely black head and upper breast with a thin yellow eye-ring. Their upperparts, wings, and tail are dark olive-brown and their underparts sandy-orange. Adult females have a mostly brown head with buff flecking on the face and throat. Their upperparts, wings, and tail are the same olive-brown as the male's; their underparts have a paler belly than males' with darker specks on the vent. Both sexes have a dark iris and a yellow bill, legs, and feet. Juveniles resemble adult females but with two wing bars of orange spots and dark mottling on their throat and breast.

The other subspecies of the black-hooded thrush differ from the nominate and each other thus:

- T. o. sanctaemartae: pale brown breast with olive-brown feather edges on lower part
- T. o. caucae: male has dark (not black) head without sharp edge and off-white throat and upper breast with smudgy dark streaks
- T. o. kemptoni: buff and black streaks on throat and dark rufous-buff underparts
- T. o. paraquensis: buff and black streaks on throat and lighter rufous-buff underparts
- T. o. duidae: like kemtoni but with less contrast between upper- and underparts
- T. o. roraimae: black hood but with less defined edge and olive-brown throat with black streaks
- T. o. ptaritepui: very like roraimae but somewhat warmer brown all over

== Distribution and habitat ==
The black-hooded thrush has a highly disjunct distribution. The subspecies are found thus:

- T. o. sanctaemartae: northern Colombia's isolated Sierra Nevada de Santa Marta
- T. o. caucae: Colombia's Cauca River valley
- T. o. olivater: Serranía de Perijá on the Colombia-Venezuela border; Venezuelan Coastal Range from Carabobo to Miranda; Andes from Lara in Venezuela south into Colombia's Eastern Andes; and Venezuela's northern Falcón state
- T. o. kemptoni: Cerro de la Neblina in Venezuela's Amazonas state
- T. o. paraquensis: Cerro Paraque and Cerro Sipapo in Amazonas state
- T. o. duidae: Cerro Duida and other tepuis of Venezuela in northern Amazonas and northwestern Bolívar states
- T. o. roraimae: Sierra de Lema in southern Bolívar; tepuis in western Guyana and extreme northern Brazil; Suriname
- T. o. ptaritepui: Ptari-tepui and tepuis of Gran Sabana in southeastern Bolívar

The black-hooded thrush inhabits humid montane forest, secondary forest, and shade coffee plantations. In Colombia it also occurs in scrublands. In Venezuela it ranges in elevation between 800 and 1,950 m (2,600 and 6,400 ft) north of the Orinoco River and between 950 and 2,600 m (3,100 and 8,500 ft) south of it. It ranges between 600 and 2,400 m (2,000 and 7,900 ft) in Colombia and between 900 and 2,600 m (3,000 and 8,500 ft) in Brazil.

== Behavior ==
=== Movement ===
The black-hooded thrush is mostly a sedentary year-round resident though some short-distance migration in Venezuela is suspected.

=== Feeding ===
The black-hooded thrush's diet has not been studied but is known to include fruit. It forages on the ground, where it flips over leaf litter, and in fruiting trees where other species can be present. It sometimes attends army ant swarms.

=== Breeding ===
The black-hooded thrush breeds between January and July. It builds a cup nest of mosses and mud, typically near the ground. The clutch is two to three eggs that are pale blue with purple and light brown spots. Nothing else is known about the species' breeding biology.

=== Vocalization ===
The black-hooded thrush's song is "a full-bodied Turdus-like caroling, TEEur..turee..todee..churdur..turwere..turee.. and so on, the phrases warbled". The phrases are similar and typically have two or three syllables. High thin ee'ee notes often are interspersed.

== Status ==
The IUCN has assessed the black-hooded thrush as being of Least Concern. It has a large range; its population size is not known and is believed to be decreasing. No immediate threats have been identified. In Venezuela it is generally uncommon but uncommon to locally common south of the Orinoco. It is common in Colombia and known from only a few locations in Brazil. There is only one confirmed record in Suriname.
