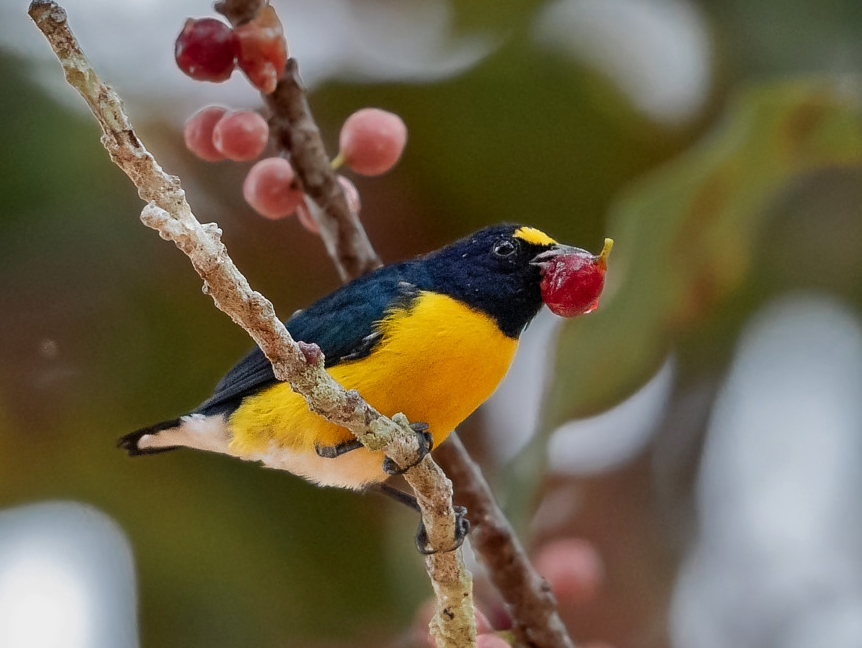

Conservation status
- Least Concern (IUCN 3.1)

Scientific classification
- Kingdom: Animalia
- Phylum: Chordata
- Class: Aves
- Order: Passeriformes
- Family: Fringillidae
- Subfamily: Euphoniinae
- Genus: Euphonia
- Species: E. minuta

Binomial name
- Euphonia minuta Cabanis, 1849

= White-vented euphonia =

Species of bird

The white-vented euphonia (Euphonia minuta) is a species of bird in the family Fringillidae, the finches and euphonias. It is found from Mexico through much of Central America and in every mainland South American country except Argentina, Chile, Paraguay, and Uruguay.

== Taxonomy and systematics ==
The white-vented euphonia was originally described in 1849 with its current binomial Euphonia minuta. The species had earlier been known as Euphonia olivacea but by the principle of priority that binomial was suppressed. The genus Euphonia had long placed in the family Thraupidae, the "true" tanagers. Multiple studies in the late twentieth and early twenty-first centuries resulted in its being reassigned to its present place in the family Fringillidae.

The white-vented euphonia has two subspecies, the nominate E. m. minuta (Cabanis, 1849) and E. m. humilis (Cabanis, 1861).

== Description ==
The white-vented euphonia is about 9 cm (3.5 in) long and weighs about 8 to 11.5 g (0.28 to 0.41 oz). It is a very small euphonia with a short thick bill. The species is sexually dimorphic. Adult males of the nominate subspecies have a small bright yellow forehead; the patch does not reach the eye. The rest of their head, their neck, and their upperparts are glossy blue-black with a purplish gloss on the head and nape. Their flight feathers are dusky with dark blue edges. Their tail is mostly glossy blue-black with white inner webs on the underside of the outer three pairs of feathers. Their breast and belly are bright yellow with sometimes some dusky mottling on the flanks. The middle of their belly and their undertail coverts are white. Adult females have an olive head, upperparts, wings, and tail. Their throat is dingy grayish white, their upper breast, sides and flanks are olive-yellow, and the center of their lower breast, belly, and undertail coverts are white. Males of subspecies E. m. humilis have a larger yellow forehead patch and a slightly darker and richer yellow upper breast than the nominate. Both sexes of both subspecies have a dark brown iris, a black bill with a blue-gray base to the mandible, and dark gray legs and feet.

== Distribution and habitat ==
The white-vented euphonia has a disjunct distribution. Subspecies E. m. humilis is the more northerly of the two and itself occurs in three separate ranges. One population is found from Chiapas in far southeastern Mexico, in scattered locations across Belize, Guatemala, and Honduras, and more nearly continuously on the Caribbean slope through Nicaragua and Costa Rica to central Panama. A second population is found on the Pacific slope from central Puntarenas and San José provinces in Costa Rica south to Panama's Veraguas Province. The third is found from extreme eastern Panama into western Colombia and south to northwestern Ecuador's Santo Domingo de los Tsáchilas Province. In Colombia it also extends east into the valley of the Magdalena River.

The nominate subspecies of the white-vented euphonia has a mostly contiguous range in northwestern and northern South America. It is found from much of southeastern Colombia south through eastern Ecuador and eastern Peru to central Bolivia. In the north its range continues in Colombia in a thin band northeast along the Eastern Andes slightly into northwestern Venezuela's Táchira, and from southeastern Colombia across much of southern and far eastern Venezuela. From Venezuela its range crosses the Guianas and Brazil north of the Amazon to the Atlantic in Amapá. From southeastern Colombia, Ecuador, Peru, and Bolivia its range continues east into Brazil. There it reaches the watershed of the Negro River north of the Amazon and south of the Amazon along the south bank of the river to the Atlantic. South of that band its range's eastern boundary is roughly from eastern Mato Grosso southwest to west central Mato Grosso do Sul and slightly into eastern Bolivia. There are also scattered records in Brazil to the east of its contiguous range.

The white-vented euphonia inhabits a variety of humid to wet lowland forest landscapes in the tropical and lower subtropical zones. In Central America these include the canopy and edges of rainforest. In the Amazon Basin the landscapes include várzea and terra firme forests and nearby clearings in drier forest. In elevation it reaches 1,000 m (3,300 ft) in northern Central America, 1,200 m (3,900 ft) in Costa Rica, 1,000 m (3,300 ft) in Colombia, 700 m (2,300 ft) in Ecuador, 1,500 m (4,900 ft) in Peru, 900 m (3,000 ft) in Venezuela, and 1,000 m (3,300 ft) in Brazil.

== Behavior ==
=== Movement ===
The white-vented euphonia is primarily a resident species. However, some elevational wandering has been reported in Costa Rica and Colombia.

=== Feeding ===
The white-vented euphonia feeds primarily on the fruits of mistletoe (Loranthaceae) and other small fruits, and also includes small numbers of insects in its diet. It mostly forages singly and in pairs though sometimes in small groups. It often associates with other euphonias and regularly joins mixed-species feeding flocks. In the forest it forages primarily in the canopy. It almost continuously wags its tail while foraging.

=== Breeding ===
The white-vented euphonia apparently breeds between February and July in Costa Rica, where it sometimes attempts two broods. Its season or seasons elsewhere are not known. Its nest is a small globe with a side entrance made from moss, ferns, and other plant material lined with fine plant fibers. It is typically placed in moss or epiphytes on a large branch between about 3 and 18 m (10 and 60 ft) above the ground. The clutch is three to five eggs that are white with heavy brown markings. The incubation period, time to fledging, and details of parental care are not known.

=== Vocalization ===
The white-vented euphonia's song is "surprisingly loud and forceful for so small a bird, a shrill series of sharp and staccato notes, tu, véévéét, ch-véét, cheewit, chewit, ...véét...ch-véét, tsik, veéé, vic-squik, squik-squik, veéé... and so on". Its calls include "a sharp veet" and "a sputtery wee-chu".

== Status ==
The IUCN has assessed the white-vented euphonia as being of Least Concern. It has an extremely large range; its population of at least 500,000 mature individuals is believed to be decreasing. No immediate threats have been identified. It is considered uncommon in northern Central America and Costa Rica, fairly common in Colombia, "generally scarce" in Ecuador, uncommon in Peru, fairly common in Venezuela, and "frequent to uncommon" in Brazil. Because of deforestation there, "[a]ll populations [west] of Andes are worthy of investigation. [It is] found in numerous protected areas in Amazonia, and faces no serious threats in this region."
