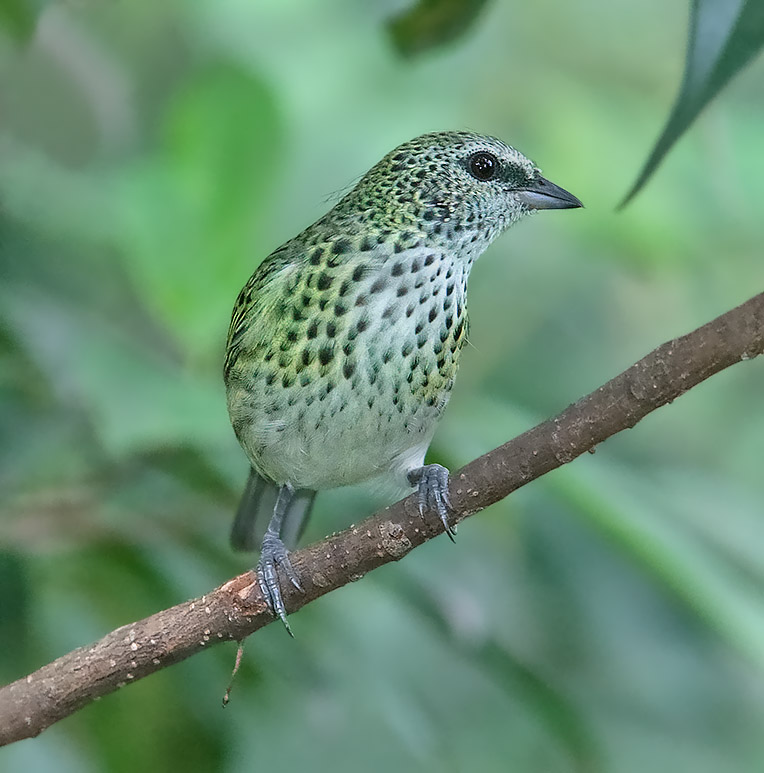

Conservation status
- Least Concern (IUCN 3.1)

Scientific classification
- Kingdom: Animalia
- Phylum: Chordata
- Class: Aves
- Order: Passeriformes
- Family: Thraupidae
- Genus: Ixothraupis
- Species: I. punctata

Binomial name
- Ixothraupis punctata (Linnaeus, 1766)

Synonyms
- Tanagra punctata Linnaeus, 1766

= Spotted tanager =

Species of bird

The spotted tanager (Ixothraupis punctata) is a species of bird in the tanager family Thraupidae. It is found in Bolivia, Brazil, Ecuador, French Guiana, Guyana, Peru, Suriname, and Venezuela. Its natural habitats are subtropical or tropical moist lowland forests and subtropical or tropical moist montane forests.

== Taxonomy ==
In 1760 the French zoologist Mathurin Jacques Brisson included a description of the spotted tanager in his Ornithologie based on a specimen collected in the West Indies. He used the French name Le tangara verd piqueté des Indes and the Latin name Tangara viridis indica punctulata. Although Brisson coined Latin names, these do not conform to the binomial system and are not recognised by the International Commission on Zoological Nomenclature. When in 1766 the Swedish naturalist Carl Linnaeus updated his Systema Naturae for the twelfth edition he added 240 species that had been previously described by Brisson. One of these was the spotted tanager. Linnaeus included a terse description, coined the binomial name Tanagra punctata and cited Brisson's work. The specific name punctata is Latin for "spotted". The spotted tanager is now placed in the genus Ixothraupis.

Five subspecies are recognised:

- I. p. punctata (Linnaeus, 1766) – south Venezuela, the Guianas and north Brazil
- I. p. zamorae (Chapman, 1925) – central Ecuador and north Peru
- I. p. perenensis (Chapman, 1925) – central Peru
- I. p. annectens (Zimmer, JT, 1943) – southeast Peru
- I. p. punctulata (Sclater, PL & Salvin, 1876) – west-central Bolivia

== Description ==
The spotted tanager has green upperparts, white underparts and face with a bluish-gray wash, black lores, and greenish-yellow flanks. Its most conspicuous feature is the dense, black, scale-like speckling all over its body.

== Distribution and habitat ==
The spotted tanager is widespread across South America, where its range is somewhat uniquely spit into two disjunct portions in the Andes and the Amazon Rainforest. The Amazonian portion of the range spans Brazil, the Guianas, and southern Venezuela, while the Andean portion runs from northern Ecuador south through Peru into Bolivia. In the Amazon, it is most abundant in lowlands below 1,100 m (3,600 ft), but can be seen as high as 1,600 m (5,200 ft). In the Andes, it is largely known from elevations of 700–1,700 m (2,300–5,600 ft), although Peruvian birds have been seen up to 2,000 m (6,600 ft). It is a denizen of lowland tropical forests, including terra firme forest and savanna forest, in the Amazon, and montane forests, including mossy forests, in the Andes. Besides primary forest, they can also be seen in woodland edges, secondary forests, and plantations.

== Conservation ==
The spotted tanager is classified as being of least concern by the IUCN due to its large range and lack of a significant enough population decline to warrant a more threatened listing.

== Gallery ==
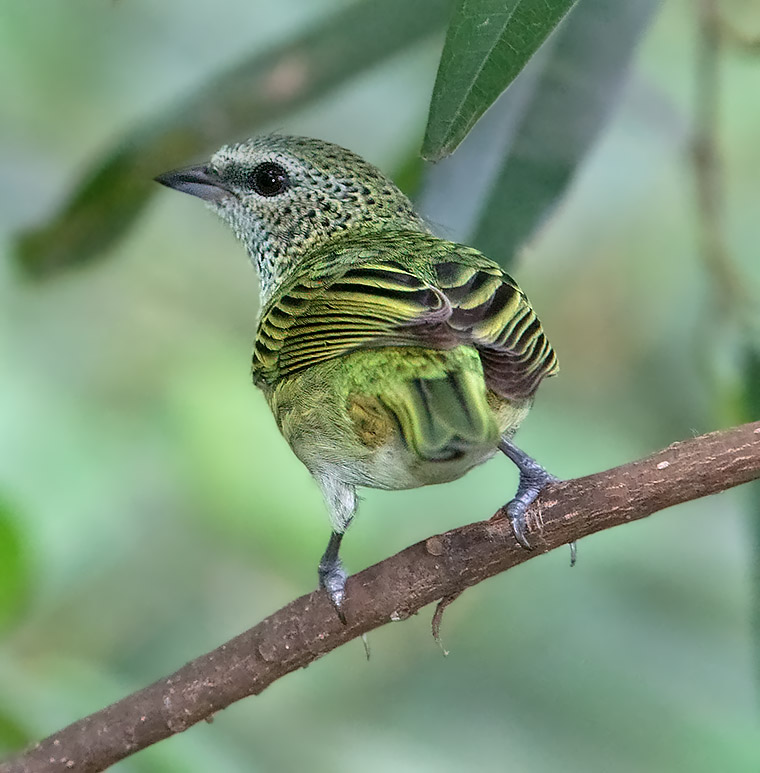
Spotted tanager

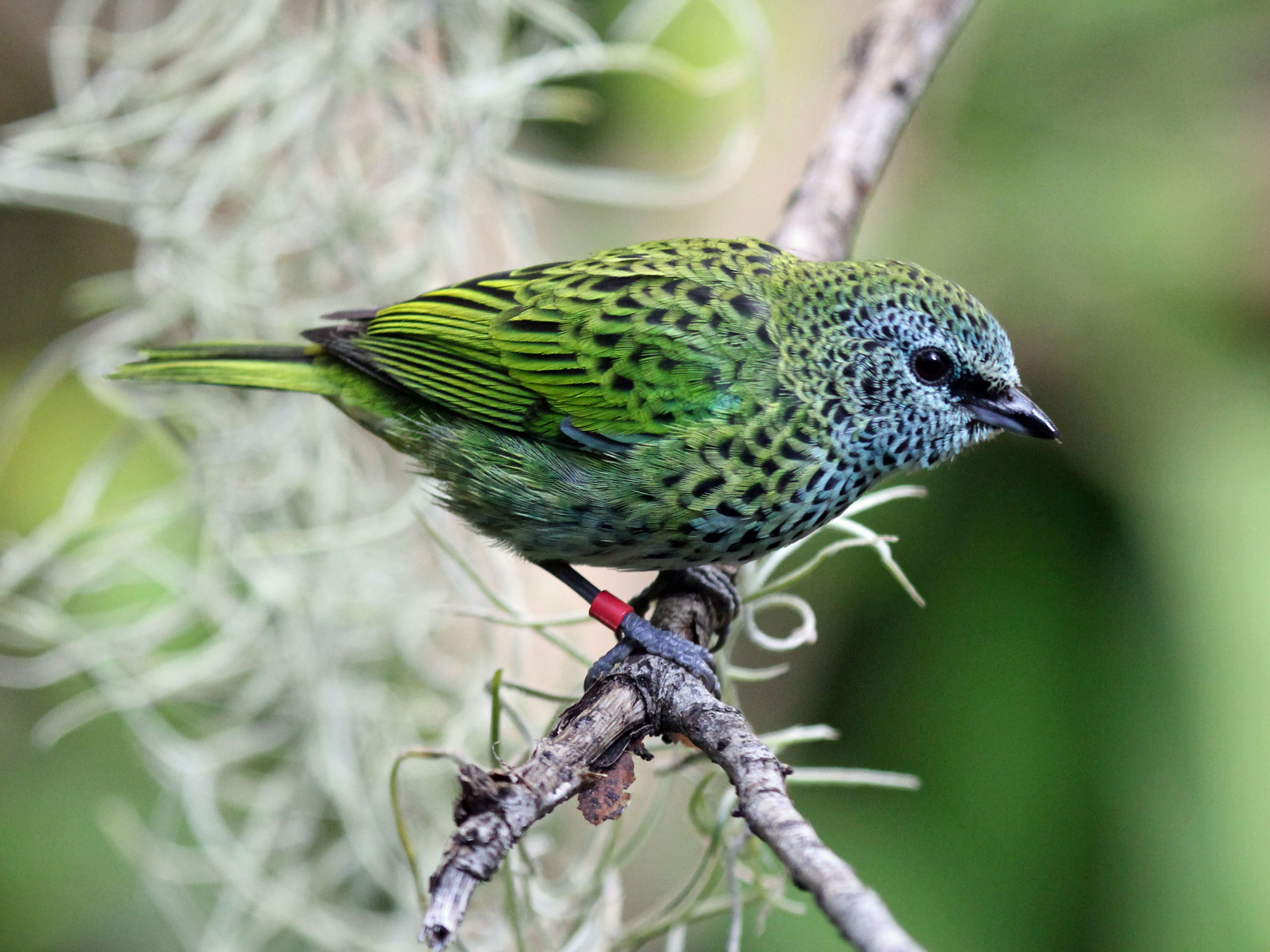
Spotted tanager at San Diego Zoo
