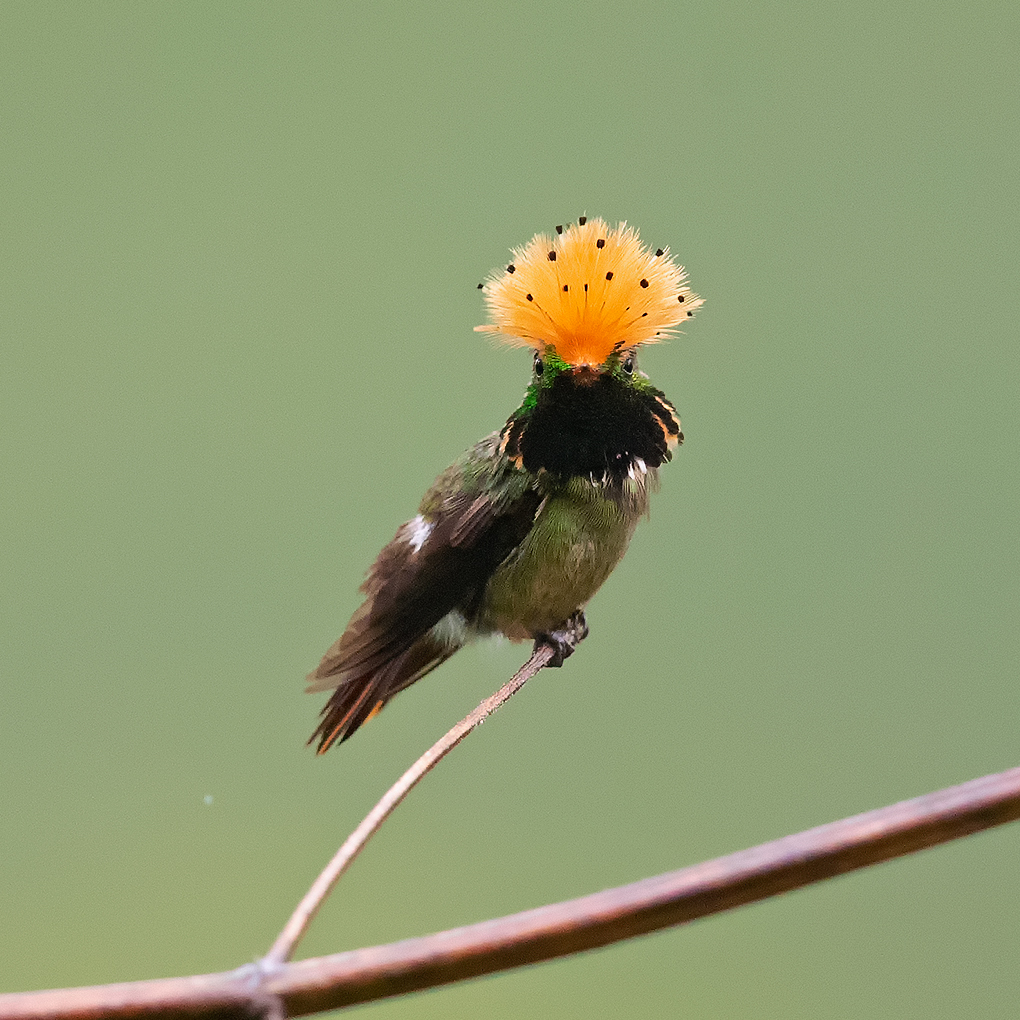
- Male spangled coquette

Conservation status
- Least Concern (IUCN 3.1)
- CITES Appendix II

Scientific classification
- Kingdom: Animalia
- Phylum: Chordata
- Class: Aves
- Order: Apodiformes
- Family: Trochilidae
- Genus: Lophornis
- Species: L. stictolophus

Binomial name
- Lophornis stictolophus Salvin & Elliot, 1873

= Spangled coquette =

Species of hummingbird

The spangled coquette, coquette pailletée (French), coqueta coronada, or coqueta lentejuelada (both Spanish) (Lophornis stictolophus) is a species of hummingbird in the "coquettes", tribe Lesbiini of subfamily Lesbiinae. It is found in Brazil, Colombia, Ecuador, Peru, and Venezuela.

== Taxonomy and systematics ==
The spangled coquette is believed to be most closely related to the short-crested coquette (L. brachylophus) and rufous-crested coquette (L. delattrei). It is monotypic.

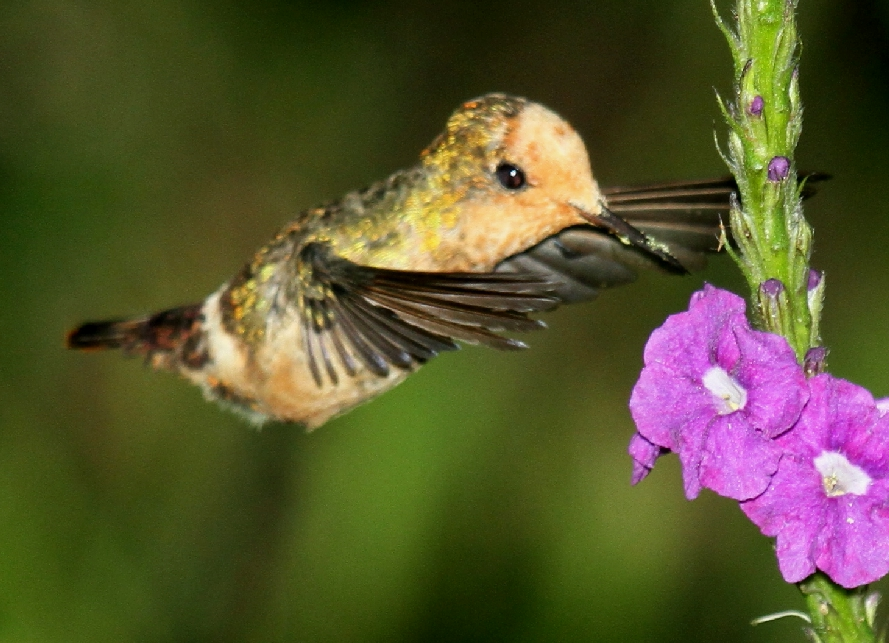
Copalinga Lodge, Ecuador / flash photo

== Description ==
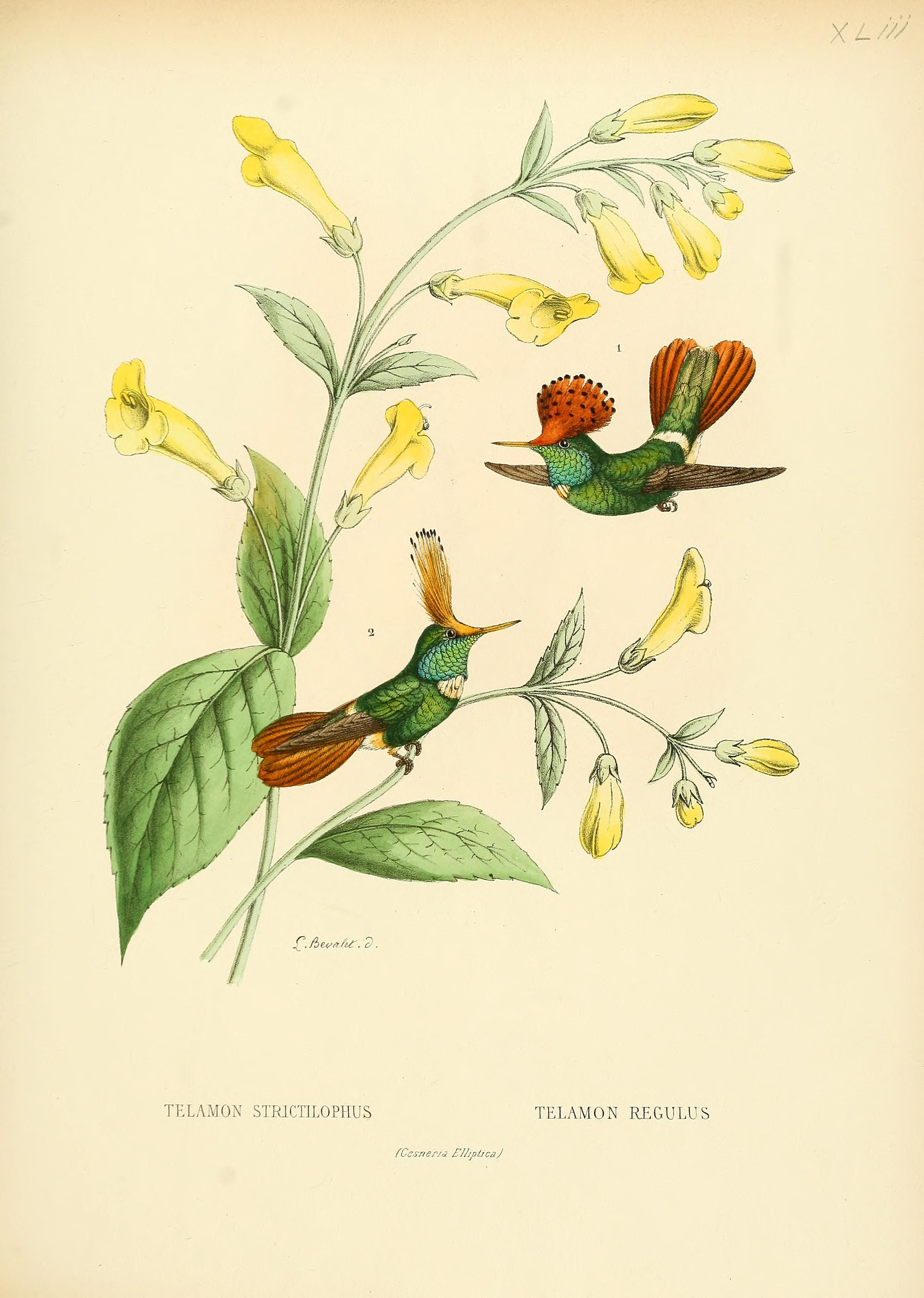
Lithograph of a spangled coquette (left) and rufous-crested coquette (right)

The spangled coquette is 6.4 to 6.9 cm (2.5 to 2.7 in) long. Both sexes have a short, straight, red bill with a black tip and bronzy green upperparts with a white band across the rump. Their lower rump and uppertail coverts are purplish bronze. Adult males have a short, bushy, rufous crest with black tips on the feathers, and short rufous and iridescent green cheek tufts. Its throat is iridescent green with a few white-tipped feathers and the rest of the underparts bronzy green. Its central tail feathers are green and the rest cinnamon-rufous with black tips. The adult female does not have the male's crest or cheek tufts. It has a whitish throat with large rufous spots. It underparts are cinnamon, often with green spots. The central tail feathers are green and the rest are cinnamon with black bars near the end and buff tips. Juveniles are similar to the adult female but have a grayish throat.

== Distribution and habitat ==
According to the International Ornithological Committee (IOC) and Clements taxonomy, the spangled coquette is found from western Venezuela south through eastern Colombia and Ecuador into northern Peru. The South American Classification Committee of the American Ornithological Society (SACC) places it in Brazil as well. It inhabits the edges and clearings of humid forest, cerrado, and drier scrubby landscapes. In elevation it is found as high as 1,300 m (4,300 ft).

== Behavior ==
=== Movement ===
The spangled coquette is sedentary.

=== Feeding ===
The spangled coquette feeds on the nectar of a variety of flowering plants, typically at tree-top level, though details of its diet are lacking. It "steals" nectar from the territories of larger hummingbirds. It catches arthropods by hawking from a perch.

=== Breeding ===
Nothing is known about the spangled coquette's breeding phenology.

=== Vocal and non-vocal sounds ===
The spangled coquette is mostly silent. It gives "a high, sharp 'tsip'" while feeding. Its wings make "a low bee-like humming" when hovering.

== Status ==
The IUCN originally assessed the spangled coquette as Near Threatened but since 2004 has rated it as being of Least Concern. Its population size and trend are not known. It is "[g]enerally rare, but no immediate threats recorded so far" and appears to accept some human-made habitats.

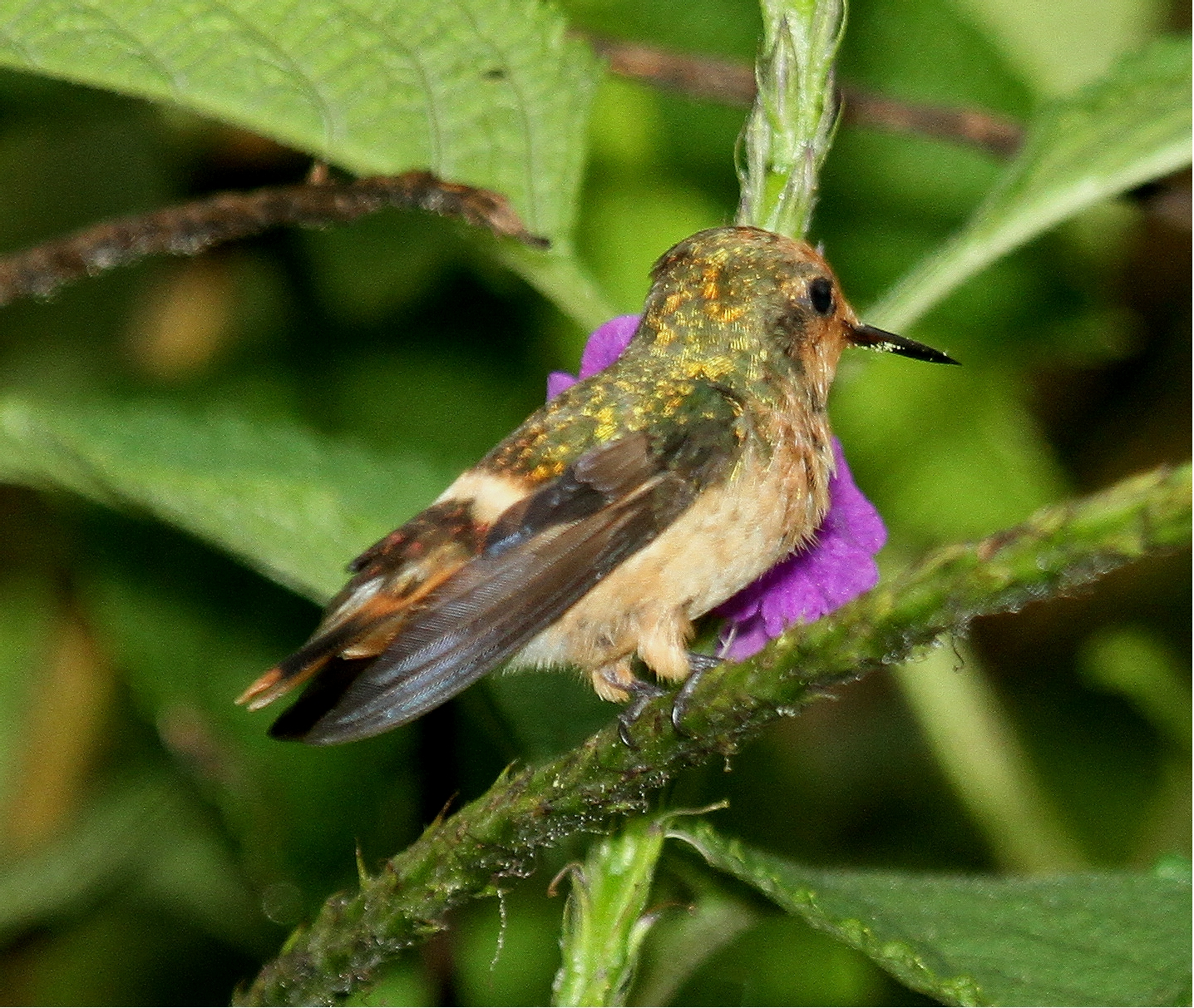
Copalinga Lodge, Ecuador / flash photo

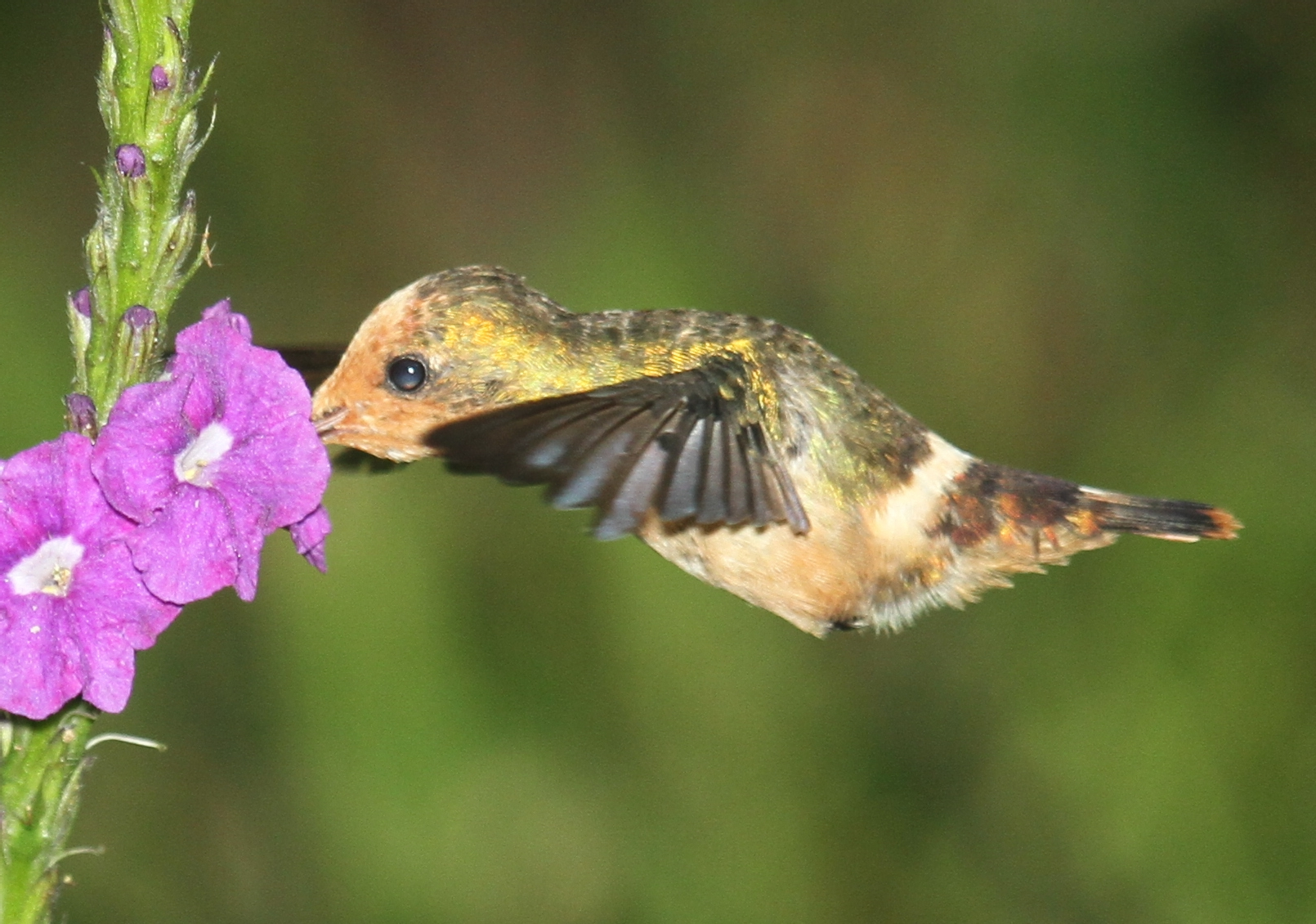
Copalinga Lodge, Ecuador / flash photo
