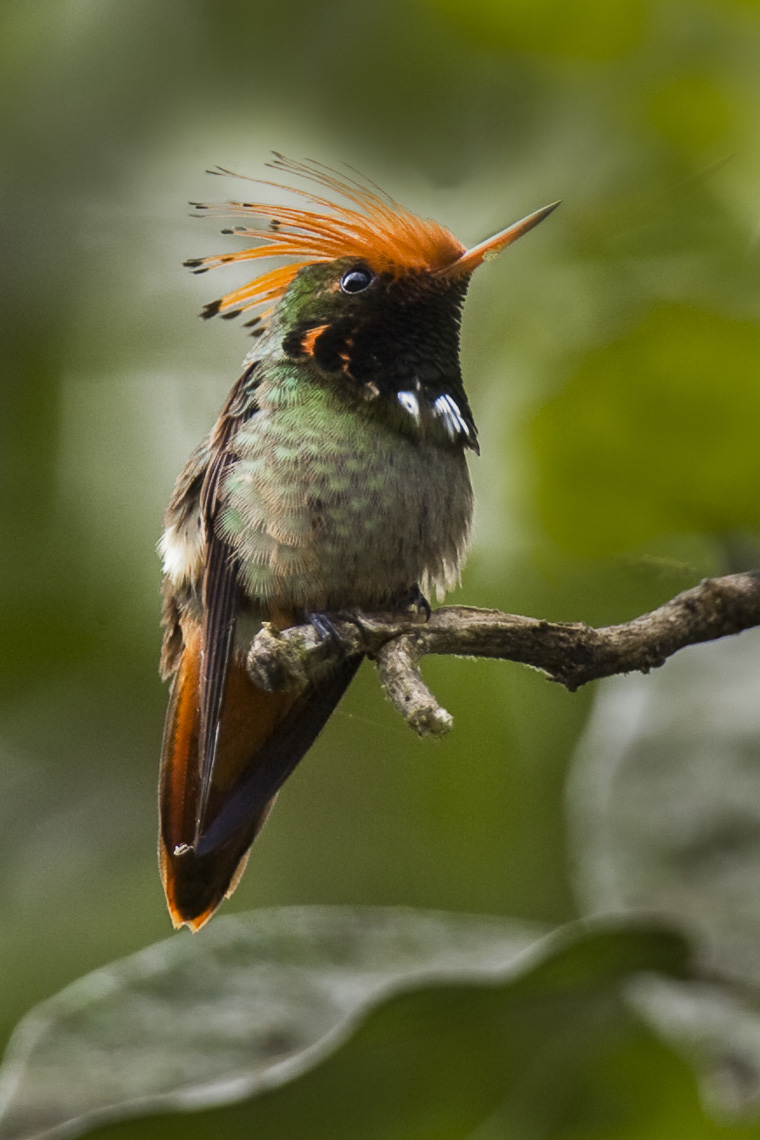

Conservation status
- Least Concern (IUCN 3.1)
- CITES Appendix II

Scientific classification
- Kingdom: Animalia
- Phylum: Chordata
- Class: Aves
- Clade: Strisores
- Order: Apodiformes
- Family: Trochilidae
- Genus: Lophornis
- Species: L. delattrei

Binomial name
- Lophornis delattrei (Lesson, 1839)

= Rufous-crested coquette =

Species of bird

The rufous-crested coquette (Lophornis delattrei) is a species of hummingbird native to the tropical slopes of pacific South America. Due to its small size and population, it is a rare sight even within its native region. Males of the species can be easily distinguished by their striking rufous coloured spiked crests, and females, while less obvious, can be identified by their small size and rufous coloured foreheads.

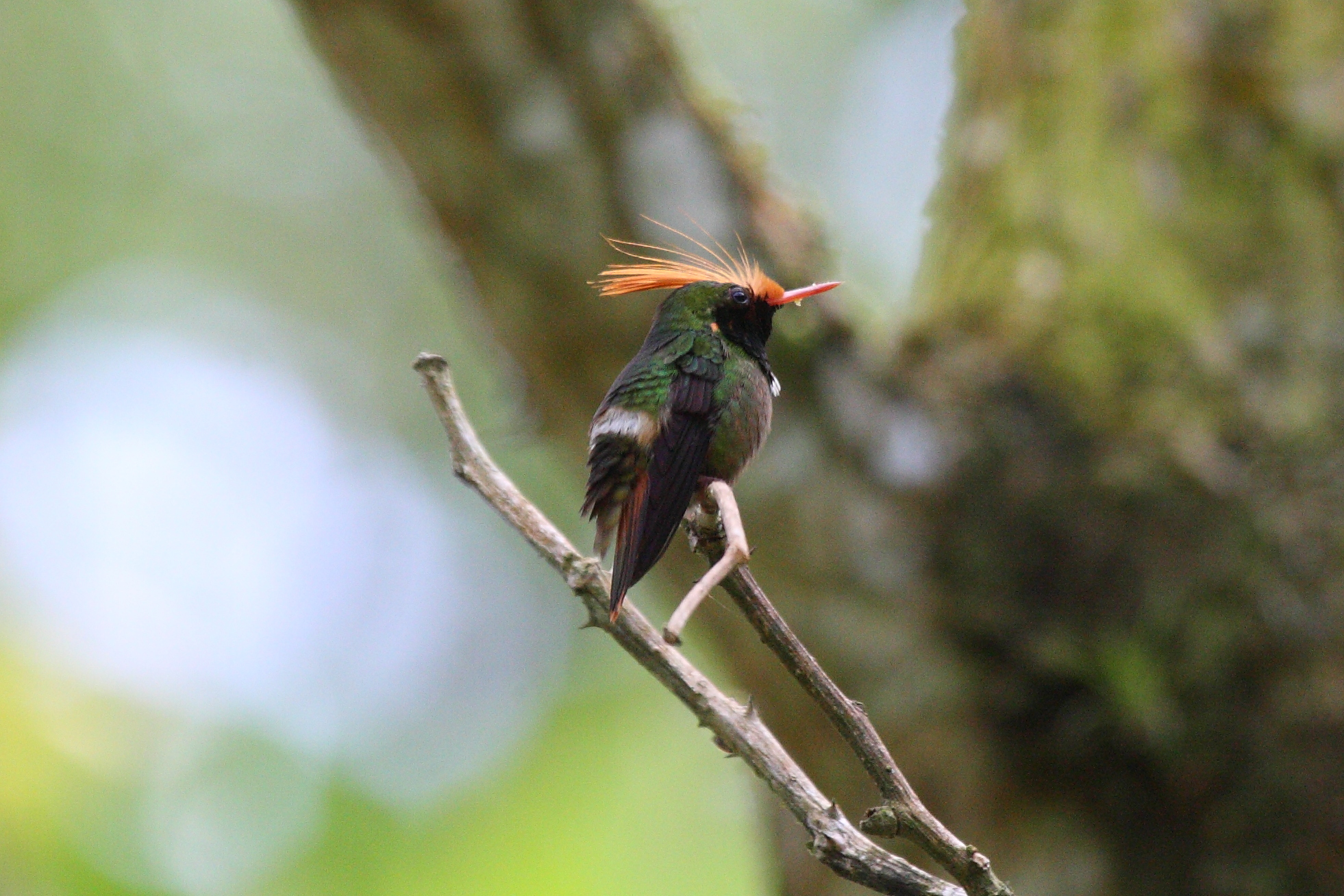
In Panama

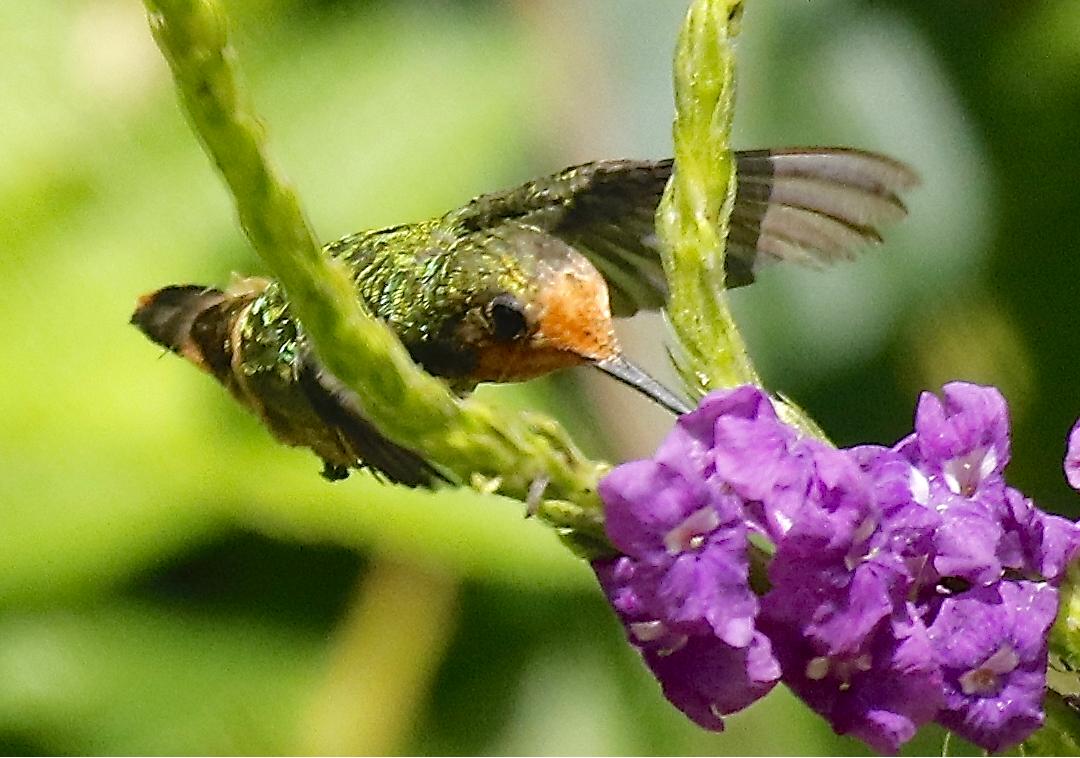
Female. Canopy Camp - Darien, Panama

== Taxonomy ==
The rufous-crested coquette is a bird in the family Trochilidae, which includes all extant species of hummingbirds. It is a member of the genus Lophornis, which was identified first by the French naturalist and surgeon René Lesson in 1829, and includes a number of extremely small hummingbirds distributed across central and south America. The rufous-crested coquette was identified by Lesson in 1839, and is thought to be closely related to the tufted coquette.

=== Subspecies ===
An extremely similar species of coquette is endemic to a small region of Guerrero Mexico. This bird's taxonomic classification is debated, and some ornithologists list it as the independent coquette species Lophornis brachylophus, but has also been classified as a subspecies of the rufous-crested coquette, L. d. brachylopha.

== Description ==
Rufous-Crested Coquettes are of 6.4 cm to 7.0 cm in length, have a wingspan of 4.0 cm to 4.5 cm, and have weigh an average of 2.8g. This species has a short orange bill that ends in a sharp blackened point. Its back and stomach is a light iridescent green. A band of white feathers crosses the rump, and brown, orange, and green tail feathers extend posteriorly from it. The adult male has a crest of slender and rigid black tipped rufous feathers, that extend dorsally from its rufous coloured head feathers. It has a throat of darker iridescent green feathers which ends posteriorly in small pointed white feathers. A vertical band of rufous feathers frames the green throat and tail feathers of the males, and the tail ends in a double-rounded shape. Female rufous-crested coquettes share a similar physiology to the males, with a few key defining differences. Females display no head crests, and instead their rufous coloured forehead feathers fade into the iridescent green ones which extend down their backs. Their throats are not uniformly green, but instead are primarily white with small clusters of green feathers. A band of rufous feathers extends fully from the side of the throat up to the forehead. The tail of the female rufous-crested coquette is singly rounded, and the tail feathers, while primarily green, end in small patches of light orange.

== Behaviour ==
=== Foraging ===
These hummingbirds forage primarily in sparsely forested regions which present low flowering plant species. They feed on nectar of flowering plants present in humid evergreen forests ecosystems, favouring clearings, forest openings, and roadsides. Specifically, they have been observed foraging around the small white flowers of trees and shrubs in the Inga genus, as well as the flowers of Myrtaceae, and Verbenaceae plants. Small insects have also been observed being caught by the species through hawking. The small body size of Coquette hummingbirds makes it impossible for them to compete successfully with other hummingbird species for food, thus they forage over larger distances than most genus.

=== Reproduction ===
While no mating or egg laying has been observed in this species to date, they do present a similar courtship ritual to other Coquette species. This ritual involves a male performing a series of lateral oscillating flights in front of a perched female, displaying its crest while doing so.

=== Flight ===
Coquette hummingbirds exhibit a distinctive vertical pumping of their tails when in flight. This pumping motion gives the birds an insect-like appearance, and often results in them being mistaken for sphinx moths, which share similar habitats and body sizes to the hummingbirds.

=== Vocalizations ===
Rufous-crested coquettes are primarily silent, however, they have been recorded to make a sharp "tsip" noise when foraging on nectar, as well as soft chipping sounds. Their rapid wingbeats produce a quiet humming sound when in flight.

== Distribution ==
The species inhabits the Pacific and Caribbean mountainsides of Peru, Bolivia, Colombia, Ecuador, Panama, and Costa Rica; and at least one observation of the species has been reported in western Brazil. The species is primarily found in altitudes of 500m 1,900m above sea level, likely inhabiting higher altitudes when breeding and lower when not. Rufous-crested Croquettes favour humid forests with evergreen or semi-deciduous compositions, and travel large distances within these ecosystems in search of suitable foods. In a homing experiment with frilled coquettes, this genetically similar species was seen to navigate ranges of up to 15 km.

== Conservation ==
The rufous-crested coquette is rare yet its populations appear stable, and the IUCN red list ranks this species as one of lest concern. While habitat loss due to deforestation is a major problem for bird species in South America, since the rufous-crested coquette feeds in open areas and forest clearings it is affected to a lesser degree.
