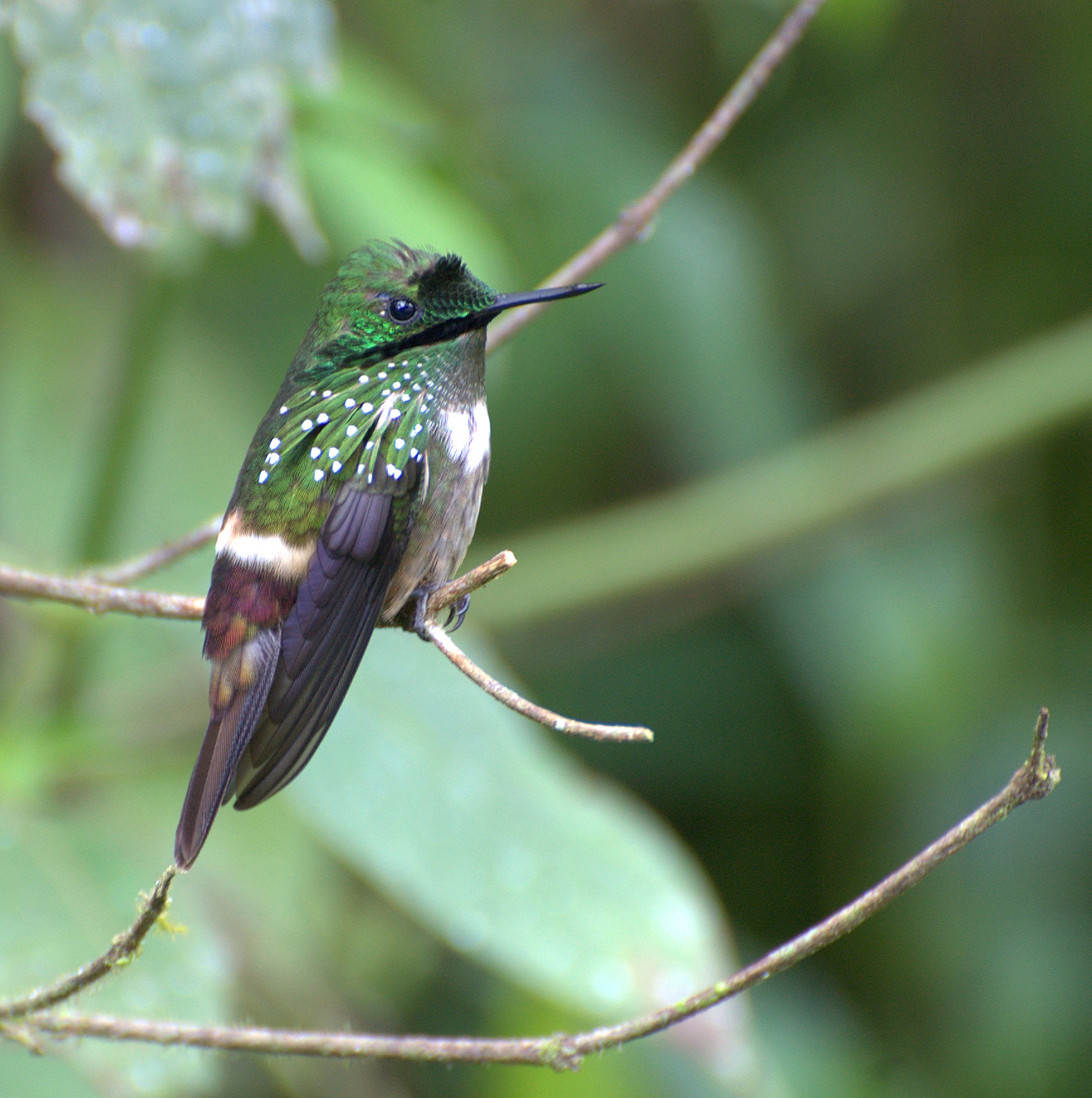
- Male

Conservation status
- Least Concern (IUCN 3.1)
- CITES Appendix II

Scientific classification
- Kingdom: Animalia
- Phylum: Chordata
- Class: Aves
- Order: Apodiformes
- Family: Trochilidae
- Genus: Lophornis
- Species: L. chalybeus

Binomial name
- Lophornis chalybeus (Temminck, 1821)

= Festive coquette =

Species of hummingbird

The festive coquette (Lophornis chalybeus) is a species of hummingbird in the "coquettes", tribe Lesbiini of subfamily Lesbiinae. It is endemic to Brazil.

== Taxonomy and systematics ==
The festive coquette and what are now the butterfly coquette (L. verreauxii) and peacock coquette (L. pavoninus) were for a time placed in genus Polemistria that was soon merged into the current Lophornis. The butterfly coquette was treated as conspecific with the festive coquette but was split as its own species in 2019. The festive coquette is monotypic.

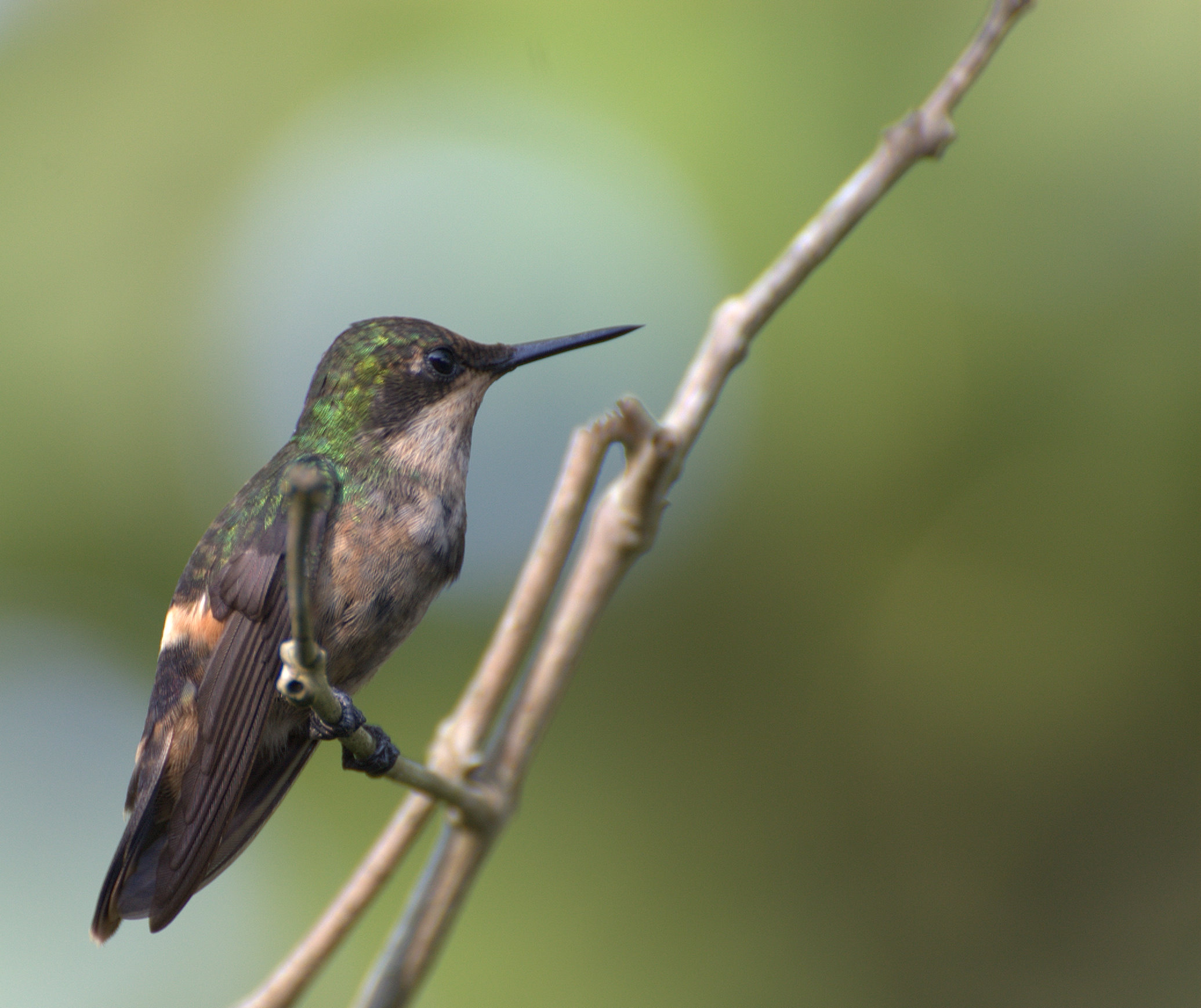
Female

== Description ==
The festive coquette is 7.5 to 9.1 cm (3.0 to 3.6 in) long; adults weigh about 3 g (0.11 oz). Both sexes have a short, straight, black bill. Their upperparts are bronzy green with a pale band across the rump, their lower rump and undertail coverts are purplish bronze, and their tail is purplish copper with pale tips on the outer feathers. Adult males have an iridescent green forehead with a band of stiff black feathers around it. They have green cheek tufts tipped with white and a ruff around the bill and chin that is glittering green with white tips. Their breast is whitish streaked with black and the belly grayish brown with a blackish stripe down the middle. The adult female has blackish cheeks without the male's tufts but with a white "moustache". Its chin is pale buff with a dark spot in the center and the rest of the underparts are brownish with whitish scaling. Juveniles are similar to the adult female.

== Distribution and habitat ==
The festive coquette is found in southeastern Brazil from Espírito Santo south into Santa Catarina. Several records in northeastern Argentina have not been confirmed so the South American Classification Committee of the American Ornithological Society (SACC) lists it as hypothetical in that country. It inhabits humid primary and secondary forests and also cerrado. In elevation it ranges from sea level to 1,000 m (3,300 ft).

== Behavior ==
=== Movement ===
The festive coquette is almost entirely sedentary, though seasonal dispersal might account for the Argentina records.

=== Feeding ===
The festive coquette's diet is nectar and small insects. It feeds by hovering to withdraw nectar from a wide variety of flowers but also might pierce the base of flowers to "rob" nectar. It has been observed trap-lining in limited areas. It does not defend feeding territories but will aggressively compete with other festive coquettes at a flowering plant. It might glean insects from foliage in addition to capturing them in flight.

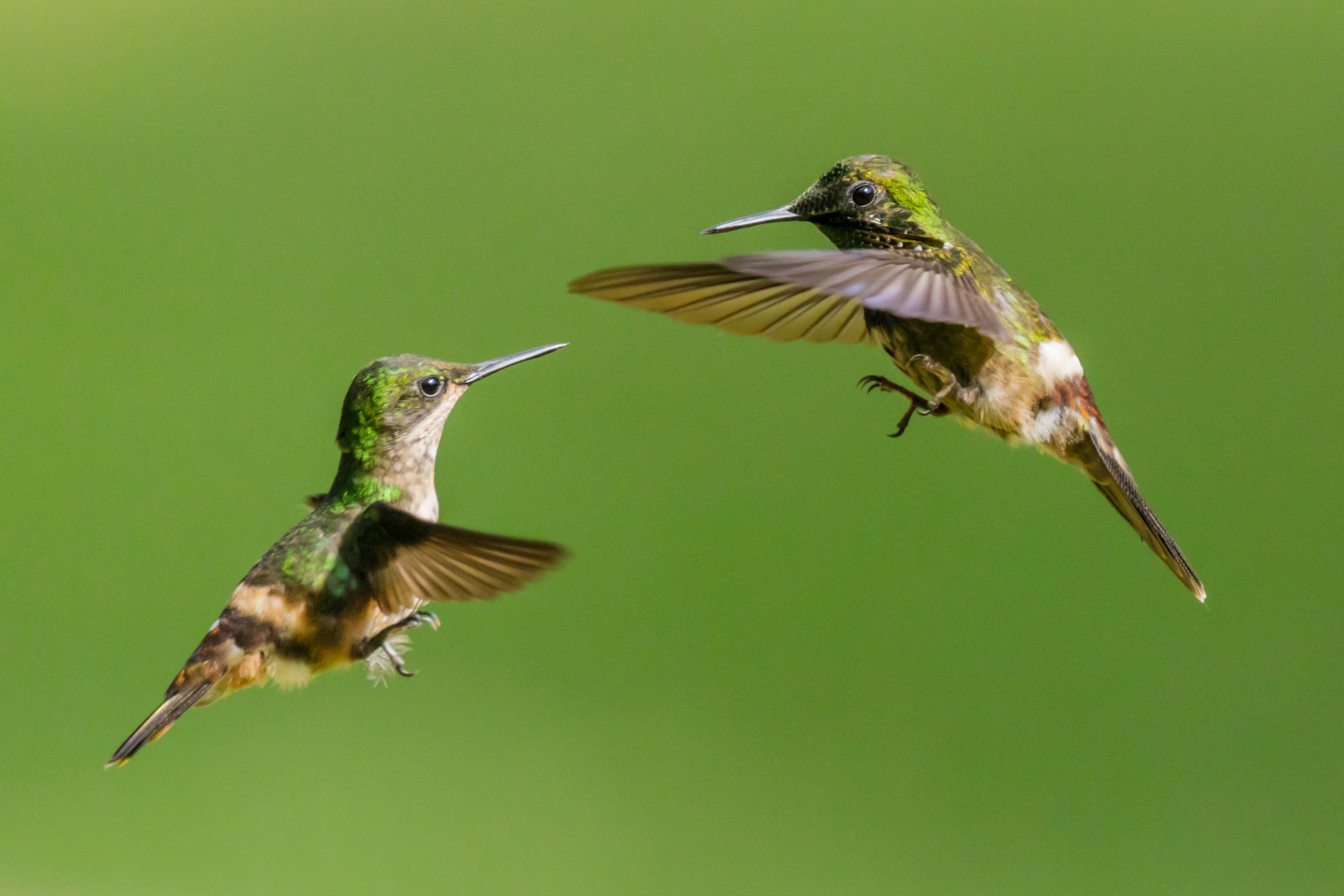
Male displaying for female

=== Breeding ===
Male festive coquettes display for females by hovering and flaring its forehead and cheek patch feathers. The breeding season has been reported by different authors to be August to November but also from October to February. The nest is a cup of soft plant down and is usually hung from the tip of thin branches between 2 and 5 m (6.6 and 16.4 ft) above the ground. The female incubates the clutch of two eggs for 13 to 14 days; fledging occurs about 22 days after hatch.

=== Vocal and non-vocal sounds ===
The festive coquette is mostly silent. It gives "a short 'tsip' or 'chip'" while feeding. Its wings make "a low bee-like humming" when hovering.

== Status ==
The IUCN has assessed the festive coquette as Near Threatened. Its population size and trend are not known. It has a limited range, and though it occurs in some protected areas, its habitat is "under threat of deforestation".
