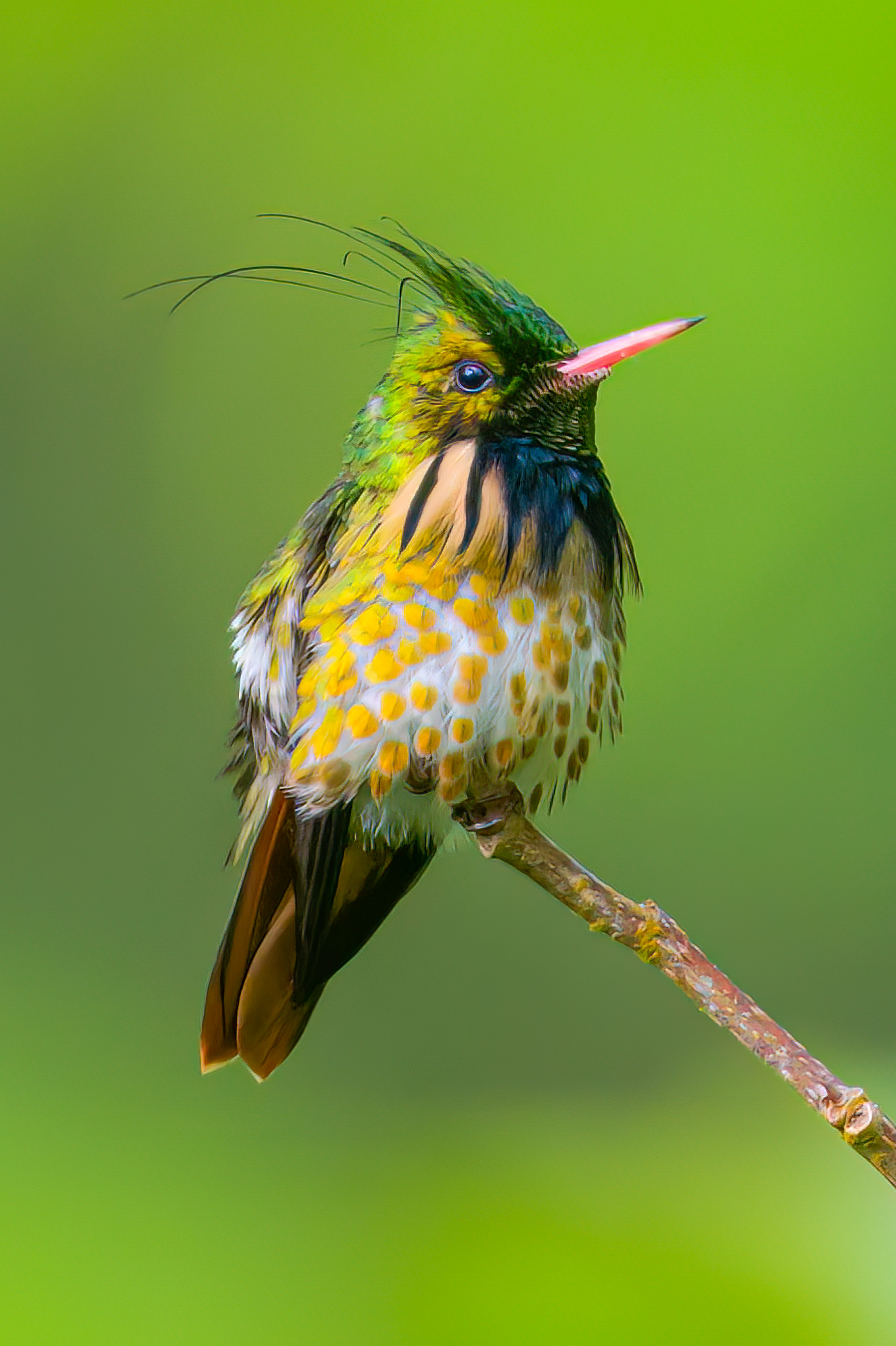

Conservation status
- Least Concern (IUCN 3.1)
- CITES Appendix II

Scientific classification
- Kingdom: Animalia
- Phylum: Chordata
- Class: Aves
- Order: Apodiformes
- Family: Trochilidae
- Genus: Lophornis
- Species: L. helenae

Binomial name
- Lophornis helenae (Delattre, 1843)

Synonyms
- Ornismya helenae

= Black-crested coquette =

Species of hummingbird

The black-crested coquette (Lophornis helenae) is a species of hummingbird in the "coquettes", tribe Lesbiini of subfamily Lesbiinae. It is found in Belize, Costa Rica, Guatemala, Honduras, Mexico, and Nicaragua.

== Taxonomy and systematics ==
The black-crested coquette was originally described as Ornismya helenae. Later it and the white-crested coquette (Lophornis adorabilis) were placed in genus Paphosia. The black-crested coquette is monotypic.

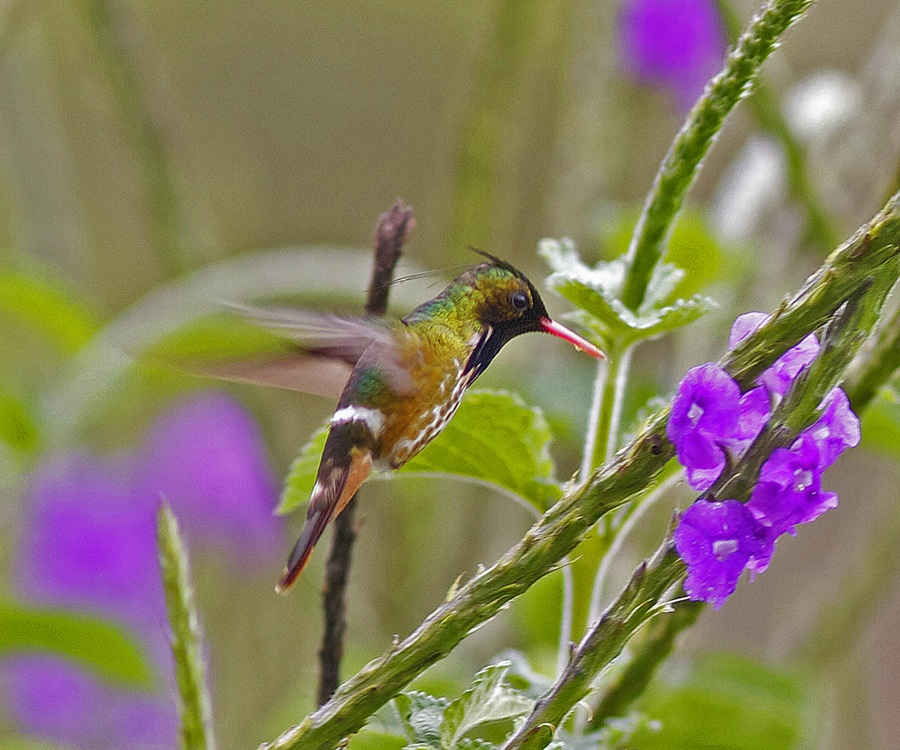
Black-crested coquette feeding on blue porterweeds

== Description ==
The black-crested coquette is 6.3 to 7.7 cm (2.5 to 3.0 in) long with an average weight of 2.6 to 2.8 g (0.092 to 0.099 oz). The adult male has a dark metallic green crown with a wispy greenish black crest. The nape and back are metallic bronze green; a white band separates the back from the sooty blackish rump and uppertail coverts. The central tail feathers are dull greenish bronze between their cinnamon rufous bases and dusky ends. The outer tail feathers are cinnamon rufous. The chin and upper throat are metallic yellowish green with a velvety black band below. The sides of the throat have tufts of buff feathers with velvety black margins. The breast is metallic bronze, the belly and flanks white with metallic bronze spots, and the undertail coverts cinnamon rufous. Its bill is bright red with a black tip.

The adult female has dark metallic green to bronze green upperparts with a narrow white band across the rump. Its crown is plain, without the male's crest. The lower rump and uppertail coverts are black with a bronze gloss. The central tail feathers are olive bronzy between cinnamon rufous bases and blackish ends. The outer tail feathers are cinnamon rufous with a wide black band near the end. The face is black. The chin and throat vary widely from pale grayish buff to cinnamon tones and lack the male's tufts. The breast is metallic bronze, the belly white with metallic bronze spots, and the undertail coverts cinnamon rufous. Its maxilla is black and the mandible red with a dark tip.

Immature males resemble the adult female but with a smaller crest than the adult's and a whitish throat with a small black "apron". Immature females resemble the adults.

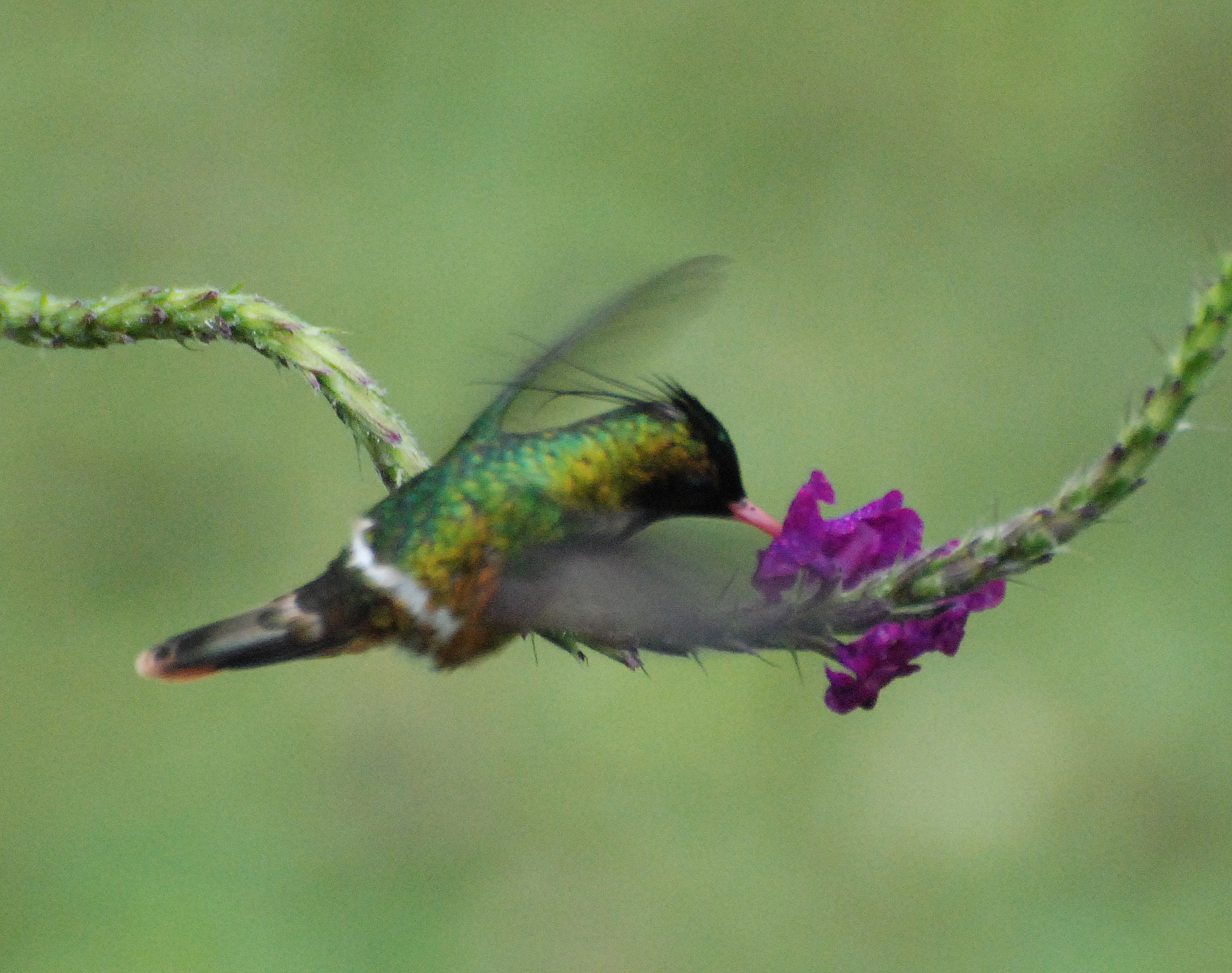

== Distribution and habitat ==
The black-crested coquette is found from southern Veracruz in Mexico south through eastern Guatemala, southern Belize, and eastern Honduras and Nicaragua into eastern Costa Rica. A separate population is on the Pacific side of Central America from Chiapas in Mexico south through much of western Guatemala. The species inhabits semi-open landscapes at the edges of humid montane and lowland evergreen forests. It also occurs in gaps in the forest and brushy areas. In elevation it ranges from sea level to 1,500 m (4,900 ft) in Mexico and between 300 and 1,200 m (980 and 3,940 ft) in Costa Rica.

== Behavior ==
=== Movement ===
The black-crested coquette is a year-round resident in most of its range but altitudinal movements have been noted in Costa Rica.

=== Feeding ===
The black-crested coquette feeds on nectar, which is mostly sought in the canopy but also at lower levels. It usually forages by trap-lining, visiting a circuit of flowering trees, and hovers to feed. It also feeds on small arthropods that it gleans in flight from foliage.

=== Breeding ===
Almost nothing is known about the black-crested coquette's breeding phenology. One nest in Costa Rica was active in March; it was a small cup at the end of a twig 8 m (26 ft) above the ground at the edge of forest.

=== Vocalization ===
The black-crested coquette is usually silent. A vocalization thought to be its song is "a clear, upslurred tsuwee, repeated". It has also been reported making a "thin, high twittering when fighting and a quiet, slightly metallic teek when feeding".

== Status ==
The IUCN has assessed the black-crested coquette as being of Least Concern, though its population size and trend are not known. It is " vulnerable to widespread habitat loss or degradation, but otherwise human activity probably has little short term effect on this species."
