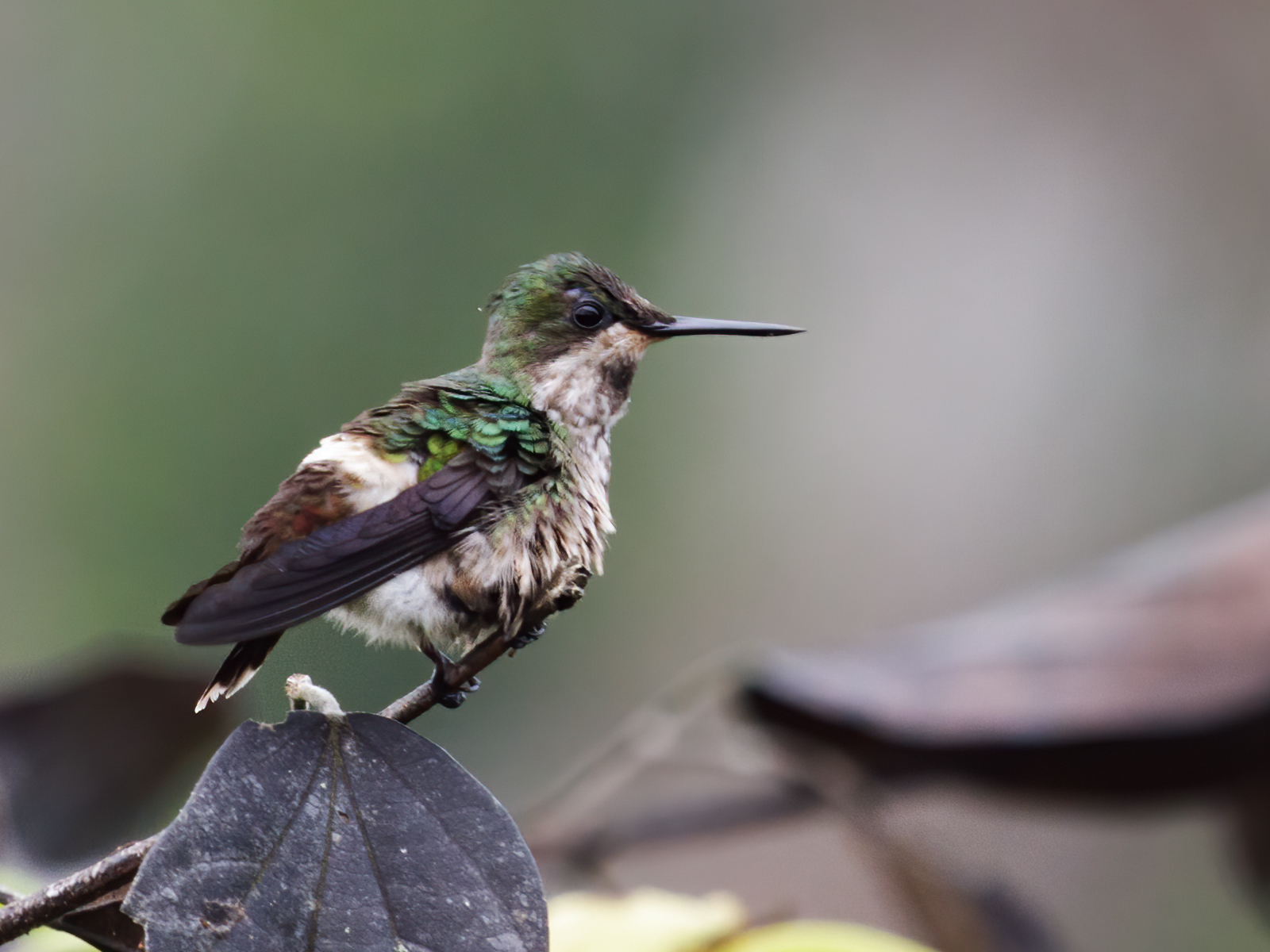

Conservation status
- Least Concern (IUCN 3.1)
- CITES Appendix II

Scientific classification
- Kingdom: Animalia
- Phylum: Chordata
- Class: Aves
- Order: Apodiformes
- Family: Trochilidae
- Genus: Lophornis
- Species: L. verreauxii

Binomial name
- Lophornis verreauxii Bourcier, 1853

= Butterfly coquette =

Species of hummingbird

The butterfly coquette (Lophornis verreauxii) is a species of hummingbird in the "coquettes", tribe Lesbiini of subfamily Lesbiinae. It is found in Bolivia, Brazil, Colombia, Ecuador, Peru, and Venezuela.

== Taxonomy and systematics ==
The butterfly coquette was formerly treated as a subspecies of the festive coquette (Lophornis chalybeus), and that species and the peacock coquette (L. pavoninus) were also for a time placed in genus Polemistria. In 2019 the South American Classification Committee (SACC) of the American Ornithological Society accepted the festive coquette as a separate species. The International Ornithological Committee (IOC) and BirdLife International's Handbook of the Birds of the World (HBW) adopted the split in 2020. The Clements taxonomy did not make updates in 2020 and adopted the split in 2021.

The butterfly coquette has two subspecies, the nominate L. v. verreauxii and L. v. klagesi.

== Description ==
The butterfly coquette is 7.5 to 9.1 cm (3.0 to 3.6 in) long. The male of the nominate subspecies has a deep green head with a long, red-tipped, green crest and long green "whiskers" with white tips. Its back is green with golden highlights, deep reddish uppertail coverts, and a white band on the rump. The underparts are green but for white thighs and the tail is maroon. The female does not have the crest and "whiskers" but does have a whitish malar patch. The uppertail coverts are a less intense red than those of the male and it has golden highlights on the breast. Both sexes of subspecies L. v. klagesi are darker overall than the nominate, and their uppertail coverts are bronzy olive and the tail bronzy green.

== Distribution and habitat ==
The nominate subspecies of butterfly coquette is found from Amazonian Colombia, Ecuador, and Peru into Brazil as far east as Mato Grosso and south into central Bolivia. L. v. klagesi is restricted to the Río Caura watershed in Venezuela's Bolívar state. The species inhabits a variety of humid landscapes including riparian forest, white sand scrub forest, and terra firme forest. It also occurs in secondary forest and scrubby fields. In elevation it ranges as high as 1,000 m (3,300 ft).

== Behavior ==
=== Movement ===
The butterfly coquette is essentially sedentary, though some short-distance seasonal movement is thought to occur.

=== Feeding ===
The butterfly coquette feeds on nectar, which is mostly sought in the canopy but also at lower levels. The species usually hovers to take nectar but has been recorded piercing the base of flowers to "steal" it. It has been observed trap-lining, visiting a circuit of flowering plants. It does not appear to defend a territory but will dispute conspecifics at a flower patch. The species also eats small insects that it apparently gleans from foliage.

=== Breeding ===
The butterfly coquette's breeding phenology has not been studied nor have the nest and eggs been described.

=== Vocalization ===
The butterfly coquette is usually silent but makes "short tsip or chip" calls when feeding. One audio recording is available at Cornell University's Macaulay Library.

== Status ==
The IUCN has assessed the butterfly coquette as being of Least Concern, though its population size is not known and thought to be decreasing. It occurs in a few protected areas but is uncommon to rare and patchily distributed throughout its range.
