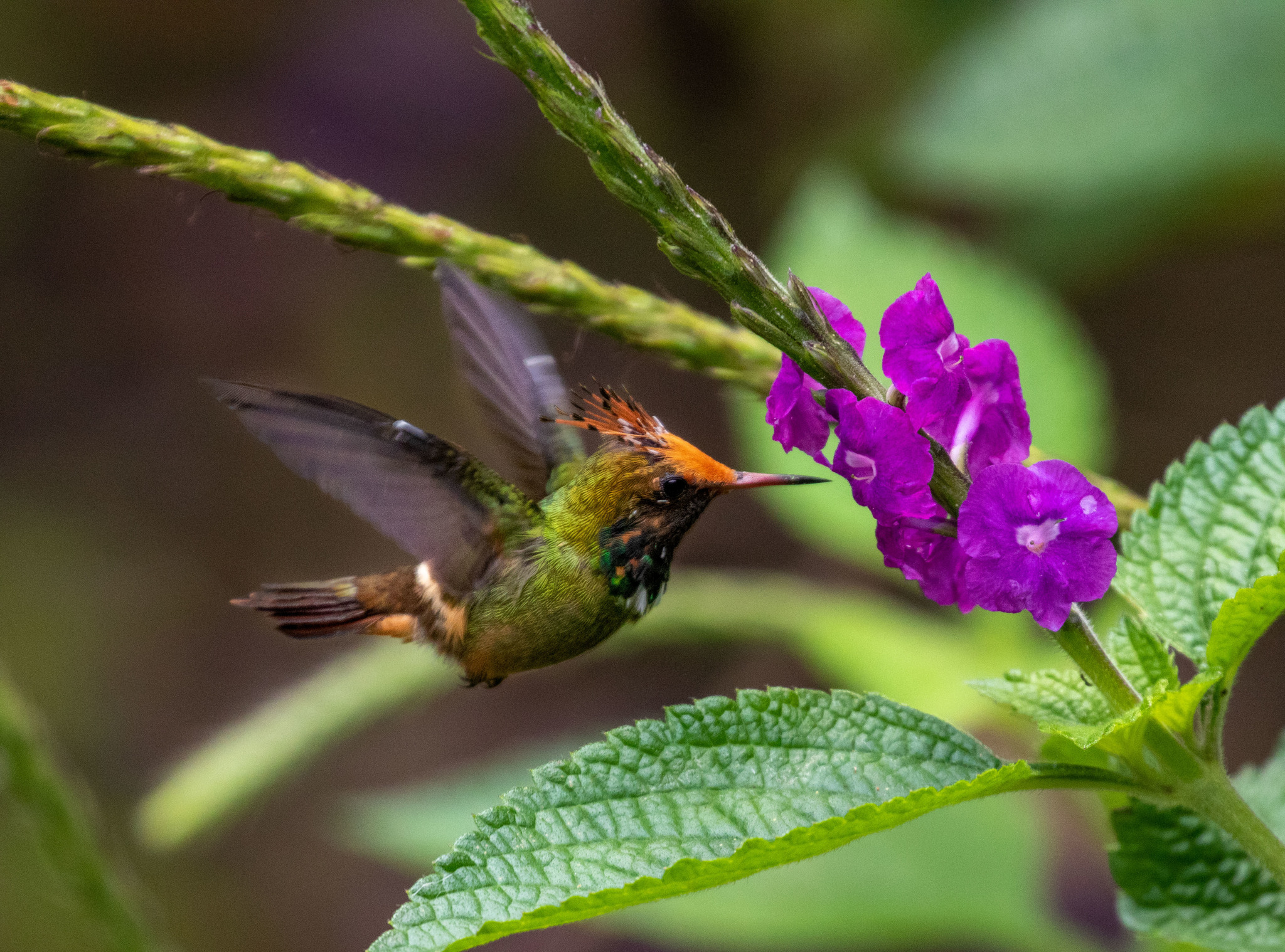
- Rufous-crested coquette

Scientific classification
- Kingdom: Animalia
- Phylum: Chordata
- Class: Aves
- Order: Apodiformes
- Family: Trochilidae
- Tribe: Lesbiini
- Genus: Lophornis; Lesson, 1829

Type species
- Trochilus ornatus Boddaert, 1783

Species
- see text

= Lophornis =

Genus of hummingbirds

Lophornis is a genus of hummingbird in the family Trochilidae. These are all tiny birds, ranking among the smallest hummingbirds. No species exceeds 9 cm (3.5 in) and most are under 7.5 cm (3.0 in) in total length, weighing 3 grams or less. The male coquettes are noted from their outlandish, colorful crests and markings, the females being more subdued.

== Taxonomy and species list ==
The genus Lophornis was introduced by the French naturalist René Lesson in 1829. The type species was subsequently designated as the tufted coquette (Lophornis ornatus). The generic name combines the Ancient Greek lophos meaning "crest" or "tuft" with ornis meaning "bird".

The genus contains the following eleven species:

Genus Lophornis – Lesson, 1829 – eleven species
Common name	Scientific name and subspecies	Range	Size and ecology	IUCN status and estimated population
White-crested coquette Male Female	Lophornis adorabilis Salvin, 1870	Costa Rica and Panama	Size: Habitat: Diet:	LC
Short-crested coquette Male	Lophornis brachylophus R. T. Moore, 1949	Mexico	Size: Habitat: Diet:	CR
Festive coquette Male Female	Lophornis chalybeus (Temminck, 1821)	southeast Brazil	Size: Habitat: Diet:	LC
Butterfly coquette Female	Lophornis verreauxii Bourcier, 1853 Two subspecies: L. v. verreauxii; L. v. klagesi	northwest Brazil, Colombia, Venezuela, Ecuador and Peru	Size: Habitat: Diet:	LC
Dot-eared coquette Male	Lophornis gouldii (Lesson, RP, 1832)	Bolivia and Brazil	Size: Habitat: Diet:	NT
Rufous-crested coquette Male Female	Lophornis delattrei (Lesson, 1839) Two subspecies: L. d. brachylopha; L. d. delattrei	Bolivia, Colombia, Ecuador, Panama, and Peru.	Size: Habitat: Diet:	LC
Black-crested coquette Male Female	Lophornis helenae (Delattre, 1843)	Belize, Costa Rica, Guatemala, Honduras, Mexico, and Nicaragua.	Size: Habitat: Diet:	LC
Frilled coquette Male	Lophornis magnificus (Vieillot, 1817)	Brazil.	Size: Habitat: Diet:	LC
Peacock coquette	Lophornis pavoninus Salvin & Godman, 1882	Venezuela and adjacent areas of Brazil and Guyana.	Size: Habitat: Diet:	LC
Spangled coquette Male Female	Lophornis stictolophus Salvin & Elliot, 1873	Brazil, Colombia, Ecuador, Peru, and Venezuela	Size: Habitat: Diet:	LC
Tufted coquette Male	Lophornis ornatus (Boddaert, 1783)	eastern Venezuela, Trinidad, Guiana, and northern Brazil.	Size: Habitat: Diet:	LC
