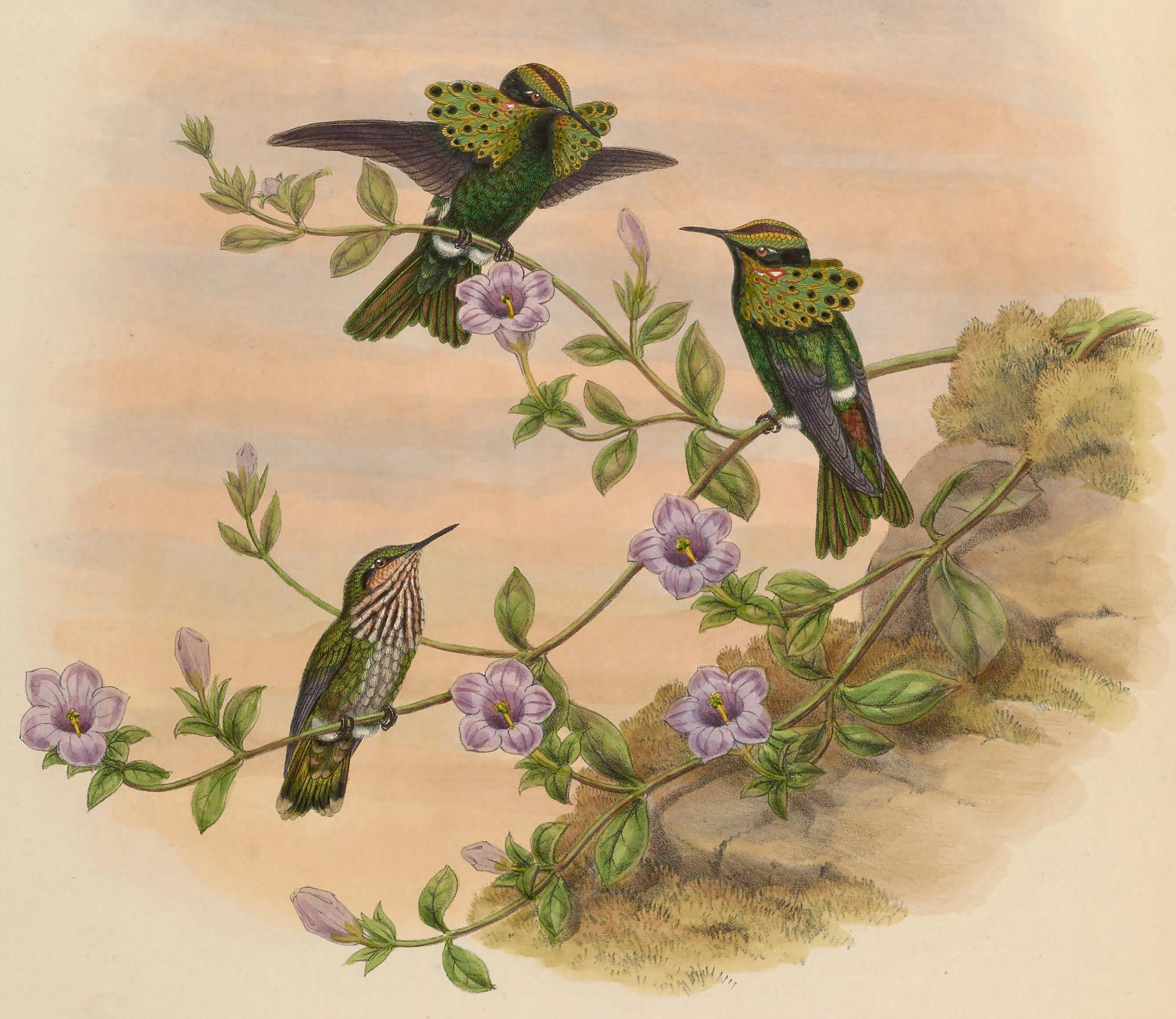

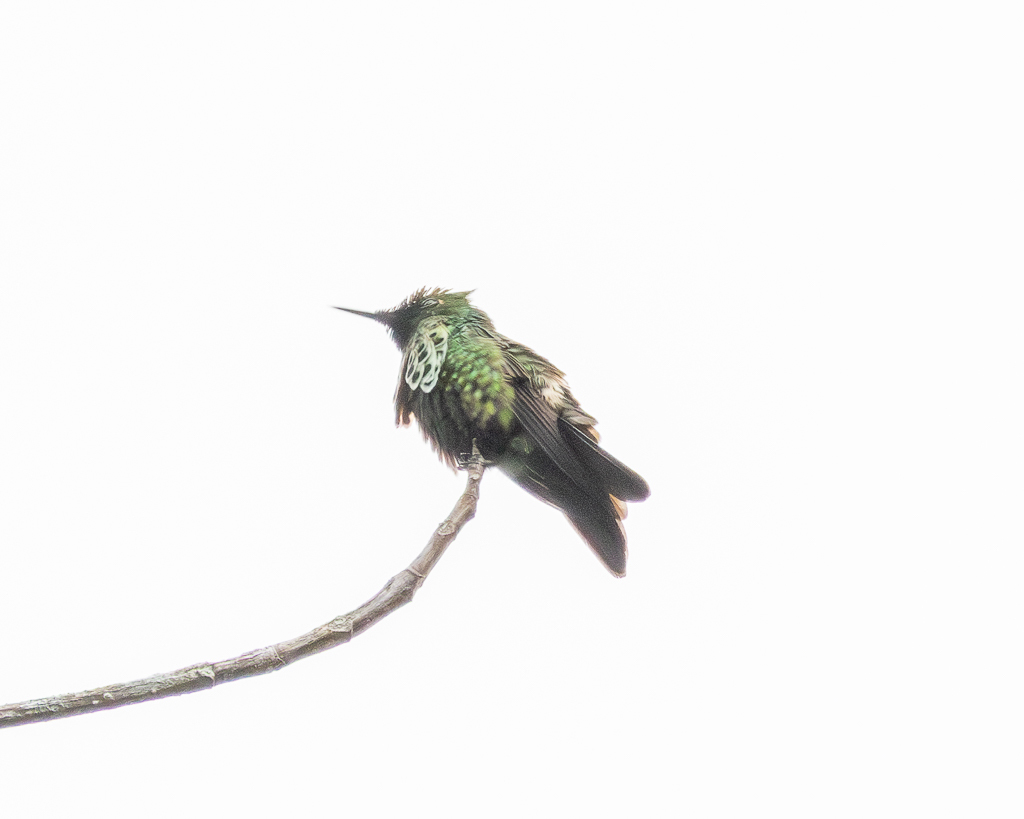

Conservation status
- Least Concern (IUCN 3.1)
- CITES Appendix II

Scientific classification
- Kingdom: Animalia
- Phylum: Chordata
- Class: Aves
- Order: Apodiformes
- Family: Trochilidae
- Genus: Lophornis
- Species: L. pavoninus

Binomial name
- Lophornis pavoninus Salvin & Godman, 1882

= Peacock coquette =

Species of hummingbird

The peacock coquette (Lophornis pavoninus) is a species of hummingbird in the "coquettes", tribe Lesbiini of subfamily Lesbiinae. It is found in Brazil, Guyana, and Venezuela.

== Taxonomy and systematics ==
The peacock coquette and the festive coquette (Lophornis chalybeus) were for a time placed in genus Polemistria. (During that period and after, what is now the butterfly coquette (L. verreauxii) was treated as a subspecies of festive coquette.) The peacock coquette has two subspecies, the nominate L. p. pavoninus and L. p. duidae.

== Description ==
The peacock coquette is about 9.7 cm (3.8 in) long. The male of the nominate subspecies has a glittering golden green head with a black line through its middle. Its upperparts are shiny dark green with a white band across the rump. The tail is purplish bronzy and slightly forked. It has long shiny green cheek tufts with large blackish blue spots at the ends and a rufous patch with a white dot near the eye. Its underparts are grayish green. The female does not have the cheek tufts. Its upperparts are golden bronzy with a buffy white band across the rump. Its tail is grayish; the feathers have a wide purplish bronzy band near the end and the outermost pair have white tips. The throat is white with black streaks and the rest of the underparts are mottled black, white, and green. Subspecies L. p. duidae is similar to the nominate but its black crown line and the rufous patch on the cheek are smaller.

== Distribution and habitat ==
The nominate subspecies of peacock coquette is found on Cerro Ptari-tepui and in Sierra de Lema in southeastern Venezuela's Bolívar state; on Mount Roraima where Venezuela, Brazil, and Guyana meet; and in the Merumé Mountains of Guyana. Subspecies L. p. duidae is found on Cerro Duida and nearby smaller tepuis in southeastern Venezuela's Amazonas state. The species inhabits the interior, clearings, and edges of rainforest and cloud forest at elevations between 500 and 2,000 m (1,600 and 6,600 ft).

== Behavior ==
=== Movement ===
The peacock coquette is thought to be mainly sedentary but appears to make migratory or nomadic movements in Sierra de Lema.

=== Feeding ===
The peacock coquette forages for nectar in the forest canopy, usually alone but sometimes in small groups. Its diet also includes small arthropods that it apparently gleans from foliage.

=== Breeding ===
The peacock coquette's nesting season is unknown. The female builds a cup nest suspended from a horizontal branch about 2 m (7 ft) above the ground. The clutch size is two; incubation lasts 13 to 14 days and fledging occurs about 20 days after hatch.

=== Vocalization ===
The peacock coquette's vocalizations have not been described, and as of February 2022 no recordings are available at Xeno-canto or Cornell University's Macaulay Library.

== Status ==
The IUCN has assessed the peacock coquette as being of Least Concern, though its population size and trend are not known. Its habitat atop tepuis is generally intact and little visited by humans, and "so far no immediate threat has been detected."
