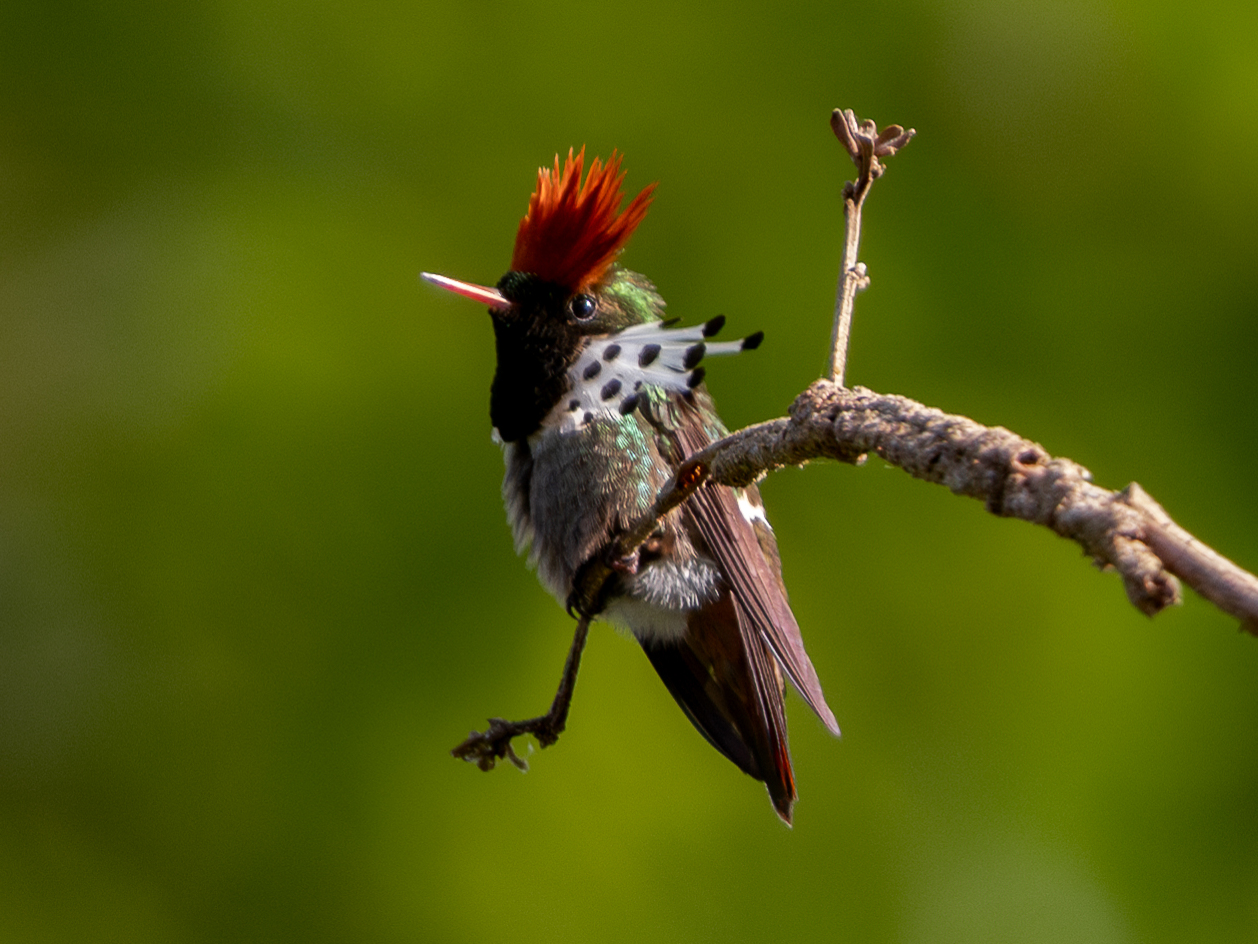
- Lophornis gouldii in Pará, Brazil

Conservation status
- Near Threatened (IUCN 3.1)
- CITES Appendix II (CITES)

Scientific classification
- Kingdom: Animalia
- Phylum: Chordata
- Class: Aves
- Clade: Strisores
- Order: Apodiformes
- Family: Trochilidae
- Genus: Lophornis
- Species: L. gouldii

Binomial name
- Lophornis gouldii (Lesson, RP, 1832)

= Dot-eared coquette =

Species of hummingbird

The dot-eared coquette (Lophornis gouldii) is a species of hummingbird in the "coquettes", tribe Lesbiini of subfamily Lesbiinae. It is found in Bolivia and Brazil.

== Taxonomy and systematics ==
The dot-eared coquette is monotypic.

== Description ==
The dot-eared coquette is 6.8 to 7.6 cm (2.7 to 3.0 in) long and weighs 2.4 to 2.8 g (0.085 to 0.099 oz). Both sexes have a short, straight, black-tipped red bill. The adult male's forehead is glittering golden green. Long dark rufous feathers on its crown form a crest. Its upperparts are bronzy green with a white band across the rump. Its throat is glittering emerald green. Long white feathers with shiny green dots make tufts that fan out and back on the cheeks. Its underparts are grayish green. Its central tail feathers are bronzy green and the rest rufous with bronzy green tips and edges. The adult female does not have the male's crest or cheek tufts. Its upperparts are colored like the male's but with a bronzy iridescence. Its throat is rufous with a grayish green lower border. Its tail is bronze with rufous tips. Juveniles are similar to the adult female.

== Distribution and habitat ==
The dot-eared coquette is found primarily in Brazil, from the mouth of the Amazon River in Pará south and west to Mato Grosso and Goiás. It has been recorded as a vagrant in Bolivia's Santa Cruz department. It inhabits semi-open to open landscapes such as forest edges, savanna, and cerrado from sea level up to about 800 m (2,600 ft) of elevation.

== Behavior ==
=== Movement ===
The dot-eared coquette is believed to be sedentary.

=== Feeding ===
The dot-eared coquette is a "trap-line" feeder, visiting a circuit of flowering plants for nectar. Details of its diet are not known.

=== Breeding ===
The dot-eared coquette's breeding season spans from December to April. Its nest has not been described. The female incubates the clutch of two eggs for about 14 days; fledging is about 22 days after hatch.

=== Vocal and non-vocal sounds ===
The dot-eared coquette is mostly silent. It gives "a short 'tsip'" when feeding. Its wings make "a low bee-like humming" when hovering.

== Status ==
The IUCN originally assessed the dot-eared coquette in 2000 as being of Least Concern. The rating was changed to Vulnerable in 2012 and to Near Threatened in 2021. Its population is estimated at between 28,000 and 376,000 mature individuals. The population is projected to decline as much as 29% by 2031 due to continued deforestation and the planned construction of hydroelectric dams.
