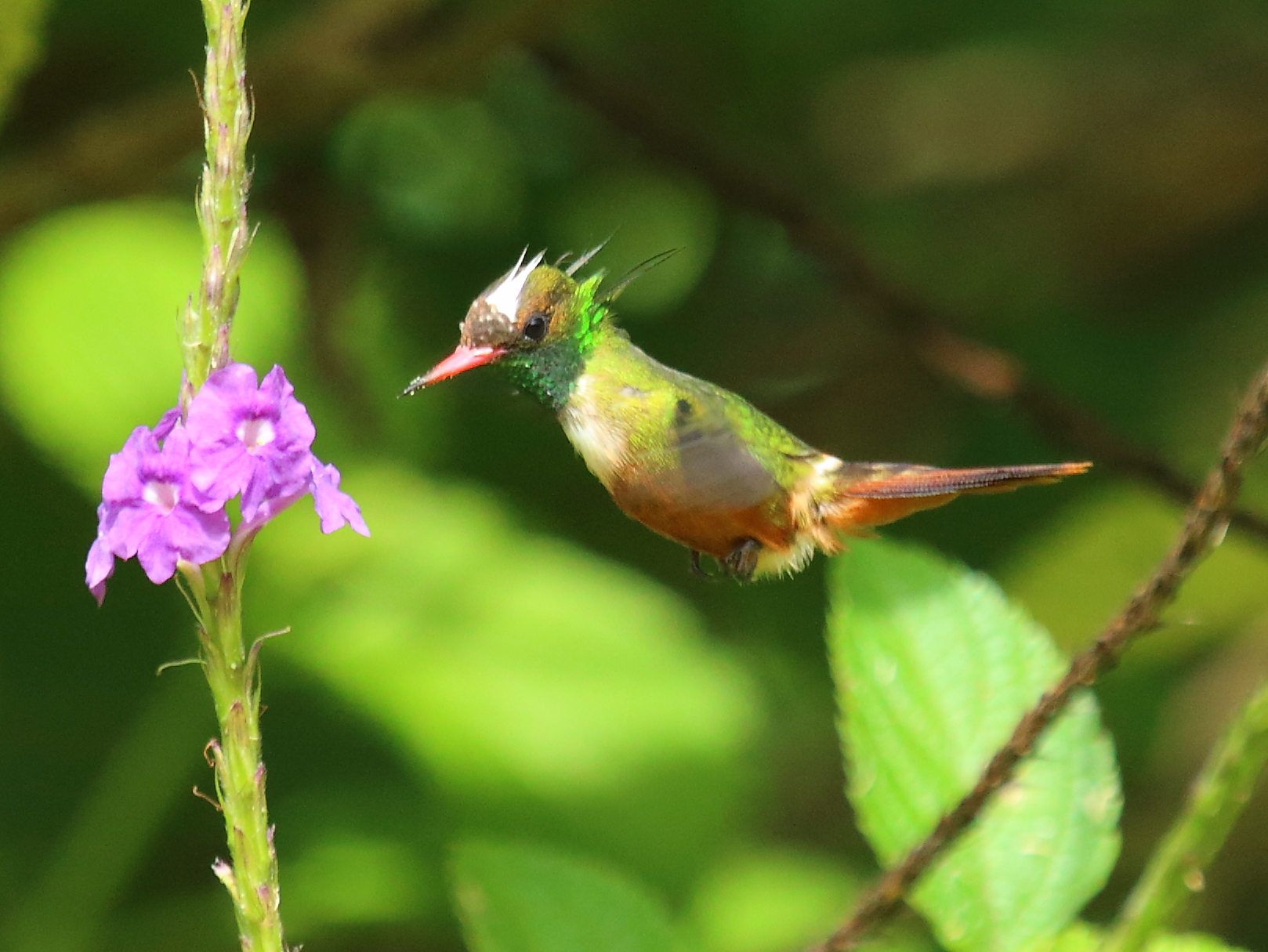

Conservation status
- Least Concern (IUCN 3.1)
- CITES Appendix II

Scientific classification
- Kingdom: Animalia
- Phylum: Chordata
- Class: Aves
- Clade: Strisores
- Order: Apodiformes
- Family: Trochilidae
- Genus: Lophornis
- Species: L. adorabilis

Binomial name
- Lophornis adorabilis Salvin, 1870

= White-crested coquette =

Species of hummingbird

The white-crested coquette (Lophornis adorabilis) is a species of hummingbird in the "coquettes", tribe Lesbiini of subfamily Lesbiinae. It is found in Costa Rica and Panama.

== Taxonomy and systematics ==
At one time the white-crested coquette and the black-crested coquette (Lophornis helenae) were placed in genus Paphosia. The white-crested coquette is monotypic.

== Description ==
The white-crested coquette is about 7 cm (2.8 in) long and weighs about 2.7 g (0.095 oz). The adult male has a coppery bronze forecrown and lores, and the crown has an erect white crest. The nape and back are bronzy green; a white band separates the back from the purplish bronze rump and uppertail coverts. The tail is chestnut-rufous and the feathers have bronze edges. The throat and cheeks are glittering green and the latter have long wispy tufts. A white band separates the throat from the cinnamon-rufous breast, belly, and undertail coverts. Its bill is red with a black tip.

The adult female is generally duller than the male and lacks the crest and cheek tufts. Its face and forecrown are dusky bronze and the throat and chest white with bronzy green speckles. The tail is chestnut-rufous with a black band near the end. Its maxilla is black and the mandible red with a dark tip.

Immature males resemble the adult female but with a heavily green-flecked throat. Immature females resemble the adults with a less distinct band on the tail.

== Distribution and habitat ==
The white-crested coquette is found on the Pacific side of southern Costa Rica and inland somewhat to the Cordillera Central, and on the Pacific slope of far western Panama. It inhabits the interior and edges of humid forests and taller secondary forest; it also occurs in more open landscapes like along hedgerows. In elevation it ranges from sea level to over 1,200 m (3,900 ft).

== Behavior ==
=== Movement ===
The white-crested coquette appears to be somewhat nomadic, spending time in areas with many blooming trees and then disappearing.

=== Feeding ===
The white-crested coquette feeds on nectar, which is mostly sought in the canopy but also at lower levels at forest edges and gardens. It hovers to feed on nectar and on small arthropods that it gleans from foliage.

=== Breeding ===
The white-crested coquette breeds early in the dry season, between December and February. Males court with a side-to-side arcing flight facing a perched or hovering female. Females build a cup nest of plant down and cobweb covered with lichen and suspended from a branch. The site is often exposed and nests have been seen as high as 18 m (59 ft) above the ground. The clutch size is two eggs; fledging occurs 21 to 22 days after hatch.

=== Vocalization ===
The white-crested coquette makes a "[s]oft liquid tseping when feeding."

== Status ==
The IUCN has assessed the white-crested coquette as being of Least Concern. Its population is estimated to be at least 20,000 mature individuals but decreasing. "[D]eforestation and reduction of the habitat is the main concern for these and many other species".
