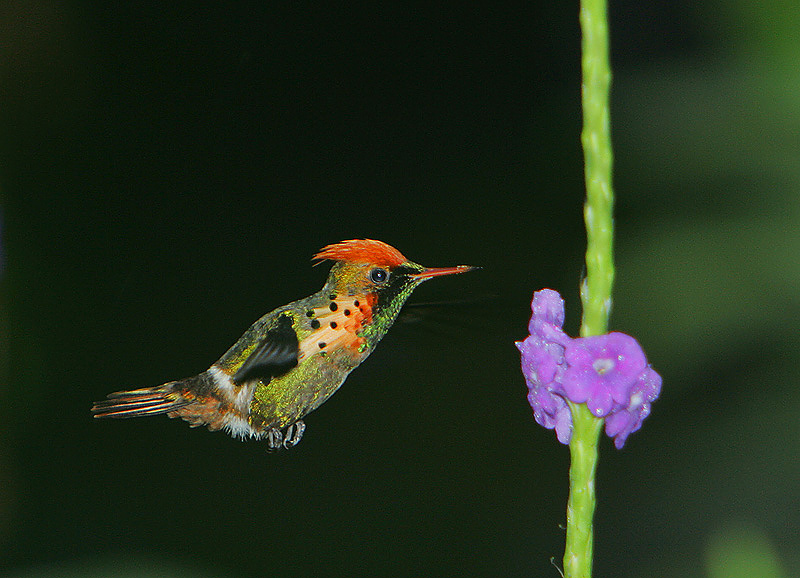
- Adult male, Asa Wright Nature Centre, Trinidad

Conservation status
- Least Concern (IUCN 3.1)
- CITES Appendix II

Scientific classification
- Kingdom: Animalia
- Phylum: Chordata
- Class: Aves
- Order: Apodiformes
- Family: Trochilidae
- Genus: Lophornis
- Species: L. ornatus

Binomial name
- Lophornis ornatus (Boddaert, 1783)

= Tufted coquette =

Species of bird

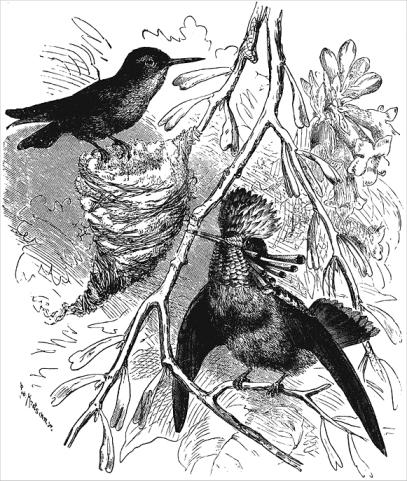
Figure 48 from The Descent of Man, and Selection in Relation to Sex by Charles Darwin

The tufted coquette (Lophornis ornatus) is a tiny hummingbird that breeds in eastern Venezuela, Trinidad, Guiana, and northern Brazil. It is an uncommon but widespread species, and appears to be a local or seasonal migrant, although its movements are not well understood.

This small bird inhabits open country, gardens, and cultivated areas.

== Taxonomy ==
The tufted coquette was described by the French polymath Georges-Louis Leclerc, Comte de Buffon in 1781 in his Histoire Naturelle des Oiseaux. The bird was also illustrated in a hand-coloured plate engraved by François-Nicolas Martinet in the Planches Enluminées D'Histoire Naturelle which was produced under the supervision of Edme-Louis Daubenton to accompany Buffon's text. Neither the plate caption nor Buffon's description included a scientific name but in 1783 the Dutch naturalist Pieter Boddaert coined the binomial name Trochilus ornatus in his catalogue of the Planches Enluminées. The type locality is Cayenne in French Guiana. The tufted coquette is now placed in the genus Lophornis that was introduced by the French naturalist René Lesson in 1829. The species is monotypic. The generic name combines the Ancient Greek lophos meaning "crest" or "tuft" with ornis meaning "bird". The specific epithet ornatus is Latin for "ornate" or "adorned".

== Description ==
The tufted coquette is 6.6 centimetres (2.6 in) long and weighs 2.3 grams (0.081 oz). The black-tipped red bill is short and straight. The male has a rufous head crest and a coppery green back with a whitish rump band that is prominent in flight. The forehead and underparts are green, and black-spotted rufous plumes project from the neck sides. The tail is golden rufous. The female lacks the crest and plumes. She has green upperparts (dorsal), except for the whitish tail band, and rufous underparts (ventral) that become much paler on the belly. The tail is mostly bronze green with a dusky band and whitish tips to the feathers. Immature males resemble the female, but their throats are whitish with fine dark spotting.

The female tufted coquette lays two eggs in a small cup nest made of plant down and placed on a branch.

Tufted coquettes are tame and approachable. The call of this species while feeding is a light chik.

Their food is nectar, taken from a variety of flowers, and some small invertebrates. With their small size and steady flight, these birds often resemble a large bee as it moves from flower to flower.
