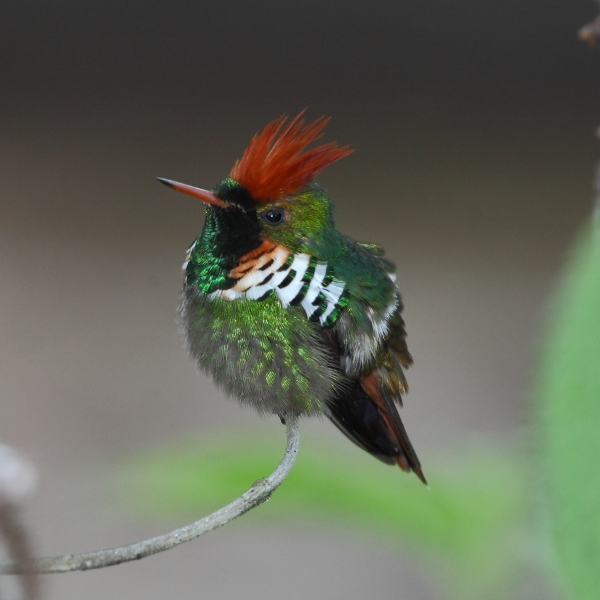
- A frilled coquette male at Itatiaia National Park, Rio de Janeiro state, Brazil
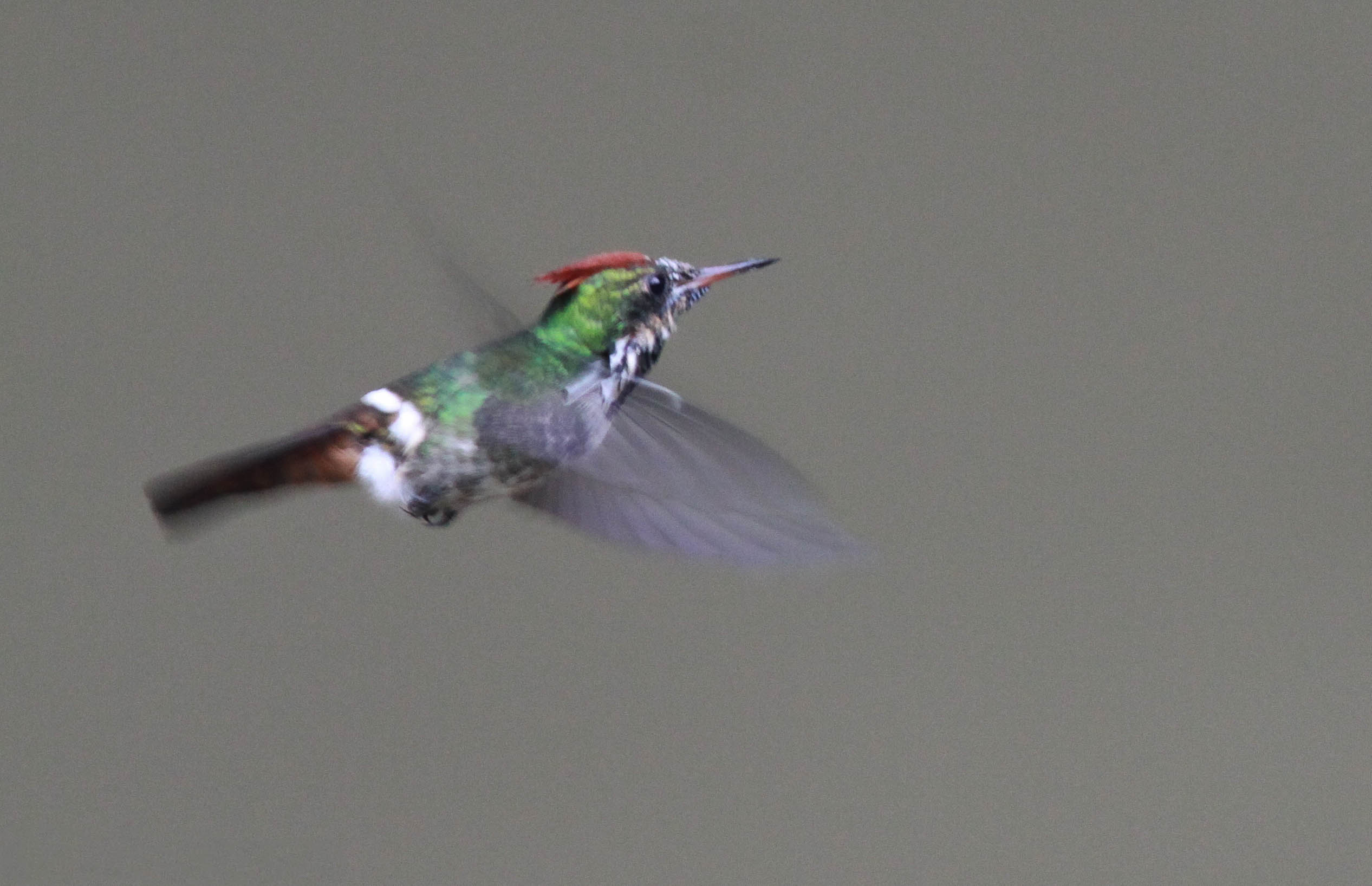
- Lophornis magnificus caught in flight

Conservation status
- Least Concern (IUCN 3.1)
- CITES Appendix II

Scientific classification
- Kingdom: Animalia
- Phylum: Chordata
- Class: Aves
- Order: Apodiformes
- Family: Trochilidae
- Genus: Lophornis
- Species: L. magnificus

Binomial name
- Lophornis magnificus (Vieillot, 1817)

= Frilled coquette =

Species of hummingbird

The frilled coquette (Lophornis magnificus) is a species of hummingbird in the "coquettes", tribe Lesbiini of subfamily Lesbiinae. It is endemic to Brazil.

== Taxonomy and systematics ==
The frilled coquette's genus name derives from the Greek words "lophos λοφος"meaning "crest, tuft, forelock" and "ornis ορνις", " meaning bird. The species name "magnificus" is the Latin word for "magnificent, splendid".

The frilled coquette is monotypic.

== Description ==
The frilled coquette is one of the smallest birds alive. It is 7.1 to 7.7 cm (2.8 to 3.0 in) long and weighs an average of 2.66 g (0.094 oz). Both sexes have a short, straight, black-tipped red bill and bronzy green upperparts with a white band across the rump. Adult males of this striking bird have a long, rufous-orange erectile crest and green and white fan-shaped cheek feathers. Its forehead and throat are iridescent green and the rest of the underparts grayish green. Its central tail feathers are bronzy green and the rest rufous with bronzy green tips and edges. The adult female does not have the male's crest or cheek tufts. It has a whitish throat with rufous discs and dark crescents. It underparts are grayish green like the male's, but the tail is overall dark bronze with rufous ends. Juveniles are similar to the adult female.

== Distribution and habitat ==
The frilled coquette is found in eastern and southern Brazil, from Espírito Santo south to Rio Grande do Sul and west almost to Bolivia and Paraguay. It has occasionally been recorded as far north as Alagoas. It inhabits semi-open to open landscapes such as the edges of humid forest, secondary forest, coffee plantations, gardens, and cerrado. In elevation it ranges from sea level to 1,000 m (3,300 ft).

== Behavior ==
=== Movement ===
The frilled coquette makes some seasonal dispersal, apparently after the flowering and nesting season.

=== Feeding ===
The frilled coquette feeds on small arthropods and on the nectar of a wide variety of small flowering plants. It catches insects by hawking from a perch 2 to 5 m (7 to 20 ft) above the ground. It defers to larger hummingbirds.

=== Breeding ===
The frilled coquette's breeding season spans from August to March. The female makes a cup-shaped nest of plant down and moss decorated with lichens on the outside. It typically places it like a saddle on a branch of a bush or small tree 2 to 5 m (7 to 20 ft) above the ground. The female incubates the clutch of two white eggs; incubation lasts 12 to 13 days and fledging occurs about 20 days after hatch.

=== Vocal and non-vocal sounds ===
The frilled coquette is mostly silent. It gives "a short 'tsip'" while feeding. Its wings make "a low bee-like humming" when hovering.

== Status ==
The IUCN has assessed the frilled coquette as being of Least Concern, though its population size and trend are not known. It is regarded as common and "[r]eadily accepts man-made habitats like plantations and flowering gardens". It occurs in several protected areas.

== Gallery ==
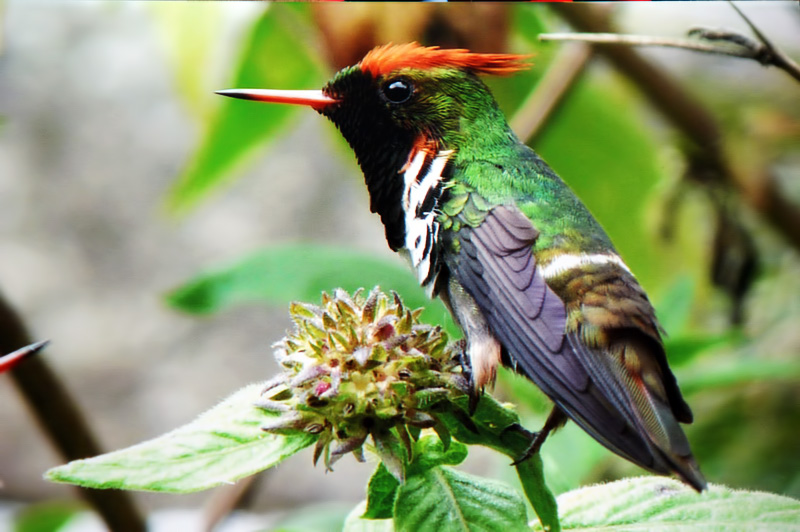
A perched male Lophornis magnificus

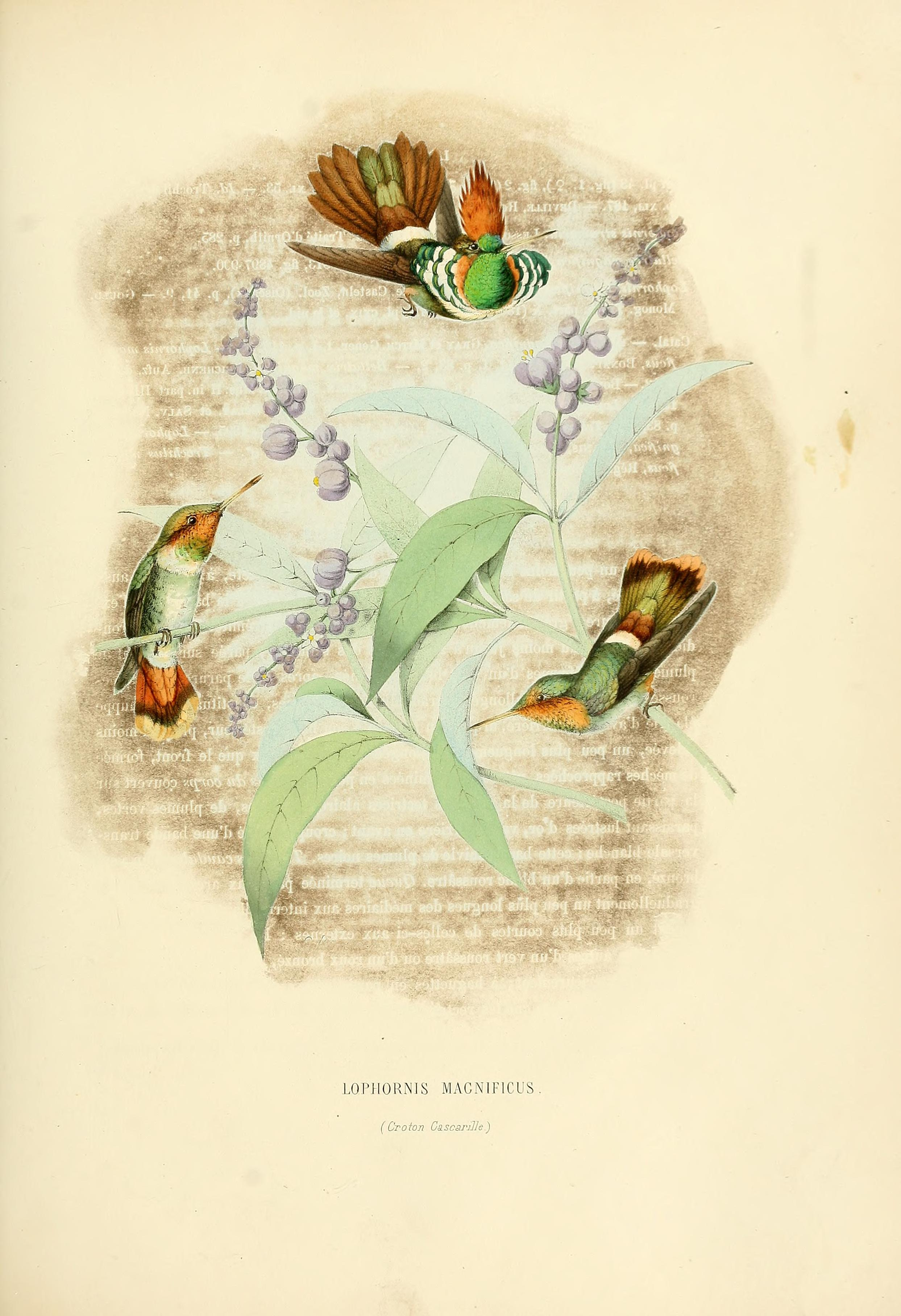
Illustration from Histoire naturelle des oiseaux-mouches (1861)

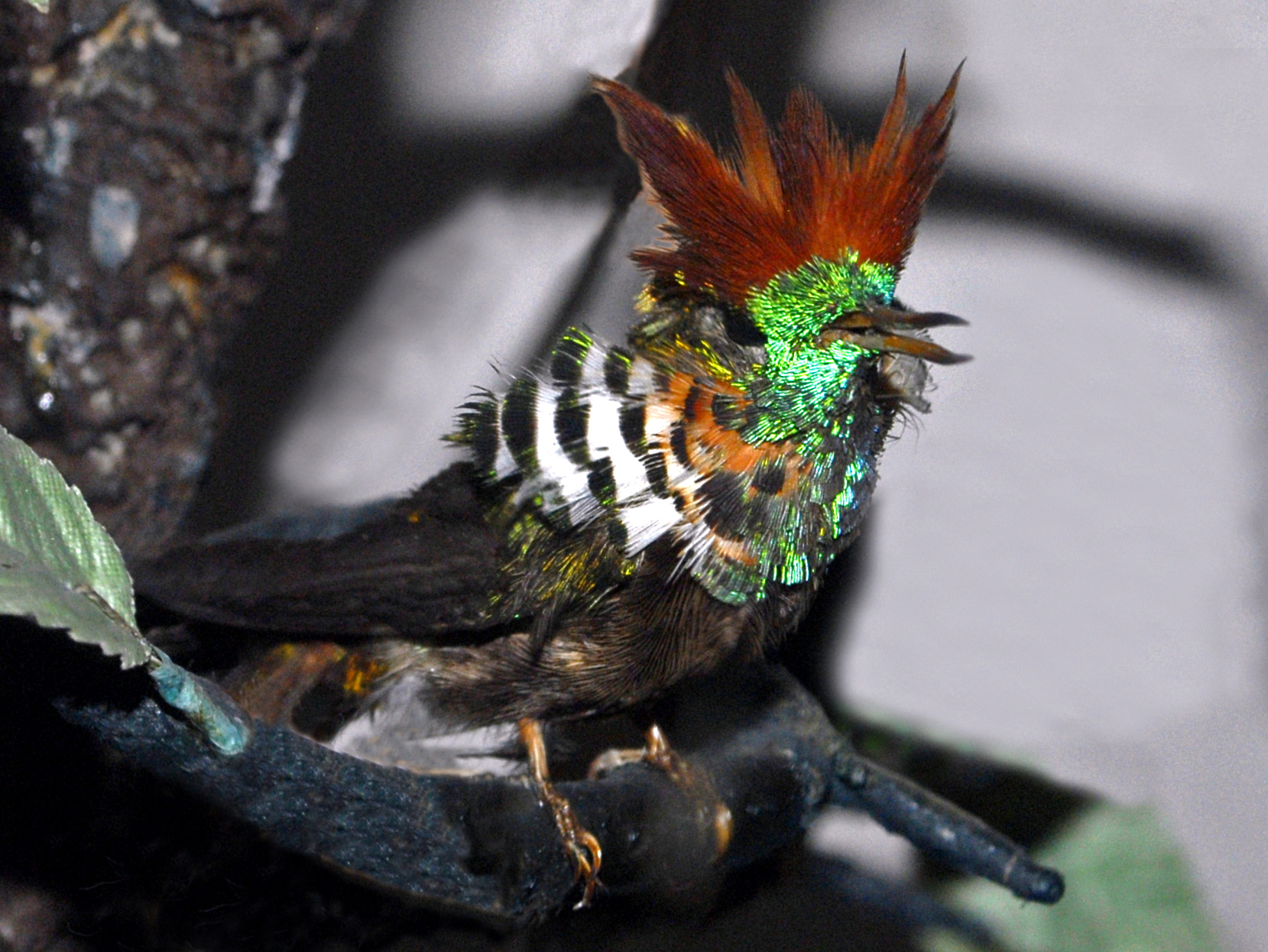
Museum specimen of Lophornis magnificus

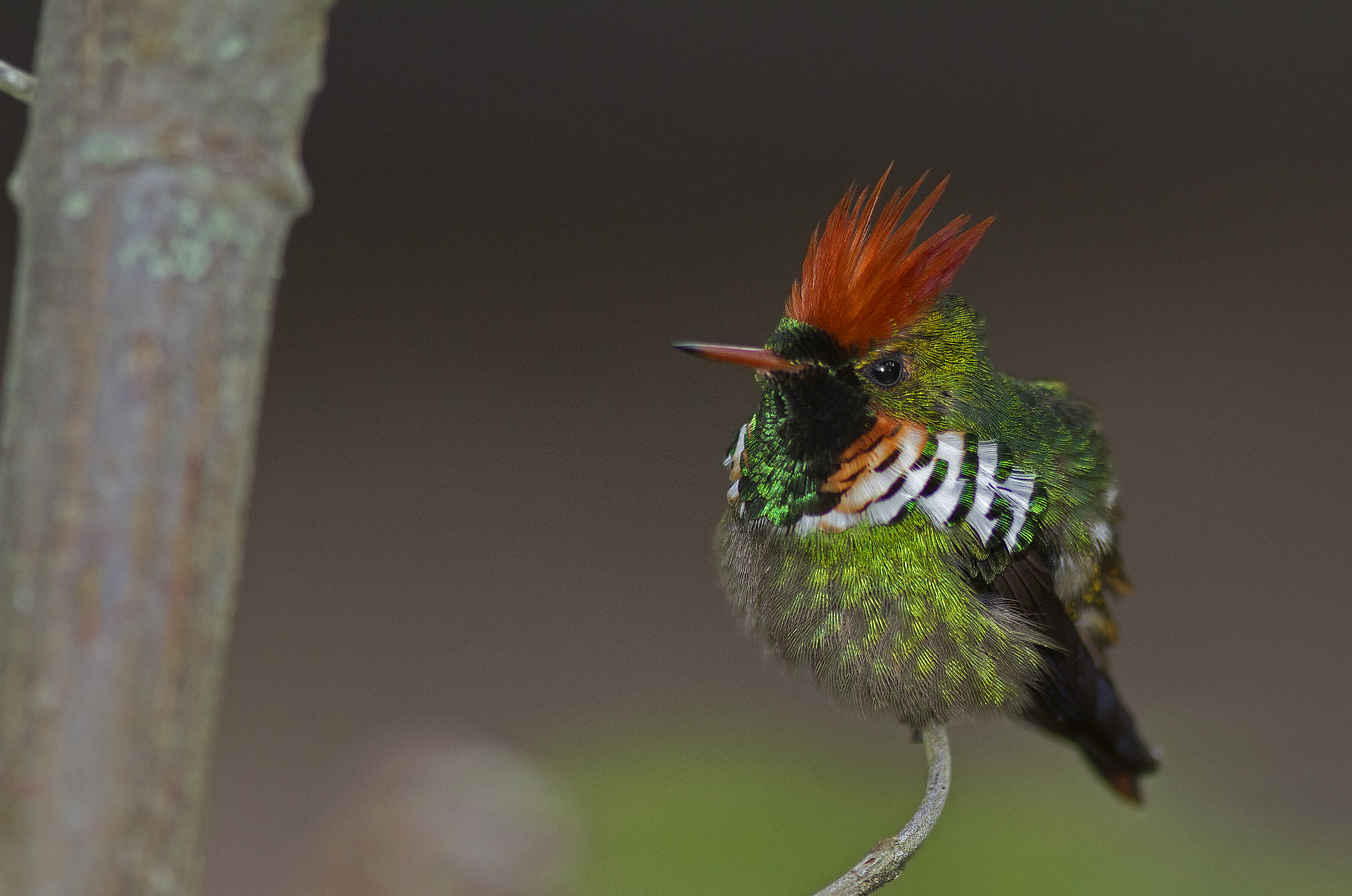
Parque Nacional do Itatiaia Reinaldo de Medeiros
