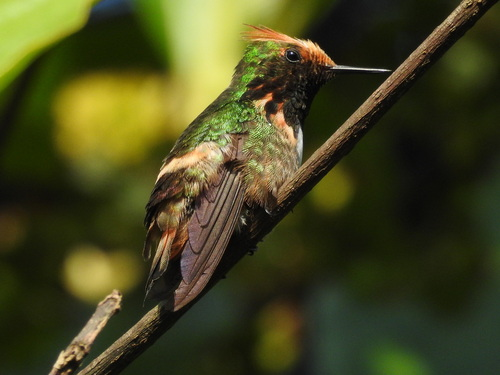
- male

Conservation status
- Critically Endangered (IUCN 3.1)
- CITES Appendix II (CITES)

Scientific classification
- Kingdom: Animalia
- Phylum: Chordata
- Class: Aves
- Clade: Strisores
- Order: Apodiformes
- Family: Trochilidae
- Genus: Lophornis
- Species: L. brachylophus

Binomial name
- Lophornis brachylophus R. T. Moore, 1949
- Range of L. brachylophus

= Short-crested coquette =

Species of hummingbird

The short-crested coquette (Lophornis brachylophus) is a Critically Endangered species of hummingbird in the "coquettes", tribe Lesbiini of subfamily Lesbiinae. It is endemic to a small area of Mexico.

== Taxonomy and systematics ==
The short-crested coquette is monotypic. At times it has been treated as conspecific with the rufous-crested coquette (L. delattrei).

== Description ==
The short-crested coquette is 7 to 7.5 cm (2.8 to 3.0 in) long. Both sexes have a short, straight, black bill. The adult male has a short rufous erectile crest; its longest feathers have green tips. It has emerald green upperparts with a white band between the back and the bronzy purple lower rump and green uppertail coverts. The throat is iridescent emerald green and the face features short orange cheek tufts tipped green. A white band separates the throat from the rest of the underparts, which are pale cinnamon. The central tail feathers are green and the rest reddish cinnamon with black tips. The adult female lacks the male's crest and cheek patches. Its forehead is dull cinnamon. Its upperparts are pale green; a buffy to whitish band separates the back from the dull green rump. The throat is whitish with a white band below it and the rest of the underparts are pale cinnamon. The central tail feathers are green with blackish tips and the rest cinnamon with a black bar near the end and pale buff tips. Immatures resemble the adult female.

== Distribution and habitat ==
The short-crested coquette is found only in Mexico, in the extremely restricted range of a 25 km (16 mi) stretch of the Atoyac-Paraíso-Puerto del Gallo road in the Sierra Madre del Sur mountains of Guerrero, Mexico, north-west of Acapulco. It inhabits semi-deciduous and humid evergreen forest, pine-oak forest, and plantations. In elevation it ranges between 900 and 1,800 m (3,000 and 5,900 ft).

== Behavior ==
=== Movement ===
The short-crested coquette is believed to be sedentary but some altitudinal movement is probable.

=== Feeding ===
The short-crested coquette feeds on small arthropods and on the nectar of a variety of small flowering plants. It catches insects by hawking from a perch. It defers to larger hummingbirds.

=== Breeding ===
The short-crested coquette's breeding season is probably from November to February, but nothing else is known about its breeding phenology.

=== Vocal and non-vocal sounds ===
The short-crested coquette is mostly silent. It gives a "high, sharp 'sip' or 'tsip'" while feeding and also "quiet dry chips 'chi..chi-chi..'." Its wings make "a low bee-like humming" when hovering. Few recordings of its vocalization have been published.

== Status ==
The IUCN initially in 1994 assessed the short-crested coquette as Endangered but since 2000 has rated it Critically Endangered. It has a very small known range and a population estimated to be between 250 and 1000 mature individuals. The species is threatened by continuing habitat loss caused by land clearing for agriculture including illegal narcotic crops. Until 2023 none of its range was protected. Four conservation reserves were created that year by collaboration among local communities, the American Bird Conservancy, the Autonomous University of Guerrero, and the Mexican government. Two others were planned for 2024 openings. The six total approximately 8,900 ha (34 sq mi) and are administered by the local communities.
