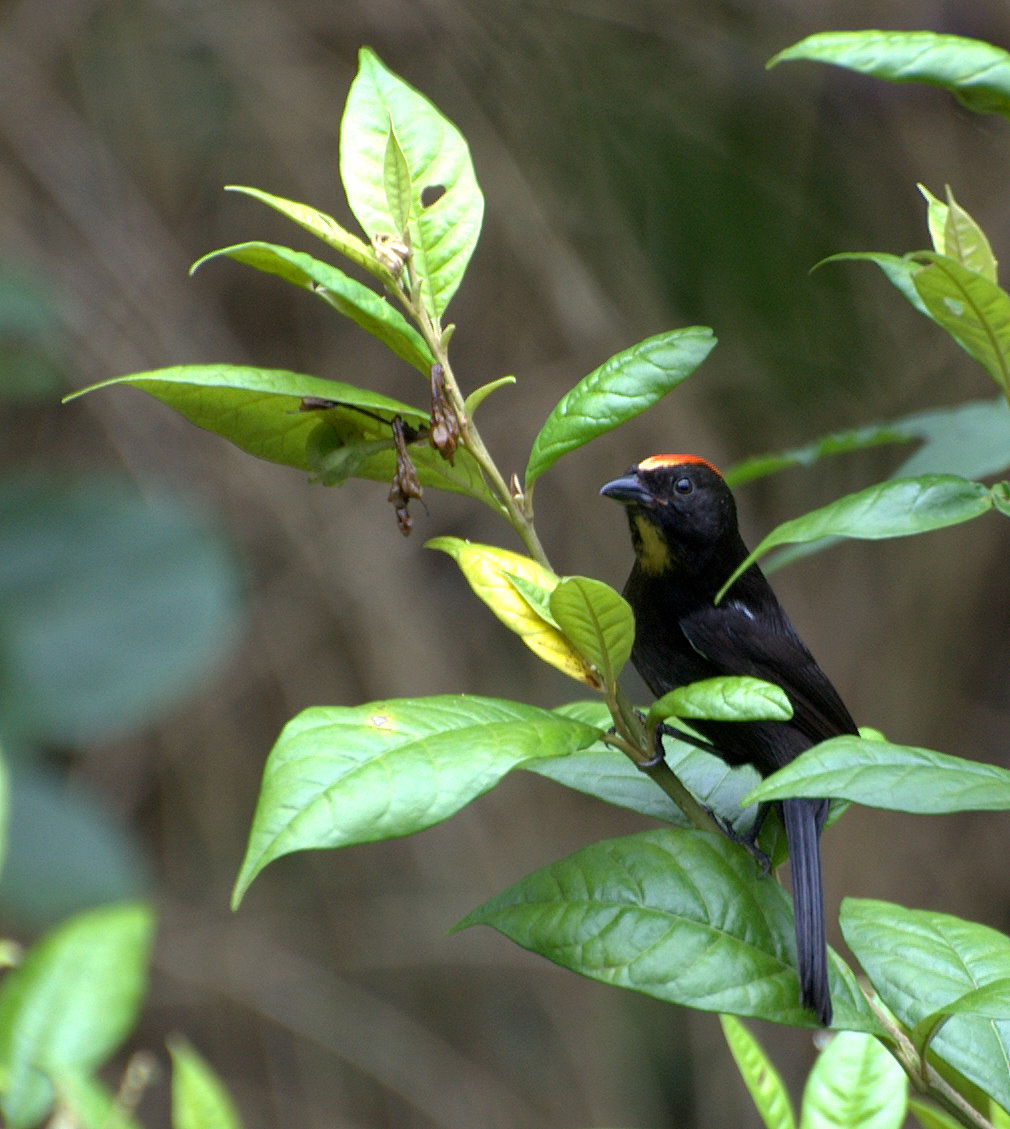
- Male in southeastern Brazil
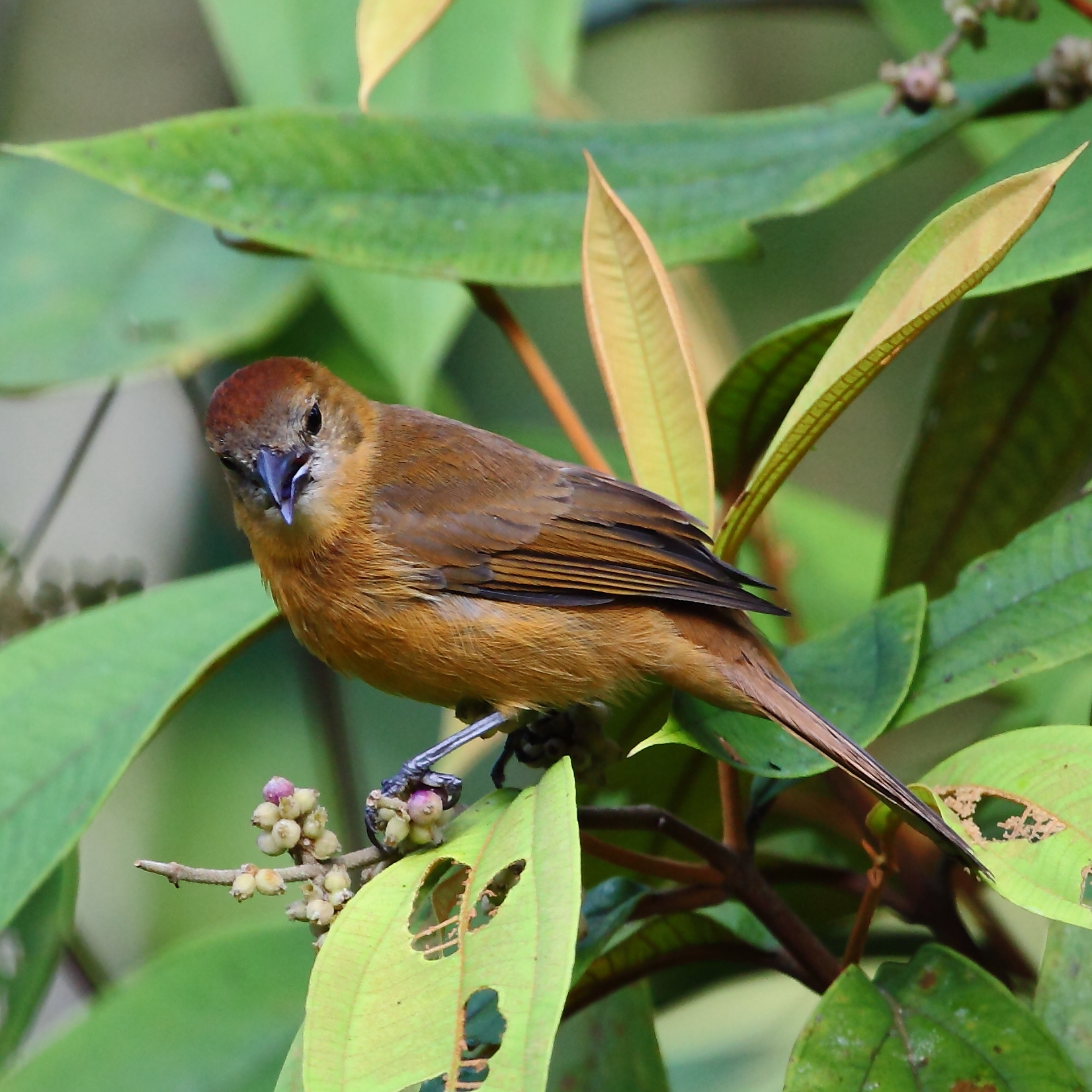
- Female at Restinga de Bertioga State Park, in São Paulo state, Brazil.

Conservation status
- Least Concern (IUCN 3.1)

Scientific classification
- Kingdom: Animalia
- Phylum: Chordata
- Class: Aves
- Order: Passeriformes
- Family: Thraupidae
- Genus: Loriotus
- Species: L. cristatus

Binomial name
- Loriotus cristatus (Linnaeus, 1766)

Synonyms
- Tanagra cristata Linnaeus, 1766; Tachyphonus nattereri Pelzeln, 1870

= Flame-crested tanager =

Species of bird

The flame-crested tanager (Loriotus cristatus) is a species of bird in the family Thraupidae, the tanagers and allies. It is found in every mainland South American country except Argentina, Chile, Paraguay, and Uruguay.

== Taxonomy and systematics ==
In 1760 the French zoologist Mathurin Jacques Brisson included a description of the flame-crested tanager in the supplement to his Ornithologie based on a specimen collected in Cayenne, which was the contemporary name for French Guiana. He used the French name Le tangara noir hupé de Cayenne and the Latin name Tangara cayanensis nigra cristata. Although Brisson coined Latin names, these do not conform to the binomial system and are not recognized by the International Commission on Zoological Nomenclature. When in 1766 the Swedish naturalist Carl Linnaeus updated his Systema Naturae for the twelfth edition he added 240 species that had been previously described by Brisson in his Ornithologie. One of these was the flame-crested tanager. Linnaeus included a terse description, coined the binomial name Tanagra cristata, and cited Brisson's work.

The flame-crested tanager's further taxonomy is complicated. In 1869, August von Pelzeln assigned it to the genus Tachyphonus. A molecular phylogenetic study published in 2014 found that Tachyphonus was polyphyletic. In the subsequent reorganization the genus Loriotus was resurrected for the flame-crested tanager and two other species. The genus had been introduced in 1821 by the Polish zoologist Feliks Paweł Jarocki. The genus name is derived from the French word loriot that is used for the Old World orioles. The specific epithet cristata is Latin for "plumed" or "crested".

The IOC, AviList, the Clements taxonomy, and the South American Classification Committee have adopted the new genus. However, in 2016 BirdLife International's Handbook of the Birds of the World (HBW) instead assigned the flame-crested tanager and the other two species to the genus Islerothraupis and retains them there as of late 2025.

The IOC and AviList recognize these nine subspecies:

- L. c. cristatus (Linnaeus, 1766)
- L. c. intercedens (Berlepsch, 1880)
- L. c. orinocensis (Zimmer, JT & Phelps, WH, 1945)
- L. c. cristatellus (Sclater, PL, 1862)
- L. c. fallax (Zimmer, JT, 1945)
- L. c. huarandosae (Chapman, 1925)
- L. c. madeirae (Hellmayr, 1910)
- L. c. pallidigula (Zimmer, JT, 1945)
- L. c. brunneus (Spix, 1825)

The Clements taxonomy does not recognize L. c. orinocensis, instead including it within L. c. cristatellus. HBW recognizes all nine but adds a tenth, I. c. nattereri. However, a 2017 paper presented strong evidence that the putative taxon nattereri, known from only two nineteenth century specimens, is a hybrid between the flame-crested tanager and the white-shouldered tanager (L. luctuosus).

This article follows the IOC/AviList nine-subspecies model.

== Description ==
The flame-crested tanager is about 15 cm (5.9 in) long and weighs 16.5 to 23.0 g (0.58 to 0.81 oz). The species is sexually dimorphic. Adult males of the nominate subspecies L. c. cristatus have the eponymous scarlet or orange crest with a thin buff band below its front and sides. They are otherwise mostly black. They have a fulvous or yellowish buff rump, white lesser wing coverts and underwing coverts, and a thin yellowish buff streak in the middle of the throat. Adult females have a rufescent brown crown and a grayish face. Their upperparts are rufescent brown that is richest on the lower back and tail. Their throat is buffy gray to whitish and their underparts bright ochraceous buff. Juveniles are similar to adult females.

The other subspecies of the flame-crested tanager differ from the nominate and each other thus:

- L. c. intercedens: orange-yellow crest; female has more olivaceous upperparts
- L. c. cristatellus: scarlet crest and duller chin and throat
- L. c. orinocensis: much like cristatellus
- L. c. fallax: orange crest with smaller buff band
- L. c. huarandosae: longer crest and smaller rump and throat patches
- L. c. madeirae: shorter scarlet crest with no buff and deeper ochraceous throat patch
- L. c. pallidigula: short deep red crest and light ochraceous rump and throat patches
- L. c. brunneus: long medium red crest and more white on wing coverts

Both sexes of all subspecies have a dark brown iris and a black maxilla. Males have a black mandible with a silvery gray base and black legs. Females have an all-gray mandible and gray legs.

== Distribution and habitat ==
The flame-crested tanager has a disjunct distribution; L. c. brunneus is separate from the other subspecies. The subspecies are found thus:

- L. c. cristatus: French Guiana and north of the Amazon River in far northeastern Brazil's Amapá and northeastern Pará states
- L. c. intercedens: from Venezuela's eastern Bolívar state east through Guyana and Suriname
- L. c. orinocensis: from Colombia east of Meta Department into southern Venezuela's Amazonas and most of Bolívar states
- L. c. cristatellus: from central Colombia's Meta and Vichada departments southeast into northwestern Brazil and northeastern Peru
- L. c. fallax: from Colombia south of Meta and Vichada departments south through eastern Ecuador into northern Peru's lower Ucayali River valley on an approximate line from far northern Cajamarca Department east to east-central Loreto Department
- L. c. huarandosae: Huarandosa vicinity in northern Peru's Chinchipe River valley in Cajamarca
- L. c. madeirae: Brazil south of the Amazon from central Amazonas east to the Xingu River and south to Mato Grosso, Peru's eastern Madre de Dios Department, and northern Bolivia's Pando and northern Beni departments
- L. c. pallidigula: Brazil south of the Amazon east of the Xingu to the Atlantic in Maranhão
- L. c. brunneus: eastern Brazil from Paraíba south to Santa Catarina

In its large contiguous range the flame-crested tanager primarily inhabits tropical evergreen forest. In the Amazon Basin it favors terra firme forest and in Brazil also is found in várzea forest. The eastern Brazilian population inhabits more open landscapes including woodlands, clearings edges of extensive forest, forested savanna, and secondary forest. In elevation it reaches 1,400 m (4,600 ft) in Venezuela, 700 m (2,300 ft) in Colombia, 900 m (3,000 ft) in Peru, and 800 m (2,600 ft) in Brazil. In Ecuador it is found mostly below 600 m (2,000 ft) but locally ranges higher.

== Behavior ==
=== Movement ===
The flame-crested tanager is a year-round resident.

=== Feeding ===
The flame-crested tanager feeds on insects and lesser amounts of fruits and seeds. It forages from the forest's mid-level to its canopy, energetically gleaning prey from foliage. It is usually in pairs but sometimes in groups of up to 10 individuals and almost always is part of a mixed-species feeding flock.

=== Breeding ===
The flame-crested tanager's breeding season is almost unknown but includes January in Colombia. The species' nest is a small open cup placed in small trees or palms and typically on the bank of a stream or pond. Its eggs are white or yellow-pink with red spots. Nothing else is known about the species' breeding biology.

=== Vocalization ===
One description of the flame-crested tanager's song is an "very/[extremely] high see-see-see-turrr-tirr series" and its call is described as an "[extremely] high tee-tee-tee or see-see".

== Status ==
The IUCN has assessed the flame-crested tanager as being of Least Concern. It has an extremely large range; its population size is not known but is believed to be stable. No immediate threats have been identified. It is considered "fairly common to common" in Venezuela, "fairly common" in Colombia and Peru, and "common to frequent" in both of its Brazilian ranges.
