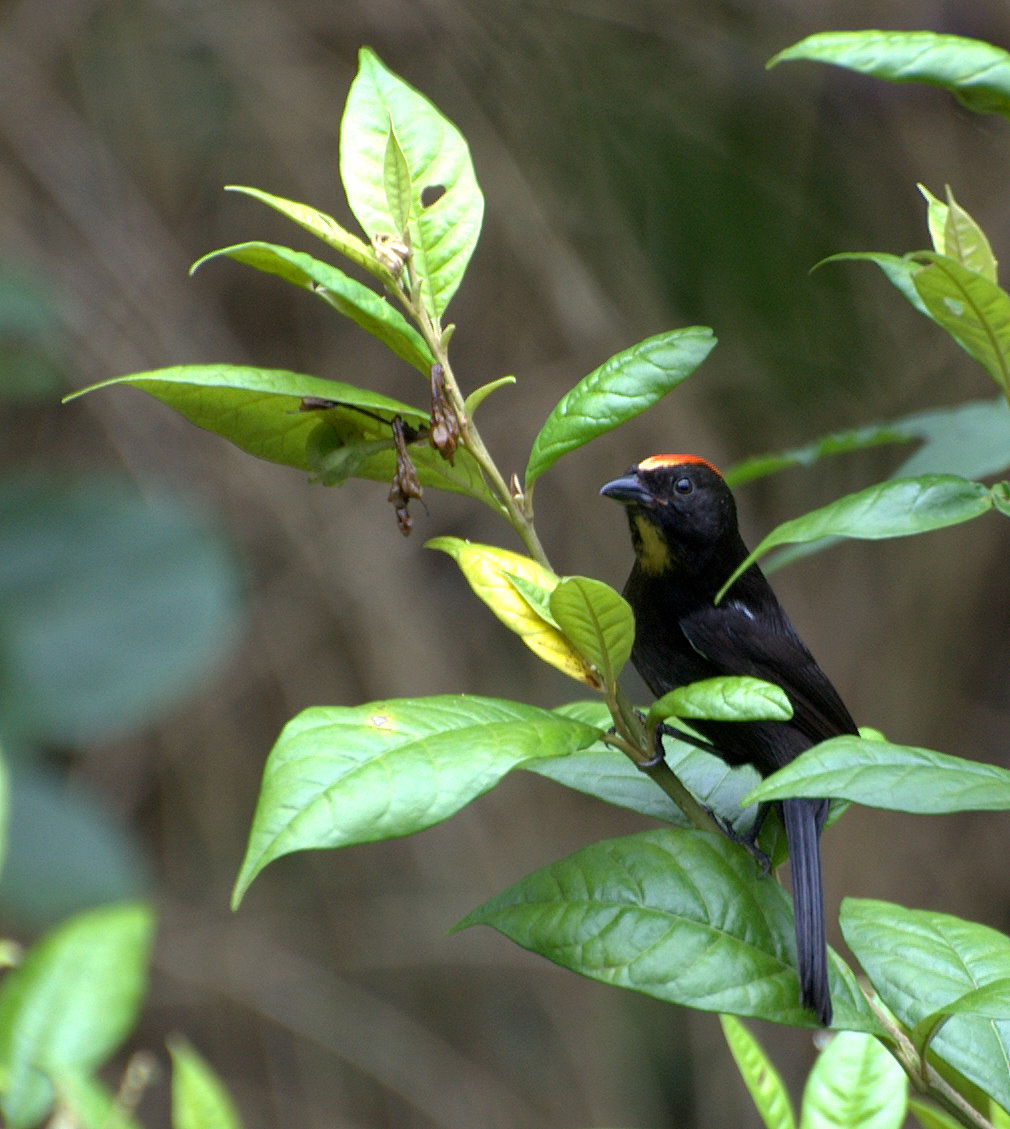
- Flame-crested tanager male

Scientific classification
- Kingdom: Animalia
- Phylum: Chordata
- Class: Aves
- Order: Passeriformes
- Family: Thraupidae
- Genus: Loriotus; Jarocki, 1821

Type species
- Tanagra cristata Linnaeus, 1766

Species
- 3, see list

= Loriotus =

Genus of birds

Loriotus is a genus of birds in the tanager family Thraupidae. The species now placed in this genus were formerly placed in the genus Tachyphonus.

== Taxonomy and species list ==
The three species now assigned to Loriotus were traditionally placed in the genus Tachyphonus. A molecular phylogenetic study published in 2014 found that Tachyphonus was polyphyletic. In the subsequent reorganization the genus Loriotus was resurrected for these three species. The genus had been introduced in 1821 by the Polish zoologist Feliks Paweł Jarocki with the flame-crested tanager as the type species. The name is derived from the French word loriot that is used for the Old World orioles.

The three species in the genus are:

Genus Loriotus – Linnaeus, 1766 – three species
| Common name | Scientific name and subspecies | Range | Size and ecology | IUCN status and estimated population |
|---|---|---|---|---|
| Flame-crested tanager Male Female | Loriotus cristatus (Linnaeus, 1766) Nine subspecies: L. c. cristatus (Linnaeus, 1766); L. c. intercedens (Berlepsch, 1880); L. c. orinocensis (Zimmer, JT & Phelps, WH, 1945); L. c. cristatellus (Sclater, PL, 1862); L. c. fallax (Zimmer, JT, 1945); L. c. huarandosae (Chapman, 1925); L. c. madeirae (Hellmayr, 1910); L. c. pallidigula (Zimmer, JT, 1945) | Bolivia, Brazil, Colombia, Ecuador, French Guiana, Guyana, Peru, Suriname, and Venezuela. | Size: Habitat: Diet: | LC |
| Yellow-crested tanager Male | Loriotus rufiventer (Spix, 1825) | Peru, Acre and northwestern Bolivia | Size: Habitat: Diet: | LC |
| White-shouldered tanager Male Female | Loriotus luctuosus (d'Orbigny & Lafresnaye, 1837) Five subspecies: L. l. axillaris (Lawrence, 1874); L. l. nitidissimus (Salvin, 1870); L. l. panamensis (Todd, 1917); L. l. luctuosus (d'Orbigny & Lafresnaye, 1837); L. l. flaviventris (Sclater, PL, 1856) | Honduras to Panama, South America south to Ecuador and southern Brazil, and on Trinidad. | Size: Habitat: Diet: | LC |
