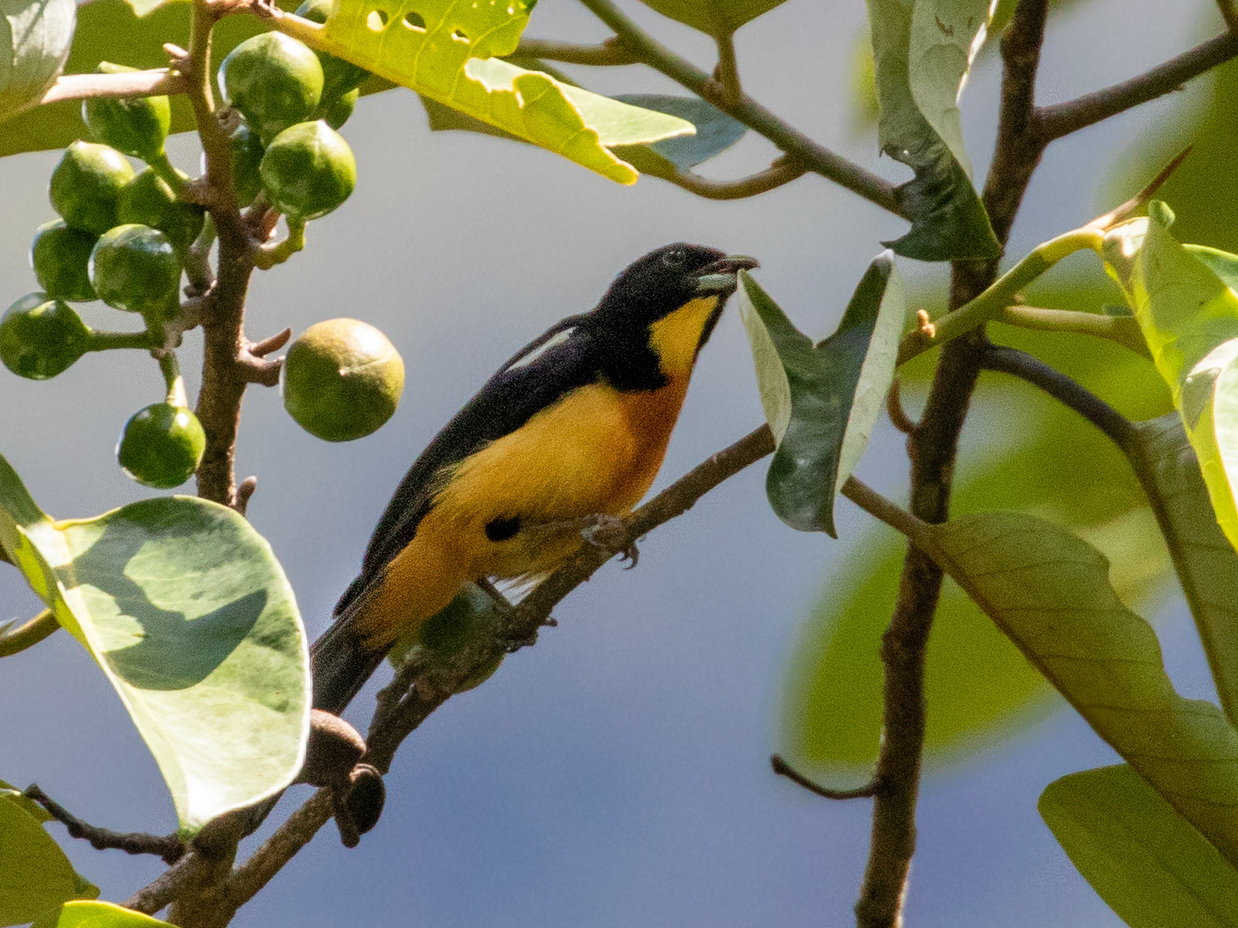

Conservation status
- Least Concern (IUCN 3.1)

Scientific classification
- Kingdom: Animalia
- Phylum: Chordata
- Class: Aves
- Order: Passeriformes
- Family: Thraupidae
- Genus: Loriotus
- Species: L. rufiventer

Binomial name
- Loriotus rufiventer (Spix, 1825)

= Yellow-crested tanager =

Species of bird

The yellow-crested tanager (Loriotus rufiventer) is a species of bird in the family Thraupidae, the tanagers and allies. It is found in Bolivia, Brazil, and Peru.

== Taxonomy and systematics ==
The yellow-crested tanager was formally described in 1825 with the binomial Tanagra rufiventer. It eventually was reassigned to the genus Tachyphonus. A molecular phylogenetic study published in 2014 found that Tachyphonus was polyphyletic. In the subsequent reorganization the genus Loriotus was resurrected for the yellow-crested tanager and two other species. The genus had been introduced in 1821 by the Polish zoologist Feliks Paweł Jarocki.

The IOC, AviList, the Clements taxonomy, and the South American Classification Committee have adopted the new genus. However, in 2016 BirdLife International's Handbook of the Birds of the World (HBW) instead assigned the yellow-crested tanager and the other two species to the genus Islerothraupis and retains them there as of late 2025.

The yellow-crested tanager is monotypic.

== Description ==
The yellow-crested tanager is 15 to 16 cm (5.9 to 6.3 in) long and weighs 15.5 to 20 g (0.55 to 0.71 oz). The species is sexually dimorphic. Adult males have a mostly black head with the eponymous buffy yellow mid-crown and rear crown, which however is usually partially hidden. Their sides of their neck, their nape, and their upper back are black and their lower back, rump, and uppertail coverts deep buff. Their tail is black. Their wings are mostly black with white outer scapulars. Their throat is dark yellow-buff with a narrow black band below it. The center of their breast is tawny and the rest of their breast and belly, flanks, and undertail coverts are yellowish buff. Adult females have a gray head and an olive nape, back, wings, and tail. Their throat is whitish, their breast and belly ochraceous buff, and their undertail coverts buff with a cinnamon tinge. Both sexes have a dark brown iris, a blackish maxilla, a mostly grayish blue mandible, and dark gray to leaden legs. Juveniles are similar to adult females but with an olive crown, and their throat is the same ochraceous buff as the breast.

== Distribution and habitat ==
The yellow-crested tanager is found in eastern Peru from extreme western Loreto Department south to northern Cuzco Department and east into far western Brazil's Acre and western Amazonas states. From Cuzco its range continues south in a narrow band into Bolivia to northwestern Cochabamba Department.

The yellow-crested tanager primarily inhabits the middle to upper levels of tropical evergreen forest, especially terra firme and várzea. It also inhabits secondary forest. In elevation it reaches 1,250 m (4,100 ft) in Peru, 1,200 m (3,900 ft) in Brazil, and 1,650 m (5,400 ft) in Bolivia.

== Behavior ==
=== Movement ===
The yellow-crested tanager is a year-round resident.

=== Feeding ===
The yellow-crested tanager's diet is not known in detail but includes insects and fruits. It usually in pairs and almost always as members of a mixed-species feeding flock. It feeds energetically through foliage and gleans prey while perched and with a short flutter-flights.

=== Breeding ===
Nothing is known about the yellow-crested tanager's breeding biology.

=== Vocalization ===
Two yellow-crested tanager vocalizations are "high tswee and buzzier dzz dzz dzz notes"; they may be either songs or calls.

== Status ==
The IUCN has assessed the yellow-crested tanager as being of Least Concern. It has a large range; its population size is not known and is believed to be decreasing. No immediate threats have been identified. It is considered "fairly common" in Peru and "frequent to uncommon" in Brazil. It has "a high degree of sensitivity to human disturbance relative to other Neotropical birds" but occurs in many national parks and other protected areas.
