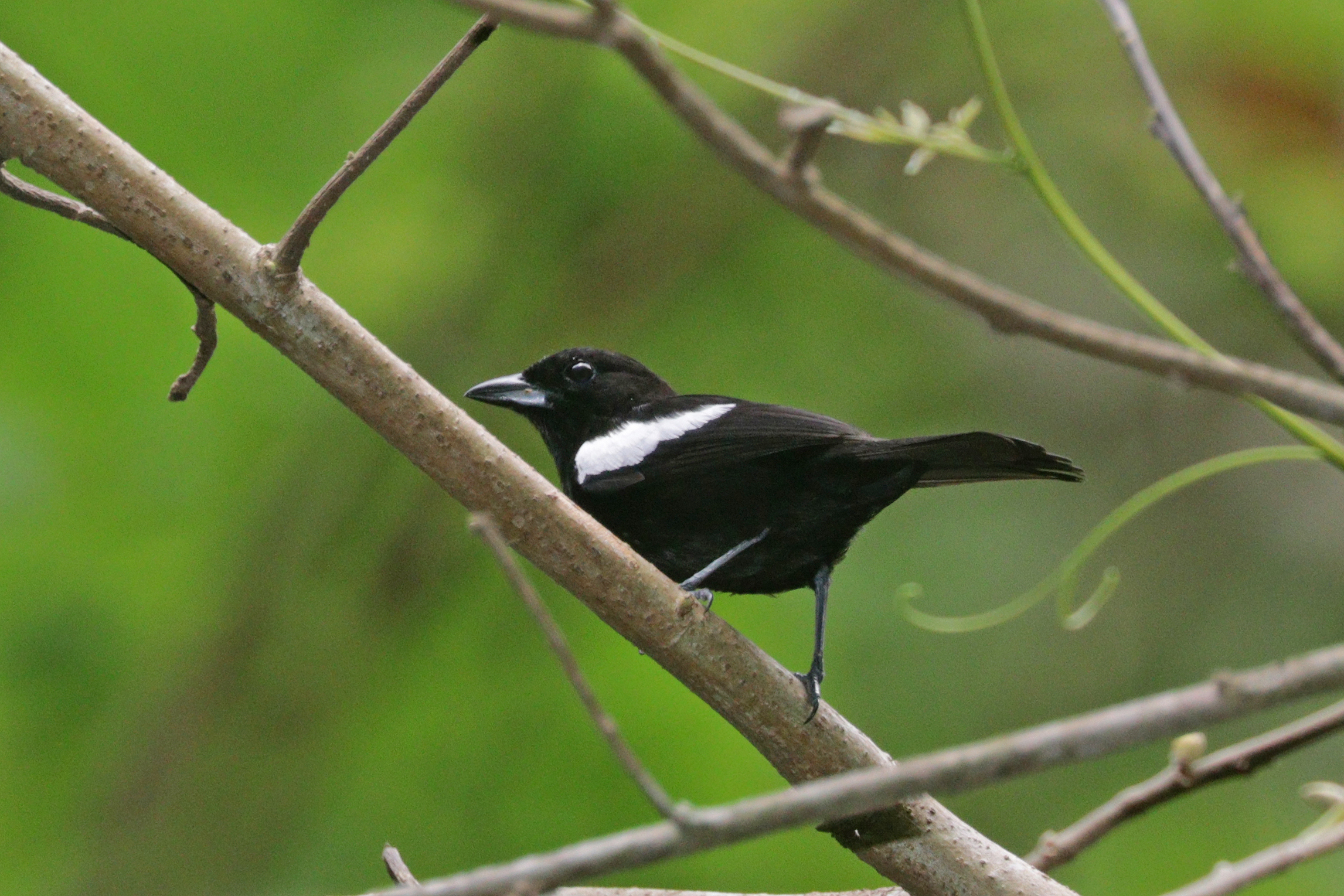
- Male L. l. panamensis, Anton Valley, Panama

Conservation status
- Least Concern (IUCN 3.1)

Scientific classification
- Kingdom: Animalia
- Phylum: Chordata
- Class: Aves
- Order: Passeriformes
- Family: Thraupidae
- Genus: Loriotus
- Species: L. luctuosus

Binomial name
- Loriotus luctuosus (d'Orbigny & Lafresnaye, 1837)

= White-shouldered tanager =

Species of bird

The white-shouldered tanager (Loriotus luctuosus) is a species of bird in the family Thraupidae, the tanagers and allies. It is found from Honduras to Panama, on Trinidad, and in every mainland South American country except Argentina, Chile, Paraguay, and Uruguay.

== Taxonomy and systematics ==
The white-shouldered tanager was formally described in 1837 with the binomial Tachyphonus luctuosus. A molecular phylogenetic study published in 2014 found that Tachyphonus was polyphyletic. In the subsequent reorganization the genus Loriotus was resurrected for the white-shouldered tanager and two other species. The genus had been introduced in 1821 by the Polish zoologist Feliks Paweł Jarocki.

The IOC, AviList, the Clements taxonomy, and the North and South American Classification Committees have adopted the new genus. However, in 2016 BirdLife International's Handbook of the Birds of the World (HBW) instead assigned the white-shouldered tanager and the other two species to the genus Islerothraupis and retains them there as of late 2025.

The white-shouldered tanager has these five subspecies:

- L. l. axillaris (Lawrence, 1874)
- L. l. nitidissimus (Salvin, 1870)
- L. l. panamensis (Todd, 1917)
- L. l. luctuosus (d'Orbigny & Lafresnaye, 1837)
- L. l. flaviventris (Sclater, PL, 1856)

== Description ==
The white-shouldered tanager is 13 to 14 cm (5.1 to 5.5 in) long and weighs 11.5 to 15 g (0.41 to 0.53 oz). The species is sexually dimorphic. Adult males of the nominate subspecies L. c. cristatus are almost entirely glossy black. Their eponymous white shoulder is formed by white marginal, lesser, and median wing coverts. They also have white underwing coverts. Adult females have a gray head and a bright olive-green nape and upperparts including the wing coverts. Their throat is grayish white and their underparts yellow with an olive tinge on the breast. Both sexes have a dark brown iris, a blackish bill with a slightly paler base to the mandible, and dark gray legs. Juveniles are similar to adult females but duller and more uniform in color. Males of the similar white-lined tanager (Tachyphonus rufus) are larger and have a smaller white patch that is usually visible only in flight. The two females are very different.

The other subspecies of the white-shouldered tanager differ from the nominate and each other thus:

- L. l. axillaris: male has larger shoulder patch and mostly hidden orange and cinnamon crown patch; female has mostly olive head with gray on the crown, a buff throat, and pure yellow underparts; both have all-dark bill
- L. l. nitidissimus: male has larger shoulder patch and hidden yellow crown patch; female has mostly olive head with gray on the crown, a whitish throat, and pure yellow underparts; both have very pale base to mandible
- L. l. panamensis: male has largest shoulder patch; female has brighter more olive-green upperparts, a whiter chin and throat, and brighter yellow underparts
- L. l. flaviventris: like nominate with slightly longer bill and wings

== Distribution and habitat ==
The white-shouldered tanager has a disjunct distribution. The subspecies are found thus:

- L. l. axillaris: Caribbean slope from northern and eastern Honduras south through Nicaragua and Costa Rica into northwestern Panama's Bocas del Toro Province
- L. l. nitidissimus: Pacific slope from central Puntarenas and west-central San José provinces in western Costa Rica into western Panama's Chiriquí Province
- L. l. panamensis: Caribbean and Pacific slopes of Panama from Coclé Province south into northern Colombia and east into western Venezuela, there in Zulia and along the western base of the Andes; and from far northwestern Ecuador south on the Pacific slope just into extreme northwestern Peru's Tumbes Department
- L. l. luctuosus: eastern slope of Venezuelan Andes from Barinas south on eastern Andean slope through Ecuador and Peru into and across northern Bolivia and from there sweeping north through Amazonian Brazil (except its northwest) into most of eastern Venezuela and the Guianas; southern limit in Brazil is Mato Grosso and western Goiás
- L. l. flaviventris: Trinidad and extreme northern and eastern Sucre in northeastern Venezuela

In Central America, northern Colombia and northwestern Venezuela, and on the Pacific slope of Ecuador the white-shouldered tanager primarily inhabits mature secondary forest and the edges of primary forest. In the Amazon Basin it is mostly found in terra firme and várzea forest but also in secondary forest. In elevation it reaches 750 m (2,500 ft) in Honduras, 1,000 m (3,300 ft) in Costa Rica, 1,500 m (4,900 ft) in Colombia, 1,000 m (3,300 ft) in Peru, and 1,100 m (3,600 ft) in Brazil. In Ecuador it is mostly found below 800 m (2,600 ft) but locally higher in the northwest. In Venezuela it reaches 900 m (3,000 ft) north of the Orinoco River and 1,100 m (3,600 ft) south of it.

== Behavior ==
=== Movement ===
The white-shouldered tanager is a year-round resident.

=== Feeding ===
The white-shouldered tanager feeds on insects and lesser amounts of fruits. It usually in pairs and family groups and usually as part of a mixed-species feeding flock. It feeds energetically, hopping through foliage (especially tangles of vines) and snatching prey while perched, with a lunge, and with a short flutter-flight. It forages mostly in the forest's middle level.

=== Breeding ===
The white-shouldered tanager's breeding biology is known only from Trinidad. There its season includes at least April, June, and September. Its nest is a deep cup made from grass and lined with finer fibers. It is typically in the forest undergrowth between about 1 and 1.5 m (3 and 5 ft) above the ground. The clutch is three eggs that are buff to cream with reddish brown blotches. The incubation period, time to fledging, and details of parental care are not known.

=== Vocalization ===
The white-shouldered tanager's song is "a thin, high seet-seet-seet...sometimes in series mixed with seet or quick seet-seet notes". It is also described as "a repetitive, musical note...tchert tchert tchert tchert..., interspersed with tseet notes". Its calls include a "high-pitched, sharp, almost hissing tseer and "a rising swee and a low chep".

== Status ==
The IUCN has assessed the white-shouldered tanager as being of Least Concern. It has an extremely large range; its estimated population of at least five million mature individuals is believed to be decreasing. No immediate threats have been identified. It is considered "uncommon" in Honduras, "fairly common" in Costa Rica, "common" in Colombia and Venezuela, and "common to frequent" in Brazil. It is "fairly common" in western Ecuador and "notably less numerous" in the east. In Peru it is "fairly common" in Tumbes and "fairly common and widespread" in most of the east but "scarce and very local" in the northeast. It is found in many national parks and public and private preserves.
