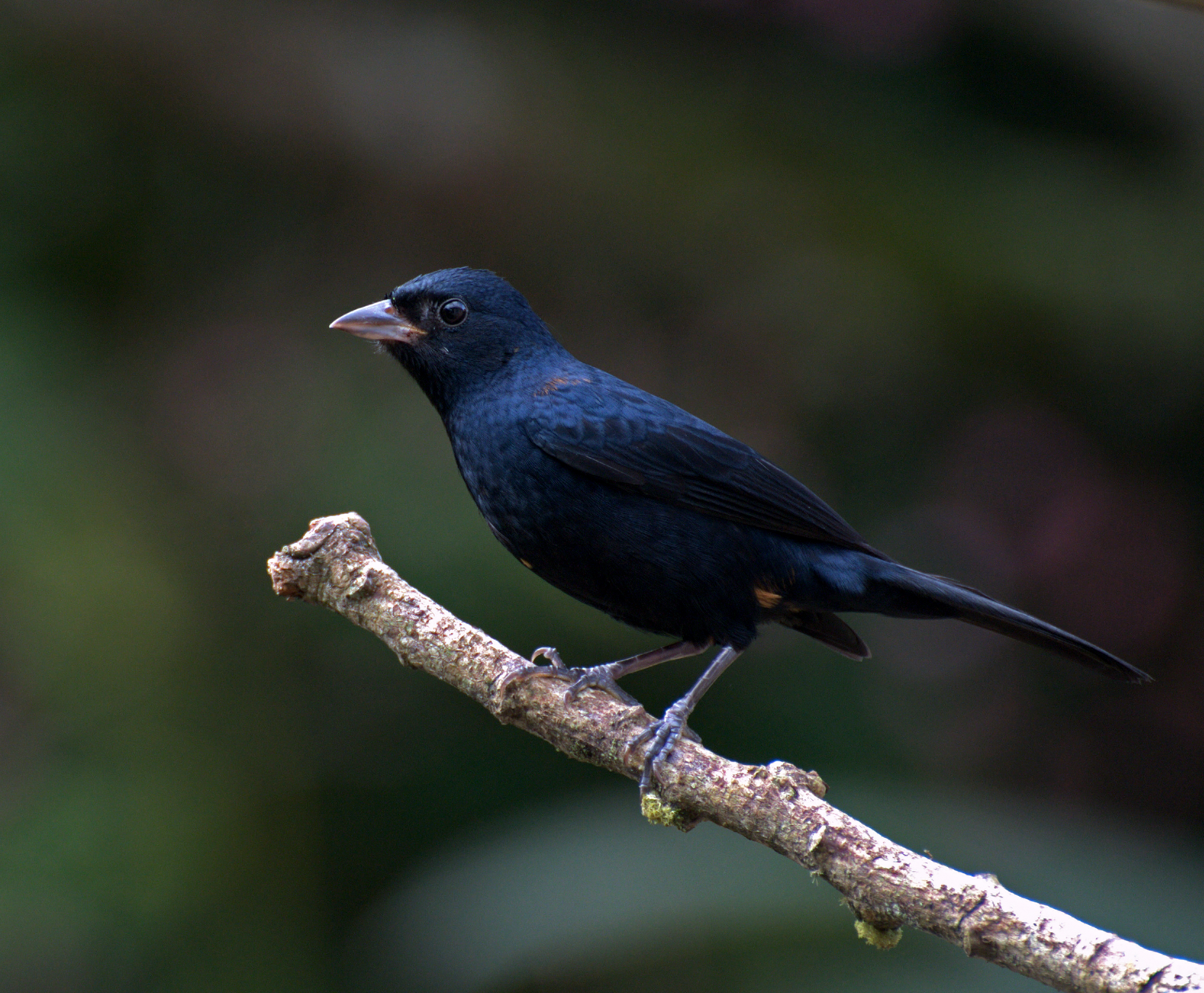
- Male
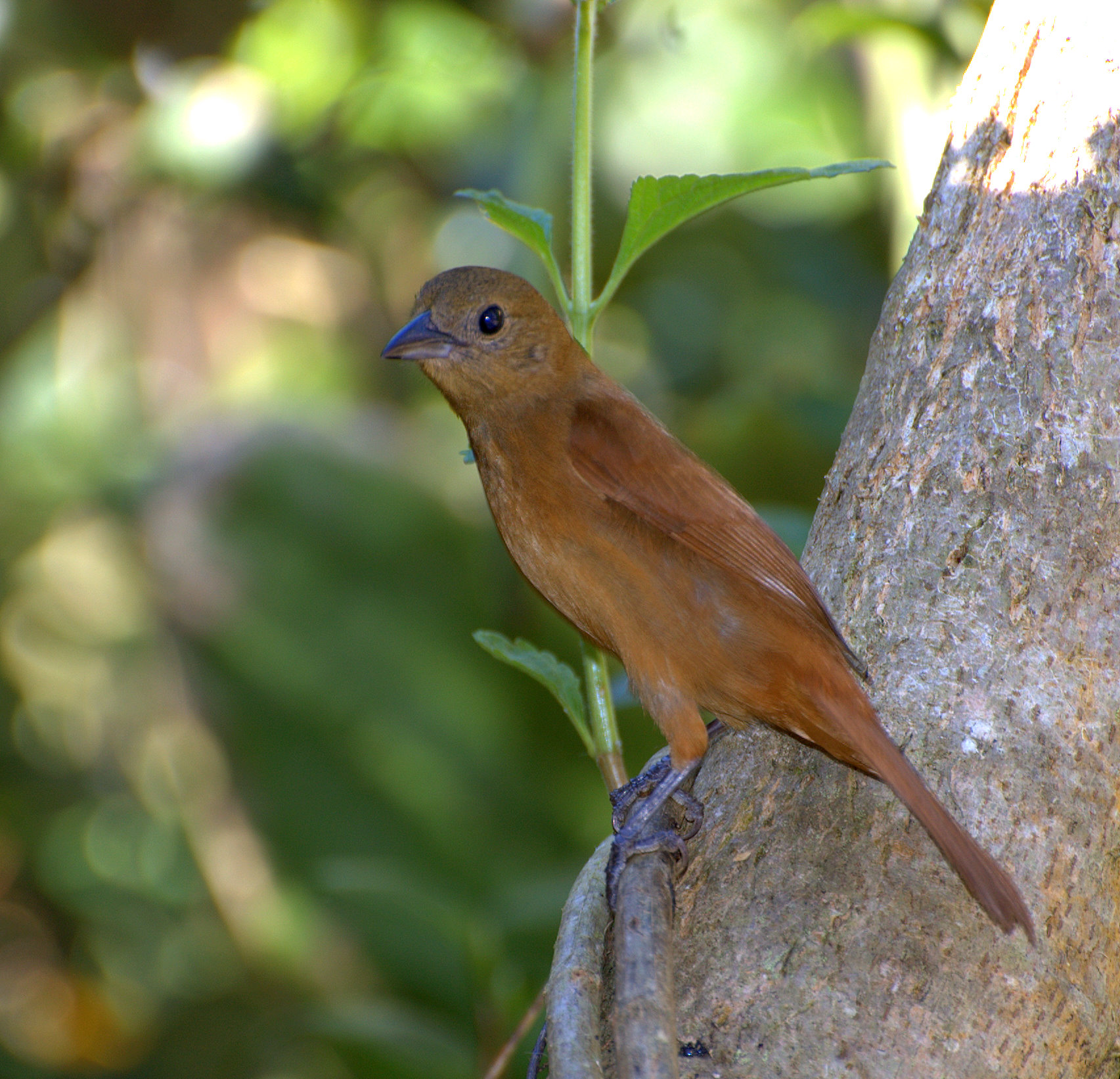
- Female

Conservation status
- Least Concern (IUCN 3.1)

Scientific classification
- Kingdom: Animalia
- Phylum: Chordata
- Class: Aves
- Order: Passeriformes
- Family: Thraupidae
- Genus: Tachyphonus
- Species: T. coronatus

Binomial name
- Tachyphonus coronatus (Vieillot, 1822)

= Ruby-crowned tanager =

Species of bird

The ruby-crowned tanager (Tachyphonus coronatus) is a species of bird in the family Thraupidae, the tanagers and allies. It is found in Argentina, Brazil, Paraguay, and as a vagrant to Uruguay.

== Taxonomy and systematics ==
The ruby-crowned tanager was formally described in 1822 with the binomial Agelaius Coronatus [sic], mistakenly classifying it as a New World blackbird. It now shares the genus Tachyphonus with four other species and is sister to the white-lined tanager (T. rufus).

The ruby-crowned tanager is monotypic.

== Description ==
The ruby-crowned tanager is about 16 cm (6.3 in) long and weighs 26 to 33 g (0.92 to 1.2 oz). The species is sexually dimorphic. Adult males are mostly glossy blue-black. They have the eponymous red patch in the center of their crown, though it is usually hidden except during a display. They sometimes have a white patch on the scapulars that also is seldom visible. Their underwing coverts are white and show well in flight. Adult females have a grayish head. Their upperparts and wings are rufous-brown and their rump, uppertail coverts, and tail are more rufescent. Their throat is pale yellowish buff and the rest of their underparts a darker yellowish buff with some faint dusky streaks on the breast. Both sexes have a dark brown iris, a black maxilla, a bluish gray mandible with a largely black tip, and dark gray legs.

== Distribution and habitat ==
The ruby-crowned tanager is found primarily in southern Brazil south of a line approximately from northwestern Mato Grosso do Sul east to the Atlantic in Rio de Janeiro state and extending to northeastern Rio Grande do Sul. From there its range extends west into eastern Paraguay and northeastern Argentina's Misiones and northern Corrientes provinces. It has also appeared in Uruguay as a vagrant.

The ruby-crowned tanager inhabits a variety of somewhat open landscapes including open woodland, shrubby secondary forest, orchards and plantations, and parks and gardens in settled areas such as suburbs. In elevation it ranges in elevation overall from sea level to 1,300 m (4,300 ft) but is found below 1,200 m (3,900 ft) in Brazil.

== Behavior ==
=== Movement ===
The ruby-crowned tanager is generally a year-round resident but some migration north from Rio de Janeiro is suspected.

=== Feeding ===
The ruby-crowned tanager feeds on arthropods, fruit, and seeds; fruits include both wild and cultivated species. It usually forages singly, in pairs, or in small family groups, rarely in larger groups, and rarely as part of a mixed-species feeding flock. It forages in the forest interior's mid-level and higher but lower at its edges. It feeds restlessly, flicking its wings as it examines foliage for arthropod prey.

=== Breeding ===
The ruby-crowned tanager's breeding season has not been fully defined but appears to span at least October to January in southern Brazil. Its nest is a cup made from grass with a lining of rootlets and is typically in dense vegetation within about 2 m (7 ft) of the ground. The clutch is two or three eggs that are pink to white with red and brown markings. In captivity the incubation period is about 13 days. Nothing else is known about the species' breeding biology.

=== Vocalization ===
The ruby-crowned tanager's song is described as a "simple high chirping tjur wdit tjur- -" and its call a "high, bouncing trit-trit trit- -".

== Status ==
The IUCN has assessed the ruby-crowned tanager as being of Least Concern. It has a large range; its population size is not known but is believed to be stable. No immediate threats have been identified. It is considered "common to frequent" in Brazil. It is found "in numerous protected areas in both Argentina and [southern] Brazil, and adapts well to a variety of edge, second-growth and disturbed habitats".
