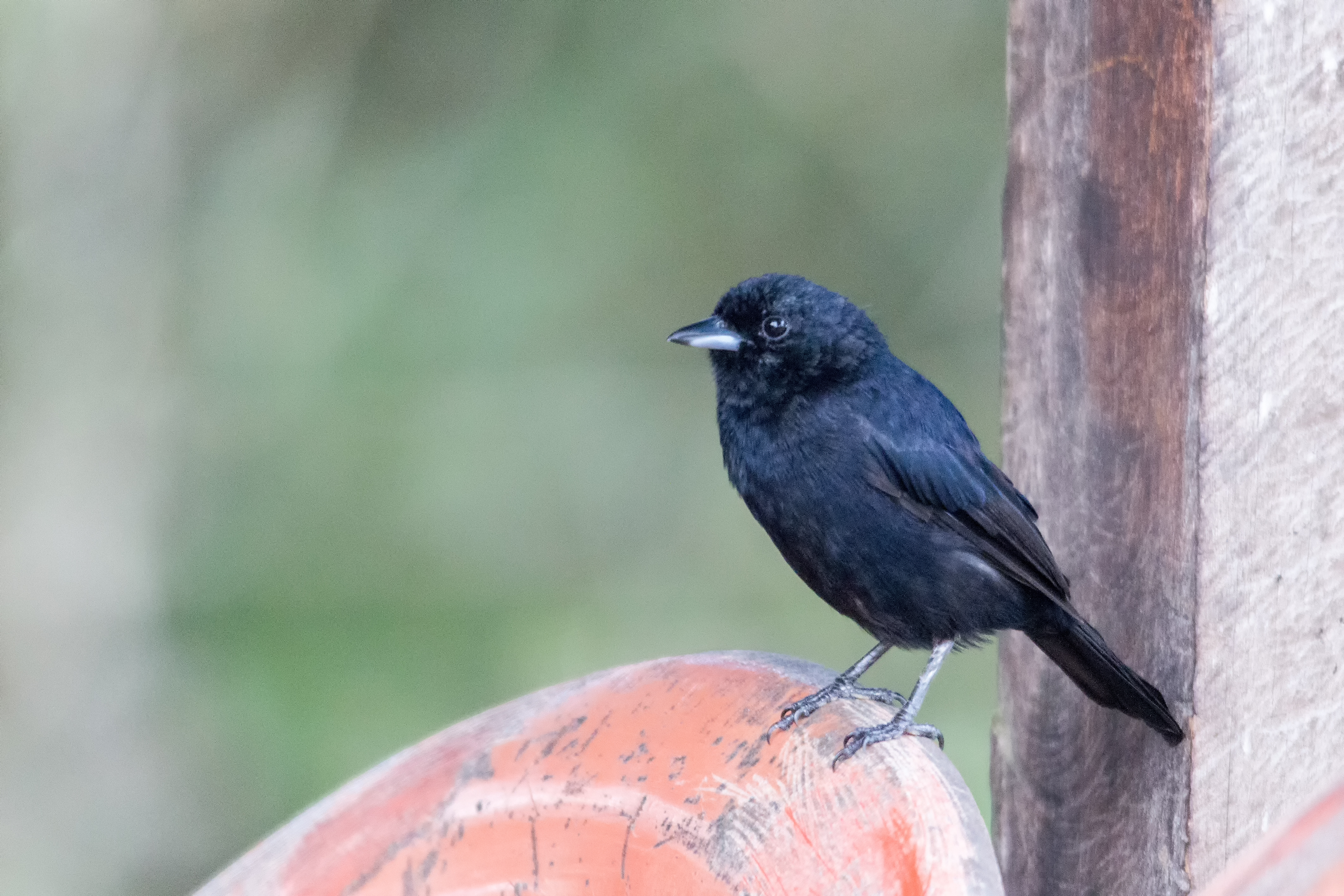
- Male
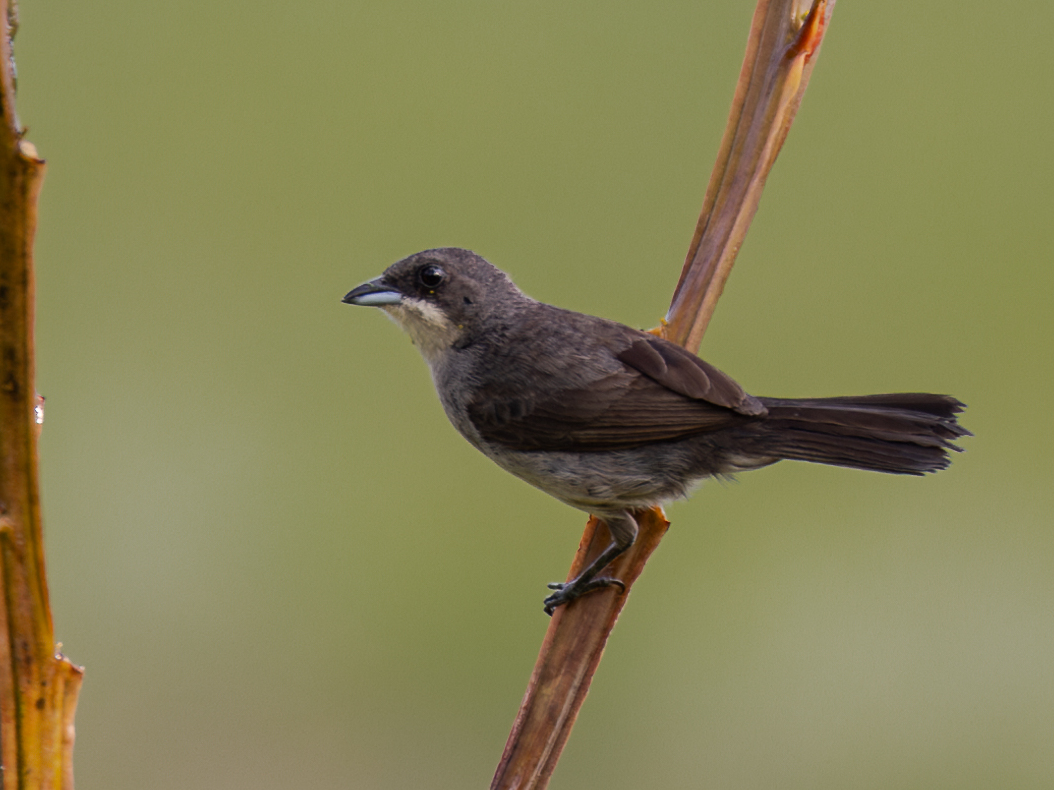
- Female

Conservation status
- Least Concern (IUCN 3.1)

Scientific classification
- Kingdom: Animalia
- Phylum: Chordata
- Class: Aves
- Order: Passeriformes
- Family: Thraupidae
- Genus: Tachyphonus
- Species: T. phoenicius

Binomial name
- Tachyphonus phoenicius Swainson, 1838

= Red-shouldered tanager =

Species of bird

The red-shouldered tanager (Tachyphonus phoenicius) is a species of bird in the family Thraupidae, the tanagers and allies. It is found in Bolivia, Brazil, Colombia, French Guiana, Guyana, Peru, Suriname, and Venezuela.

== Taxonomy, systematics, and etymology ==
The red-shouldered tanager was formally described in 1838 with its current binomial Tachyphonus phoenicius. The binomial is derived from Greek; the genus name Tachyphonus is from the words takhus meaning fast, and phone meaning sound or voice, which translates “fast speaking”. The specific epithet phoenicius means “crimson, dark red”.

The red-shouldered tanager is monotypic.

== Description ==
The red-shouldered tanager is about 15 cm (5.9 in) long and weighs 17 to 25 g (0.60 to 0.88 oz). The species is sexually dimorphic. Adult males are mostly glossy black. They have a small seldom-visible red and white patch on the bend of the wing and marginal coverts and white underwing coverts. Adult females have a dark brownish gray crown that appears scalloped due to dark feather centers and paler edges. They have a slightly darker mask from the lores to past the eye and an otherwise dark grayish brown face. Their upperparts, wings, and tail are dark brownish gray. Their throat is whitish, their breast and sides dirty white with a gray tinge, and their belly dingy creamy white. Both sexes have a dark brown iris, a black maxilla, a pale blue-gray mandible with a dark tip, and horn-gray legs. Juveniles resemble adult females with dusky streaks on the underparts.

== Distribution and habitat ==
The red-shouldered tanager has a highly disjunct distribution with three separate populations. The smallest range is in northern Peru, with sub-populations in the valley of the Mayo River in Loreto Department and between the lower Huallaga and Marañón rivers in San Martín Department. A second extends from western Meta Department in central Colombia east across southern Venezuela's Amazonas and southern Bolívar states, extreme northern Amazonas and Roraima states in far northwestern Brazil, and the Guianas to the Atlantic in far northern Brazil's Amapá state. The third is from extreme northern Bolivia into Brazil's central Amazon Basin. There its range is within a line generally from northern Rondônia northeast to the Amazon River in north-central Pará, then south to central Pará, east into Tocantins, and then southwest to west-central Mato Grosso.

The red-shouldered tanager primarily inhabits landscapes on nutrient-poor soils such as white sands. These include areas of savanna with bushes, thickets, woodland patches, and rock outcrops and also pockets of savanna in forest. In elevation it ranges between 1,000 and 1,350 m (3,300 and 4,400 ft) in Peru's Mayo Valley. It reaches 2,000 m (6,600 ft) in Venezuela and 400 m (1,300 ft) in Colombia, and occurs mostly to 400 m (1,300 ft) but locally higher in Brazil.

== Behavior ==
=== Movement ===
The red-shouldered tanager is believed to be a year-round resident.

=== Feeding ===
The red-shouldered tanager feeds on small fruits and arthropods. It usually forages singly, in pairs, and in family groups and sometimes in woodlands as members of a mixed-species feeding flock. It feeds mostly in shrubs between about 1 and 6 m (3 and 20 ft) of the ground, though it has been observed feeding higher in palms and woodlands in Peru.

=== Breeding ===
The red-shouldered tanager's breeding season has not been defined but appears to include February and March in Suriname. There its nest is a cup made mostly from grass, built on the ground and hidden by grass or bushes. The clutch is one or two eggs that are grayish with chocolate-brown blotches on the larger end.

=== Vocalization ===
The red-shouldered tanager's song in Venezuela is described as "a musical but rather repetitive and medium-pitched cheurt- che’e’e’t-che’e’e’t, cheurt- che’e’e’t-che’e’e’t-che’e’e’t,...". Its calls include "high, thin, insignificant chup, cheup, and tsit", "a wheezy tew and a nasal, almost thrush-like perk", and a "low, soft, yet staccato tuh teh tuh- -".

== Status ==
The IUCN has assessed the red-shouldered tanager as being of Least Concern. It has a very large range; its population size is not known but is believed to be stable. No immediate threats have been identified. It is considered "locally common" in Colombia, "fairly common but very local" in Peru, "uncommon to locally common" in Venezuela, and "frequent to uncommon" in Brazil. Each of its three ranges includes at least one protected area. "This species is adapted to scrubby second growth and semi-open habitats, and is capable of persisting in degraded areas."
