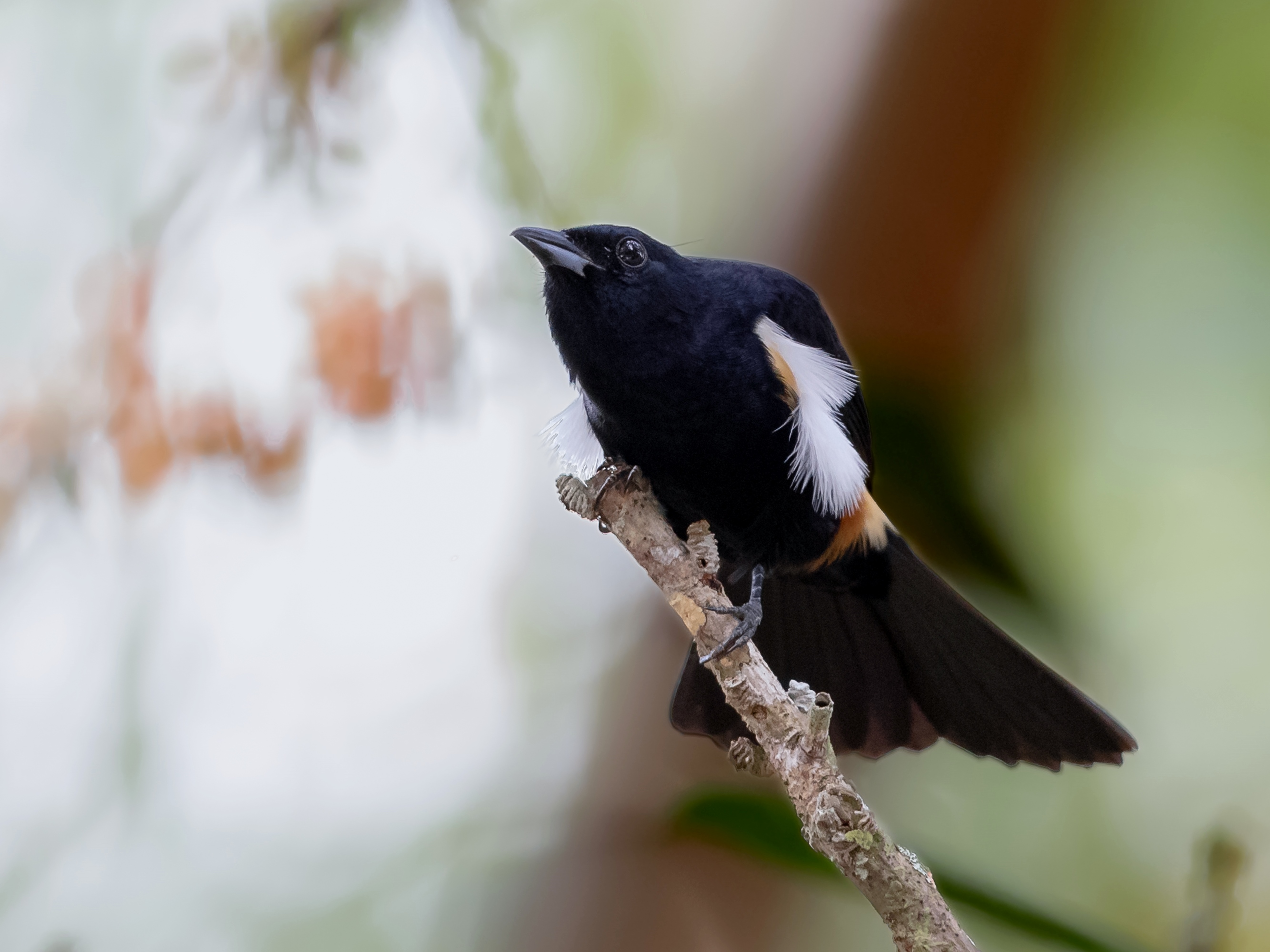
- Male
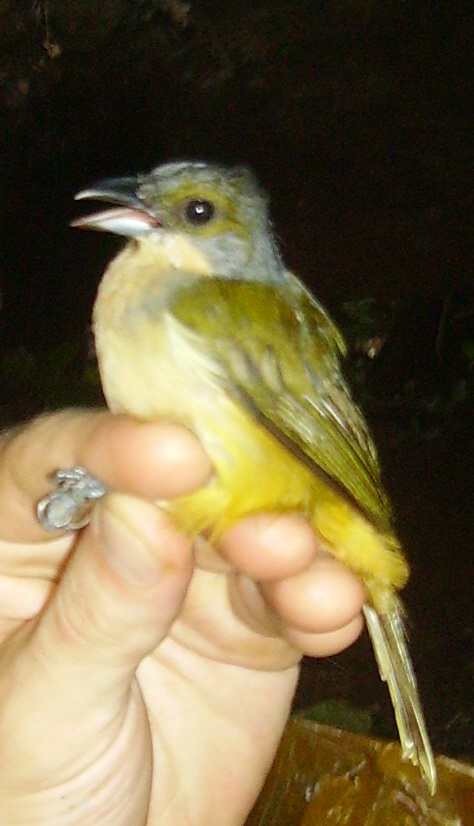
- Female

Conservation status
- Least Concern (IUCN 3.1)

Scientific classification
- Kingdom: Animalia
- Phylum: Chordata
- Class: Aves
- Order: Passeriformes
- Family: Thraupidae
- Genus: Tachyphonus
- Species: T. surinamus

Binomial name
- Tachyphonus surinamus (Linnaeus, 1766)

Synonyms
- See text

= Fulvous-crested tanager =

Species of bird

The fulvous-crested tanager (Tachyphonus surinamus) is a species of bird in the family Thraupidae, the tanagers and allies. It is found in Brazil, Colombia, Ecuador, French Guiana, Guyana, Peru, Suriname, and Venezuela.

== Taxonomy and systematics ==
In 1760 the French zoologist Mathurin Jacques Brisson included a description of the fulvous-crested tanager in the supplement to his Ornithologie based on a specimen collected Suriname. He used the French name Le merle de Surinam and the Latin name Merula surinamensis. Although Brisson coined Latin names, these do not conform to the binomial system and are not recognized by the International Commission on Zoological Nomenclature. When in 1766 the Swedish naturalist Carl Linnaeus updated his Systema Naturae for the twelfth edition he added 240 species that had been previously described by Brisson in his Ornithologie. One of these was the fulvous-crested tanager. Linnaeus included a terse description, coined the binomial name Turdus surinamus, and cited Brisson's work.

The IOC, AviList, the Clements taxonomy, and the South American Classification Committee assign the species to the genus Tachyphonus that was introduced by the French ornithologist Louis Pierre Vieillot in 1816. BirdLife International's Handbook of the Birds of the World (HBW) also initially did so, but in 2016 assigned the fulvous-crested tanager to its own genus Maschalethraupis. It retains it there as of late 2025.

The fulvous-crested tanager has these four subspecies:

- T. s. surinamus (Linnaeus, 1766)
- T. s. brevipes Lafresnaye, 1846
- T. s. napensis Lawrence, 1864
- T. s. insignis Hellmayr, 1906

== Description ==
The fulvous-crested tanager is 15 to 17 cm (5.9 to 6.7 in) long and weighs 15 to 27 g (0.53 to 0.95 oz). The species has a short, somewhat thin, bill and is sexually dimorphic. Adult males of the nominate subspecies T. s. surinamus are mostly glossy black. They have a yellow-buff patch in the center of the crown that can be erected as the eponymous crest. They have a buff rump, white on the bend of the wing, buffy white pectoral tufts, long maroon-chestnut to carmine flank feathers, and white underwing coverts. Adult females have a mostly gray head with a yellowish area of variable size around the eye; it often includes a faint dusky line through the eye and usually has olive around it. Their upperparts, wings, and tail are dark olive. Their throat, breast, and flanks are buffy to grayish white with a brownish tinge on the breast and a grayish tinge on the flanks. Their belly and undertail coverts are ochraceous. Juveniles resemble duller and plainer adult females. Both sexes of all subspecies have a dark brown iris, a blackish maxilla, a blue-gray mandible, and dark gray legs.

The other subspecies of the fulvous-crested tanager differ from the nominate and each other thus:

- T. s. brevipes: male has deep buff rump, white pectoral tufts, and dark rufous flanks; female is paler than nominate with cinnamon-buff to orangish buff underparts and olive-tinged flanks
- T. s. napensis: like brevipes except male has dark rufous rump
- T. s. insignis: male has darker tawny rump and paler tawny flanks than nominate; female is like nominate

== Distribution and habitat ==
The fulvous-crested tanager is a bird of the Amazon Basin and the Guiana Shield. The subspecies are found thus:

- T. s. surinamus: Venezuela from southeastern Sucre, eastern Monagas, Delta Amacuro, most of Amazonas, and northern Bolívar states east through the Guianas and northern Brazil east of the Negro River and north of the Amazon River
- T. s. brevipes: from approximately the southeastern half of Colombia south through eastern Ecuador into northeastern Peru to the Amazon and Marañón rivers and east through southern Bolívar in Venezuela and northwestern Brazil north of the Amazon to the Negro
- T. s. napensis: eastern Peru south of the Amazon and Marañón to northern Junín and central Ucayali departments and east into western Brazil south of the Amazon to the Juruá River
- T. s. insignis: Brazil south of the Amazon from the Juruá to the Atlantic

The southern limit of the species in Brazil follows a line across Acre, southern Amazonas, central Rondônia, northwestern Mato Grosso, and Pará to the Atlantic in its northeast.

The fulvous-crested tanager inhabits a variety of humid forest landscapes, many of which are on nutrient-deficient soils. These include terra firme and várzea forest, light woodland, and scrubby and brushy areas with rock outcrops. In elevation it reaches 600 m (2,000 ft) in Colombia, 900 m (3,000 ft) in Ecuador, 750 m (2,500 ft) in Peru, 1,400 m (4,600 ft) in Venezuela, and 900 m (3,000 ft) in Brazil.

== Behavior ==
=== Movement ===
The fulvous-crested tanager is a year-round resident.

=== Feeding ===
The fulvous-crested tanager feeds on insects, fruits, and seeds. It forages mainly in the forest's mid- to upper levels and on its edges, usually as pairs or family groups and often as members of a mixed-species feeding flock.

=== Breeding ===
The one known fulvous-crested tanager nest was discovered in Brazil's Amazonas state in March and held two young nestlings. The nest was a basket made from twigs with leaves on the outside and a lining of thin rootlets. It was in a fork in a Bactris elegans palm about 1.5 m (5 ft) above the ground. Both parents were attending the brood. Nothing else is known about the species' breeding biology.

=== Vocalization ===
The fulvous-crested tanager's song is described as "a series of high hummingbird-like screeches interspersed with rich chip notes: soo-see-soo-see'chip'chip soo-see-soo-see...". Its calls are "high tseet notes and a rapid, rich chatter".

== Status ==
The IUCN has assessed the fulvous-crested tanager as being of Least Concern. It has an extremely large range; its population size is not known and is believed to be decreasing. "Forests within the range are contracting slowly due to the expansion of the agricultural frontier." It is considered "locally common" in Colombia, "uncommon but widespread" in Peru, "uncommon to locally fairly common" in Venezuela, and "frequent to uncommon" in Brazil. It is found in many national parks and public and private preserves. "This species range encompasses large areas of intact forest not formally protected, but at low risk of deforestation in the immediate future, ensuring at least the short-term viability of this species."
