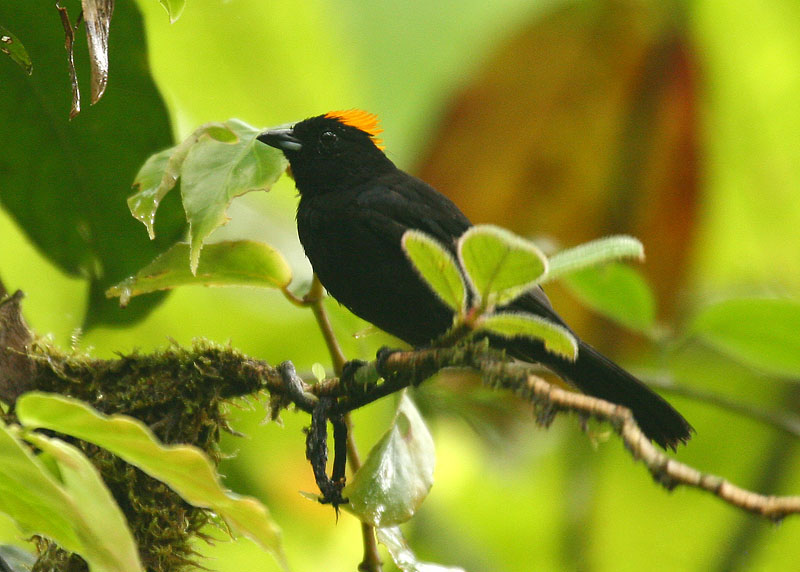
- A male in NW Ecuador

Conservation status
- Least Concern (IUCN 3.1)

Scientific classification
- Kingdom: Animalia
- Phylum: Chordata
- Class: Aves
- Order: Passeriformes
- Family: Thraupidae
- Genus: Tachyphonus
- Species: T. delatrii

Binomial name
- Tachyphonus delatrii Lafresnaye, 1847

= Tawny-crested tanager =

Species of bird

The tawny-crested tanager (Tachyphonus delatrii) is a species of bird in the family Thraupidae, the tanagers and allies. It is found in Colombia, Costa Rica, Ecuador, Honduras, Nicaragua, and Panama.

== Taxonomy and systematics ==
The tawny-crested tanager was formally described in 1847 with its current binomial Tachyphonus delatrii. The IOC, AviList, the Clements taxonomy, and the North and South American Classification Committees retain it in the genus Tachyphonus. BirdLife International's Handbook of the Birds of the World (HBW) also initially did so, but in 2016 assigned the tawny-crested tanager to its own genus Chrysocorypha. It retains it there as of late 2025.

The tawny-crested tanager is monotypic.

== Description ==
The tawny-crested tanager is about 14 cm (5.5 in) long and weighs 14 to 21 g (0.49 to 0.74 oz). The species has a short, somewhat thin, bill and is sexually dimorphic. Adult males are mostly glossy black. They have a rather short tawny to dark yellow crest that provides its English name, a small seldom-visible white patch on the bend of the wing, and white underwing coverts. Adult females have a grayish brown head and dark olive-brown upperparts. Their wing coverts, flight feathers, and tail are dusky. Their underparts are a slightly paler olive-brown than the upperparts, with a still paler throat. Both sexes have a reddish brown iris, a black maxilla, a black mandible with a pale greenish gray to bluish gray base, and blackish legs.

An analysis of measurements taken from more than 200 adult specimens showed positive relationships between latitude and four morphological characters: wing length, tail length, bill length and bill width. However, the size and color of its crest is variable but shows no geographical pattern.

== Distribution and habitat ==
The tawny-crested tanager is found from eastern Honduras south on the Caribbean slope through Nicaragua, Costa Rica, and Panama into northwestern Colombia. In Colombia it is found at the northern ends of the Western and Central Andes to the central Magdalena River valley and south along the Pacific slope and into northwestern Ecuador as far as northern Santo Domingo de los Tsáchilas Province. It inhabits "Tropical Lowland Evergreen Forest, Montane Evergreen Forest, [and] Secondary Forest" [capitals in original]. It favors areas of low dense vegetation such as forest edges, overgrown secondary forest, and shrubby cut areas and clearings. One source gives its upper elevational limit as 900 m (3,000 ft). However, it reaches 1,500 m (4,900 ft) in Colombia and 1,200 m (3,900 ft) in Costa Rica though it is uncommon above 800 m (2,600 ft) in the latter country. It reaches 750 m (2,500 ft) in Honduras and is mostly below 800 m (2,600 ft) in Ecuador.

== Behavior ==
=== Movement ===
The tawny-crested tanager is mostly a year-round resident though some local movements have been suggested.

=== Feeding ===
The tawny-crested tanager's diet has not been studied but is known to include insects. It typically forages in large flocks of its own species and sometimes also joins mixed-species feeding flocks for a short time. The flocks move quickly with much commotion, taking prey from foliage by pecking, lunging, short flutter-flights, and sometimes while hanging downward.

=== Breeding ===
The tawny-crested tanager's breeding season has not been fully defined. However, it appears to span at least March to June in Costa Rica and February to May in Colombia. One nest was a deep bulky cup with a partial roof. It was made mostly of green moss lined with finer material and was in a shrub about 1.5 m (5 ft) above the ground. It held two eggs that were pale green with fine black markings. Nothing else is known about the species' breeding biology.

=== Vocalization ===
The tawny-crested tanager's song has apparently not been described. Some of its calls are "a high-pitched tzeeet! and a scratchy chit and pweet (often mixed with an agitated chatter)". Calls are also described as a "metallic tchit or zick, a higher tsip or tchewp, and a distinctive high, sibilant zeeet or pseeet with [a] scratchy quality".

== Status ==
The IUCN has assessed the tawny-crested tanager as being of Least Concern. It has a very large range; its estimated population of at least 500,000 mature individuals is believed to be decreasing. No immediate threats have been identified. It is considered fairly common in Honduras, common in Costa Rica's foothills and uncommon in the lowlands, and fairly common in Colombia. It occurs in many protected areas and "also in many areas of unprotected forest and second growth and, while range contraction and fragmentation has occurred in many parts, the species is well adapted to utilize second-growth woodland, and its short-term viability seems assured".
