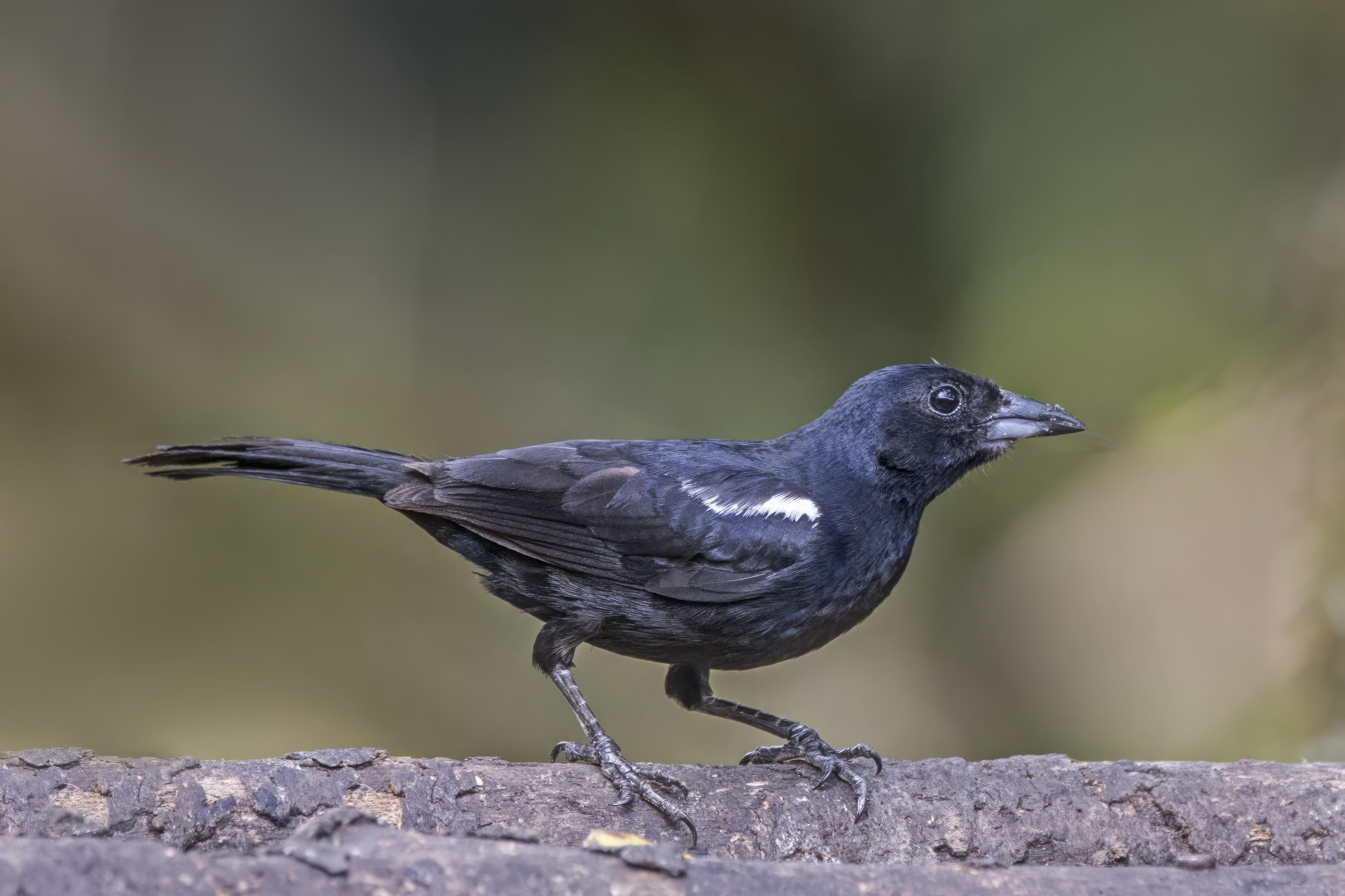
- male, Colombia
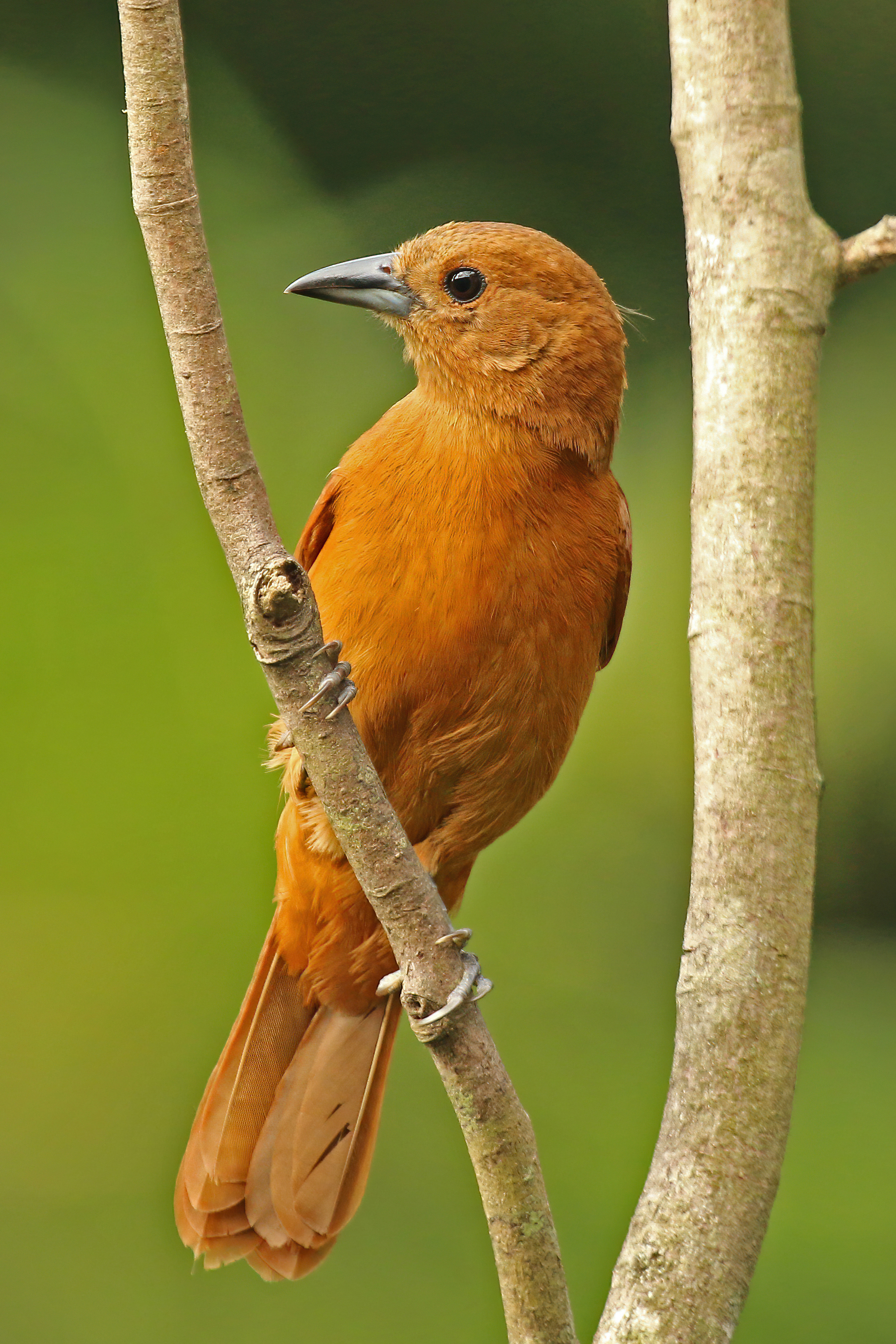
- female, Trinidad

Conservation status
- Least Concern (IUCN 3.1)

Scientific classification
- Kingdom: Animalia
- Phylum: Chordata
- Class: Aves
- Order: Passeriformes
- Family: Thraupidae
- Genus: Tachyphonus
- Species: T. rufus

Binomial name
- Tachyphonus rufus (Boddaert, 1783)

Synonyms
- Tangara rufa (protonym)

= White-lined tanager =

Species of bird

The white-lined tanager (Tachyphonus rufus) is a medium-sized passerine bird in the tanager family Thraupidae. It is a resident breeder from Costa Rica south to northern Argentina and on the islands of Trinidad and Tobago.

== Taxonomy ==
The white-lined tanager was described by the French polymath Georges-Louis Leclerc, Comte de Buffon in 1779 in his Histoire Naturelle des Oiseaux from specimens collected in Cayenne, French Guiana. The female bird was also illustrated in a hand-coloured plate engraved by François-Nicolas Martinet in the Planches Enluminées D'Histoire Naturelle which was produced under the supervision of Edme-Louis Daubenton to accompany Buffon's text. Neither the plate caption nor Buffon's description included a scientific name but in 1783 the Dutch naturalist Pieter Boddaert coined the binomial name Tangara rufa in his catalogue of the Planches Enluminées. The white-lined tanager is now placed in the genus Tachyphonus and was introduced by the French ornithologist Louis Pierre Vieillot in 1816 with the white-lined tanager as the type species. The name combines the Ancient Greek words takhus "fast" and phōneō "to speak". The specific rufus is Latin for "red", "ruddy" or "rufous". The species is monotypic: no subspecies are recognised.

== Description ==
The adult white-lined tanager is 18.5 cm (7.3 in) long and weighs 33 g (1.2 oz). It has a long tail and a mostly black stout pointed bill. The adult male is glossy black, apart from white underwing coverts and a small white patch on the upperwing. These white areas are conspicuous in flight but otherwise rarely visible. Females and immatures are entirely rufous in plumage, somewhat paler below.

== Distribution and habitat ==
It occurs in semi-open areas including gardens.

== Behaviour and ecology ==
=== Breeding ===
In the breeding season, the male displays the white spots which he has under his wings, opening them and closing them in front of the female. The bulky cup nest is built in a tree or shrub, and the female incubates three, sometimes two, brown-blotched cream eggs for 14–15 days. This species has, on average, two broods per season. They appear to be territorial, as only one nesting pair is usually seen in an area. They rarely join mixed feeding flocks. The white-lined tanager's song is a fast repetitive cheeru.

=== Food and feeding ===
These are restless but unwary birds which eat a wide variety of fruit, especially epiphytes. They also take some nectar and insects, including beetles, ants, and grasshoppers.

Local names in Trinidad and Tobago include 'Parson' (for the male) and 'Singing Angel'; on these islands, the species is highly valued for its whistling ability.

== Gallery ==
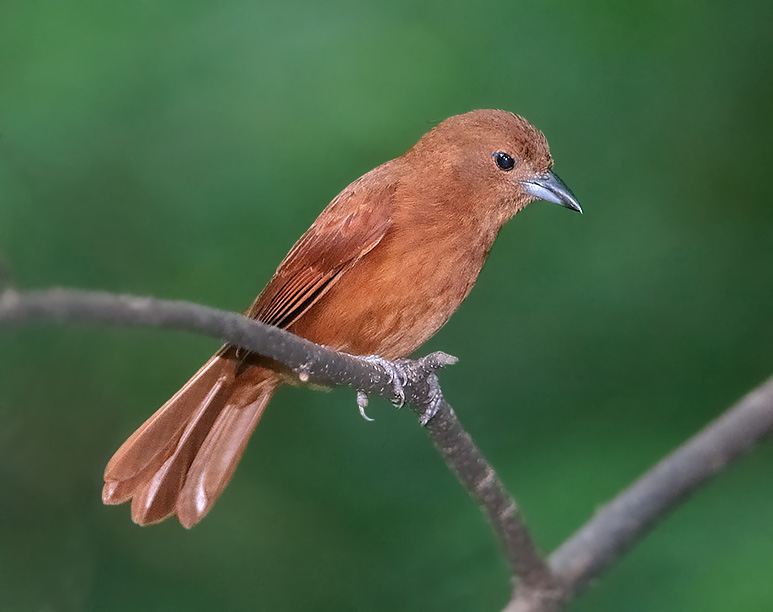
Female

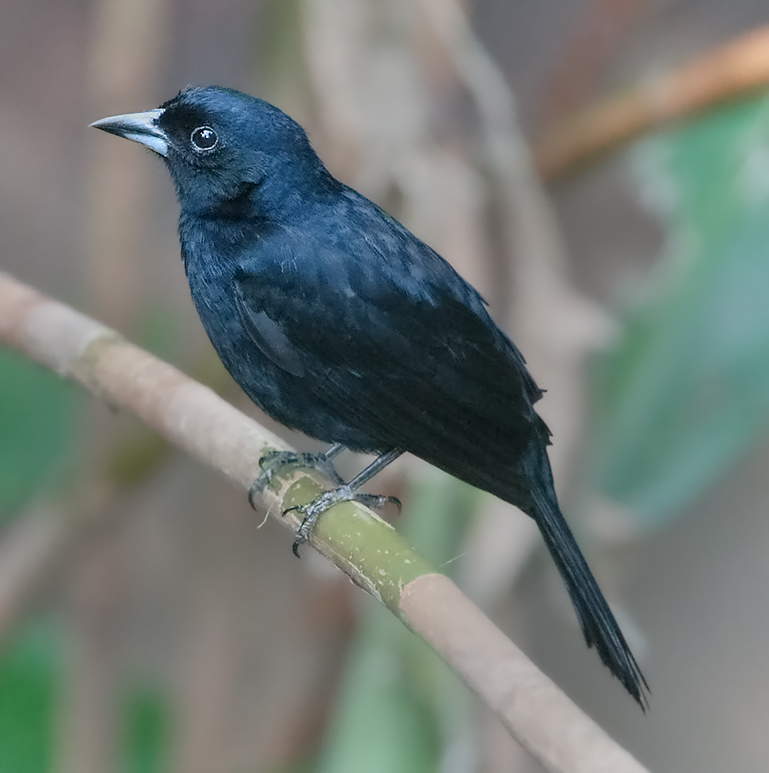
Male

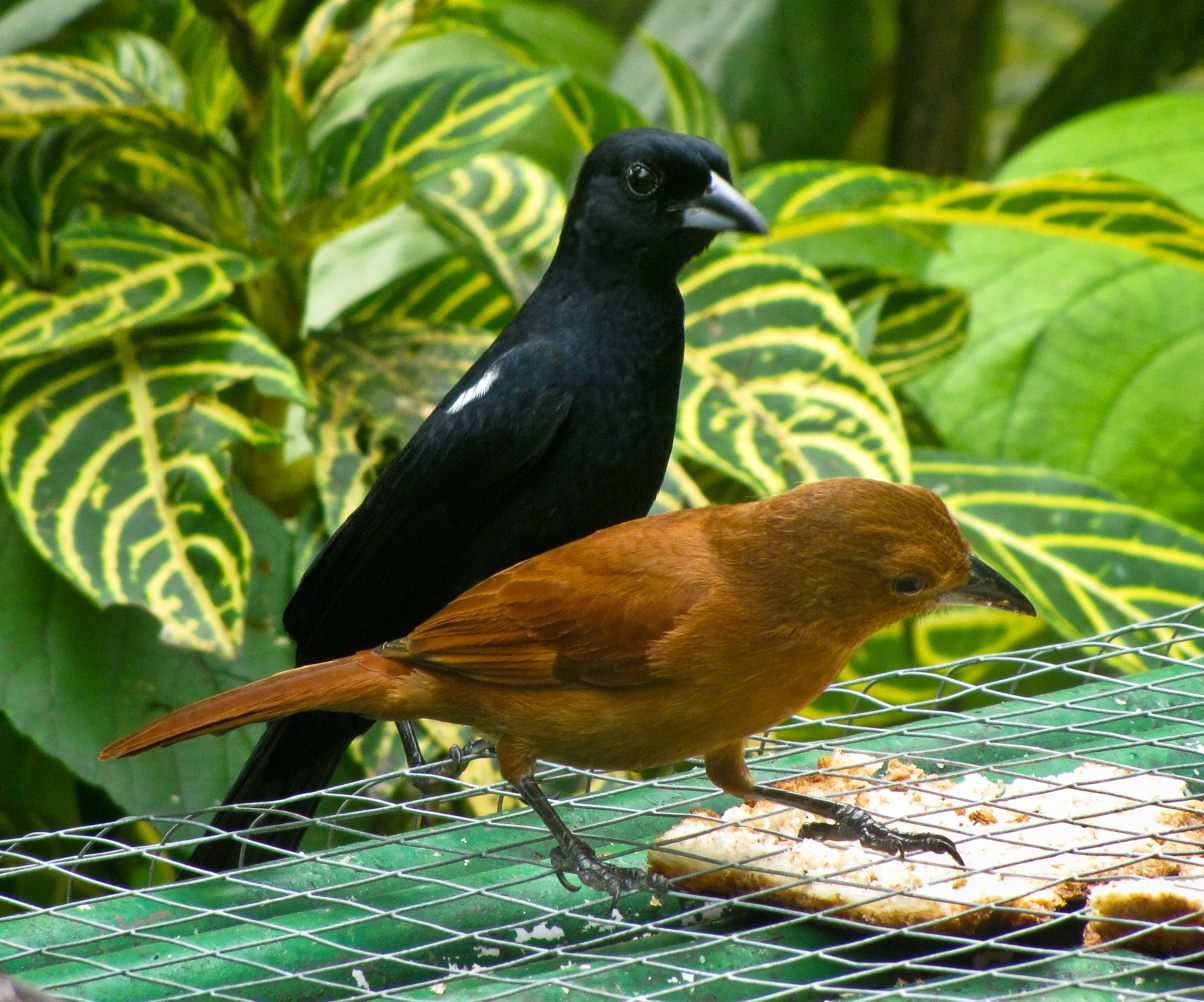
pair feeding at Asa Wright Nature Centre
