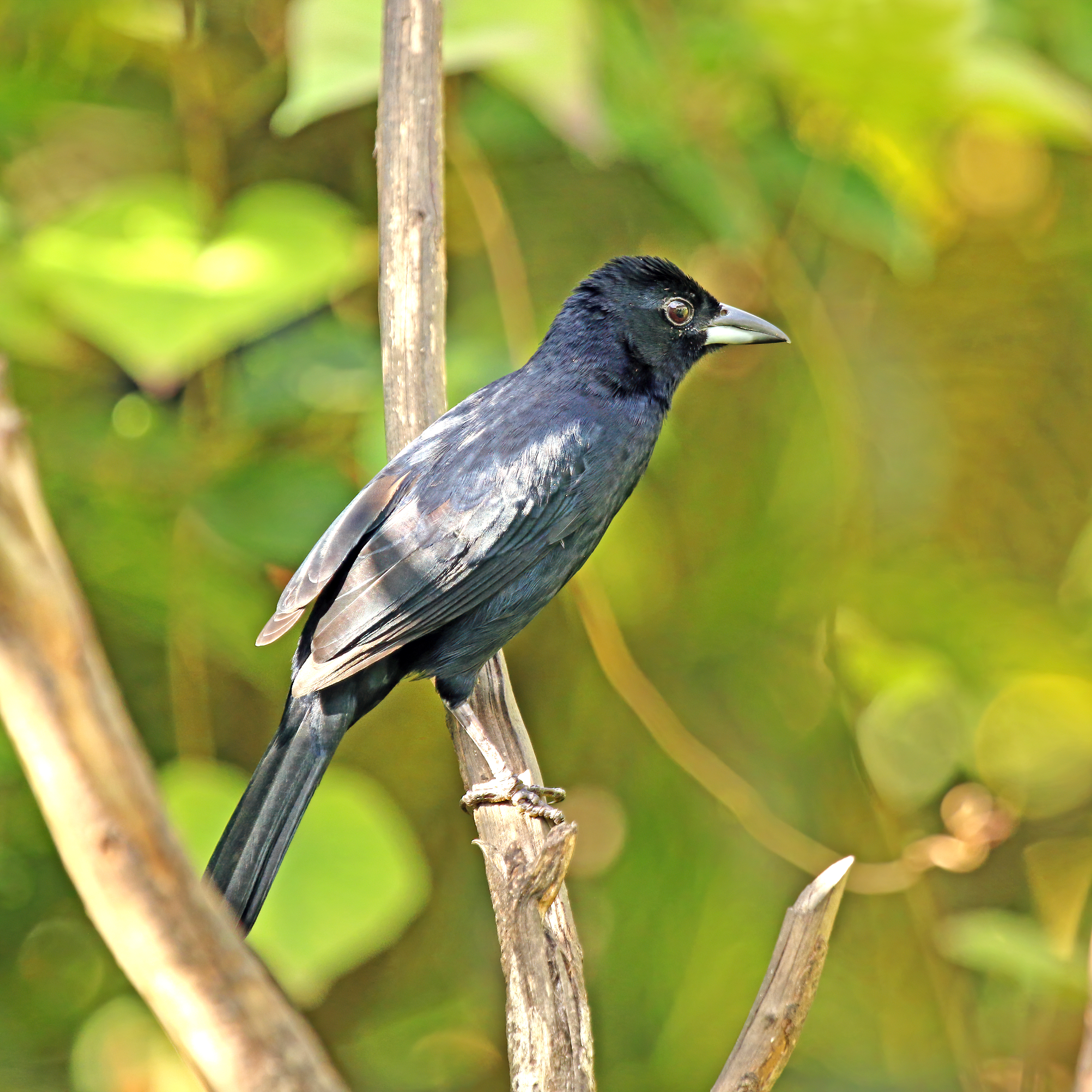
- male
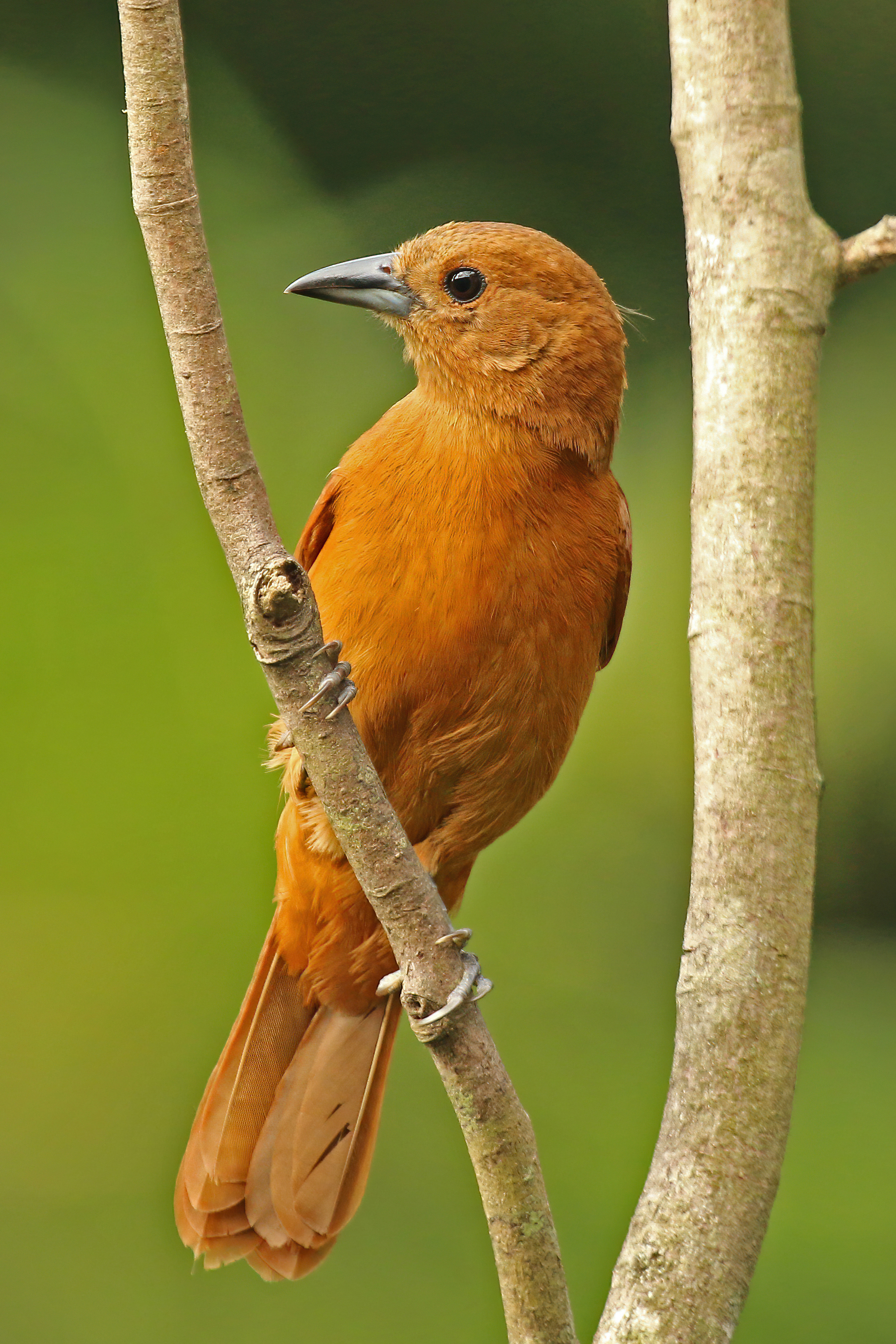
- female both t. rufus, Trinidad

Scientific classification
- Kingdom: Animalia
- Phylum: Chordata
- Class: Aves
- Order: Passeriformes
- Family: Thraupidae
- Genus: Tachyphonus; Vieillot, 1816

Type species
- Tanagra rufa Boddaert, 1783

Species
- See list

= Tachyphonus =

Genus of birds

Tachyphonus is a genus of birds in the tanager family Thraupidae.

The genus was introduced by the French ornithologist Louis Pierre Vieillot in 1816 with the white-lined tanager as the type species. The name combines the Ancient Greek words takhus "fast" and phōneō "to speak".

== Taxonomy ==
A molecular phylogenetic study of the tanager family published in 2014 indicated that the genus as defined here is polyphyletic and paraphyletic relative to Lanio and Rhodospingus.

The genus includes the following five species:

Genus Tachyphonus – Vieillot, 1816 – five species
Common name	Scientific name and subspecies	Range	Size and ecology	IUCN status and estimated population
Fulvous-crested tanager Male Female	Tachyphonus surinamus (Linnaeus, 1766)	Brazil, Colombia, Ecuador, French Guiana, Guyana, Peru, Suriname, and Venezuela.	Size: Habitat: Diet:	LC
Tawny-crested tanager Male	Tachyphonus delatrii Lafresnaye, 1847	Colombia, Costa Rica, Ecuador, Honduras, Nicaragua, and Panama.	Size: Habitat: Diet:	LC
Ruby-crowned tanager Male Female	Tachyphonus coronatus (Vieillot, 1822)	southern areas of Brazil and the Atlantic Forest.	Size: Habitat: Diet:	LC
White-lined tanager Male Female	Tachyphonus rufus (Boddaert, 1783)	Costa Rica south to northern Argentina, and on the islands of Trinidad and Tobago	Size: Habitat: Diet:	LC
Red-shouldered tanager Male Female	Tachyphonus phoenicius Swainson, 1838	Bolivia, Brazil, Colombia, Ecuador, French Guiana, Guyana, Peru, Suriname, and Venezuela.	Size: Habitat: Diet:	LC
