= Feliks Paweł Jarocki =

Polish zoologist and entomologist

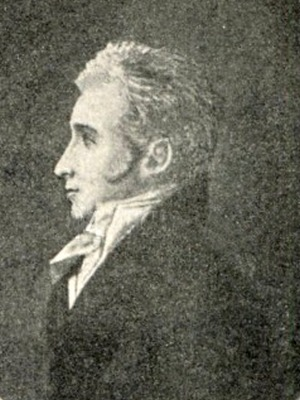
- Feliks Jarocki
- Born: 14 January 1790; Pacanów, Busko County, Poland
- Died: 25 March 1865 (aged 75); Warsaw
- Known for: Zoologia czyli zwierzętopismo ogólne podług naynowszego systemu ułożone (Zoology, or General Treatise on Animals, Arranged According to the Latest System), 1821
- Scientific career
- Fields: Zoology, entomology
- Workplaces: Zoological Cabinet of the Royal University of Warsaw

Feliks Paweł Jarocki (Pacanów, 14 January 1790 – 25 March 1865, Warsaw) was a Polish zoologist and entomologist.

== Life ==
Jarocki was a Doctor of Liberal Arts and Philosophy. He organized and managed the Zoological Cabinet of the Royal University of Warsaw from 1819 to 1862. The collection was based on that of Baron Sylwiusz Minckwitz, which included over 20,000 specimens. Jarocki built up this collection through purchases and scientific expeditions to eastern Poland. He also acquired many important books for the zoological library. When he retired the zoological collection included 65,690 specimens, and the library had 2,000 volumes. He was succeeded as curator by Władysław Taczanowski.

Jarocki was the author of Zoologia czyli zwierzętopismo ogólne podług naynowszego systemu ułożone (1821).

In September 1828 he accompanied the 18-year-old Chopin to Berlin as a family friend of the Chopin’s. Jarocki met Felix Mendelssohn and Gaspare Spontini but Chopin was scared and shy to approach them.
