= List of birds of French Guiana =

This is a list of the bird species recorded in French Guiana. The avifauna of French Guiana has 737 confirmed species, of which one is endemic. Two have been introduced by humans and 84 are rare or vagrants. An additional 15 species are unconfirmed (see below).

Except as an entry is cited otherwise, the list of species is that of the South American Classification Committee (SACC). The list's taxonomic treatment (designation and sequence of orders, families, and species) and nomenclature (common and scientific names) are also those of the SACC unless noted otherwise. Capitalization within English names follows Wikipedia practice, i.e. only the first word of a name is capitalized unless a place name such as São Paulo is used.

The following tags have been used to highlight certain categories of occurrence.

- (V) Vagrant - a species that rarely or accidentally occurs in French Guiana
- (E) Endemic - a species endemic to French Guiana
- (I) Introduced - a species introduced to French Guiana as a consequence, direct or indirect, of human actions
- (U) Unconfirmed - a species recorded but with "no tangible evidence" according to the SACC

== Tinamous ==
Order: Tinamiformes Family: Tinamidae

The tinamous are one of the most ancient groups of bird. Although they look similar to other ground-dwelling birds like quail and grouse, they have no close relatives and are classified as a single family, Tinamidae, within their own order, the Tinamiformes. Eight species have been recorded in French Guiana.

- Great tinamou, Tinamus major
- Cinereous tinamou, Crypturellus cinereus
- Little tinamou, Crypturellus soui
- Red-legged tinamou, Crypturellus erythropus
- Variegated tinamou, Crypturellus variegatus
- Rusty tinamou, Crypturellus brevirostris

== Screamers ==
Order: Anseriformes Family: Anhimidae

The screamers are a small family of birds related to the ducks. They are large, bulky birds, with a small downy head, long legs, and large feet which are only partially webbed. They have large spurs on their wings which are used in fights over mates and in territorial disputes. One species has been recorded in French Guiana.

- Horned screamer, Anhima cornuta (V)

== Ducks ==
Order: Anseriformes Family: Anatidae

Anatidae includes the ducks and most duck-like waterfowl, such as geese and swans. These birds are adapted to an aquatic existence with webbed feet, flattened bills, and feathers that are excellent at shedding water due to an oily coating. Fifteen species have been recorded in French Guiana.

- Fulvous whistling-duck, Dendrocygna bicolor (V)
- White-faced whistling-duck, Dendrocygna viduata (V)
- Black-bellied whistling-duck, Dendrocygna autumnalis
- Orinoco goose, Oressochen jubatus (V)
- Muscovy duck, Cairina moschata
- Comb duck, Sarkidiornis sylvicola (V)
- Northern shoveler, Spatula clypeata (V)
- Blue-winged teal, Spatula discors
- American wigeon, Mareca americana (V)
- White-cheeked pintail, Anas bahamensis
- Northern pintail, Anas acuta (V)
- Green-winged teal, Anas crecca (V)
- Ring-necked duck, Aythya collaris (V)
- Lesser scaup, Aythya affinis
- Masked duck, Nomonyx dominicus

== Guans ==
Order: Galliformes Family: Cracidae

The Cracidae are large birds, similar in general appearance to turkeys. The guans and curassows live in trees, but the smaller chachalacas are found in more open scrubby habitats. They are generally dull-plumaged, but the curassows and some guans have colorful facial ornaments. Four species have been recorded in French Guiana.

- Marail guan, Penelope marail
- Blue-throated piping-guan, Pipile cumanensis
- Variable chachalaca, Ortalis motmot
- Black curassow, Crax alector

== New World quails ==
Order: Galliformes Family: Odontophoridae

The New World quails are small, plump terrestrial birds only distantly related to the quails of the Old World, but named for their similar appearance and habits. Two species have been recorded in French Guiana.

- Crested bobwhite, Colinus cristatus (U)
- Marbled wood-quail, Odontophorus gujanensis

== Flamingos ==
Order: Phoenicopteriformes Family: Phoenicopteridae

Flamingos are gregarious wading birds, usually 3 to 5 feet (0.9 to 1.5 m) tall, found in both the Western and Eastern Hemispheres. Flamingos filter-feed on shellfish and algae. Their oddly shaped beaks are specially adapted to separate mud and silt from the food they consume and, uniquely, are used upside-down. One species has been recorded in French Guiana.

- American flamingo, Phoenicopterus ruber

== Grebes ==
Order: Podicipediformes Family: Podicipedidae

Grebes are small to medium-large freshwater diving birds. They have lobed toes and are excellent swimmers and divers. However, they have their feet placed far back on the body, making them quite ungainly on land. Two species have been recorded in French Guiana.

- Least grebe, Tachybaptus dominicus
- Pied-billed grebe, Podilymbus podiceps

== Pigeons ==
Order: Columbiformes Family: Columbidae

Pigeons and doves are stout-bodied birds with short necks and short slender bills with a fleshy cere. Thirteen species have been recorded in French Guiana.

- Rock pigeon, Columba livia (I)
- Scaled pigeon, Patagioenas speciosa
- Pale-vented pigeon, Patagioenas cayennensis
- Plumbeous pigeon, Patagioenas plumbea
- Ruddy pigeon, Patagioenas subvinacea
- Ruddy quail-dove, Geotrygon montana
- White-tipped dove, Leptotila verreauxi
- Gray-fronted dove, Leptotila rufaxilla
- Eared dove, Zenaida auriculata
- Blue ground dove, Claravis pretiosa
- Common ground dove, Columbina passerina
- Plain-breasted ground dove, Columbina minuta
- Ruddy ground dove, Columbina talpacoti

== Cuckoos ==
Order: Cuculiformes Family: Cuculidae

The family Cuculidae includes cuckoos, roadrunners, and anis. These birds are of variable size with slender bodies, long tails and strong legs. Eleven species have been recorded in French Guiana.

- Greater ani, Crotophaga major
- Smooth-billed ani, Crotophaga ani
- Striped cuckoo, Tapera naevia
- Pavonine cuckoo, Dromococcyx pavoninus
- Little cuckoo, Coccycua minuta
- Squirrel cuckoo, Piaya cayana
- Black-bellied cuckoo, Piaya melanogaster
- Dark-billed cuckoo, Coccyzus melacoryphus
- Yellow-billed cuckoo, Coccyzus americanus
- Pearly-breasted cuckoo, Coccyzus euleri
- Mangrove cuckoo, Coccyzus minor

== Oilbird ==
Order: Steatornithiformes Family: Steatornithidae

The oilbird is a slim, long-winged bird related to the nightjars. It is nocturnal and a specialist feeder on the fruit of the oil palm.

- Oilbird, Steatornis caripensis

== Potoos ==
Order: Nyctibiiformes Family: Nyctibiidae

The potoos (sometimes called poor-me-ones) are large near passerine birds related to the nightjars and frogmouths. They are nocturnal insectivores which lack the bristles around the mouth found in the true nightjars. Five species have been recorded in French Guiana.

- Rufous potoo, Phyllaemulor bracteatus
- Great potoo, Nyctibius grandis
- Long-tailed potoo, Nyctibius aethereus
- Common potoo, Nyctibius griseus
- White-winged potoo, Nyctibius leucopterus

== Nightjars ==
Order: Caprimulgiformes Family: Caprimulgidae

Nightjars are medium-sized nocturnal birds that usually nest on the ground. They have long wings, short legs and very short bills. Most have small feet, of little use for walking, and long pointed wings. Their soft plumage is camouflaged to resemble bark or leaves. Eleven species have been recorded in French Guiana.

- Nacunda nighthawk, Chordeiles nacunda
- Lesser nighthawk, Chordeiles acutipennis
- Band-tailed nighthawk, Nyctiprogne leucopyga
- Short-tailed nighthawk, Lurocalis semitorquatus
- Blackish nightjar, Nyctipolus nigrescens
- Common pauraque, Nyctidromus albicollis
- Cayenne nightjar, Setopagis maculosa (E)
- White-tailed nightjar, Hydropsalis cayennensis
- Spot-tailed nightjar, Hydropsalis maculicaudus
- Ladder-tailed nightjar, Hydropsalis climacocerca
- Rufous nightjar, Antrostomus rufus

== Swifts ==
Order: Apodiformes Family: Apodidae

Swifts are small birds which spend the majority of their lives flying. These birds have very short legs and never settle voluntarily on the ground, perching instead only on vertical surfaces. Many swifts have long swept-back wings which resemble a crescent or boomerang. Twelve species have been recorded in French Guiana.

- White-chinned swift, Cypseloides cryptus
- Black swift, Cypseloides niger (V)
- White-collared swift, Streptoprocne zonaris
- Band-rumped swift, Chaetura spinicaudus
- Chapman's swift, Chaetura chapmani
- Sick's swift, Chaetura meridionalis (V)
- Short-tailed swift, Chaetura brachyura
- White-tipped swift, Aeronautes montivagus
- Fork-tailed palm-swift, Tachornis squamata
- Lesser swallow-tailed swift, Panyptila cayennensis
- Common swift, Apus apus (V)
- Alpine swift, Tachymarptis melba (V)(U, not on the SACC list)

== Hummingbirds ==
Order: Apodiformes Family: Trochilidae

Hummingbirds are small birds capable of hovering in mid-air due to the rapid flapping of their wings. They are the only birds that can fly backwards. Thirty-two species have been recorded in French Guiana.

- Crimson topaz, Topaza pella
- White-necked jacobin, Florisuga mellivora
- Rufous-breasted hermit, Glaucis hirsutus
- Sooty barbthroat, Threnetes niger
- Little hermit, Phaethornis longuemareus
- Reddish hermit, Phaethornis ruber
- Sooty-capped hermit, Phaethornis augusti
- Straight-billed hermit, Phaethornis bourcieri
- Long-tailed hermit, Phaethornis superciliosus
- Great-billed hermit, Phaethornis malaris
- Brown violetear, Colibri delphinae
- Black-eared fairy, Heliothryx auritus
- White-tailed goldenthroat, Polytmus guainumbi
- Green-tailed goldenthroat, Polytmus theresiae
- Fiery-tailed awlbill, Avocettula recurvirostris
- Ruby-topaz hummingbird, Chrysolampis mosquitus
- Green-throated mango, Anthracothorax viridigula
- Black-throated mango, Anthracothorax nigricollis
- Racket-tipped thorntail, Discosura longicaudus
- Tufted coquette, Lophornis ornatus
- Long-billed starthroat, Heliomaster longirostris (U)
- Amethyst woodstar, Calliphlox amethystina
- Blue-tailed emerald, Chlorostilbon mellisugus
- Blue-chinned sapphire, Chlorestes notata
- Gray-breasted sabrewing, Campylopterus largipennis
- Fork-tailed woodnymph, Thalurania furcata
- Plain-bellied emerald, Chrysuronia leucogaster
- White-chested emerald, Chrysuronia brevirostris
- Glittering-throated emerald, Chionomesa fimbriata
- Green-bellied hummingbird, Saucerottia viridigaster
- Rufous-throated sapphire, Hylocharis sapphirina
- White-chinned sapphire, Chlorestes cyanus

== Hoatzin ==
Order: Opisthocomiformes Family: Opisthocomidae

The Hoatzin is pheasant-sized, but much slimmer. It has a long tail and neck, but a small head with an unfeathered blue face and red eyes which are topped by a spiky crest. It is a weak flier which is found in the swamps of the Amazon and Orinoco rivers.

- Hoatzin, Opisthocomus hoazin

== Limpkin ==
Order: Gruiformes Family: Aramidae

The limpkin resembles a large rail. It has drab-brown plumage and a grayer head and neck.

- Limpkin, Aramus guarauna

== Trumpeters ==
Order: Gruiformes Family: Psophiidae

The trumpeters are dumpy birds with long necks and legs and chicken-like bills. They are named for the trumpeting call of the males. One species has been recorded in French Guiana.

- Gray-winged trumpeter, Psophia crepitans

== Rails ==
Order: Gruiformes Family: Rallidae

Rallidae is a large family of small to medium-sized birds which includes the rails, crakes, coots, and gallinules. Typically they inhabit dense vegetation in damp environments near lakes, swamps, or rivers. In general they are shy and secretive birds, making them difficult to observe. Most species have strong legs and long toes which are well adapted to soft uneven surfaces. They tend to have short, rounded wings and to be weak fliers. Sixteen species have been recorded in French Guiana.

- Mangrove rail, Rallus longirostris
- Purple gallinule, Porphyrio martinica
- Azure gallinule, Porphyrio flavirostris
- Russet-crowned crake, Anurolimnas viridis
- Rufous-sided crake, Laterallus melanophaius
- Gray-breasted crake, Laterallus exilis
- Ocellated crake, Micropygia schomburgkii
- Ash-throated crake, Mustelirallus albicollis
- Paint-billed crake, Mustelirallus erythrops
- Spotted rail, Pardirallus maculatus
- Little wood-rail, Aramides mangle
- Gray-cowled wood-rail, Aramides cajaneus
- Rufous-necked wood-rail, Aramides axillaris
- Uniform crake, Amaurolimnas concolor
- Yellow-breasted crake, Hapalocrex flaviventer
- Common gallinule, Gallinula galeata

== Finfoots ==
Order: Gruiformes Family: Heliornithidae

Heliornithidae is a small family of tropical birds with webbed lobes on their feet similar to those of grebes and coots. One species has been recorded in French Guiana.

- Sungrebe, Heliornis fulica

== Plovers ==
Order: Charadriiformes Family: Charadriidae

The family Charadriidae includes the plovers, dotterels, and lapwings. They are small to medium-sized birds with compact bodies, short, thick necks, and long, usually pointed, wings. They are found in open country worldwide, mostly in habitats near water. Seven species have been recorded in French Guiana.

- Black-bellied plover, Pluvialis squatarola
- American golden-plover, Pluvialis dominica
- Pied lapwing, Hoploxypterus cayanus
- Semipalmated plover, Charadrius semipalmatus
- Southern lapwing, Vanellus chilensis (V)
- Wilson's plover, Anarynchus wilsonia
- Collared plover, Anarynchus collaris

== Oystercatchers ==
Order: Charadriiformes Family: Haematopodidae

The oystercatchers are large and noisy plover-like birds, with strong bills used for smashing or prising open molluscs. One species has been recorded in French Guiana.

- American oystercatcher, Haematopus palliatus (U)

== Avocets and stilts ==
Order: Charadriiformes Family: Recurvirostridae

Recurvirostridae is a family of large wading birds, which includes the avocets and stilts. The avocets have long legs and long up-curved bills. The stilts have extremely long legs and long, thin, straight bills. One species has been recorded in French Guiana.

- Black-necked stilt, Himantopus mexicanus

== Sandpipers ==
Order: Charadriiformes Family: Scolopacidae

Scolopacidae is a large diverse family of small to medium-sized shorebirds including the sandpipers, curlews, godwits, shanks, tattlers, woodcocks, snipes, dowitchers, and phalaropes. The majority of these species eat small invertebrates picked out of the mud or soil. Variation in length of legs and bills enables multiple species to feed in the same habitat, particularly on the coast, without direct competition for food. Thirty species have been recorded in French Guiana.

- Upland sandpiper, Bartramia longicauda
- Whimbrel, Numenius phaeopus
- Bar-tailed godwit, Limosa lapponica (V)
- Hudsonian godwit, Limosa haemastica
- Marbled godwit, Limosa fedoa (V)
- Ruddy turnstone, Arenaria interpres
- Red knot, Calidris canutus
- Ruff, Calidris pugnax
- Stilt sandpiper, Calidris himantopus
- Curlew sandpiper, Calidris ferruginea (U)
- Sanderling, Calidris alba
- Dunlin, Calidris alpina (V)
- Least sandpiper, Calidris minutilla
- White-rumped sandpiper, Calidris fuscicollis
- Buff-breasted sandpiper, Calidris subruficollis
- Pectoral sandpiper, Calidris melanotos
- Semipalmated sandpiper, Calidris pusilla
- Western sandpiper, Calidris mauri
- Short-billed dowitcher, Limnodromus griseus
- Long-billed dowitcher, Limnodromus scolopaceus (V)
- Giant snipe, Gallinago undulata
- Pantanal snipe, Gallinago paraguaiae
- Terek sandpiper, Xenus cinereus (V)
- Spotted sandpiper, Actitis macularius
- Solitary sandpiper, Tringa solitaria
- Common greenshank, Tringa nebularia (V)
- Greater yellowlegs, Tringa melanoleuca
- Willet, Tringa semipalmata
- Lesser yellowlegs, Tringa flavipes
- Wood sandpiper, Tringa glareola (V)

== Jacanas ==
Order: Charadriiformes Family: Jacanidae

The jacanas are a family of waders found throughout the tropics. They are identifiable by their huge feet and claws which enable them to walk on floating vegetation in the shallow lakes that are their preferred habitat. One species has been recorded in French Guiana.

- Wattled jacana, Jacana jacana

== Skuas ==
Order: Charadriiformes Family: Stercorariidae

The family Stercorariidae are, in general, medium to large birds, typically with gray or brown plumage, often with white markings on the wings. They nest on the ground in temperate and arctic regions and are long-distance migrants. Five species have been recorded in French Guiana.

- Great skua, Stercorarius skua (V)
- South polar skua, Stercorarius maccormicki
- Pomarine jaeger, Stercorarius pomarinus
- Parasitic jaeger, Stercorarius parasiticus
- Long-tailed jaeger, Stercorarius longicaudus

== Gulls ==
Order: Charadriiformes Family: Laridae

Laridae is a family of medium to large seabirds and includes gulls, kittiwakes, terns, and skimmers. Gulls are typically gray or white, often with black markings on the head or wings. They have longish bills and webbed feet. Terns are a group of generally medium to large seabirds typically with gray or white plumage, often with black markings on the head. Most terns hunt fish by diving but some pick insects off the surface of fresh water. Terns are generally long-lived birds, with several species known to live in excess 30 years. Twenty-nine species of Laridae have been recorded in French Guiana.

- Brown noddy, Anous stolidus
- Black skimmer, Rynchops niger
- Black-legged kittiwake, Rissa tridactyla (U)
- Sabine's gull, Xema sabini (V)
- Gray-hooded gull, Chroicocephalus cirrocephalus (V)
- Black-headed gull, Chroicocephalus ridibundus (V)
- Little gull, Hydrocoloeus minutus (V)
- Laughing gull, Leucophaeus atricilla
- Franklin's gull, Leucophaeus pipixcan (V)
- Audouin's gull, Ichthyaetus auduoinii (V)
- Great black-backed gull, Larus marinus (V)
- Kelp gull, Larus dominicanus (V)
- Lesser black-backed gull, Larus fuscus
- Herring gull, Larus argentatus (V)
- Sooty tern, Onychoprion fuscata
- Bridled tern, Onychoprion anaethetus (V)
- Least tern, Sterula antillarum
- Yellow-billed tern, Sternula superciliaris
- Large-billed tern, Phaetusa simplex
- Gull-billed tern, Gelochelidon nilotica
- Black tern, Chlidonias niger
- White-winged tern, Chlidonias leucopterus (V)
- Common tern, Sterna hirundo
- Roseate tern, Sterna dougallii
- Arctic tern, Sterna paradisaea
- Elegant tern, Thalasseus elegans (V)
- Sandwich tern, Thalasseus sandvicensis
- Royal tern, Thalasseus maximus

== Sunbittern ==
Order: Eurypygiformes Family: Eurypygidae

The sunbittern is a bittern-like bird of tropical regions of the Americas and the sole member of the family Eurypygidae (sometimes spelled Eurypigidae) and genus Eurypyga.

- Sunbittern, Eurypyga helias

== Tropicbirds ==
Order: Phaethontiformes Family: Phaethontidae

Tropicbirds are slender white birds of tropical oceans, with exceptionally long central tail feathers. Their heads and long wings have black markings. One species has been recorded in French Guiana.

- Red-billed tropicbird, Phaethon aethereus

== Albatrosses ==
Order: Procellariiformes Family: Diomedeidae

The albatrosses are among the largest of flying birds, and the great albatrosses from the genus Diomedea have the largest wingspans of any extant birds. One species has been recorded in French Guiana.

- Yellow-nosed albatross, Thalassarche chlororhynchos (V)

== Southern storm-petrels ==
Order: Procellariiformes Family: Oceanitidae

The storm-petrels are the smallest seabirds, relatives of the petrels, feeding on planktonic crustaceans and small fish picked from the surface, typically while hovering. The flight is fluttering and sometimes bat-like. Until 2018, this family's species were included with the other storm-petrels in family Hydrobatidae. Two species have been recorded in French Guiana.

- Black-bellied storm-petrel, Fregetta tropica (V)
- Wilson's storm-petrel, Oceanites oceanicus

== Northern storm-petrels ==
Order: Procellariiformes Family: Hydrobatidae

Though the members of this family are similar in many respects to the southern storm-petrels, including their general appearance and habits, there are enough genetic differences to warrant their placement in a separate family. Two species have been recorded in French Guiana.

- Band-rumped storm-petrel, Hydrobates castro (V)
- Leach's storm-petrel, Hydrobates leucorhous

== Shearwaters ==
Order: Procellariiformes Family: Procellariidae

The procellariids are the main group of medium-sized "true petrels", characterized by united nostrils with medium septum and a long outer functional primary. Eight species have been recorded in French Guiana.

- Trindade petrel, Pterodroma arminjoniana (V)
- Fea's petrel, Pterodroma feae (V)
- Bulwer's petrel, Bulweria bulwerii (V)
- Cory's shearwater, Calonectris diomedea
- Sooty shearwater, Ardenna grisea (V)
- Great shearwater, Ardenna gravis
- Manx shearwater, Puffinus puffinus
- Audubon's shearwater, Puffinus lherminieri

== Storks ==
Order: Ciconiiformes Family: Ciconiidae

Storks are large, long-legged, long-necked, wading birds with long, stout bills. Storks are mute, but bill-clattering is an important mode of communication at the nest. Their nests can be large and may be reused for many years. Many species are migratory. Three species have been recorded in French Guiana.

- Maguari stork, Ciconia maguari
- Jabiru, Jabiru mycteria
- Wood stork, Mycteria americana

== Frigatebirds ==
Order: Suliformes Family: Fregatidae

Frigatebirds are large seabirds usually found over tropical oceans. They are large, black-and-white or completely black, with long wings and deeply forked tails. The males have colored inflatable throat pouches. They do not swim or walk and cannot take off from a flat surface. Having the largest wingspan-to-body-weight ratio of any bird, they are essentially aerial, able to stay aloft for more than a week. One species has been recorded in French Guiana.

- Magnificent frigatebird, Fregata magnificens

== Boobies ==
Order: Suliformes Family: Sulidae

The sulids comprise the gannets and boobies. Both groups are medium to large coastal seabirds that plunge-dive for fish. Three species have been recorded in French Guiana.

- Masked booby, Sula dactylatra
- Red-footed booby, Sula sula (V)
- Brown booby, Sula leucogaster

== Anhingas ==
Order: Suliformes Family: Anhingidae

Anhingas are often called "snake-birds" because of their long thin neck, which gives a snake-like appearance when they swim with their bodies submerged. The males have black and dark-brown plumage, an erectile crest on the nape, and a larger bill than the female. The females have much paler plumage especially on the neck and underparts. The darters have completely webbed feet and their legs are short and set far back on the body. Their plumage is somewhat permeable, like that of cormorants, and they spread their wings to dry after diving. One species has been recorded in French Guiana.

- Anhinga, Anhinga anhinga

== Cormorants ==
Order: Suliformes Family: Phalacrocoracidae

Phalacrocoracidae is a family of medium to large coastal, fish-eating seabirds that includes cormorants and shags. Plumage coloration varies, with the majority having mainly dark plumage, some species being black-and-white, and a few being colorful. One species has been recorded in French Guiana.

- Neotropic cormorant, Phalacrocorax brasilianus

== Pelicans ==
Order: Pelecaniformes Family: Pelecanidae

Pelicans are large water birds with a distinctive pouch under their beak. As with other members of the order Pelecaniformes, they have webbed feet with four toes. One species has been recorded in French Guiana.

- Brown pelican, Pelecanus occidentalis

== Herons ==
Order: Pelecaniformes Family: Ardeidae

The family Ardeidae contains the bitterns, herons, and egrets. Herons and egrets are medium to large wading birds with long necks and legs. Bitterns tend to be shorter necked and more wary. Members of Ardeidae fly with their necks retracted, unlike other long-necked birds such as storks, ibises and spoonbills. Twenty-two species have been recorded in French Guiana.

- Rufescent tiger-heron, Tigrisoma lineatum
- Fasciated tiger-heron, Tigrisoma fasciatum
- Boat-billed heron, Cochlearius cochlearius
- Agami heron, Agamia agami
- Zigzag heron, Zebrilus undulatus
- Stripe-backed bittern, Ixobrychus involucris (V)
- Least bittern, Ixobrychus exilis
- Pinnated bittern, Botaurus pinnatus
- Capped heron, Pilherodius pileatus
- Little blue heron, Egretta caerulea
- Tricolored heron, Egretta tricolor
- Snowy egret, Egretta thula
- Little egret, Egretta garzetta (V)
- Yellow-crowned night-heron, Nyctanassa violacea
- Black-crowned night-heron, Nycticorax nycticorax
- Striated heron, Butorides striata
- Squacco heron, Ardeola ralloides (V)
- Cattle egret, Ardea ibis
- Great egret, Ardea alba
- Gray heron, Ardea cinerea (V)
- Cocoi heron, Ardea cocoi
- Purple heron, Ardea purpurea (V)

== Ibises ==
Order: Pelecaniformes Family: Threskiornithidae

Threskiornithidae is a family of large terrestrial and wading birds which includes the ibises and spoonbills. They have long, broad wings with 11 primary and about 20 secondary feathers. They are strong fliers and despite their size and weight, very capable soarers. Seven species have been recorded in French Guiana.

- White ibis, Eudocimus albus (V)
- Scarlet ibis, Eudocimus ruber
- Glossy ibis, Plegadis falcinellus
- Green ibis, Mesembrinibis cayennensis
- Bare-faced ibis, Phimosus infuscatus (V)
- Buff-necked ibis, Theristicus caudatus (V)
- Roseate spoonbill, Platalea ajaja

== New World vultures ==
Order: Cathartiformes Family: Cathartidae

The New World vultures are not closely related to Old World vultures, but superficially resemble them because of convergent evolution. Like the Old World vultures, they are scavengers. However, unlike Old World vultures, which find carcasses by sight, New World vultures have a good sense of smell with which they locate carrion. Five species have been recorded in French Guiana.

- King vulture, Sarcoramphus papa
- Black vulture, Coragyps atratus
- Turkey vulture, Cathartes aura
- Lesser yellow-headed vulture, Cathartes burrovianus
- Greater yellow-headed vulture, Cathartes melambrotus

== Osprey ==
Order: Accipitriformes Family: Pandionidae

The family Pandionidae contains only one species, the osprey. The osprey is a medium-large raptor which is a specialist fish-eater with a worldwide distribution.

- Osprey, Pandion haliaetus

== Hawks ==
Order: Accipitriformes Family: Accipitridae

Accipitridae is a family of birds of prey, which includes hawks, eagles, kites, harriers, and Old World vultures. These birds have powerful hooked beaks for tearing flesh from their prey, strong legs, powerful talons, and keen eyesight. Thirty-four species have been recorded in French Guiana.

- Pearl kite, Gampsonyx swainsonii (V)
- White-tailed kite, Elanus leucurus (V)
- Hook-billed kite, Chondrohierax uncinatus
- Gray-headed kite, Leptodon cayanensis
- Swallow-tailed kite, Elanoides forficatus
- Crested eagle, Morphnus guianensis
- Harpy eagle, Harpia harpyja
- Black hawk-eagle, Spizaetus tyrannus
- Black-and-white hawk-eagle, Spizaetus melanoleucus
- Ornate hawk-eagle, Spizaetus ornatus
- Black-collared hawk, Busarellus nigricollis
- Snail kite, Rostrhamus sociabilis
- Slender-billed kite, Helicolestes hamatus
- Double-toothed kite, Harpagus bidentatus
- Rufous-thighed kite, Harpagus diodon (V)
- Plumbeous kite, Ictinia plumbea
- Gray-bellied hawk, Accipiter poliogaster
- Bicolored hawk, Astur bicolor
- Long-winged harrier, Circus buffoni
- Tiny hawk, Microspizias superciliosus
- Black kite, Milvus migrans (V)
- Crane hawk, Geranospiza caerulescens
- Slate-colored hawk, Buteogallus schistaceus
- Rufous crab hawk, Buteogallus aequinoctialis
- Savanna hawk, Buteogallus meridionalis
- Great black hawk, Buteogallus urubitinga
- Roadside hawk, Rupornis magnirostris
- White-tailed hawk, Geranoaetus albicaudatus
- White hawk, Pseudastur albicollis
- Black-faced hawk, Leucopternis melanops
- Gray-lined hawk, Buteo nitidus
- Broad-winged hawk, Buteo platypterus
- Short-tailed hawk, Buteo brachyurus
- Zone-tailed hawk, Buteo albonotatus

== Barn owls ==
Order: Strigiformes Family: Tytonidae

barn owls are medium to large owls with large heads and characteristic heart-shaped faces. They have long strong legs with powerful talons. One species has been recorded in French Guiana.

- American barn owl, Tyto furcata

== Owls ==
Order: Strigiformes Family: Strigidae

The typical owls are small to large solitary nocturnal birds of prey. They have large forward-facing eyes and ears, a hawk-like beak, and a conspicuous circle of feathers around each eye called a facial disk. Twelve species have been recorded in French Guiana.

- Tropical screech-owl, Megascops choliba
- Foothill screech-owl, Megascops roraimae
- Tawny-bellied screech-owl, Megascops watsonii
- Crested owl, Lophostrix cristata
- Spectacled owl, Pulsatrix perspicillata
- Tropical horned owl, Bubo nacurutu
- Mottled owl, Strix virgata
- Black-banded owl, Strix huhula
- Amazonian pygmy-owl, Glaucidium hardyi
- Burrowing owl, Athene cunicularia
- Striped owl, Asio clamator
- Short-eared owl, Asio flammeus (V)

== Trogons ==
Order: Trogoniformes Family: Trogonidae

The family Trogonidae includes trogons and quetzals. Found in tropical woodlands worldwide, they feed on insects and fruit, and their broad bills and weak legs reflect their diet and arboreal habits. Although their flight is fast, they are reluctant to fly any distance. Trogons have soft, often colorful, feathers with distinctive male and female plumage. Five species have been recorded in French Guiana.

- Black-tailed trogon, Trogon melanurus
- Green-backed trogon, Trogon viridis
- Guianan violaceous-trogon, Trogon violaceus
- Amazonian black-throated trogon, Trogon rufus
- Collared trogon, Trogon collaris

== Motmots ==
Order: Coraciiformes Family: Momotidae

The motmots have colorful plumage and long, graduated tails which they display by waggling back and forth. In most of the species, the barbs near the ends of the two longest (central) tail feathers are weak and fall off, leaving a length of bare shaft and creating a racket-shaped tail. One species has been recorded in French Guiana.

- Amazonian motmot, Momotus momota

== Kingfishers ==
Order: Coraciiformes Family: Alcedinidae

Kingfishers are medium-sized birds with large heads, long pointed bills, short legs, and stubby tails. Six species have been recorded in French Guiana.

- Ringed kingfisher, Megaceryle torquata
- Belted kingfisher, Megaceryle alcyon (V)
- Amazon kingfisher, Chloroceryle amazona
- American pygmy kingfisher, Chloroceryle aenea
- Green kingfisher, Chloroceryle americana
- Green-and-rufous kingfisher, Chloroceryle inda

== Jacamars ==
Order: Galbuliformes Family: Galbulidae

The jacamars are near passerine birds from tropical South America, with a range that extends up to Mexico. They feed on insects caught on the wing, and are glossy, elegant birds with long bills and tails. In appearance and behavior they resemble the Old World bee-eaters, although they are more closely related to puffbirds. Six species have been recorded in French Guiana.

- Brown jacamar, Brachygalba lugubris
- Yellow-billed jacamar, Galbula albirostris
- Green-tailed jacamar, Galbula galbula
- Bronzy jacamar, Galbula leucogastra
- Paradise jacamar, Galbula dea
- Great jacamar, Jacamerops aureus

== Puffbirds ==
Order: Galbuliformes Family: Bucconidae

The puffbirds are related to the jacamars and have the same range, but lack the iridescent colors of that family. They are mainly brown, rufous, or gray, with large heads and flattened bills with hooked tips. The loose abundant plumage and short tails makes them look stout and puffy, giving rise to the English common name of the family. Eight species have been recorded in French Guiana.

- Guianan puffbird, Notharchus macrorhynchos
- Pied puffbird, Notharchus tectus
- Spotted puffbird, Bucco tamatia
- Collared puffbird, Bucco capensis
- White-chested puffbird, Malacoptila fusca
- Rusty-breasted nunlet, Nonnula rubecula
- Black nunbird, Monasa atra
- Swallow-winged puffbird, Chelidoptera tenebrosa

== New World barbets ==
Order: Piciformes Family: Capitonidae

The barbets are plump birds, with short necks and large heads. They get their name from the bristles which fringe their heavy bills. Most species are brightly colored. One species has been recorded in French Guiana.

- Black-spotted barbet, Capito niger

== Toucans ==
Order: Piciformes Family: Ramphastidae

Toucans are near passerine birds from the Neotropics. They are brightly marked and have enormous colorful bills which in some species amount to half their body length. Seven species have been recorded in French Guiana.

- Toco toucan, Ramphastos toco
- White-throated toucan, Ramphastos tucanus
- Channel-billed toucan, Ramphastos vitellinus
- Tepui toucanet, Aulacorhynchus whitelianus (U)
- Guianan toucanet, Selenidera piperivora
- Green aracari, Pteroglossus viridis
- Black-necked aracari, Pteroglossus aracari

== Woodpeckers ==
Order: Piciformes Family: Picidae

Woodpeckers are small to medium-sized birds with chisel-like beaks, short legs, stiff tails, and long tongues used for capturing insects. Some species have feet with two toes pointing forward and two backward, while several species have only three toes. Many woodpeckers have the habit of tapping noisily on tree trunks with their beaks. Eighteen species have been recorded in French Guiana.

- Golden-spangled piculet, Picumnus exilis
- Arrowhead piculet, Picumnus minutissimus (V)
- White-barred piculet, Picumnus cirratus
- White woodpecker, Melanerpes candidus
- Yellow-tufted woodpecker, Melanerpes cruentatus
- Golden-collared woodpecker, Dryobates cassini
- Little woodpecker, Dryobates passerinus
- Red-necked woodpecker, Campephilus rubricollis
- Crimson-crested woodpecker, Campephilus melanoleucos
- Lineated woodpecker, Dryocopus lineatus
- Ringed woodpecker, Celeus torquatus
- Variable woodpecker, Celeus undatus
- Cream-colored woodpecker, Celeus flavus
- Chestnut woodpecker, Celeus elegans
- Yellow-throated woodpecker, Piculus flavigula
- Golden-green woodpecker, Piculus chrysochloros
- Golden-olive woodpecker, Colaptes rubiginosus
- Spot-breasted woodpecker, Colaptes punctigula

== Falcons ==
Order: Falconiformes Family: Falconidae

Falconidae is a family of diurnal birds of prey. They differ from hawks, eagles, and kites in that they kill with their beaks instead of their talons. Fifteen species have been recorded in French Guiana.

- Laughing falcon, Herpetotheres cachinnans
- Barred forest-falcon, Micrastur ruficollis
- Lined forest-falcon, Micrastur gilvicollis
- Slaty-backed forest-falcon, Micrastur mirandollei
- Collared forest-falcon, Micrastur semitorquatus
- Crested caracara, Caracara plancus
- Red-throated caracara, Ibycter americanus
- Black caracara, Daptrius ater
- Yellow-headed caracara, Milvago chimachima
- Eurasian kestrel, Falco tinnunculus (V)
- Merlin, Falco columbarius
- Bat falcon, Falco rufigularis
- Orange-breasted falcon, Falco deiroleucus
- Aplomado falcon, Falco femoralis
- Peregrine falcon, Falco peregrinus

== New World and African parrots ==
Order: Psittaciformes Family: Psittacidae

Parrots are small to large birds with a characteristic curved beak. Their upper mandibles have slight mobility in the joint with the skull and they have a generally erect stance. All parrots are zygodactyl, having the four toes on each foot placed two at the front and two to the back. Twenty-four species have been recorded in French Guiana.

- Lilac-tailed parrotlet, Touit batavicus
- Sapphire-rumped parrotlet, Touit purpuratus
- Canary-winged parakeet, Brotogeris versicolurus (U)
- Golden-winged parakeet, Brotogeris chrysoptera
- Caica parrot, Pyrilia caica
- Dusky parrot, Pionus fuscus
- Blue-headed parrot, Pionus menstruus
- Short-tailed parrot, Graydidascalus brachyurus
- Blue-cheeked amazon, Amazona dufresniana
- Mealy amazon, Amazona farinosa
- Orange-winged amazon, Amazona amazonica
- Dusky-billed parrotlet, Forpus modestus (U) — French Guiana's rarities committee (Le Comité d'Homologation de Guyane) has accepted two records of this species.
- Green-rumped parrotlet, Forpus passerinus
- Black-headed parrot, Pionites melanocephalus
- Red-fan parrot, Deroptyus accipitrinus
- Painted parakeet, Pyrrhura picta
- Brown-throated parakeet, Eupsittula pertinax
- Red-bellied macaw, Orthopsittaca manilatus
- Blue-and-yellow macaw, Ara ararauna
- Chestnut-fronted macaw, Ara severus
- Scarlet macaw, Ara macao
- Red-and-green macaw, Ara chloropterus
- Red-shouldered macaw, Diopsittaca nobilis (V)
- White-eyed parakeet, Psittacara leucophthalmus

== Antbirds ==
Order: Passeriformes Family: Thamnophilidae

The antbirds are a large family of small passerine birds of subtropical and tropical Central and South America. They are forest birds which tend to feed on insects at or near the ground. A sizable minority of them specialize in following columns of army ants to eat small invertebrates that leave their hiding places to flee from the ants. Many species lack bright color; brown, black, and white are the dominant tones. Forty-two species have been recorded in French Guiana.

- Rufous-rumped antwren, Euchrepomis callinota
- Ash-winged antwren, Euchrepomis spodioptila
- Fasciated antshrike, Cymbilaimus lineatus
- Black-throated antshrike, Frederickena viridis
- Great antshrike, Taraba major
- Black-crested antshrike, Sakesphorus canadensis
- Barred antshrike, Thamnophilus doliatus
- Mouse-colored antshrike, Thamnophilus murinus
- Blackish-gray antshrike, Thamnophilus nigrocinereus
- Northern slaty-antshrike, Thamnophilus punctatus
- Band-tailed antshrike, Thamnophilus melanothorax
- Amazonian antshrike, Thamnophilus amazonicus
- Spot-tailed antwren, Herpsilochmus sticturus
- Todd's antwren, Herpsilochmus stictocephalus
- Dusky-throated antshrike, Thamnomanes ardesiacus
- Cinereous antshrike, Thamnomanes caesius
- Rufous-bellied antwren, Isleria guttata
- Spot-winged antshrike, Pygiptila stellaris (U)
- Brown-bellied stipplethroat, Epinecrophylla gutturalis
- Pygmy antwren, Myrmotherula brachyura
- Guianan streaked-antwren, Myrmotherula surinamensis
- White-flanked antwren, Myrmotherula axillaris
- Long-winged antwren, Myrmotherula longipennis
- Gray antwren, Myrmotherula menetriesii
- Dot-winged antwren, Microrhopias quixensis
- White-fringed antwren, Formicivora grisea
- Guianan warbling-antbird, Hypocnemis cantator
- Dusky antbird, Cercomacroides tyrannina
- Blackish antbird, Cercomacroides nigrescens
- Gray antbird, Cercomacra cinerascens
- White-browed antbird, Myrmoborus leucophrys
- Black-chinned antbird, Hypocnemoides melanopogon
- Silvered antbird, Sclateria naevia
- Black-headed antbird, Percnostola rufifrons
- Spot-winged antbird, Myrmelastes leucostigma
- Ferruginous-backed antbird, Myrmoderus ferrugineus
- Black-throated antbird, Myrmophylax atrothorax
- Wing-banded antbird, Myrmornis torquata
- White-plumed antbird, Pithys albifrons
- Rufous-throated antbird, Gymnopithys rufigula
- Spot-backed antbird, Hylophylax naevius
- Common scale-backed antbird, Willisornis poecilinotus

== Gnateaters ==
Order: Passeriformes Family: Conopophagidae

The gnateaters are round, short-tailed, and long-legged birds, which are closely related to the antbirds. One species has been recorded in French Guiana.

- Chestnut-belted gnateater, Conopophaga aurita

== Antpittas ==
Order: Passeriformes Family: Grallariidae

Antpittas resemble the true pittas with strong, longish legs, very short tails, and stout bills. Three species have been recorded in French Guiana.

- Variegated antpitta, Grallaria varia
- Spotted antpitta, Hylopezus macularius
- Thrush-like antpitta, Myrmothera campanisona

== Antthrushes ==
Order: Passeriformes Family: Formicariidae

Antthrushes resemble small rails. Two species have been recorded in French Guiana.

- Rufous-capped antthrush, Formicarius colma
- Black-faced antthrush, Formicarius analis

== Ovenbirds ==
Order: Passeriformes Family: Furnariidae

Ovenbirds comprise a large family of small sub-oscine passerine bird species found in Central and South America. They are a diverse group of insectivores which gets its name from the elaborate "oven-like" clay nests built by some species, although others build stick nests or nest in tunnels or clefts in rock. The woodcreepers are brownish birds which maintain an upright vertical posture, supported by their stiff tail vanes. They feed mainly on insects taken from tree trunks. Thirty-six species have been recorded in French Guiana.

- South American leaftosser, Sclerurus obscurior
- Short-billed leaftosser, Sclerurus rufigularis
- Black-tailed leaftosser, Sclerurus caudacutus
- Spot-throated woodcreeper, Certhiasomus stictolaemus
- Long-tailed woodcreeper, Deconychura longicauda
- White-chinned woodcreeper, Dendrocincla merula
- Plain-brown woodcreeper, Dendrocincla fuliginosa
- Wedge-billed woodcreeper, Glyphorynchus spirurus
- Cinnamon-throated woodcreeper, Dendrexetastes rufigula
- Long-billed woodcreeper, Nasica longirostris
- Amazonian barred-woodcreeper, Dendrocolaptes certhia
- Black-banded woodcreeper, Dendrocolaptes picumnus
- Red-billed woodcreeper, Hylexetastes perrotii
- Striped woodcreeper, Xiphorhynchus obsoletus
- Chestnut-rumped woodcreeper, Xiphorhynchus pardalotus
- Buff-throated woodcreeper, Xiphorhynchus guttatus
- Straight-billed woodcreeper, Dendroplex picus
- Curve-billed scythebill, Campylorhamphus procurvoides
- Guianan woodcreeper, Lepidocolaptes albolineatus
- Rufous-rumped foliage-gleaner, Neophilydor erythrocercum
- Slender-billed xenops, Xenops tenuirostris
- Amazonian plain-xenops, Xenops genibarbis
- Point-tailed palmcreeper, Berlepschia rikeri
- Rufous-tailed xenops, Microxenops milleri
- Cinnamon-rumped foliage-gleaner, Philydor pyrrhodes
- Rufous-tailed foliage-gleaner, Anabacerthia ruficaudata
- Ruddy foliage-gleaner, Clibanornis rubiginosus
- Chestnut-crowned foliage-gleaner, Automolus rufipileatus
- Buff-throated foliage-gleaner, Automolus ochrolaemus
- Olive-backed foliage-gleaner, Automolus infuscatus
- Speckled spinetail, Cranioleuca gutturata
- Yellow-chinned spinetail, Certhiaxis cinnamomeus
- White-bellied spinetail, Mazaria propinqua
- Plain-crowned spinetail, Synallaxis gujanensis
- McConnell's spinetail, Synallaxis macconnelli
- Pale-breasted spinetail, Synallaxis albescens

== Manakins ==
Order: Passeriformes Family: Pipridae

The manakins are a family of subtropical and tropical mainland Central and South America, and Trinidad and Tobago. They are compact forest birds, the males typically being brightly colored, although the females of most species are duller and usually green-plumaged. Manakins feed on small fruits, berries, and insects. Ten species have been recorded in French Guiana.

- Tiny tyrant-manakin, Tyranneutes virescens
- Saffron-crested tyrant-manakin, Neopelma chrysocephalum (V)
- Blue-backed manakin, Chiroxiphia pareola
- White-throated manakin, Corapipo gutturalis
- Black manakin, Xenopipo atronitens
- White-fronted manakin, Lepidothrix serena
- White-bearded manakin, Manacus manacus
- Crimson-hooded manakin, Pipra aureola
- White-crowned manakin, Pseudopipra pipra
- Golden-headed manakin, Ceratopipra erythrocephala

== Cotingas ==
Order: Passeriformes Family: Cotingidae

The cotingas are birds of forests or forest edges in tropical South America. Comparatively little is known about this diverse group, although all have broad bills with hooked tips, rounded wings, and strong legs. The males of many of the species are brightly colored or decorated with plumes or wattles. Eleven species have been recorded in French Guiana.

- Guianan red-cotinga, Phoenicircus carnifex
- Guianan cock-of-the-rock, Rupicola rupicola
- Crimson fruitcrow, Haematoderus militaris
- Purple-throated fruitcrow, Querula purpurata
- Capuchinbird, Perissocephalus tricolor
- Purple-breasted cotinga, Cotinga cotinga
- Spangled cotinga, Cotinga cayana
- Screaming piha, Lipaugus vociferans
- White bellbird, Procnias alba
- Pompadour cotinga, Xipholena punicea
- Bare-necked fruitcrow, Gymnoderus foetidus

== Tityras ==
Order: Passeriformes Family: Tityridae

Tityridae are suboscine passerine birds found in forest and woodland in the Neotropics. The species in this family were formerly spread over the families Tyrannidae, Pipridae, and Cotingidae. They are small to medium-sized birds. They do not have the sophisticated vocal capabilities of the songbirds. Most, but not all, have plain coloring. Eleven species have been recorded in French Guiana.

- Black-crowned tityra, Tityra inquisitor
- Black-tailed tityra, Tityra cayana
- Olivaceous schiffornis, Schiffornis olivacea
- Cinereous mourner, Laniocera hypopyrra
- Dusky purpletuft, Iodopleura fusca
- Green-backed becard, Pachyramphus viridis
- Cinereous becard, Pachyramphus rufus
- White-winged becard, Pachyramphus polychopterus
- Black-capped becard, Pachyramphus marginatus
- Glossy-backed becard, Pachyramphus surinamus
- Pink-throated becard, Pachyramphus minor

== Sharpbill ==
Order: Passeriformes Family: Oxyruncidae

The sharpbill is a small bird of dense forests in Central and South America. It feeds mostly on fruit but also eats insects.

- Sharpbill, Oxyruncus cristatus

== Royal flycatchers ==
Order: Passeriformes Family: Onychorhynchidae

In 2019 the SACC determined that these species, which were formerly considered tyrant flycatchers, belonged in their own family.

- Tropical royal-flycatcher, Onychorhynchus coronatus
- Ruddy-tailed flycatcher, Terenotriccus erythrurus
- Sulphur-rumped flycatcher, Myiobius barbatus

== Tyrant flycatchers ==
Order: Passeriformes Family: Tyrannidae

Tyrant flycatchers are passerine birds which occur throughout North and South America. They superficially resemble the Old World flycatchers, but are more robust and have stronger bills. They do not have the sophisticated vocal capabilities of the songbirds. Most, but not all, have plain coloring. As the name implies, most are insectivorous. Eighty-one species have been recorded in French Guiana.

- Wing-barred piprites, Piprites chloris
- Cinnamon manakin-tyrant, Neopipo cinnamomea
- Cinnamon-crested spadebill, Platyrinchus saturatus
- Golden-crowned spadebill, Platyrinchus coronatus
- White-crested spadebill, Platyrinchus platyrhynchos
- Ringed antpipit, Corythopis torquatus
- Olive-green tyrannulet, Phylloscartes virescens
- Ochre-bellied flycatcher, Mionectes oleagineus
- McConnell's flycatcher, Mionectes macconnelli
- Sepia-capped flycatcher, Leptopogon amaurocephalus
- Olivaceous flatbill, Rhynchocyclus olivaceus
- Yellow-margined flatbill, Tolmomyias assimilis
- Gray-crowned flatbill, Tolmomyias poliocephalus
- Yellow-breasted flatbill, Tolmomyias flaviventris
- Yellow-olive flatbill, Tolmomyias sulphurescens
- Short-tailed pygmy-tyrant, Myiornis ecaudatus
- Double-banded pygmy-tyrant, Lophotriccus vitiosus
- Helmeted pygmy-tyrant, Lophotriccus galeatus
- Boat-billed tody-tyrant, Hemitriccus josephinae
- White-eyed tody-tyrant, Hemitriccus zosterops
- Smoky-fronted tody-flycatcher, Poecilotriccus fumifrons
- Spotted tody-flycatcher, Todirostrum maculatum
- Common tody-flycatcher, Todirostrum cinereum
- Painted tody-flycatcher, Todirostrum pictum
- Cliff flycatcher, Hirundinea ferruginea
- Guianan tyrannulet, Zimmerius acer
- Pale-tipped tyrannulet, Inezia caudata
- Yellow-bellied elaenia, Elaenia flavogaster
- Small-billed elaenia, Elaenia parvirostris
- Plain-crested elaenia, Elaenia cristata
- Lesser elaenia, Elaenia chiriquensis
- Rufous-crowned elaenia, Elaenia ruficeps (V)
- Yellow-crowned tyrannulet, Tyrannulus elatus
- Forest elaenia, Myiopagis gaimardii
- Gray elaenia, Myiopagis caniceps
- Yellow-crowned elaenia, Myiopagis flavivertex
- Yellow tyrannulet, Capsiempis flaveola
- Sooty-headed tyrannulet, Phyllomyias griseiceps
- Amazonian beardless-tyrannulet, Camptostoma napaeum
- White-lored tyrannulet, Ornithion inerme
- Mouse-colored tyrannulet, Nesotriccus murinus
- Bearded tachuri, Polystictus pectoralis
- Crested doradito, Pseudocolopteryx sclateri (U)
- Cinnamon attila, Attila cinnamomeus
- Bright-rumped attila, Attila spadiceus
- Piratic flycatcher, Legatus leucophaius
- Rufous-tailed flatbill, Ramphotrigon ruficauda
- Great kiskadee, Pitangus sulphuratus
- Lesser kiskadee, Philohydor lictor
- Sulphury flycatcher, Tyrannopsis sulphurea
- Boat-billed flycatcher, Megarynchus pitangua
- Streaked flycatcher, Myiodynastes maculatus
- Rusty-margined flycatcher, Myiozetetes cayanensis
- Social flycatcher, Myiozetetes similis
- Dusky-chested flycatcher, Myiozetetes luteiventris
- Yellow-throated flycatcher, Conopias parvus
- Variegated flycatcher, Empidonomus varius
- Crowned slaty flycatcher, Empidonomus aurantioatrocristatus (V)
- White-throated kingbird, Tyrannus albogularis (V)
- Tropical kingbird, Tyrannus melancholicus
- Fork-tailed flycatcher, Tyrannus savana
- Eastern kingbird, Tyrannus tyrannus (V)
- Gray kingbird, Tyrannus dominicensis
- Grayish mourner, Rhytipterna simplex
- Pale-bellied mourner, Rhytipterna immunda (U)
- Todd's sirystes, Sirystes subcanescens
- Dusky-capped flycatcher, Myiarchus tuberculifer
- Short-crested flycatcher, Myiarchus ferox
- Brown-crested flycatcher, Myiarchus tyrannulus
- Long-tailed tyrant, Colonia colonus
- Bran-colored flycatcher, Myiophobus fasciatus
- Northern scrub-flycatcher, Sublegatus arenarum
- Amazonian scrub-flycatcher, Sublegatus obscurior
- Pied water-tyrant, Fluvicola pica
- White-headed marsh tyrant, Arundinicola leucocephala
- Fuscous flycatcher, Cnemotriccus fuscatus
- Euler's flycatcher, Lathrotriccus euleri
- Olive-sided flycatcher, Contopus cooperi
- Western wood-pewee, Contopus sordidulus (V)
- Tropical pewee, Contopus cinereus
- White-throated pewee, Contopus albogularis

== Vireos ==
Order: Passeriformes Family: Vireonidae

The vireos are a group of small to medium-sized passerine birds. They are typically greenish in color and resemble wood warblers apart from their heavier bills. Nine species have been recorded in French Guiana.

- Rufous-browed peppershrike, Cyclarhis gujanensis
- Ashy-headed greenlet, Hylophilus pectoralis
- Gray-chested greenlet, Hylophilus semicinereus
- Lemon-chested greenlet, Hylophilus thoracicus
- Slaty-capped shrike-vireo, Vireolanius leucotis
- Guianan brownlet, Tunchiornis luteifrons
- Buff-cheeked greenlet, Pachysylvia muscicapina
- Red-eyed vireo, Vireo olivaceus (V)
- Chivi vireo, Vireo chivi
- Black-whiskered vireo, Vireo altiloquus (V)

== Jays ==
Order: Passeriformes Family: Corvidae

The family Corvidae includes crows, ravens, jays, choughs, magpies, treepies, nutcrackers, and ground jays. Corvids are above average in size among the Passeriformes, and some of the larger species show high levels of intelligence. One species has been recorded in French Guiana.

- Cayenne jay, Cyanocorax cayanus

== Swallows ==
Order: Passeriformes Family: Hirundinidae

The family Hirundinidae is adapted to aerial feeding. They have a slender streamlined body, long pointed wings, and a short bill with a wide gape. The feet are adapted to perching rather than walking, and the front toes are partially joined at the base. Fourteen species have been recorded in French Guiana.

- Blue-and-white swallow, Pygochelidon cyanoleuca
- Black-collared swallow, Pygochelidon melanoleuca
- White-banded swallow, Atticora fasciata
- White-thighed swallow, Atticora tibialis
- Southern rough-winged swallow, Stelgidopteryx ruficollis
- Brown-chested martin, Progne tapera
- Purple martin, Progne subis
- Caribbean martin, Progne dominicensis (V)
- Gray-breasted martin, Progne chalybea
- Southern martin, Progne elegans
- White-winged swallow, Tachycineta albiventer
- Bank swallow, Riparia riparia
- Barn swallow, Hirundo rustica
- Cliff swallow, Petrochelidon pyrrhonota (U)

== Wrens ==
Order: Passeriformes Family: Troglodytidae

The wrens are mainly small and inconspicuous except for their loud songs. These birds have short wings and thin down-turned bills. Several species often hold their tails upright. All are insectivorous. Six species have been recorded in French Guiana.

- Wing-banded wren, Microcerculus bambla
- Southern house-wren, Troglodytes musculus
- Coraya wren, Pheugopedius coraya
- Buff-breasted wren, Cantorchilus leucotis
- White-breasted wood-wren, Henicorhina leucosticta
- Musician wren, Cyphorhinus arada

== Gnatcatchers ==
Order: Passeriformes Family: Polioptilidae

These dainty birds resemble Old World warblers in their build and habits, moving restlessly through the foliage seeking insects. The gnatcatchers and gnatwrens are mainly soft bluish gray in color and have the typical insectivore's long sharp bill. They are birds of fairly open woodland or scrub, which nest in bushes or trees. Four species have been recorded in French Guiana.

- Collared gnatwren, Microbates collaris
- Trilling gnatwren, Ramphocaenus melanurus
- Tropical gnatcatcher, Polioptila plumbea
- Guianan gnatcatcher, Polioptila guianensis

== Donacobius ==
Order: Passeriformes Family: Donacobiidae

The black-capped donacobius is found in wet habitats from Panama across northern South America and east of the Andes to Argentina and Paraguay.

- Black-capped donacobius, Donacobius atricapilla

== Thrushes ==
Order: Passeriformes Family: Turdidae

The thrushes are a group of passerine birds that occur mainly in the Old World. They are plump, soft plumaged, small to medium-sized insectivores or sometimes omnivores, often feeding on the ground. Many have attractive songs. Five species have been recorded in French Guiana.

- Gray-cheeked thrush, Catharus minimus
- Pale-breasted thrush, Turdus leucomelas
- Cocoa thrush, Turdus fumigatus
- Spectacled thrush, Turdus nudigenis
- Gray-flanked thrush, Turdus phaeopygus

== Old World flycatchers ==
Order: Passeriformes Family: Muscicapidae

The Old World flycatchers form a large family of small passerine birds. These are mainly small arboreal insectivores, many of which, as the name implies, take their prey on the wing.

- Northern wheatear, Oenanthe oenanthe (V)

== Mockingbirds ==
Order: Passeriformes Family: Mimidae

The mimids are a family of passerine birds that includes thrashers, mockingbirds, tremblers, and the New World catbirds. These birds are notable for their vocalizations, especially their ability to mimic a wide variety of birds and other sounds heard outdoors. Their coloring tends towards dull, grays and brown. One species has been recorded in French Guiana.

- Tropical mockingbird, Mimus gilvus

== Old World sparrows ==
Order: Passeriformes Family: Passeridae

Sparrows are small passerine birds. In general, sparrows tend to be small, plump, brown or gray birds with short tails and short powerful beaks. Sparrows are seed eaters, but they also consume small insects. One species has been recorded in French Guiana.

- House sparrow, Passer domesticus (I)

== Pipits and wagtails ==
Order: Passeriformes Family: Motacillidae

Motacillidae is a family of small passerine birds with medium to long tails. They include the wagtails, longclaws, and pipits. They are slender, ground feeding insectivores of open country. Two species have been recorded in French Guiana.

- White wagtail, Motacilla alba (V)
- Yellowish pipit, Anthus chii

== Finches ==
Order: Passeriformes Family: Fringillidae

Finches are seed-eating passerine birds, that are small to moderately large and have a strong beak, usually conical and in some species very large. All have twelve tail feathers and nine primaries. These birds have a bouncing flight with alternating bouts of flapping and gliding on closed wings, and most sing well. Eight species have been recorded in French Guiana.

- Golden-rumped euphonia, Chlorophonia cyanocephala
- Plumbeous euphonia, Euphonia plumbea (V)
- Purple-throated euphonia, Euphonia chlorotica (V)
- Finsch's euphonia, Euphonia finschi
- Golden-bellied euphonia, Euphonia chrysopasta
- White-vented euphonia, Euphonia minuta
- Violaceous euphonia, Euphonia violacea
- Golden-sided euphonia, Euphonia cayennensis

== Sparrows ==
Order: Passeriformes Family: Passerellidae

Most of the species are known as sparrows, but these birds are not closely related to the Old World sparrows which are in the family Passeridae. Many of these have distinctive head patterns. Three species have been recorded in French Guiana.

- Grassland sparrow, Ammodramus humeralis
- Pectoral sparrow, Arremon taciturnus
- Rufous-collared sparrow, Zonotrichia capensis

== Blackbirds ==
Order: Passeriformes Family: Icteridae

The icterids are a group of small to medium-sized, often colorful, passerine birds restricted to the New World and include the grackles, New World blackbirds and New World orioles. Most species have black as the predominant plumage color, often enlivened by yellow, orange, or red. Fourteen species have been recorded in French Guiana.

- Bobolink, Dolichonyx oryzivorus
- Eastern meadowlark, Sturnella magna
- Red-breasted meadowlark, Leistes militaris
- Green oropendola, Psarocolius viridis
- Crested oropendola, Psarocolius decumanus
- Yellow-rumped cacique, Cacicus cela
- Red-rumped cacique, Cacicus haemorrhous
- Epaulet oriole, Icterus cayanensis
- Baltimore oriole, Icterus galbula (V)
- Yellow oriole, Icterus nigrogularis
- Giant cowbird, Molothrus oryzivorus
- Shiny cowbird, Molothrus bonariensis
- Carib grackle, Quiscalus lugubris
- Yellow-hooded blackbird, Chrysomus icterocephalus

== Wood-warblers ==
Order: Passeriformes Family: Parulidae

The wood-warblers are a group of small, often colorful, passerine birds restricted to the New World. Most are arboreal, but some are terrestrial. Most members of this family are insectivores. Eleven species have been recorded in French Guiana.

- Northern waterthrush, Parkesia noveboracensis
- Black-and-white warbler, Mniotilta varia (V)
- Prothonotary warbler, Protonotaria citrea (V)
- Masked yellowthroat, Geothlypis aequinoctialis
- American redstart, Setophaga ruticilla
- Tropical parula, Setophaga pitiayumi
- Bay-breasted warbler, Setophaga castanea (V)
- Blackburnian warbler, Setophaga fusca
- Yellow warbler, Setophaga petechia
- Blackpoll warbler, Setophaga striata
- Riverbank warbler, Myiothlypis rivularis

== Mitrospingids ==
Order: Passeriformes Family: Mitrospingidae

Until 2017 the four species in this family were included in the family Thraupidae, the "true" tanagers.

- Red-billed pied tanager, Lamprospiza melanoleuca

== Cardinal grosbeaks ==
Order: Passeriformes Family: Cardinalidae

The cardinals are a family of robust, seed-eating birds with strong bills. They are typically associated with open woodland. The sexes usually have distinct plumages. Nine species have been recorded in French Guiana.

- Hepatic tanager, Piranga flava
- Summer tanager, Piranga rubra
- Scarlet tanager, Piranga olivacea (V)<
- Rose-breasted grosbeak, Pheucticus ludovicianus (U) — French Guiana's rarities committee (Le Comité d'Homologation de Guyane) has accepted four records of this species.
- Rose-breasted chat, Granatellus pelzelni
- Red-and-black grosbeak, Periporphyrus erythromelas
- Yellow-green grosbeak, Caryothraustes canadensis
- Amazonian grosbeak, Cyanoloxia rothschildii
- Dickcissel, Spiza americana (V)

== Tanagers ==
Order: Passeriformes Family: Thraupidae

The tanagers are a large group of small to medium-sized passerine birds restricted to the New World, mainly in the tropics. As a family they are omnivorous, but individual species specialize in eating fruits, seeds, insects, or other types of food. Most have short, rounded wings. Forty-nine species have been recorded in French Guiana.

- Blue-backed tanager, Cyanicterus cyanicterus
- Hooded tanager, Nemosia pileata
- Green honeycreeper, Chlorophanes spiza
- Guira tanager, Hemithraupis guira
- Yellow-backed tanager, Hemithraupis flavicollis
- Bicolored conebill, Conirostrum bicolor
- Chestnut-vented conebill, Conirostrum speciosum
- Grassland yellow-finch, Sicalis luteola (V)
- Blue-black grassquit, Volatinia jacarina
- Black-and-white tanager, Conothraupis speculigera (V)
- Flame-crested tanager, Loriotus cristatus
- White-shouldered tanager, Loriotus luctuosus
- Fulvous-crested tanager, Tachyphonus surinamus
- White-lined tanager, Tachyphonus rufus
- Red-shouldered tanager, Tachyphonus phoenicius
- Pileated finch, Coryphospingus pileatus (U)
- Silver-beaked tanager, Ramphocelus carbo
- Fulvous shrike-tanager, Lanio fulvus
- Purple honeycreeper, Cyanerpes caeruleus
- Red-legged honeycreeper, Cyanerpes cyaneus
- Swallow tanager, Tersina viridis
- Black-faced dacnis, Dacnis lineata
- Blue dacnis, Dacnis cayana
- Lesson's seedeater, Sporophila bouvronides
- Lined seedeater, Sporophila lineola
- White-bellied seedeater, Sporophila leucoptera (V)
- Chestnut-bellied seedeater, Sporophila castaneiventris
- Ruddy-breasted seedeater, Sporophila minuta
- Copper seedeater, Sporophila bouvreuil (V)
- Chestnut-bellied seed-finch, Sporophila angolensis
- Large-billed seed-finch, Sporophila crassirostris
- Gray seedeater, Sporophila intermedia (V)
- Wing-barred seedeater, Sporophila americana
- Yellow-bellied seedeater, Sporophila nigricollis
- Plumbeous seedeater, Sporophila plumbea
- Buff-throated saltator, Saltator maximus
- Olive-gray saltator, Saltator olivascens
- Slate-colored grosbeak, Saltator grossus
- Wedge-tailed grass-finch, Emberizoides herbicola
- Bananaquit, Coereba flaveola
- Red-capped cardinal, Paroaria gularis
- Black-faced tanager, Schistochlamys melanopis
- Burnished-buff tanager, Stilpnia cayana
- Turquoise tanager, Tangara mexicana
- Paradise tanager, Tangara chilensis
- Opal-rumped tanager, Tangara velia
- Bay-headed tanager, Tangara gyrola
- Blue-gray tanager, Thraupis episcopus
- Palm tanager, Thraupis palmarum
- Dotted tanager, Ixothraupis varia
- Speckled tanager, Ixothraupis guttata (U) — French Guiana's rarities committee (Le Comité d'Homologation de Guyane) has accepted three records of this species.
- Spotted tanager, Ixothraupis punctata

== See also ==
- List of birds
- Lists of birds by region
