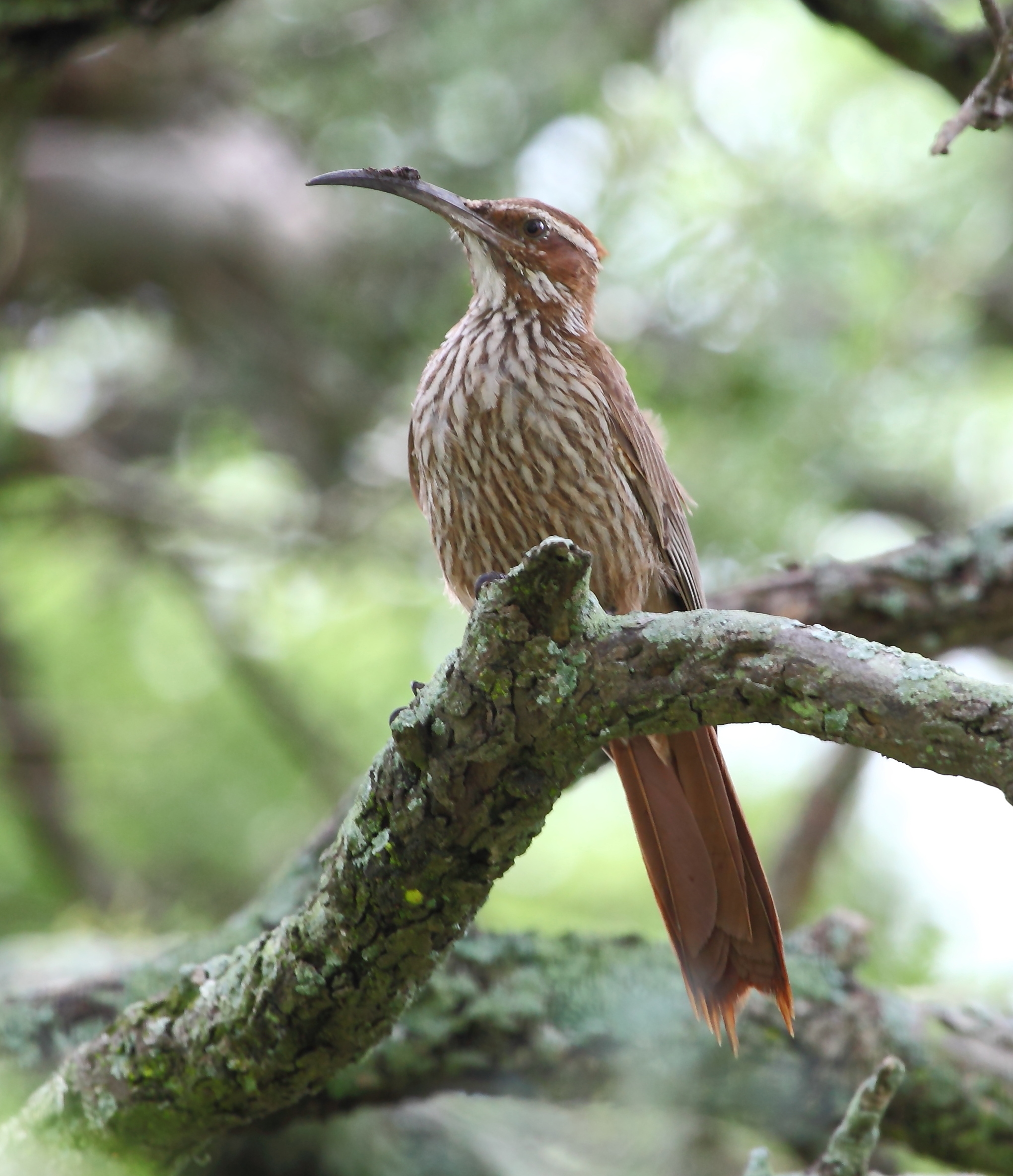
- At Santa Fe Province, Argentina

Conservation status
- Least Concern (IUCN 3.1)

Scientific classification
- Kingdom: Animalia
- Phylum: Chordata
- Class: Aves
- Order: Passeriformes
- Family: Furnariidae
- Subfamily: Dendrocolaptinae
- Genus: Drymornis; Eyton, 1852
- Species: D. bridgesii

Binomial name
- Drymornis bridgesii (Eyton, 1849)

= Scimitar-billed woodcreeper =

Species of bird

The scimitar-billed woodcreeper (Drymornis bridgesii) is a species of bird in the subfamily Dendrocolaptinae of the ovenbird family Furnariidae. It is found in Argentina, Bolivia, Brazil, Paraguay, and Uruguay.

== Taxonomy and systematics ==
The scimitar-billed woodcreeper is most closely related to the greater scythebill (Drymotoxeres pucheranii). It is the only member of its genus and is monotypic: No subspecies are recognized.

== Description ==
The scimitar-billed woodcreeper is 26 to 35 cm (10 to 14 in) long and weighs 76 to 110 g (2.7 to 3.9 oz). It is a large woodcreeper with a relatively short tail and a long decurved bill. The sexes have the same plumage. Adults have dark rufous ear coverts and a white supercilium and moustachial stripe. Their forehead, crown, and nape are rufous to dark brown, with the nape being slightly lighter with white flecks. Their back, scapulars, and most wing coverts are cinnamon-brown to reddish brown. Their rump, uppertail coverts, and tail are rufous. Their greater primary coverts and flight feathers are darker brown than the back. Their throat is white. Their underparts are reddish brown with bold white streaks that narrow through the belly onto the undertail coverts. The streaks have dark brown edges. Their iris is yellowish or light grayish brown to dark brown, their bill brownish or black with a pinkish base to the mandible, and their legs and feet horn, gray, or dull black. Juveniles have dark and light chestnut streaks on the neck and less well defined streaks than adults on the underparts.

== Distribution and habitat ==
The scimitar-billed woodcreeper is found in extreme southeastern Bolivia, western Paraguay, the Brazilian state of Rio Grande do Sul, and through Uruguay south to north-central Argentina. It inhabits the Gran Chaco, Pampas, and Argentine Espinal ecoregions, where it occurs in woodlands, scrublands, thorn forest, and savanna. It also occurs in abandoned pastures and fragmentary woodlands in agricultural areas. In most areas it reaches an elevation of only 500 m (1,600 ft) but in parts of Argentina reaches 1,350 m (4,400 ft).

== Behavior ==
=== Movement ===
The scimitar-billed woodcreeper is believed to be a year-round resident throughout its range, though some post-breeding dispersal is postulated.

=== Feeding ===
The scimitar-billed woodcreeper is unique among woodcreepers by foraging mainly on the ground. It does, however, also forage on trees and cacti. Its diet is varied and includes arthropods, other invertebrates like snails, many kinds of vertebrates including frogs, snakes, lizards, and nestling birds, and reptile and bird eggs. It captures some prey by probing into the ground, bromeliads, and holes in trees and cacti, and other prey by grabbing it from the ground surface. It typically forages singly or in pairs. It has been observed in small groups as well, sometimes with other bird species.

=== Breeding ===
The scimitar-billed woodcreeper breeds between September and December. It nests in cavities in trees and palms, usually natural ones but also those excavated by woodpeckers, and has been observed using old nests of the rufous hornero (Furnarius rufus). It lines the bottom of the cavity with leaves and bark or wood chips. The clutch size is typically three eggs. The incubation period is about 14 days and fledging occurs about 21 days after hatch. Both sexes build the nest, incubate the eggs, and care for the nestlings.

=== Vocalization ===
The scimitar-billed woodcreeper's song is a "downslurred, decelerating series of upslurred whistled notes...tweedle tweedle tweed twee twee". It also sings "an almost level series of overslurred whistled notes...jli jli jli jli jli". Its calls include "sik, tsis-sik, or tsis-sik-sik" and a thrice-repeated "cheedle". Pairs sometimes sing in duet.

== Status ==
The IUCN has assessed the scimitar-billed woodcreeper as being of Least Concern. It has a fairly large range, and though its population size is not known it is believed to be stable. No immediate threats have been identified. "Considering that Scimitar-billed Woodcreeper has been classified as an area-sensitive species that could become extinct in smaller fragments, as well as a species sensitive to vegetation structure conditions within patches and to forest fragmentation, further studies are needed to establish its specific habitat requirements throughout its range."
