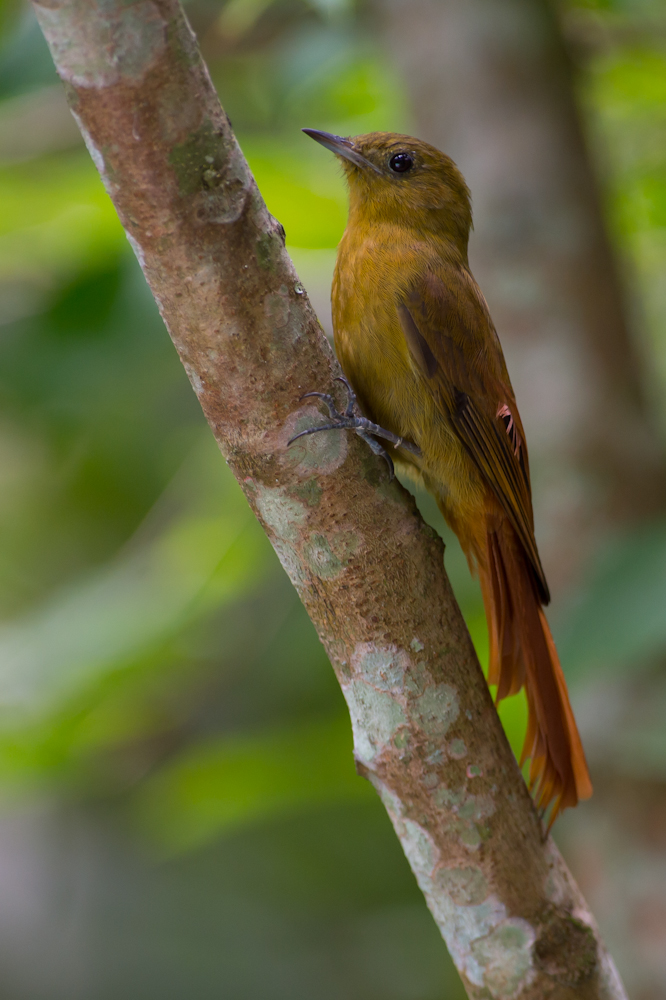

Conservation status
- Least Concern (IUCN 3.1)

- Least Concern (IUCN 3.1)

Scientific classification
- Kingdom: Animalia
- Phylum: Chordata
- Class: Aves
- Order: Passeriformes
- Family: Furnariidae
- Subfamily: Dendrocolaptinae
- Genus: Sittasomus; Swainson, 1827
- Species: S. griseicapillus

Binomial name
- Sittasomus griseicapillus (Vieillot, 1818)

= Olivaceous woodcreeper =

Species of bird

The olivaceous woodcreeper (Sittasomus griseicapillus) is a passerine bird in subfamily Dendrocolaptinae of the ovenbird family Furnariidae. It is found from central Mexico south through every Central American country, on the island of Tobago, and in every mainland South American country except Chile, French Guiana, and Suriname.

== Taxonomy and systematics ==
The olivaceous woodcreeper is the only member of genus Sittasomus. However, taxonomic systems vary in their treatment of the taxon, with some splitting it into two species. The International Ornithological Committee and the Clements taxonomy assign these 15 subspecies to the olivaceous woodcreeper; Clements distributes them among five groups.

"Grayish" group

- S. g. jaliscensis Nelson, 1900
- S. g. gracileus Bangs & Peters, J.L., 1928
- S. g. sylvioides Lafresnaye, 1850
- S. g. perijanus Phelps, W.H. & Gilliard, 1940
- S. g. tachirensis Phelps, W.H. & Phelps, W.H. Jr., 1956
- S. g. griseus Jardine, 1847

"Pacific"

- S. g. aequatorialis Ridgway, 1891

"Amazonian" group

- S. g. amazonus Lafresnaye, 1850
- S. g. axillaris Zimmer, J.T., 1934
- S. g. viridis Carriker, 1935
- S. g. transitivus Pinto & Camargo, 1948
- S. g. griseicapillus (Vieillot, 1818)

"Reiser's"

- S. g. reiseri Hellmayr, 1917

"Olivaceous" group

- S. g. olivaceus Wied-Neuwied, M., 1831
- S. g. sylviellus (Temminck, 1821)

BirdLife International's Handbook of the Birds of the World (HBW) splits the olivaceous woodcreeper into two species. It retains the eight "Amazonian", "Reiser's", and "Olivaceous" subspecies as S. griseicapillus but with the English name "eastern olivaceous woodcreeper". It places the seven "grayish" and "Pacific" subspecies in S. griseus with the English name "western olivaceous woodcreeper".

The North American and South American Classification Committees of the American Ornithological Society treat the olivaceous woodcreeper as one species but note that it probably consists of several species, perhaps as many as five corresponding to the Clements groups.

The olivaceous woodcreeper is genetically most closely related to the long-tailed woodcreeper (Deconychura longicauda).

== Description ==
The olivaceous woodcreeper is one of the smallest members of its subfamily. It has a slim body and a short straight bill, and unlike most other woodcreepers has no streaks or spots. The sexes' plumages are alike but females average smaller than males. Adults are 13.1 to 19.3 cm (5.2 to 7.6 in) long. Males weigh 9.0 to 18.0 g (0.32 to 0.63 oz) and females 8.6 to 16.0 g (0.30 to 0.56 oz). Length and weight vary geographically. All subspecies have a dark iris, a dark gray to black maxilla, a black to light gray mandible with a darker tip, and gray, bluish gray, or black legs and feet.

The nominate subspecies S. g. griseicapillus is mostly olivaceous, with an olive-brown hindcrown and rufous rump, tail, and flight feathers. Its vent area is grayish and its flanks buff. In flight the wing shows a tawny band. The other members of the "Amazonian" subspecies group are similar but differ from it thus:

- S. g. amazonus: darker and grayer, whitish "wingpits", and more rufescent tail and flight feathers
- S. g. axillaris: a more rufescent back, ochraceous "wingpits", and more rufescent flight feathers
- S. g. viridis: a more olive-green back and a paler, more yellowish green, vent area
- S. g. transitivus: grayer and with a cinnamon wing band

The six subspecies of the "grayish" group are mostly olive but with a contrasting brown back. Their wings and tail are rufous. The subspecies vary somewhat with the olive parts tending in some to gray, the brown back in some being somewhat reddish or a deeper brown, and the wing band varying among whitish, buff, or tawny.

The two subspecies of the "olivaceous" group are overall olive-yellow, with deep rufous tails and flight feathers. S. g. sylviellus tends to mustard yellow and S. g. olivaceus is more olive. The "Pacific" subspecies S. g. aequatorialis is similar to the "grayish" group but has a browner back and pale tawny tail and flight feathers. "Reiser's" subspecies S. g. reiseri has a cinnamon-brown hindcrown, head, and mantle. Its tail and flight feathers are pale but rich rufous, its "wingpits" ochraceous, its flanks cinnamon, and its vent area cinnamon-buff.

== Distribution and habitat ==
The subspecies of the olivaceous woodcreeper are found thus:

- S. g. jaliscensis, Mexico north of the Isthmus of Tehuantepec
- S. g. gracileus, Mexico's Yucatan Peninsula, northern Guatemala, and northern Belize
- S. g. sylvioides, Mexico south of the Isthmus of Tehuantepec and south through Central America into northwestern Colombia
- S. g. perijanus, northeastern Colombia and northwestern Venezuela
- S. g. tachirensis, northern Colombia and western Venezuela
- S. g. griseus, Tobago and Venezuela's eastern Andes and coastal mountain ranges
- S. g. aequatorialis, the Pacific slope from western Ecuador south into northwestern Peru
- S. g. amazonus, western Amazon Basin of southeastern Colombia, southern Venezuela, eastern Ecuador and Peru, and western Brazil east to the Negro and Madeira rivers
- S. g. axillaris, northeastern Amazon Basin of southwestern Venezuela east to Guyana and south in Brazil to the Amazon River
- S. g. viridis, Amazon Basin in Bolivia
- S. g. transitivus, Amazonian Brazil south of the Amazon River, east of the Rio Tapajós south into Mato Grosso
- S. g. griseicapillus, southeastern Bolivia east across central Brazil and south through Paraguay into north-central Argentina
- S. g. reiseri, northeastern Brazil
- S. g. olivaceus, southeastern Bahia state in eastern Brazil
- S. g. sylviellus, southeastern and southern Brazil, southeastern Paraguay, and northeastern Argentina and Uruguay

The olivaceous woodcreeper inhabits a variety of wooded landscapes, generally favoring all parts of mature forest but also occurring in secondary forest and plantations. Mature landscapes include rainforest, semi-deciduous forest, terra firme and várzea forests, evergreen montane forest, cloudforest, and gallery forest. In drier areas it occurs in scrublands, caatinga, and cerrado. It has also been recorded in stands of bamboo, pine forest, mangroves, coffee plantations, and urban parks.

The olivaceous woodcreeper inhabits a range of elevations. In northern Central America it occurs from sea level to 1,950 m (6,400 ft). Subspecies S. g. axillaris is fairly common between 1,200 and 1,400 m (3,900 and 4,600 ft) and is found as low as 850 m (2,800 ft). In Colombia it occurs below 2,000 m (6,600 ft) and in Ecuador mostly below 1,100 m (3,600 ft) but as high as 2,000 m (6,600 ft). It reaches as high as 2,300 m (7,500 ft) in northern Venezuela, Bolivia, and southeastern Brazil.

== Behavior ==
=== Movement ===
The olivaceous woodcreeper is a year-round resident throughout its range.

=== Feeding ===
The olivaceous woodcreeper's diet is mostly arthropods but also includes seeds, fruit, and small vertebrates. In much of its range adult and larval beetles dominate its diet but in some areas ants and other Hymenoptera were the most often consumed. It forages by hitching up tree trunks and along branches and vines, mostly from the forest's mid-level to the subcanopy but sometimes in the understory. It has been documented following army ant swarms in Mexico, Central America, and southeastern Brazil but not in Amazonia. It often forages singly but also in pairs, and frequently joins mixed-species feeding flocks. In some places (e.g. in the Serra de Paranapiacaba of Brazil), they may even form a core species of such flocks. The species is known to associate with foraging groups of tamarins (Leontopithecus sp.) to snatch prey startled by the monkeys. They can also be occasionally seen catching flying prey like termites in mid-air.

=== Breeding ===
The olivaceous woodcreeper's breeding season varies geographically, from mid-March to June in Middle America and northern South America to between August and October in southern Amazonia. The species nests in cavities, either natural or those previously used by woodpeckers, but it is not known to excavate its own. Few nests have been studied; one in Costa Rica was lined with dead leaves. The clutch size is two or three eggs. Limited data suggest that most incubation and care of nestlings is by the female, though at least one instance of feeding by both parents has been noted. The incubation period and time to fledging are not known.

=== Vocalization ===
The olivaceous woodcreeper's vocalizations vary widely across the subspecies. There are at least six song types and can be sorted into two groups. Subspecies in Middle America, northern South America, and west of the Andes make "a rapid staccato trill or thin rattle". Those in Amazonia and eastern and southeastern Brazil make "a rapid, alternating series of clear whistles". The song of S. g. aequatorialis is described as "a fast, rolling, semimusical trill, 'tr-r-r-r-r-r-r-r-r-r-r-r-r-r-eu' " and that of S. g. amazonus as a "series...of successively higher-pitched and gradually louder notes, 'pu-pu-pew-pew-peh-peh-peé-peh' ". In northeastern Brazil the song is "a high, fast, slightly rising 'weeweewee---' " and in southeastern Brazil a "very high, loud, descending 'weet weet weet --' ".

== Status ==
The IUCN follows HBW taxonomy and so has separately evaluated the "eastern" and "western" olivaceous woodcreepers. Both are assessed as being of Least Concern. Both have very large ranges; the population size of neither is known and both are believed to be declining. No immediate threats to either have been identified. Some authors have concluded that the olivaceous woodcreeper is moderately to highly sensitive to forest fragmentation but others have found population increases following fragmentation.
