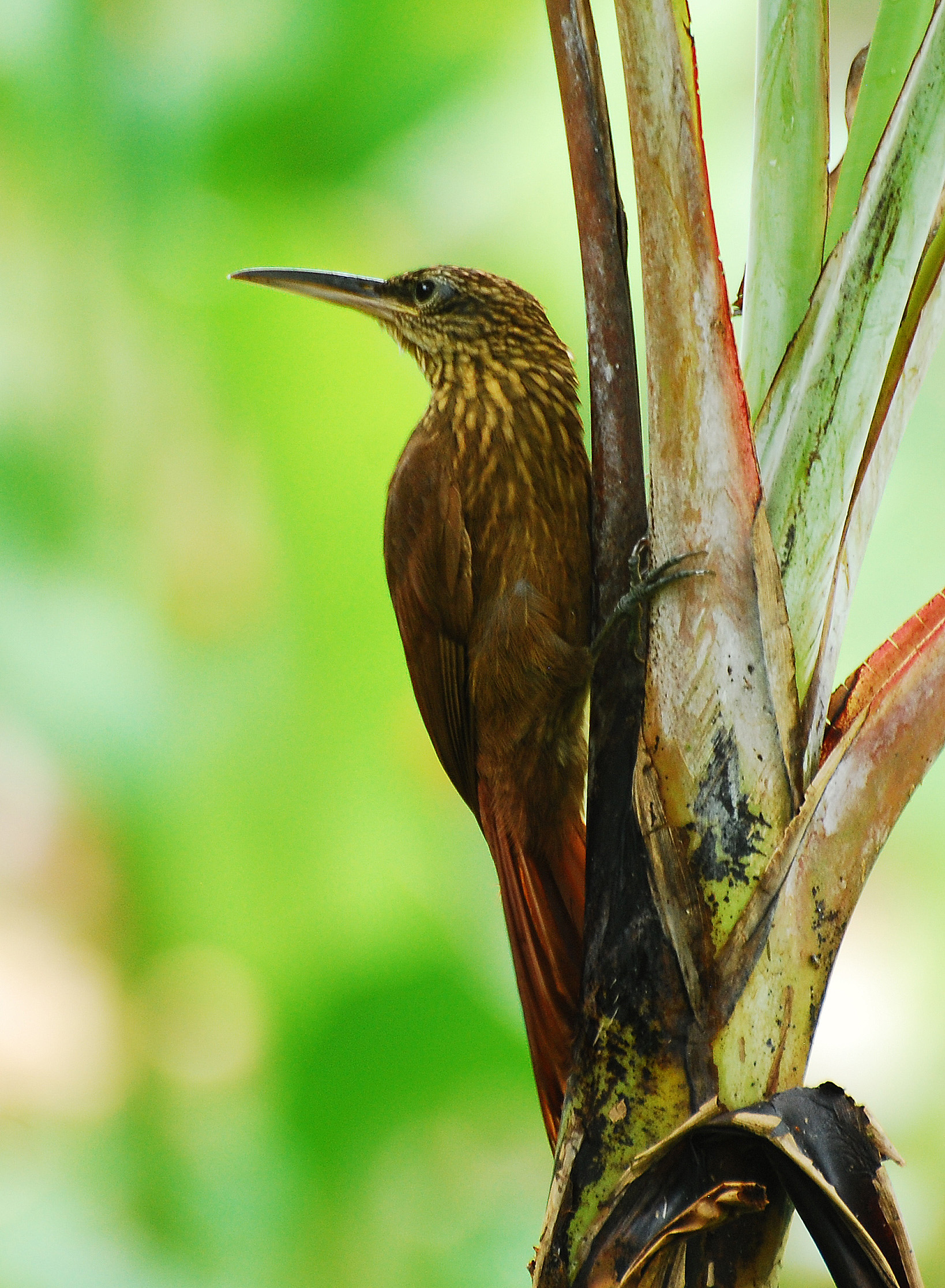
- Cocoa woodcreeper

Scientific classification
- Kingdom: Animalia
- Phylum: Chordata
- Class: Aves
- Order: Passeriformes
- Family: Furnariidae
- Subfamily: Dendrocolaptinae

Genera
- 16, see article text

= Woodcreeper =

Woodcreepers

Subfamily of birds

The woodcreepers (Dendrocolaptinae) comprise a subfamily of suboscine passerine birds endemic to the Neotropics. They have traditionally been considered a distinct family Dendrocolaptidae, but most authorities now place them as a subfamily of the ovenbirds (Furnariidae). They superficially resemble the Old World treecreepers, but they are only distantly related and the similarities are due to convergent evolution. The subfamily contains 60 species in 16 genera.

Woodcreepers range from 14 to 35 cm in length. Generally brownish birds, the true woodcreepers maintain an upright vertical posture, supported by their specialized stiff tails.

They feed mainly on insects taken from tree trunks. Some woodcreepers often form part of the core group at the centre of flocks attending army ant swarms. Woodcreepers are arboreal cavity-nesting birds; two or three white eggs are laid and incubated for about 15 to 21 days.

These birds can be difficult to identify in that they tend to have similar brown upperparts, and the more distinctive underparts are hard to see on a bird pressed against a trunk in deep forest shade. The bill shape, extend/shape of spots/streaks, and call are useful aids to determining species.

== Description ==
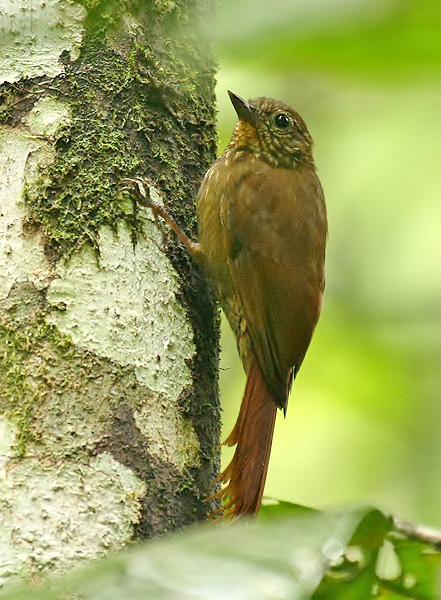
The wedge-billed woodcreeper is the smallest species in the subfamily (the xenops are smaller, but their exact taxonomic position has not been resolved).

The woodcreepers are generally fairly uniform in appearance. They range in size from the wedge-billed woodcreeper (13 cm (5.1 in)) to the strong-billed woodcreeper (35 cm (14 in)). Males tend to be slightly larger than females on average, but considerable overlap in size occurs in most species. Pronounced sexual dimorphism in size and plumage is rare. Bill size and shape accounts for much of the variation between the species. Bills can be straight or highly decurved, and can account for as much as a quarter of the length of the bird (as happens in the long-billed woodcreeper). The plumage is usually subdued and often brown, or sometimes rufous or other dark colours. Many species have patterns such as checking, spotting, or barring on their plumage. The feathers of the tail are rigid and are used for supporting the body when climbing tree trunks; the tail can support most of the body weight and birds that lose their tail find climbing difficult. Woodcreepers climb by flexing their legs and hopping up the trunk. The feet of the woodcreepers are also modified for climbing. The front toes are strongly clawed and toe IV is as long as toe III to increase the ability of the bird to grasp around branches. The legs are short but strong. Woodcreepers are also characterized by a belly feather growth pattern not found in any other birds.

== Habitat and distribution ==
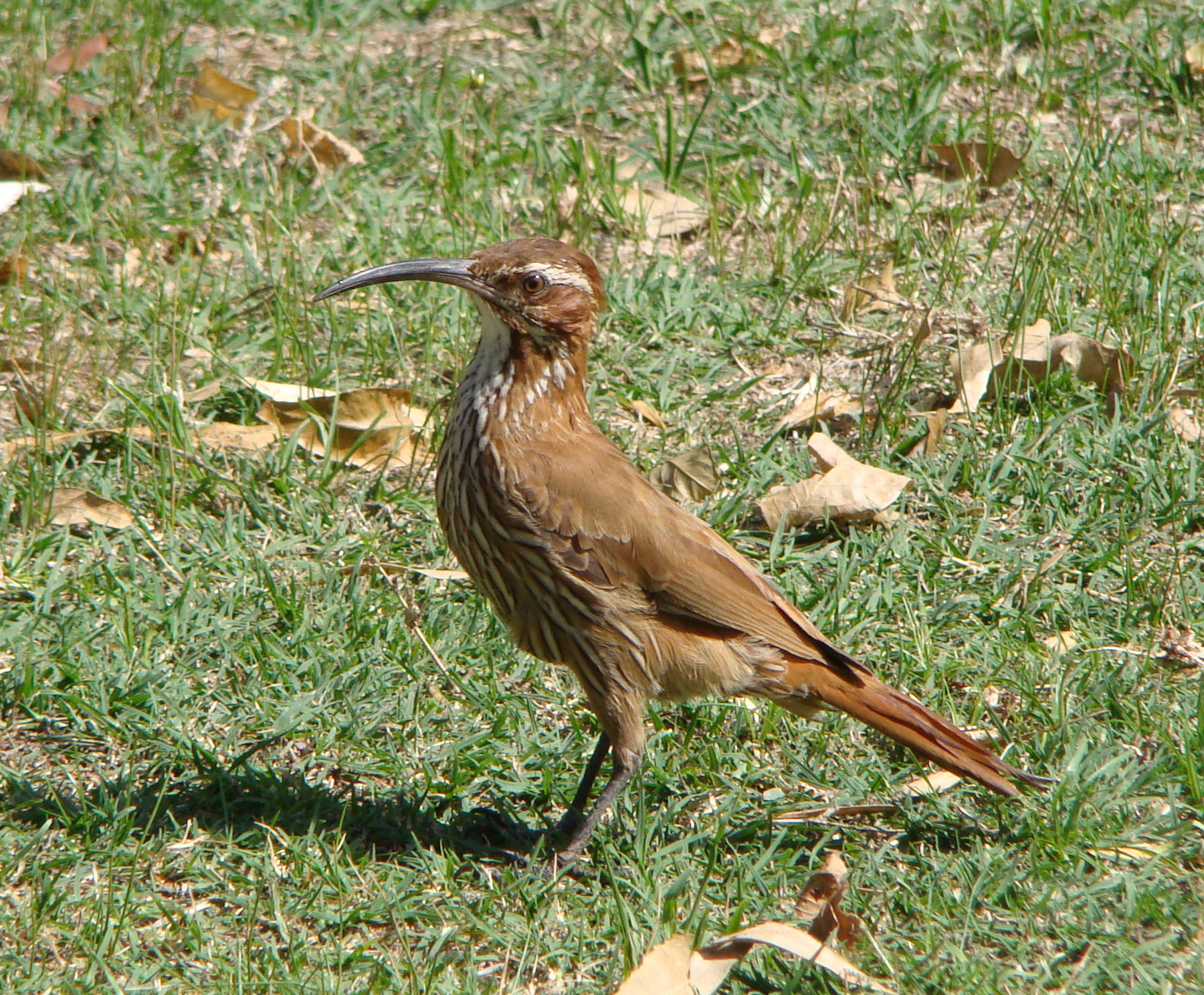
The scimitar-billed woodcreeper is unusual for the subfamily in living in open woodlands, and in being predominately a ground forager.

The woodcreepers are generally forest birds of Central and South America. Most species occur in rainforests, with the centre of diversity of the subfamily being the Amazon Basin. As many as 19 species of woodcreeper may co-occur in some areas of the Amazon, although in other rainforests, such as those in Costa Rica, the numbers are much lower. Other habitats used by the woodcreepers include pine-oak woodland, montane cloud forest, and pine forests. A few species, like the scimitar-billed woodcreeper, inhabit savannah or other partly open environments. Woodcreepers are absent from the temperate forests of southern South America.

== Behaviour ==
=== Diet and feeding ===
The woodcreepers are insectivores that are mostly arboreal in nature. Insects form the majority of the diet, with some spiders, centipedes, millipedes and even lizards being taken as well. A few specimens collected by scientists had fruit or seeds in their stomachs, but plant material is not thought to be regularly taken by any species. A few species forage on the ground, but most forage on the trunks of trees, on and on the underside of branches. They are generally solitary or occur in pairs, but frequently join mixed-species feeding flocks. The flocks they join are usually the lower level ones rather than canopy flocks, and are usually those insectivorous ones rather than frugivorous ones. Prey is almost always obtained by moving up the trunk or branch, and there are two main foraging techniques, probing and sallying. Probers investigate rough bark, mosses, masses of trapped dead leaves, bromeliads, and other areas where prey may be hiding, whereas those that sally launch into the air briefly to snatch prey that has been flushed by their movement. Several species regularly attend swarms of army ants to catch prey flushed by the ants.

== Systematics ==
The former family has been merged into the ovenbird family, Furnariidae, by most authorities because analyses of mitochondrial and nuclear sequence data showed that the clade formed by Sclerurus leaftossers and Geositta miners is basal to the Furnariidae and the woodcreepers. An alternative option was recommended by Moyle et al. (2009), in which the woodcreepers maintain their status as a family, while the ovenbirds (as traditionally defined) are split into two families: Scleruridae and Furnariidae.

The genus Xenops, which have usually been considered ovenbirds, represent an early divergence. Although some analyses suggested that they are more closely related to the woodcreepers than to true furnariids, other studies have not found the same results. Others suggested placing Xenops in its own family Xenopidae.

Evolutionary relationships among woodcreeper species are now fairly well known thanks to the use of DNA sequence data. Some previous results based on morphology were not supported by molecular data, mostly due to instances of convergent evolution in beak morphology. Plumage patterns, on the other hand, are more in agreement with the molecular data.

DNA studies revealed that Deconychura species belong into separate genera and that the Greater scythebill is not closely related to other scythebills in the genus Campylorhamphus but to Drymornis. Moving Lepidocolaptes fuscus to Xiphorhynchus restores monophyly of Lepidocolaptes.

Additionally, the species-level taxonomy of several groups requires further study. Examples of "species" where vocal and morphological variations suggests that more than one species-level taxon could be involved are the curve-billed scythebill and the white-chinned, olivaceous, strong-billed and straight-billed woodcreepers. The genus Xiphorhynchus also requires much more research in this regard. Hylexetastes may contain anything from one to four species.

A cladogram of the 16 woodcreeper genera based on the results of a 2020 molecular phylogenetic study of the suboscines by Michael Harvey and collaborators is shown below.

- Dendrocolaptinae
  - Glyphorynchus – wedge-billed woodcreeper
  - - - Certhiasomus – spot-throated woodcreeper
      - - Dendrocincla – 6 species
        - - Deconychura – 3 species (long-tailed woodcreepers)
          - Sittasomus – olivaceous woodcreeper
    - - - - Xiphocolaptes – 4 species
          - Hylexetastes – 3 species
        - - Dendrocolaptes – 5 species
          - - Dendrexetastes – cinnamon-throated woodcreeper
            - Nasica – long-billed woodcreeper
      - - Xiphorhynchus – 13 species
        - - Dendroplex – 2 species
          - - Campylorhamphus – 6 species (scythebills)
            - - Lepidocolaptes – 11 species
              - - Drymotoxeres – greater scythebill
                - Drymornis – scimitar-billed woodcreeper

Tribe	Image	Genus	Species
Sittasomini – "intermediate" woodcreepers		Certhiasomus Derryberry et al., 2010	Spot-throated woodcreeper, Certhiasomus stictolaemus
Sittasomini – "intermediate" woodcreepers		Deconychura Cherrie, 1891	Little long-tailed woodcreeper, Deconychura typica; Northern long-tailed woodcreeper, Deconychura longicauda; Southern long-tailed woodcreeper, Deconychura pallida
Sittasomini – "intermediate" woodcreepers		Sittasomus Swainson, 1827	Olivaceous woodcreeper, Sittasomus griseicapillus
Sittasomini – "intermediate" woodcreepers		Dendrocincla G.R. Gray, 1840	Tyrannine woodcreeper, Dendrocincla tyrannina; Plain-winged woodcreeper, Dendrocincla turdina; Tawny-winged woodcreeper, Dendrocincla anabatina; Plain-brown woodcreeper, Dendrocincla fuliginosa; White-chinned woodcreeper, Dendrocincla merula; Ruddy woodcreeper, Dendrocincla homochroa
Dendrocolaptini – "strong-billed" woodcreepers
Dendrocolaptini – "strong-billed" woodcreepers		Glyphorynchus Wied-Neuwied, 1831	Wedge-billed woodcreeper, Glyphorynchus spirurus
Dendrocolaptini – "strong-billed" woodcreepers		Nasica Lesson, 1830	Long-billed woodcreeper, Nasica longirostris
Dendrocolaptini – "strong-billed" woodcreepers		Dendrexetastes Eyton, 1851	Cinnamon-throated woodcreeper, Dendrexetastes rufigula
Dendrocolaptini – "strong-billed" woodcreepers		Dendrocolaptes Hermann, 1804	Northern barred woodcreeper, Dendrocolaptes sanctithomae; Amazonian barred woodcreeper, Dendrocolaptes certhia; Concolor woodcreeper, Dendrocolaptes (certhia) concolor; Hoffmanns's woodcreeper, Dendrocolaptes hoffmannsi; Black-banded woodcreeper, Dendrocolaptes picumnus; Planalto woodcreeper, Dendrocolaptes platyrostris
Dendrocolaptini – "strong-billed" woodcreepers		Hylexetastes P.L. Sclater, 1889	Bar-bellied woodcreeper, Hylexetastes stresemanni; Red-billed woodcreeper, Hylexetastes perrotii; Uniform woodcreeper, Hylexetastes (perrotii) uniformis; Brigida's woodcreeper, Hylexetastes (perrotii) brigidai
Dendrocolaptini – "strong-billed" woodcreepers		Xiphocolaptes Lesson, 1840	White-throated woodcreeper, Xiphocolaptes albicollis; Moustached woodcreeper, Xiphocolaptes falcirostris; Great rufous woodcreeper, Xiphocolaptes major; Strong-billed woodcreeper, Xiphocolaptes promeropirhynchus
Dendrocolaptini – "strong-billed" woodcreepers		Dendroplex Swainson, 1827	Straight-billed woodcreeper, Dendroplex picus; Zimmer's woodcreeper, Dendroplex kienerii (formerly Xiphorhynchus necopinus)
Dendrocolaptini – "strong-billed" woodcreepers		Xiphorhynchus Swainson, 1827 (possibly polyphyletic)	Lesser woodcreeper, Xiphorhynchus fuscus (formerly in Lepidocolaptes); Spix's woodcreeper, Xiphorhynchus spixii; Elegant woodcreeper, Xiphorhynchus elegans; Juruá woodcreeper or Ihering's woodcreeper, Xiphorhynchus (elegans) juruanus; Ocellated woodcreeper, Xiphorhynchus ocellatus; Tschudi's woodcreeper, Xiphorhynchus (ocellatus) chunchotambo; Chestnut-rumped woodcreeper, Xiphorhynchus pardalotus; Striped woodcreeper, Xiphorhynchus obsoletus; Spotted woodcreeper, Xiphorhynchus erythropygius; Olive-backed woodcreeper, Xiphorhynchus triangularis; Ivory-billed woodcreeper, Xiphorhynchus flavigaster; Black-striped woodcreeper, Xiphorhynchus lachrymosus; Buff-throated woodcreeper, Xiphorhynchus guttatus; Lafresnaye's woodcreeper, Xiphorhynchus (guttatus) guttatoides; Dusky-billed woodcreeper, Xiphorhynchus (guttatus/guttatoides) eytoni; Cocoa woodcreeper, Xiphorhynchus susurrans; Lawrence's woodcreeper, Xiphorhynchus (susurrans) nanus
Dendrocolaptini – "strong-billed" woodcreepers		Campylorhamphus W. Bertoni, 1901	Red-billed scythebill, Campylorhamphus trochilirostris; Brown-billed scythebill, Campylorhamphus pusillus; Black-billed scythebill, Campylorhamphus falcularius; Curve-billed scythebill, Campylorhamphus procurvoides
Dendrocolaptini – "strong-billed" woodcreepers		Drymotoxeres Claramunt, Derryberry, Chesser, RT, Aleixo & Brumfield, 2010	Greater scythebill, Drymotoxeres pucheranii
Dendrocolaptini – "strong-billed" woodcreepers		Drymornis Eyton, 1852	Scimitar-billed woodcreeper, Drymornis bridgesii
Dendrocolaptini – "strong-billed" woodcreepers		Lepidocolaptes Reichenbach, 1853	Narrow-billed woodcreeper Lepidocolaptes angustirostris; White-striped woodcreeper Lepidocolaptes leucogaster; Guianan woodcreeper Lepidocolaptes albolineatus; Duida woodcreeper Lepidocolaptes duidae; Inambari woodcreeper Lepidocolaptes fatimalimae; Dusky-capped woodcreeper Lepidocolaptes fuscicapillus; Spot-crowned woodcreeper Lepidocolaptes affinis; Montane woodcreeper Lepidocolaptes lacrymiger; Streak-headed woodcreeper Lepidocolaptes souleyetii; Scaled woodcreeper Lepidocolaptes squamatus; Wagler's woodcreeper Lepidocolaptes (squamatus) wagleri; Scalloped woodcreeper Lepidocolaptes falcinellus
