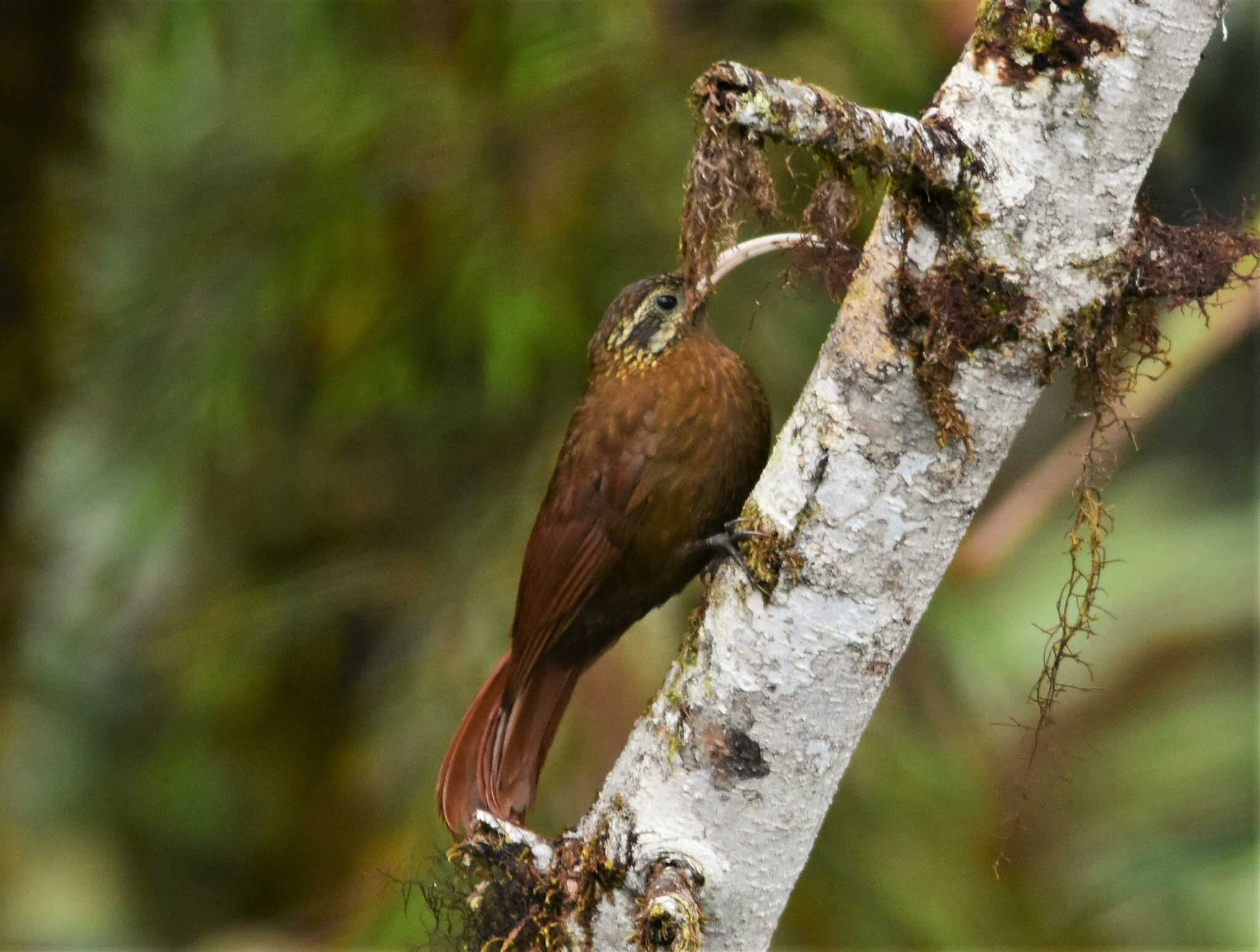

Conservation status
- Least Concern (IUCN 3.1)

Scientific classification
- Kingdom: Animalia
- Phylum: Chordata
- Class: Aves
- Order: Passeriformes
- Family: Furnariidae
- Subfamily: Dendrocolaptinae
- Genus: Drymotoxeres; Claramunt, Derryberry, Chesser, RT, Aleixo & Brumfield, 2010
- Species: D. pucheranii

Binomial name
- Drymotoxeres pucheranii (Lafresnaye, 1849)

Synonyms
- Campylorhamphus pucherani

= Greater scythebill =

Species of bird

The greater scythebill (Drymotoxeres pucheranii) is a species of suboscine passerine bird in the subfamily Dendrocolaptinae of the ovenbird family Furnariidae. It is found in Colombia, Ecuador, and Peru.

== Taxonomy and systematics ==
The greater scythebill was long included in genus Campylorhamphus with most other scythebills, but the discovery of its closer affinities with the scimitar-billed woodcreeper (Drymornis bridgesii) resulted in the creation of the new genus Drymotoxeres for the greater scythebill. The two are genetically more closely related to each other than to the other scythebills and woodcreepers.

The greater scythebill is the only member of its genus and is monotypic: no subspecies are recognized.

== Description ==
The greater scythebill is 24 to 30 cm (9.4 to 12 in) long and weighs 63 to 78 g (2.2 to 2.8 oz). It is the largest and heaviest scythebill with a shorter, stouter, and less curved bill than the others. The sexes have the same plumage. Adults have blackish brown ear coverts, a distinct whitish supercilium, and an even bolder whitish moustachial stripe. Their upperparts are dull rufous brown to chestnut with a darker crown. Their crown and nape have thin buff streaks that sometimes continue onto the upper back. Their rump, wings, and tail are dark rufous-chestnut. Their underparts are rufous-brown to chestnut with grayish streaks on the throat, breast, and sometimes the upper belly. Their iris is dark brown, their bill dull pinkish horn to creamy gray with a blackish base to the culmen, and their legs and feet brownish gray to dark brown. Juveniles are more rufescent than adults with coarser but less well defined streaking above and below.

== Distribution and habitat ==
The greater scythebill is found only locally, in the Andes of central and southwestern Colombia, on the western slope of the Ecuadoran Andes south to Pichincha Province, and all along the eastern slope of the Ecuadoran Andes into Peru as far as the Department of Cuzco. It inhabits humid montane forest in the subtropical to temperate zones. It favors the interior of evergreen forest, cloudforest, and elfin forest; it does occur at the forest edges and occasionally in banana plantations. In elevation it ranges between 900 and 3,250 m (3,000 and 10,700 ft) but most often between 1,000 and 3,000 m (3,300 and 9,800 ft) in Colombia and 2,000 and 2,800 m (6,600 and 9,200 ft) in Ecuador and Peru.

== Behavior ==
=== Movement ===
The greater scythebill is believed to be a year-round resident throughout its range.

=== Feeding ===
The greater scythebill's diet is not known in detail but is believed to be mostly arthropods. It is almost always seen singly and readily joins mixed-species feeding flocks. It typically forages in the forest's lower and middle levels. It hitches up trunks and branches, gleaning prey from the surface and probing into crevices and moss.

=== Breeding ===
The greater scythebill's breeding biology is almost unknown. Its breeding season includes October. The one known nest was in a vertical cavity in a living tree and contained two eggs.

=== Vocalization ===
The greater scythebill's song is described as an "alternating series of twitters and nasal 'ik' notes" and by another author as "a rather weak and nasal, ascending 'ee-ee-ee-ee-ee-énh' ". It is very different from those of all other scythebills.

== Status ==
The IUCN has assessed the greater scythebill as Least Concern. It has a very large range, though its population size is not known and is believed to be decreasing. It is primarily threatened by habitat loss from deforestation, and may be particularly sensitive to habitat disturbance.
