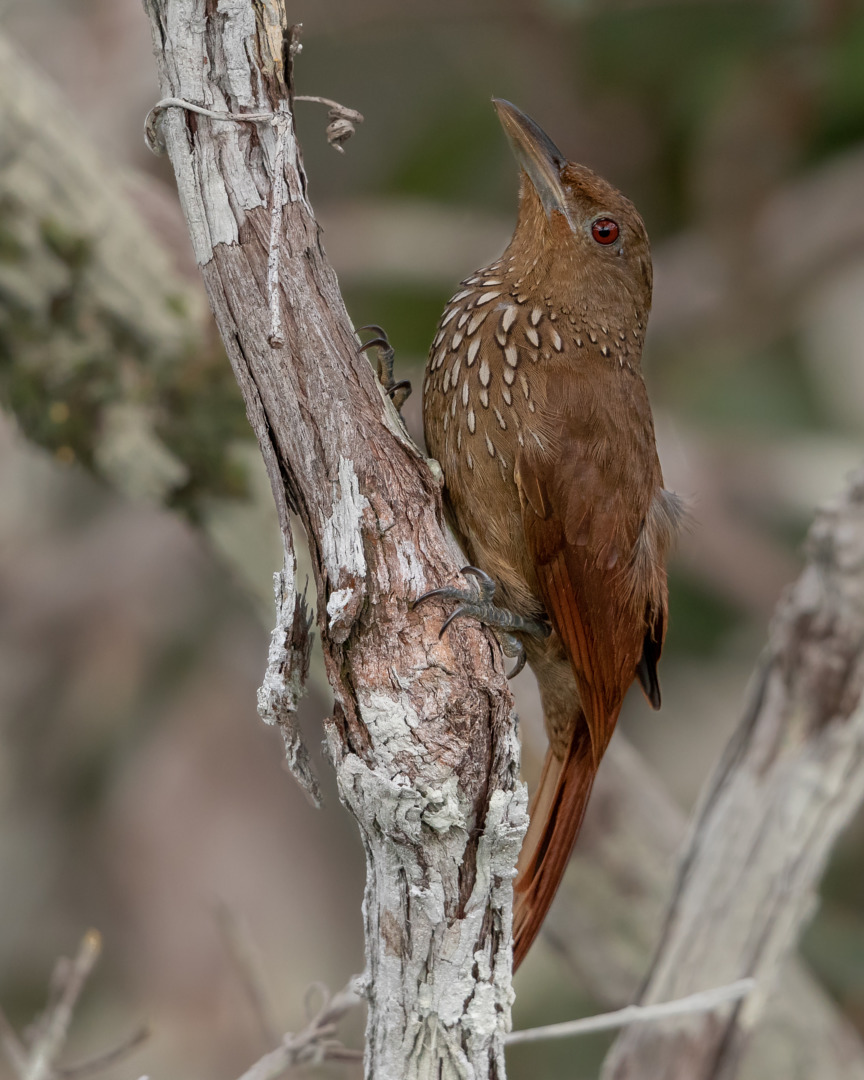

Conservation status
- Least Concern (IUCN 3.1)

Scientific classification
- Kingdom: Animalia
- Phylum: Chordata
- Class: Aves
- Order: Passeriformes
- Family: Furnariidae
- Subfamily: Dendrocolaptinae
- Genus: Dendrexetastes; Eyton, 1851
- Species: D. rufigula

Binomial name
- Dendrexetastes rufigula (Lesson, 1844)

= Cinnamon-throated woodcreeper =

Species of bird

The cinnamon-throated woodcreeper (Dendrexetastes rufigula) is a sub-oscine passerine bird in subfamily Dendrocolaptinae of the ovenbird family Furnariidae. It is found in Bolivia, Brazil, Colombia, Ecuador, French Guiana, Guyana, Peru, Suriname, and Venezuela.

== Taxonomy and systematics ==
The cinnamon-throated woodcreeper is the only member of genus Dendrexetastes. Four subspecies are recognized:

- D. r. devillei (Lafresnaye, 1850)
- D. r. rufigula (Lesson, RP, 1844)
- D. r. moniliger Zimmer, JT, 1934
- D. r. paraensis Lorenz von Liburnau, L, 1895

Subspecies D. r. devillei has been proposed as a separate species but differs little from the others in voice.

The cinnamon-throated woodcreeper is genetically most closely related to the long-billed woodcreeper (Nasica longirostris).

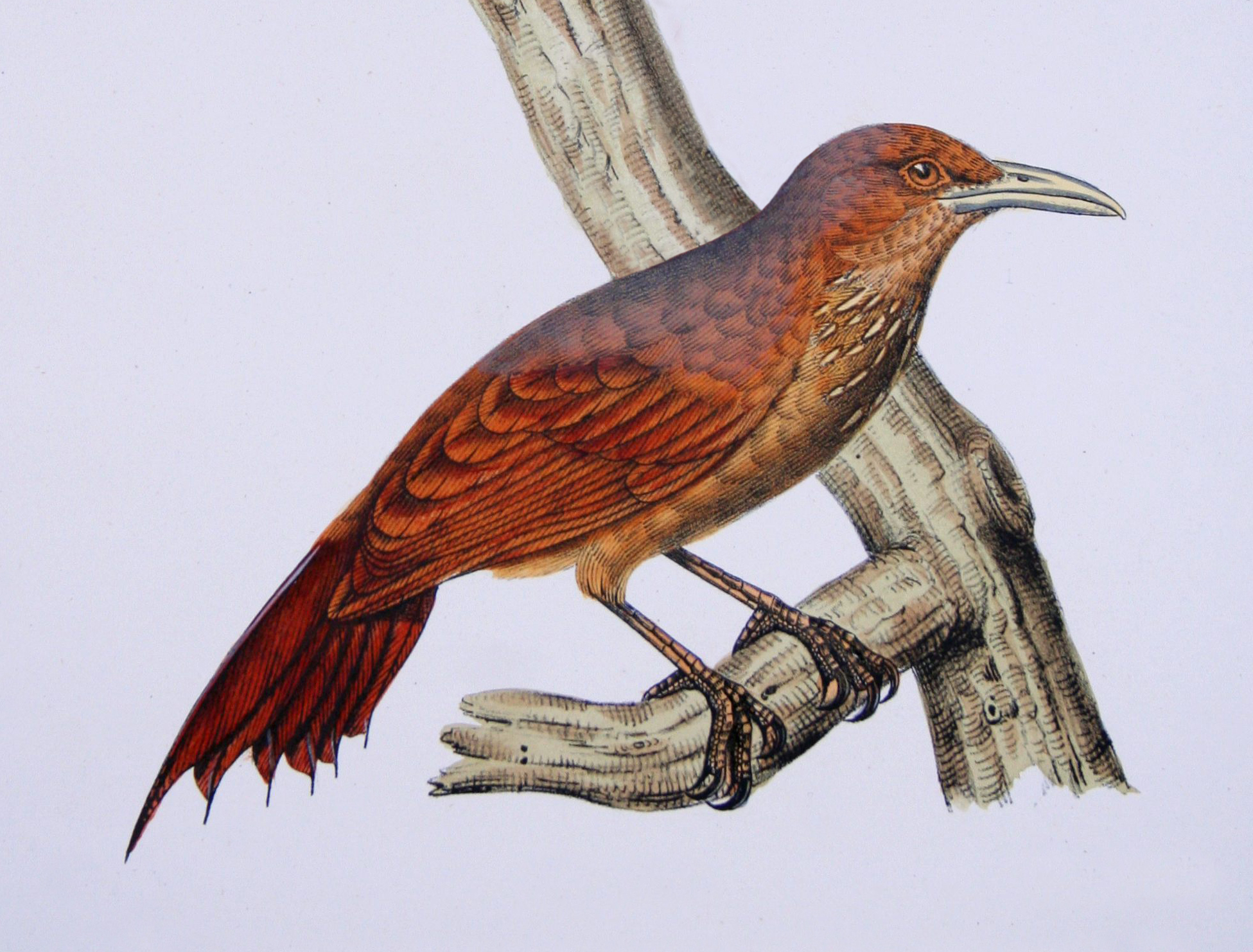
D. r. devillei

== Description ==
The cinnamon-throated woodcreeper is one of the larger woodcreepers, with a heavy body, short wings, and a short, stout, bill with a slightly hooked tip. It is 22.5 to 27 cm (8.9 to 11 in) long. Males weigh 64 to 74 g (2.3 to 2.6 oz) and females 66 to 77 g (2.3 to 2.7 oz). The sexes are alike. The nominate subspecies D. r. rufigula has mostly medium brown upperparts with a paler crown and rufous-chestnut wings, rump, and tail. A few whitish streaks span the nape and upper back. It is generally paler and more cinnamon-brown below. Its throat is a brightish rusty buff, its breast has wide black-edged whitish streaks that extend to the sides of the neck, and sometimes weak darker bars on the lower belly and undertail coverts. Its iris is red to light brown, its bill horn-gray, bluish horn, or brownish to dull greenish yellow, and its legs and feet slate gray, greenish gray, bluish black, or brown.

Subspecies D. r. devillei has a weaker pattern than the nominate, with much fainter streaks on the breast, none on the neck, and no bars on the belly. D. r. paraensis is very like the nominate, but with a bold white supercilium and rounder streaks on the breast and neck. D. r. moniliger is duller and less rufescent than the other subspecies, but has bolder streaking on the breast and neck.

== Distribution and habitat ==
The subspecies of the cinnamon-throated woodcreeper are found thus:

- D. r. devillei, western Amazonia from central Colombia, eastern Ecuador, and eastern Peru east into Brazil as far as the Rio Madeira (and probably to the Rio Negro) and south into northern Bolivia
- D. r. rufigula, northeastern Amazonia from eastern Venezuela through the Guianas, and northern Brazil from the Rio Negro to the Atlantic Ocean
- D. r. moniliger, Amazonian Brazil south of the Amazon River between the Rio Madeira and the Rio Tocantins and south to Mato Grosso
- D. r. paraensis, Amazonian Brazil south of the Amazon and east of the Rio Tocantins

The cinnamon-throated woodcreeper mostly inhabits humid forest, both terra firme and várzea. In the Guianas it typically occurs in forest on sand ridges and savanna. It favors palm forest, the edges of evergreen forest, and mid- to late-age secondary forest rather than the interior of primary forest; it also frequently occurs on river islands. In elevation it mostly occurs below 500 m (1,600 ft) but is occasionally found as high as 950 m (3,100 ft) in the Andean foothills at the western edge of its range.

== Behavior ==
=== Movement ===
The cinnamon-throated woodcreeper is a year-round resident throughout its range.

=== Feeding ===
The cinnamon-throated woodcreeper forages alone or in mixed-species feeding flocks about equally, but less frequently in pairs. It hitches along trunks and branches from the forest's mid-level to the canopy and also creeps and probes among living and dead leaf clusters and epiphytes. Its diet is not known in detail but appears to be mainly arthropods with some fruit.

=== Breeding ===
The cinnamon-throated woodcreeper's breeding season is not well known; in the Guianas it breeds in the dry season. It nests in a tree cavity, either natural or excavated by a woodpecker, and also sometimes in thatched roofs. The clutch is two or three eggs. The incubation period, time to fledging, and details of parental care are not known.

=== Vocalization ===
The cinnamon-throated woodcreeper sings mostly at dawn and dusk. One author describes the song as "a fast series of loud rattled notes, ascending at first and descending and trailing off at the end". It "always ends with a distinctive lower-pitched 'tchew' or 'trreew' note". Another describes it as a "very high loud series of ringing notes, sounding almost like a trill."

== Status ==
The IUCN has assessed the cinnamon-throated woodcreeper as being of Least Concern. It has a very large range, and though its population size is not known it is believed to be stable. No immediate threats have been identified. It is considered to be "uncommon to common, but often local, throughout its range." It is more often heard than seen, which makes accurate counts difficult. It is thought to be "highly sensitive to habitat modification, even disappearing from selectively logged forest at one site."
