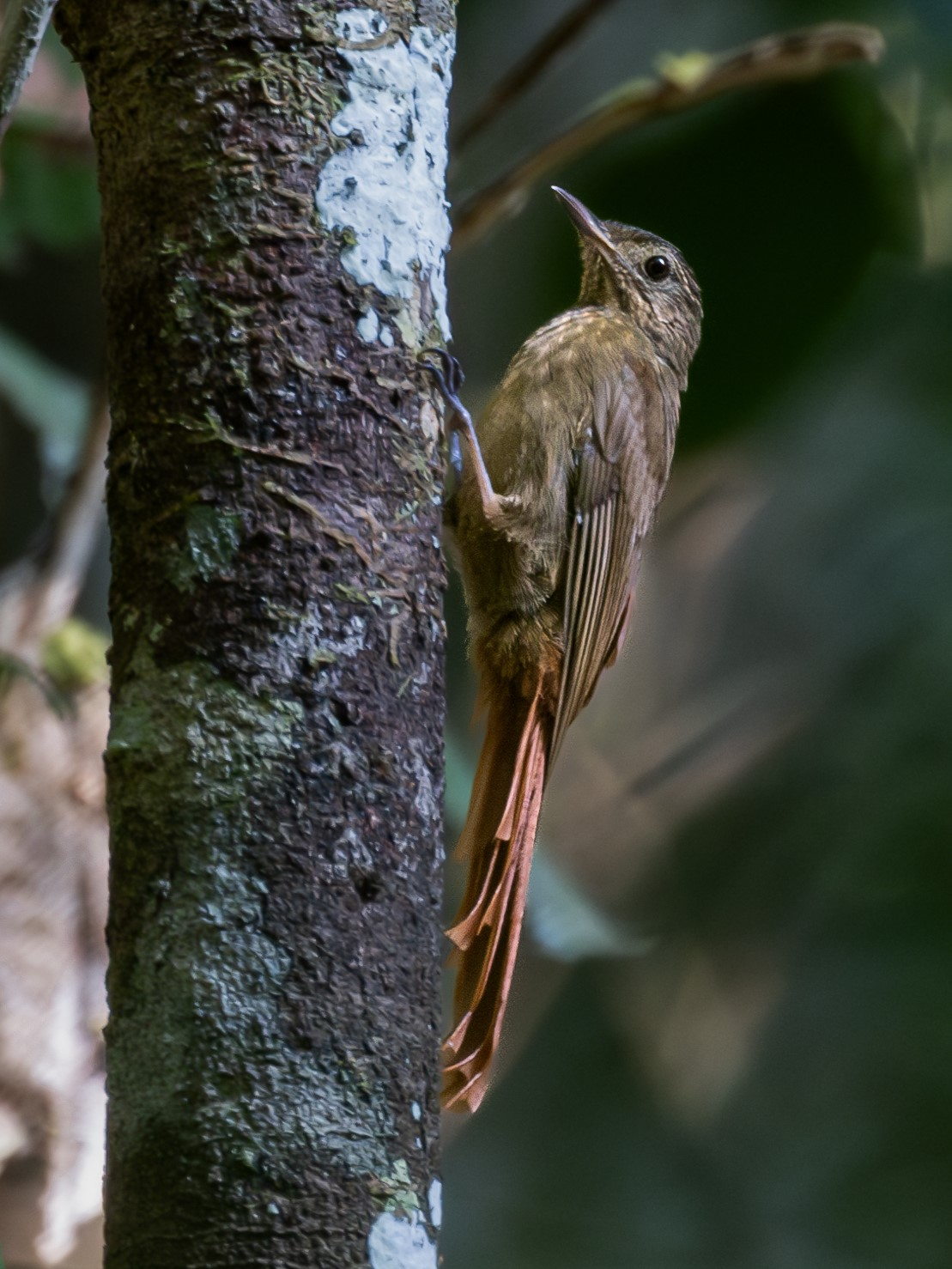

Conservation status
- Least Concern (IUCN 3.1)

Scientific classification
- Kingdom: Animalia
- Phylum: Chordata
- Class: Aves
- Order: Passeriformes
- Family: Furnariidae
- Subfamily: Dendrocolaptinae
- Genus: Certhiasomus; Derryberry et al., 2010
- Species: C. stictolaemus

Binomial name
- Certhiasomus stictolaemus (Pelzeln, 1868)

Synonyms
- Deconychura stictolaema

= Spot-throated woodcreeper =

Species of bird

The spot-throated woodcreeper (Certhiasomus stictolaemus) is a species of bird in subfamily Dendrocolaptinae of the ovenbird family Furnariidae. It is found in Brazil, Colombia, Ecuador, French Guiana, Guyana, Peru, Venezuela, and possibly Suriname.

== Taxonomy and systematics ==
The spot-throated woodcreeper was formerly included in genus Deconychura together with the long-tailed woodcreeper (D. longicauda), but the two are not closely related.

It is the only member of genus Certhiasomus and has these three subspecies:

- C. s. secundus (Zimmer, J.T., 1929)
- C. s. clarior (Hellmayr, 1904)
- C. s. stictolaemus (Pelzeln, 1868)

Subspecies C. s. secundus has sometimes been treated as a separate species.

== Description ==
The spot-throated woodcreeper is 16.5 to 19 cm (6.5 to 7.5 in) long. Males weigh 14 to 22 g (0.49 to 0.78 oz) and females 13 to 17 g (0.46 to 0.60 oz). The species is slim, with a long tail and a short slim bill. The sexes are alike in plumage. The nominate subspecies C. s. stictolaemus is mostly olive-brown above, with buffy streaks on the crown and nape and a more rufous chestnut rump and uppertail coverts. Its flight feathers are mostly dusky brown with some rufous on the tips and often a bright cinnamon shoulder. Its tail is russet to deep chestnut. It has pale lores and a buffy supercilium, both of which are rather inconspicuous. Its throat is dull buff to olive-buff with darker speckles that becomes olive-brown on the breast; its breast has buff wedge-shaped spots. Its iris is dark brown, it bill dark brown with a silvery mandible, and its legs and feet grayish blue to brownish gray.

Subspecies C. s. secundus is slightly larger than the nominate. Its upperparts are more rufescent and its underparts more olive with more obvious spotting. C. s. clarior is overall paler than the nominate, but more rufescent and has a blacker crown.

== Distribution and habitat ==
The spot-throated woodcreeper is a bird of the Amazon Basin. Its subspecies are distributed thus:

- C. s. secundus, western Amazonia from southern Colombia and southern Venezuela south to eastern Ecuador, northeastern Peru, and northwestern Brazil as far east as the Rio Negro and Rio Madeira
- C. s. clarior, northeastern Amazonia north of the Amazon River and east of the Rio Negro in Brazil, French Guiana, and Guyana. (Unconfirmed sight records in Suriname lead the South American Classification Committee of the American Ornithological Society to classify it as hypothetical in that country.)
- C. s. stictolaemus, southern Amazonia in Brazil south of the Amazon between the Rio Madeira and Rios Tocantins and Maranhão, and south to northern Mato Grosso state

The spot-throated woodcreeper is a bird of humid forest, where it favors the interior of undisturbed forest but also occasionally occurs at its edges and in mature secondary forest. Both floodplain and terra firme forests host it though it also occurs in igapó (blackwater) forests and those on sandy soil. In elevation it ranges from near sea level to 500 m (1,600 ft).

== Behavior ==
=== Movement ===
The spot-throated woodcreeper is a year-round resident throughout its range.

=== Feeding ===
The spot-throated woodcreeper almost always forages as part of a mixed-species feeding flock, and is usually there singly. It feeds by hitching itself up tree trunks, often low to the ground but as high as 10 m (33 ft). It feeds on tiny to small arthropods by picking them from the substrate or in brief sallies from the tree.

=== Breeding ===
Almost nothing is known about the spot-throated woodcreeper's breeding biology. Its breeding season appears to vary somewhat geographically but includes at least December to April.

=== Vocalization ===
The spot-throated woodcreeper's song is a "high, short, staccato rattle, slightly rising and trailing off." It gives " a stuttered 'sip! sip-ip-ip' " alarm call.

== Status ==
The IUCN has assessed the spot-throated woodcreeper as being of Least Concern. It has a very large range but its population size is not known and is believed to be decreasing. No immediate threats have been identified. It is thought to be fairly common to common but because it is inconspicuous may be undercounted. It appears to be very sensitive to forest disturbance.
