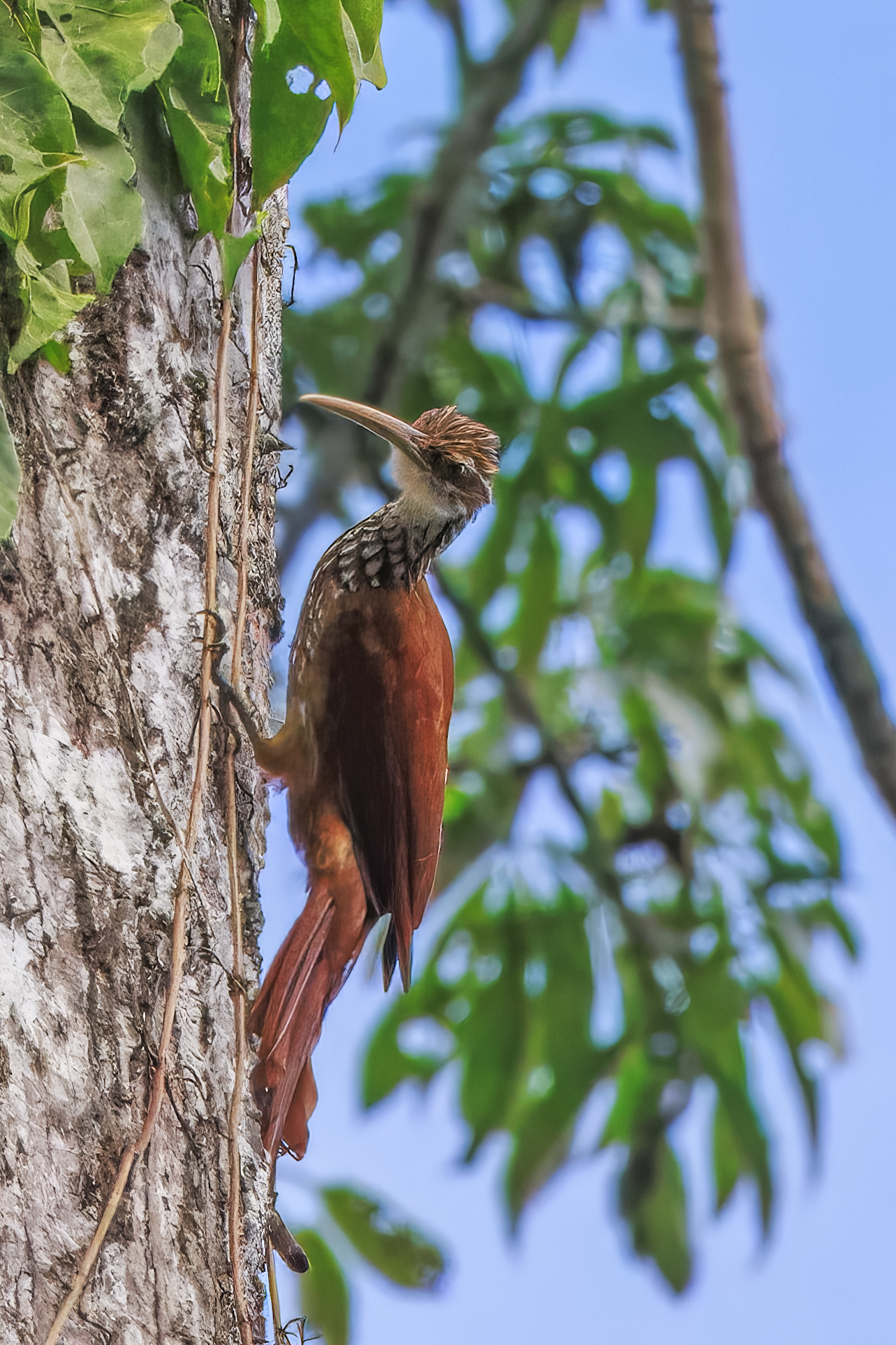
- in Ecuador

Conservation status
- Least Concern (IUCN 3.1)

Scientific classification
- Kingdom: Animalia
- Phylum: Chordata
- Class: Aves
- Order: Passeriformes
- Family: Furnariidae
- Subfamily: Dendrocolaptinae
- Genus: Nasica; Lesson, 1830
- Species: N. longirostris

Binomial name
- Nasica longirostris (Vieillot, 1818)

= Long-billed woodcreeper =

Species of bird

The long-billed woodcreeper (Nasica longirostris) is a sub-oscine passerine bird in subfamily Dendrocolaptinae of the ovenbird family Furnariidae. It is found in Bolivia, Brazil, Colombia, Ecuador, French Guiana, Peru, and Venezuela.

== Taxonomy and systematics ==
The long-billed woodcreeper is the only member of genus Nasica. It is monotypic: No subspecies are recognized. Its closest relative is the cinnamon-throated woodcreeper (Dendrexetastes rufigula).

The population south of the Amazon River has significantly longer bills than those birds north of the river, and has been treated by some authors as subspecies N. l. australis.

== Description ==
The long-billed woodcreeper is one of the largest woodcreepers, with a slim body, small head, long neck, long tail, and an exceptionally long, slightly decurved, bill. It is 34 to 36 cm (13 to 14 in) long and weighs 78 to 92 g (2.8 to 3.2 oz). The sexes are alike. The adult's crown, nape, and auricular area are blackish brown with whitish buff streaks. It has a white supercilium, throat, and foreneck. Its back, rump, wings, and tail are bright cinnamon-rufous to rufous-chestnut. The tips of its outermost primaries are dark brown. Its breast and sides are streaked black and white; the rest of its underparts are olive-buff with spots and bars. Its iris is yellowish brown, reddish brown, or dark brown. Its bill is ivory to light gray or yellowish gray, often with a dusky base to the mandible. Its legs and feet are gray to brown. Juvenile birds have paler underparts than adults, sometimes with faint barring on the belly, and with paler and less distinct streaks on the breast.

== Distribution and habitat ==
The long-billed woodcreeper is found in the Orinoco River Basin of southern Venezuela and in the Amazon Basin from eastern Colombia, central Ecuador, north-central and eastern Peru, and northern Bolivia through Amazonian Brazil to the Atlantic Ocean in the states of Amapá, Pará, and Maranhão. Its range also extends north into central and eastern French Guiana. It is seldom far from water, and primarily inhabits the interior and edges of várzea, river-edge, and swamp forests and on well-forested river islands. It occurs somewhat less frequently in terra firme and cerrado gallery forests. In elevation it mostly occurs below 300 m (1,000 ft). In Colombia and Ecuador it reaches 400 m (1,300 ft), and is found up to 500 m (1,600 ft) in some other places.

== Behavior ==
=== Movement ===
The long-billed woodcreeper is a year-round resident throughout its range.

=== Feeding ===
The long-billed woodcreeper usually forages by itself, but also in pairs and sometimes in mixed-species feeding flocks. It hitches along trunks and large branches from the forest's mid-level to the canopy and also creeps and probes among living and dead leaf clusters, epiphytes, bark crevices, and palm fronds. It sometimes feeds on prey fleeing army ant swarms but does not habitually follow swarms. Its diet is not known in detail but appears to be mainly arthropods and also includes small reptiles and amphibians.

=== Breeding ===
The long-billed woodcreeper's breeding season is not well defined but appears to include at least January to May. A nest was discovered in a tree cavity 4 m (13 ft) above the ground. Both parents were feeding nestlings. The clutch size, incubation period, time to fledging, and other details of parental care are not known.

=== Vocalization ===
The long-billed woodcreeper sings during the day, but infrequently. Its song is a "[l]oud and far-carrying...series of 3-4 eerie and plaintive whistles, e.e. 't w o o o o o ó o o...t w o o o o o ó o o'." It is also described as "loud melancholy-sounding, drawn-out calls 'wuuuueet' " repeated three or four times. Its calls include "chat-ak", "chat-at-at", "chuckling notes", "weetut", and "weet-erweet".

== Status ==
The IUCN has assessed the long-billed woodcreeper as being of Least Concern. It has a very large range, but its population size is not known and is believed to be decreasing. No immediate threats have been identified. It is considered generally uncommon to fairly common though rare at the fringes of its range in Bolivia and French Guiana. It is thought to be "highly sensitive to habitat modification and disturbance."
