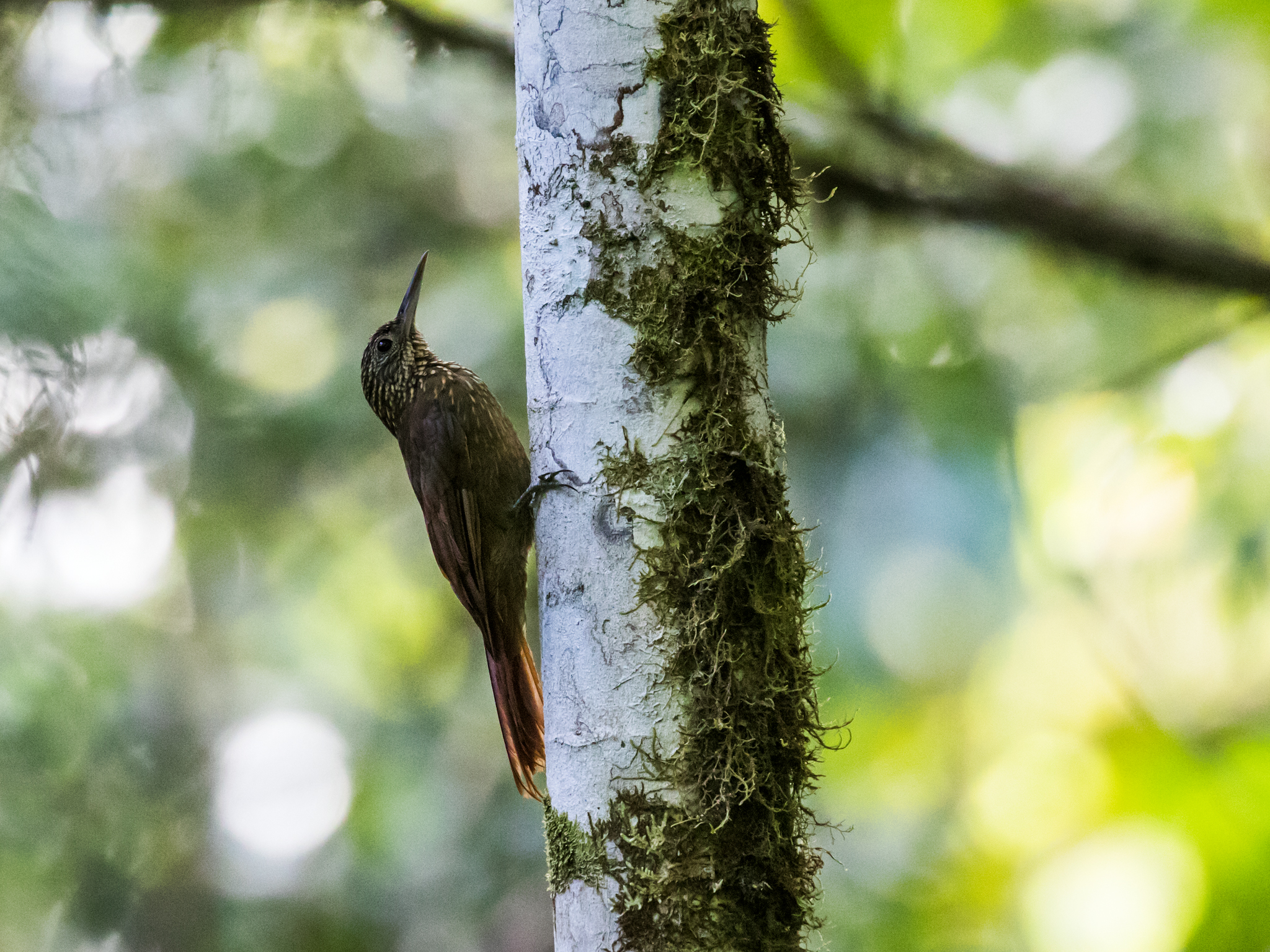

Scientific classification
- Kingdom: Animalia
- Phylum: Chordata
- Class: Aves
- Order: Passeriformes
- Family: Furnariidae
- Genus: Xiphorhynchus
- Species: X. ocellatus
- Subspecies: X. o. chunchotambo

Trinomial name
- Xiphorhynchus ocellatus chunchotambo (Tschudi, 1844)

Synonyms
- Xiphorhynchus chunchotambo

= Tschudi's woodcreeper =

Subspecies of bird

Tschudi's woodcreeper (Xiphorhynchus ocellatus chunchotambo) is a passerine bird native to South America. It belongs to the genus Xiphorhynchus in the woodcreeper subfamily, Dendrocolaptinae. It is usually regarded as a subspecies of the ocellated woodcreeper (X. ocellatus). It is named after Johann Jakob von Tschudi, the Swiss explorer and naturalist who first described the bird.

== Taxonomy ==
Tschudi's woodcreeper was initially described as a species by Johann Jakob von Tschudi in 1844. He named it Dendrocolaptes Chunchotambo but it was later moved to the genus Xiphorhynchus. It was later lumped into the ocellated woodcreeper (X. ocellatus) but Aleixo (2002) recommended splitting the species based on a study of mitochondrial DNA which showed that the ocellated woodcreeper was more closely related to the chestnut-rumped woodcreeper (X. pardalotus) than to Tschudi's woodcreeper.

However, the South American Classification Committee of the American Ornithological Society and the Clements taxonomy never accepted the split. The International Ornithological Committee (IOC) did accept it but in July 2023 reversed itself and lumped Tschudi's back into the ocellated woodcreeper. BirdLife International's Handbook of the Birds of the World (HBW) does retain Tschudi's woodcreeper as a separate species, X. chunchotambo.

HBW assigns three subspecies to Tschudi's woodcreeper: X. c. chunchotambo, X. c. brevirostris, and X. c. napensis. The other three taxonomic systems treat these taxa as subspecies of the ocellated woodcreeper.

== Description ==
It is a medium-sized woodcreeper, 20–21 cm in length. The bill is fairly long and slightly curved. The plumage is mostly brown, becoming more rufous on the rump, wings and tail. The bird has a buff throat, buff spots on the crown and breast, fine buff streaks on the back and a black moustachial stripe.

The song is a descending series of staccato notes. It calls include a short descending whistle, a quavering liquid call and a dry rattle.

== Distribution and habitat ==
It is found along the east Andean slope and adjacent Amazonian lowlands from southern Colombia south through Ecuador and Peru to northern Bolivia and far south-western Brazil. X. o. chunchotambo occurs in central Peru, X. o. brevirostris in south-east Peru, northern Bolivia and south-western Brazil, and X. o. napensis in southern Colombia, eastern Ecuador and north-east Peru. It is found in humid forests where it forages in the lower and middle storeys of the forest, often in mixed-species feeding flocks.
