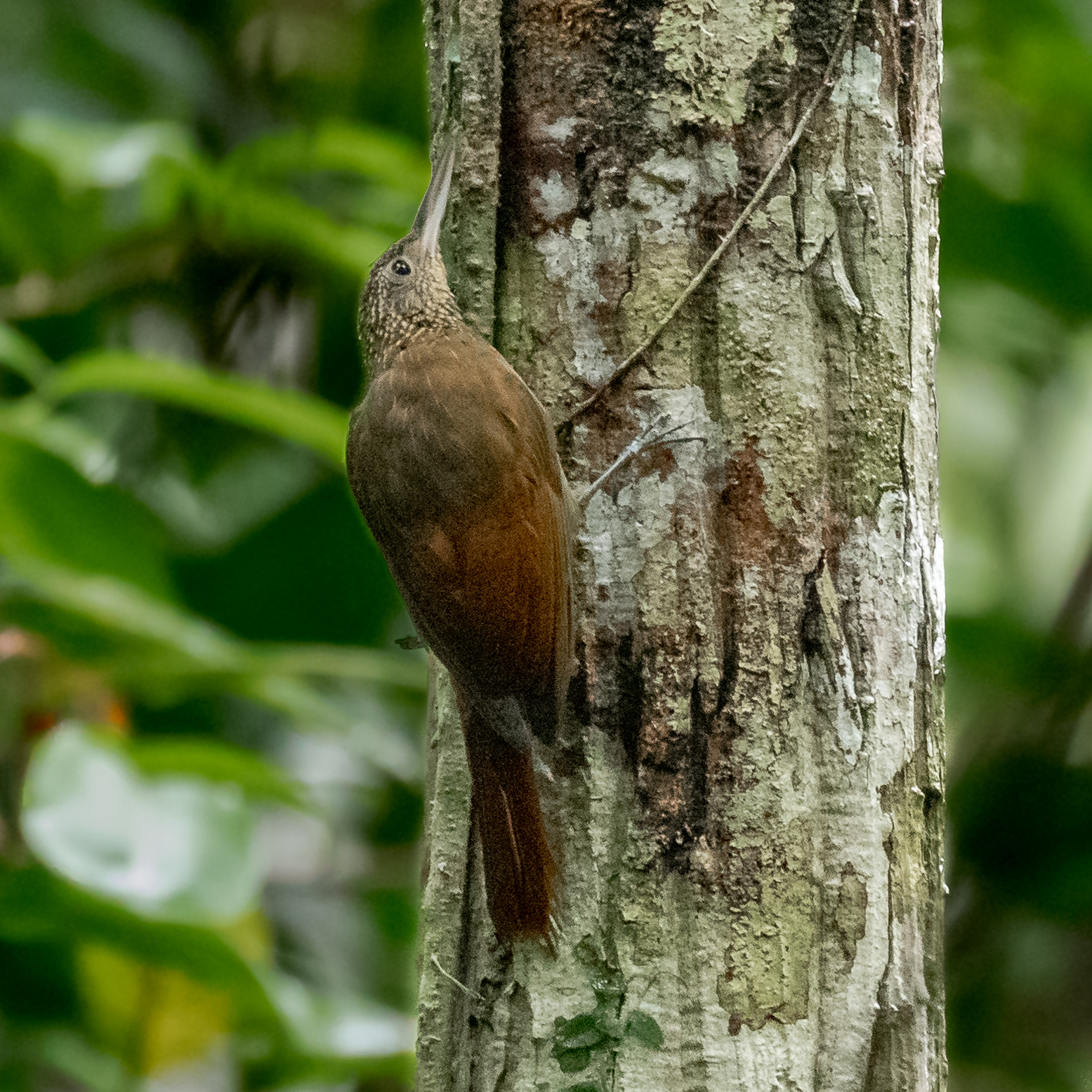
- Line-crowned woodcreeper (Xiphorhynchus beauperthuysii), in Manacapuru, Amazons, Brazil.

Conservation status
- Least Concern (IUCN 3.1)

Scientific classification
- Kingdom: Animalia
- Phylum: Chordata
- Class: Aves
- Order: Passeriformes
- Family: Furnariidae
- Genus: Xiphorhynchus
- Species: X. ocellatus
- Subspecies: X. o. beauperthuysii

Trinomial name
- Xiphorhynchus ocellatus beauperthuysii (Pucheran & Lafresnaye, 1850)
- Geographic distribution of the line-crowned woodcreeper

Synonyms
- Nasica beauperthuysii (protonym); Xiphorhynchus ocellatus beauperthuysii (Pucheran & Lafresnaye, 1850); Dendrornis weddellii Des Murs, 1856; Xiphorhynchus ocellatus weddellii (Des Murs, 1856)

= Line-crowned woodcreeper =

Subspecies of birds

The line-crowned woodcreeper (Xiphorhynchus ocellatus beauperthuysii) is a subspecies of the ocellated woodcreeper, a species of passerine birds in the family Furnariidae, pertaining to the large genus Xiphorhynchus. It is native to the northwest region of the Amazon basin in South America.

== Distribution and habitat ==
Xiphorhynchus ocellatus beauperthuysii has a distribution that ranges from the northeastern Amazon north of the Amazon River, to the east and southeast of Colombia, the extreme south of Venezuela (southwest of Amazonas), the eastern regions of Ecuador, the northeast of Peru and northwestern Brazil, east to the Rio Negro.

Its natural habitat is the understory and the middle strata of moist broadleaf forests; in the majority of its localities, it is found in tall trees of terra firme (Note: Upland forests that do not flood in the northern regions of the Amazon basin.) forests.

== Systematics ==
=== Original description ===
Xiphorhynchus ocellatus beauperthuysii was first described by the French naturalists Jacques Pucheran and Frédéric de Lafresnaye in 1850 under the scientific name Nasica beauperthuysii. Its type locality is 'Amazonum Ripas', or the Peruvian Amazon.

=== Etymology ===
The masculine generic name Xiphorhynchus is composed of the Greek words "ξιφος, xiphos": sword, and "ῥυγχος, rhunkhos": the snout; meaning "with a beak in the shape of a sword". The specific name beauperthuysii commemorates the French microbiologist Louis Daniel Beauperthuy Desbonnes (1807–1871).

=== Taxonomy ===
The taxa is currently treated as the subspecies X. ocellatus beauperthuysii of the ocellated woodcreeper (Xiphorhynchus ocellatus), which is identified in the southern regions of the Amazon river as based on its initial classifications, but at one point was recognized as a separate species by Birds of the World (HBW), Birdlife International (BLI) and the Comité Brasileño de Registros Ornitológicos (CBRO), based on the significant genetic divergences encountered in a multilocular phylogenetic analysis of Xiphorhynchus pardalotus/ocellatus completed by Sousa-Neves et al (2013). However, the separation of species was not recognized by the Comité de Clasificación de Sudamérica (SACC), which declined Proposition N° 600 that proposed the separation of X. ocellatus into three species, citing insufficient published data.

The main reason cited by Birds of the World justifying the separation of species, apart from genetic evidence, is the notable differences in vocalization between birds in the north and birds in the south of the Amazon River.

The epithet beauperthuysii replaces the previously used name weddellii, since the latter had a vaguely defined type locality, which would later be used to refer to X. ocellatus.

=== Subspecies ===
According to Birds of the World, two subspecies of X. ocellatus that may be termed as "line-crowned woodcreepers" are recognized. The subspecies Xiphorhynchus ocellatus lineatocapilla has an uncertain distribution known only from its holotype; the type is said to have been collected from Ciudad Bolívar in Venezuela, but this is most likely wrong.
