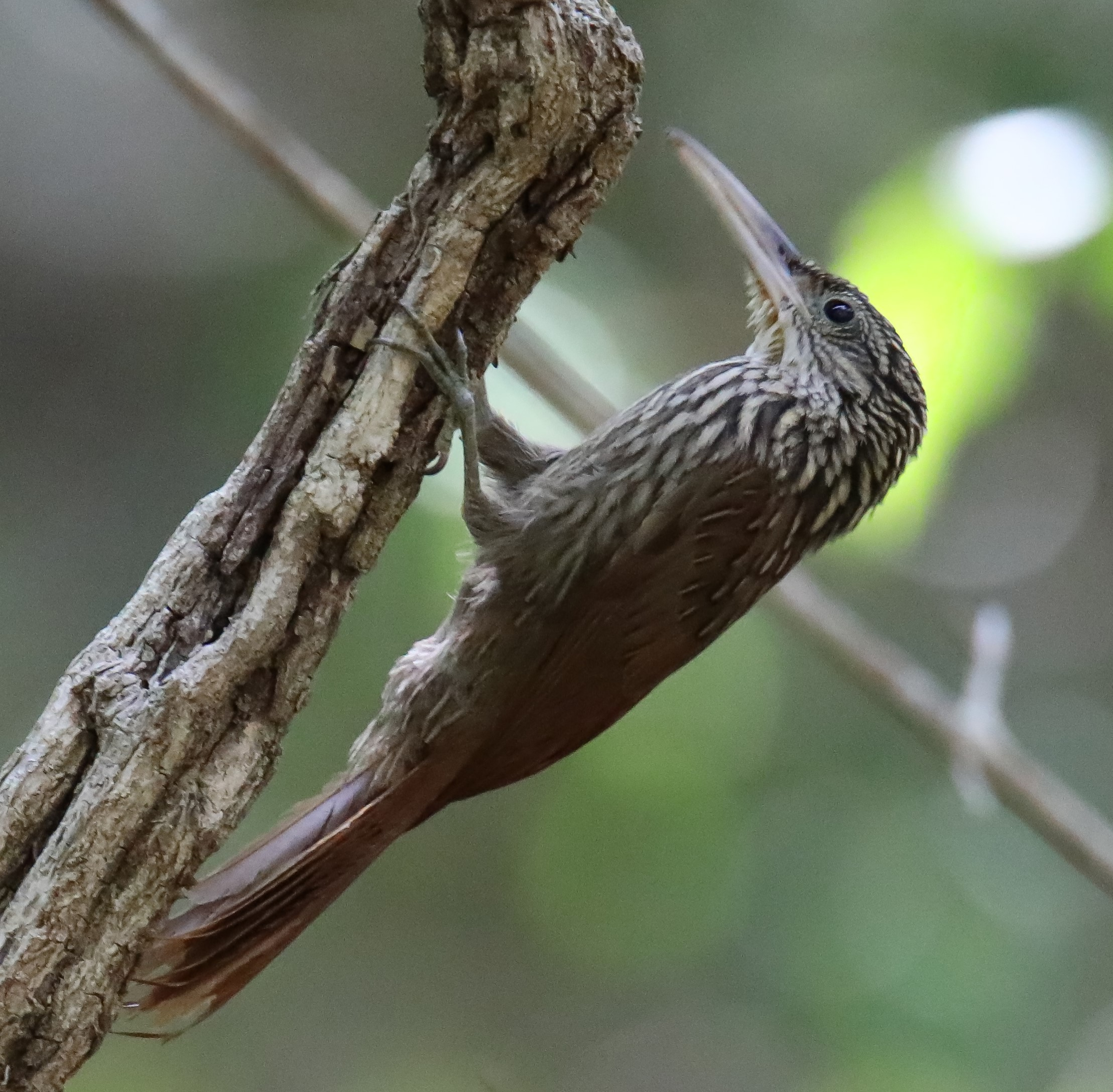

Conservation status
- Least Concern (IUCN 3.1)

Scientific classification
- Kingdom: Animalia
- Phylum: Chordata
- Class: Aves
- Order: Passeriformes
- Family: Furnariidae
- Genus: Xiphorhynchus
- Species: X. flavigaster

Binomial name
- Xiphorhynchus flavigaster Swainson, 1827

= Ivory-billed woodcreeper =

Species of bird

The ivory-billed woodcreeper (Xiphorhynchus flavigaster) is a species of bird in the subfamily Dendrocolaptinae of the ovenbird family Furnariidae. It is found in Belize, Costa Rica, El Salvador, Guatemala, Honduras, Mexico, and Nicaragua.

== Taxonomy and systematics ==
The ivory-billed woodcreeper has these eight subspecies:

- X. f. tardus Bangs & Peters, JL, 1928
- X. f. mentalis (Baird, SF, 1867)
- X. f. flavigaster Swainson, 1827
- X. f. saltuarius Wetmore, 1942
- X. f. yucatanensis Ridgway, 1909
- X. f. ascensor Wetmore & Parkes, 1962
- X. f. eburneirostris (Des Murs, 1847)
- X. f. ultimus Bangs & Griscom, 1932

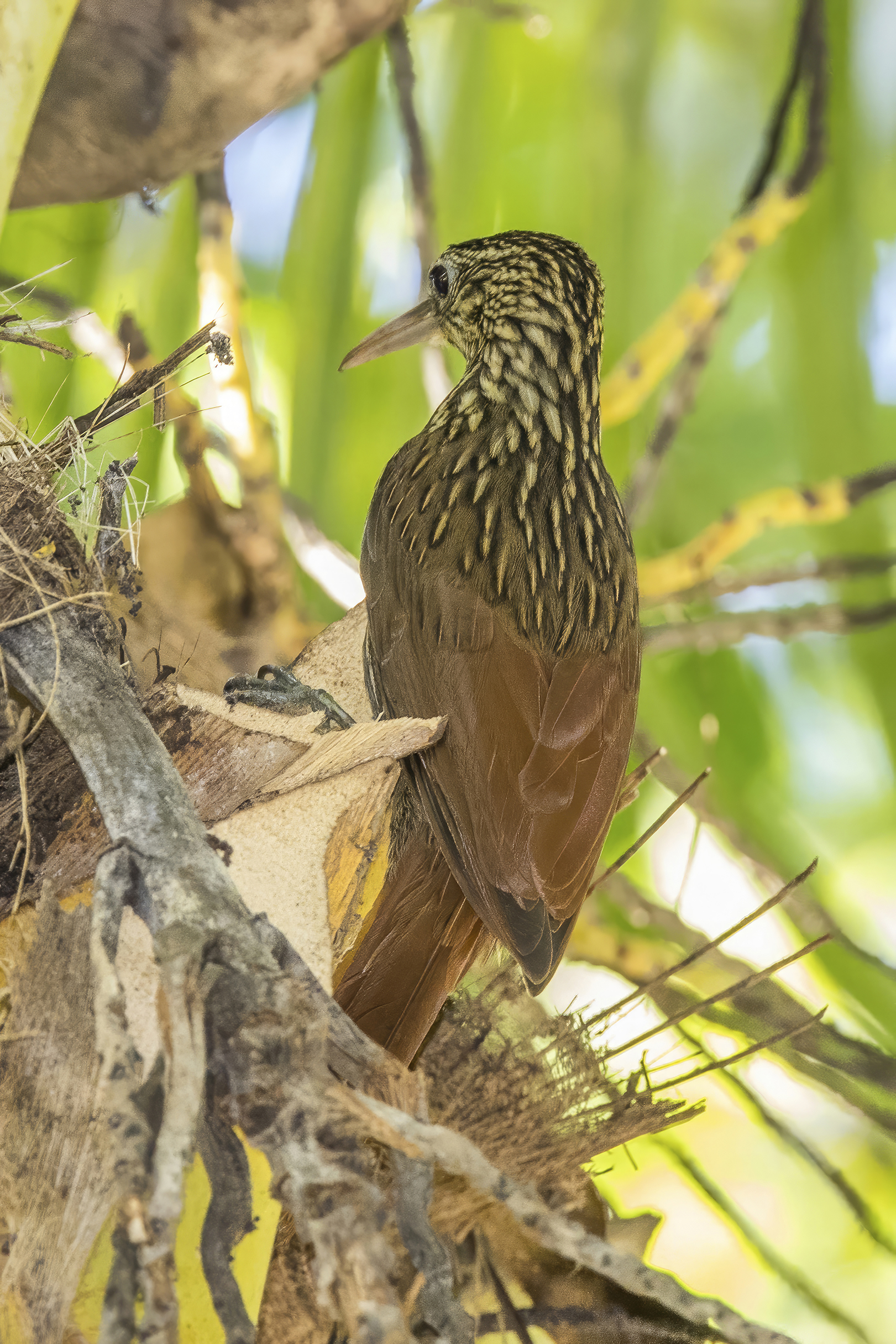
X. f. eburneirostris showing back pattern

== Description ==
The ivory-billed woodcreeper is 20 to 26.5 cm (7.9 to 10 in) long. Males weigh 40 to 62 g (1.4 to 2.2 oz) and females 35 to 56 g (1.2 to 2.0 oz). It is a medium-sized member of genus Xiphorhynchus, with a long, fairly heavy, slightly decurved bill. The sexes have the same plumage. Adults of the nominate subspecies X. f. flavigaster have a face with fine buffy and blackish streaks, an indistinct buffy supercilium and eyering, and a faint dark stripe behind the eye. Their crown and nape are dark grayish brown with longish buff spots that are almost streaks. Their back and wing coverts are light grayish brown to olive-brown with blackish-edged buff streaks. Their rump, tail, and wings are chestnut. Their flight feathers are paler than the tail, with dusky tips on the outer primaries. Their throat is buffy with thin dusky streaks. Their upper breast is lighter than their throat and has a scaly appearance. The rest of their underparts are light buffy brown with dusky-edged buffy streaks that lessen to the belly. Their underwing coverts are ochraceous buff. Their iris is light reddish brown to dark brown, their bill pale with a brownish or bluish base to the maxilla, and their legs and feet yellowish green, olive-gray, or brownish. Juveniles are overall slightly darker than adults, with bolder streaks on the throat, duller streaks on the back and breast, and a brownish bill.

The other subspecies of the ivory-billed woodcreeper differ from the nominate and each other thus:

- X. f. tardus, much smaller, paler, and grayer than nominate
- X. f. mentalis, smaller with a shorter bill than nominate
- X. f. saltuarius, darker and browner than nominate but paler than eburneirostris especially on belly, larger and bolder upperparts streaks, less well defined underparts streaks
- X. f. yucatanensis, smaller than mentalis with pale buff unmarked throat
- X. f. ascensor, overall darkest of all subspecies, richer brown above, streaked (not spotted) crown, wings and tail deep chestnut, all streaks wider with wider black edges, streaks extend onto belly
- X. f. eburneirostris, darker and browner than nominate, crown and nape sooty black, richer buff streaks above and below, throat has only fine streaks at edge
- X. f. ultimus, larger and darker than eburneirostris, richer buff underparts, blacker edges on underparts streaks, longer and heavier bill

The subspecies have much individual variation that leads to weak differentiation among some of them. Most adjoining subspecies have intergrades.

== Distribution and habitat ==
The subspecies of the ivory-billed woodcreeper are found thus:

- X. f. tardus, the northwestern Mexican states of Sonora, Sinaloa, and Durango
- X. f. mentalis, the Pacific side of Mexico from Sinaloa and Durango south into Guerrero
- X. f. flavigaster Guerrero and Oaxaca in southwestern Mexico
- X. f. saltuarius, northeastern Mexico from Tamaulipas and San Luis Potosí south into Veracruz
- X. f. yucatanensis, the Yucatán Peninsula and south into Belize and Guatemala
- X. f. ascensor, Caribbean side of southern Mexico from Veracruz and Oaxaca to Tabasco and possibly into Guatemala
- X. f. eburneirostris, Caribbean slope from central Guatemala and Belize through Honduras slightly into Costa Rica, and the Pacific slope from Oaxaca and Chiapas in Mexico through Guatemala, El Salvador, and Honduras into northwestern Costa Rica
- X. f. ultimus, Costa Rica's Nicoya Peninsula

The ivory-billed woodcreeper inhabits a variety of forested landscapes. It favors deciduous woodland and also occurs in semi-deciduous forest, evergreen forest, gallery forest, pine-oak and pine forest, thorn scrub, freshwater swamps, and mangroves. It inhabits the interior and edges of both primary and secondary forest and also plantations. It tends to be in drier landscapes than many other woodcreepers. In elevation it mostly occurs from sea level to about 1,500 m (4,900 ft) but locally ranges up to 2,900 m (9,500 ft).

== Behavior ==
=== Movement ===
The ivory-billed woodcreeper is believed to be a year-round resident throughout its range, though some may move to higher elevations after breeding.

=== Feeding ===
The ivory-billed woodcreeper's diet is mostly arthropods but also includes other invertebrates such as snails and small vertebrates, especially lizards. It usually forages singly, though sometimes in pairs, and regularly joins mixed-species feeding flocks and follows army ant swarms. Away from ants it usually forages from the forest's mid-level to the subcanopy but will go higher and lower. It hitches up trunks and along branches, often in a spiral and sometimes on the underside of branches. Most prey is taken by probing bark crevices, bromeliads, and epiphytes. It sometimes flakes off bark. When attending army ants it perches low and drops to the ground to catch prey disturbed by them.

=== Breeding ===
The ivory-billed woodcreeper's breeding season appears to be March to August. It nests in a cavity or in a gap between Ficus roots and lines the nest with wood or bark chips or softer plant material. The clutch size is two to three eggs. The incubation period, time to fledging, and details of parental care are not known.

=== Vocalization ===
The ivory-billed woodcreeper's song in western Mexico is "piercing whistles in loud cascade that first ascends slightly and increases in volume before descending and slowing, 't-t-t-ttttttttt-t-tewtewtew-tew-tew' ". In northern Central America it is "a rapid trill, descending slightly in pitch at end" and in Costa Rica "a loud, laughing, descending whinny. Its calls include "tchee-oo", "skweeú", "squirp", and "tyew-tyew-tyew".

== Status ==
The IUCN has assessed the ivory-billed woodcreeper as being of Least Concern. It has a very large range and an estimated population of at least 500,000 mature individuals. The latter, however, is believed to be decreasing. No immediate threats have been identified. It is considered fairly common to common in most of its range but scarce in the far north and "fairly uncommon" in Costa Rica. "A generalist species, frequenting both open and closed environments; far less dependent on true forest than are most woodcreepers...appears only moderately sensitive to human disturbance, provided that patches of forest remain".
