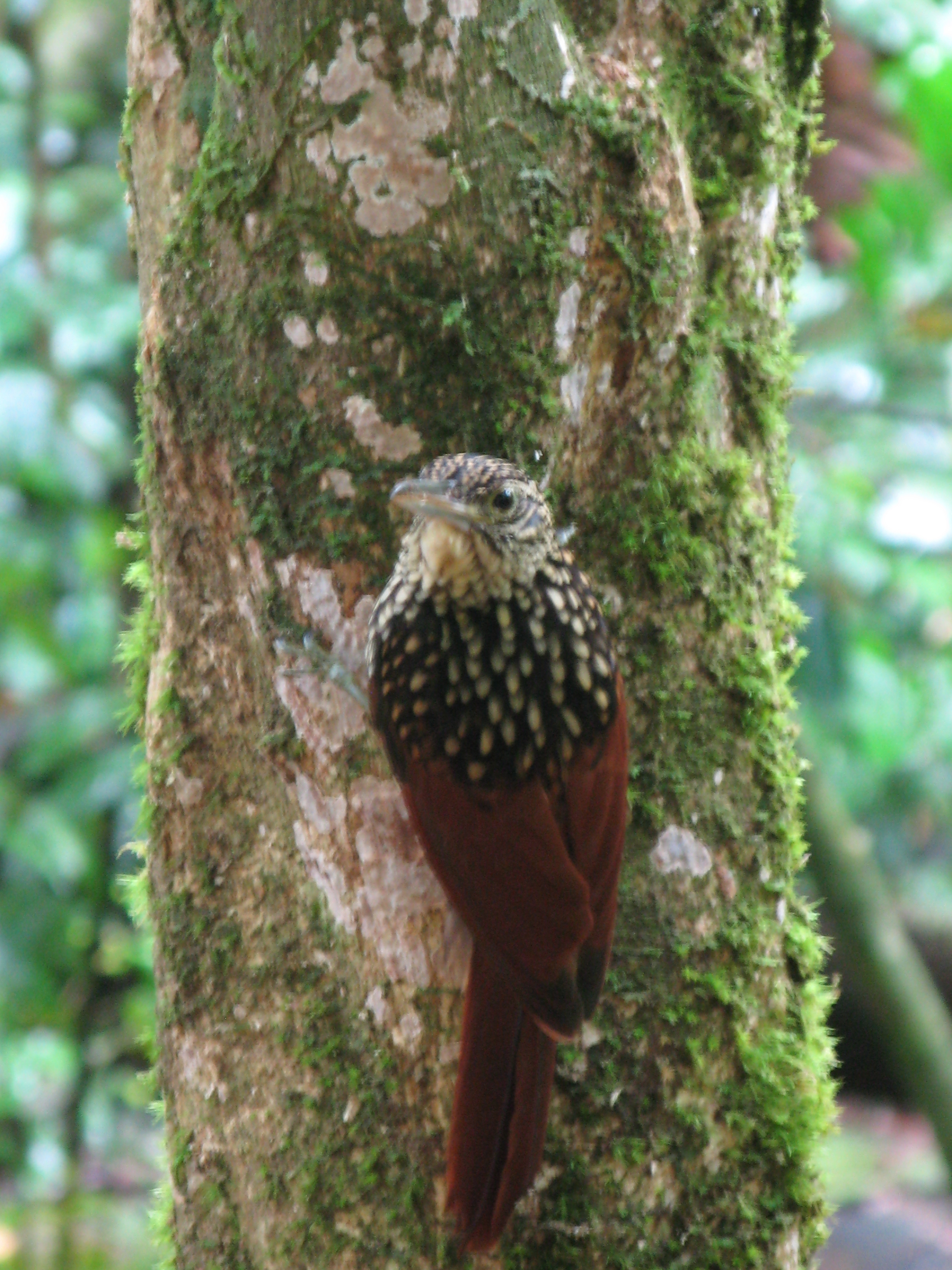

Conservation status
- Least Concern (IUCN 3.1)

Scientific classification
- Kingdom: Animalia
- Phylum: Chordata
- Class: Aves
- Order: Passeriformes
- Family: Furnariidae
- Genus: Xiphorhynchus
- Species: X. lachrymosus

Binomial name
- Xiphorhynchus lachrymosus (Lawrence, 1862)

Audio

= Black-striped woodcreeper =

Species of bird

The black-striped woodcreeper (Xiphorhynchus lachrymosus) is a species of bird in the subfamily Dendrocolaptinae of the ovenbird family Furnariidae. It is found in Colombia, Costa Rica, Ecuador, Nicaragua, and Panama.

== Taxonomy and systematics ==
The black-striped woodcreeper has three subspecies, the nominate X. l. lachrymosus (Lawrence, 1862), X. l. eximius (Hellmayr, 1904), and X. l. alarum (Chapman, 1915).

== Description ==
The black-striped woodcreeper is 21.5 to 25 cm (8.5 to 9.8 in) long and weighs 51 to 66 g (1.8 to 2.3 oz). It is a medium-sized member of genus Xiphorhynchus, with a longish, nearly straight, bill with a slight droop at the tip. The sexes have the same plumage. Adults of the nominate subspecies have a brownish black face with buff streaks and no distinct supercilium. Their crown and nape are brownish black with buffy teardrop spots and wide streaks. Their back and scapulars are also brownish black with wider and deeper buff streaks. Their lower back, rump, and wings are dark cinnamon-rufous, with dusky tips on the outer primaries. Their inner wing coverts are also dark cinnamon-rufous and the outer coverts browish black with paler streaks. Their tail is rufous-chestnut. Their throat is pale to deep buff with a thin black lower edge. Their breast and belly are pale buff with a scaly appearance on the former and streaks on the latter. Their sides and flanks are grayish brown with faint streaks, their undertail coverts brownish with pale buff streaks, and their underwing coverts deep ochraceous buff to tawny buff. Their iris is dark reddish brown to dark brown, their maxilla dark brown to black, their mandible silver-gray to bluish white, and their legs and feet green to bluish gray or dark gray. Juveniles are similar to adults with a more muted pattern; the black feather edges are browner, their throat has heavier scaling, their underparts are whiter, and their bill is shorter.

Subspecies X. l. eximius has more distinct black streaking than the nominate on the breast and it extends through the belly. Their upper back has more blackish on the streaks and their wings and tail are deeper rufous. X. l. alarum has smaller buffy spots on the back than the nominate, with narrow black and wider dark brown edges. Their greater wing coverts have brown rather than black inner webs, and their underparts' spots are smaller.

The black-striped woodcreeper's combination of size and pattern of pale buff and black streaks is unique among woodcreepers.

== Distribution and habitat ==
The nominate subspecies of the black-striped woodcreeper is found on the Caribbean slope from eastern Nicaragua through Costa Rica and Panama, and also on the Pacific slope from the Canal Zone through western Colombia into Ecuador as far as Pichincha Province. Subspecies X. l. eximius is found on the Pacific slope of southwestern Costa Rica and western Panama. X. l. alarum is found in Colombia, from the valleys of the Sinú, Cauca, and Magdalena rivers east into Santander Department.

The black-striped woodcreeper mostly inhabits humid lowland forest. It favors evergreen forest but also entends into mangroves in some areas. It also favors the interior of tall mature forest but is regular at its edges and gaps, in older secondary forest, and occasionally in tree plantations. In elevation it mostly ranges between sea level and 1,000 m (3,300 ft) but reaches 1,200 m (3,900 ft) in Costa Rica and 1,500 m (4,900 ft) in Colombia.

== Behavior ==
=== Movement ===
The black-striped woodcreeper is a year-round resident throughout its range.

=== Feeding ===
The black-striped woodcreeper's diet is mostly arthropods but also includes small vertebrates such as lizards. It usually forages singly, though sometimes in pairs or more rarely in family groups. It will join mixed-species feeding flocks but does so less than other Xiphorhynchus woodcreepers. With flocks it usually feeds in the forest canopy and somewhat lower when away from them. It hitches up trunks and along branches, usually in a spiral but also creeping along large limbs. Most prey is taken by probing bark crevices, vine tangles, dead leaf clusters, bromeliads, and epiphytes. It also sometimes sallies for flying prey. It regularly follows army ant swarms, staying fairly low and usually capturing prey directly from leaves, trunks, and vines and seldom if ever from the ground.

=== Breeding ===
The black-striped woodcreeper breeds between March and June in Costa Rica and between February and May in Colombia. It nests in a tree or palm cavity that it lines with wood and bark chips. The clutch size is usually two eggs though apparently sometimes three. The incubation period, time to fledging, and details of parental care are not known.

=== Vocalization ===
The black-striped woodcreeper's song is "a soft, descending whinny...clear whistles that begin slowly, speed up, then slow at end, 'wi, di, di, di, di-di-di-di-di-di, di, di, dew'." Its calls include " descending whistles with laughing quality, described as 'wheep-weep-whup', 'weé-hir-hir' or 'weé, ha-há'; also a loud emphatic 'doweeet' or 'choo-reep' with upward inflection, a descending 'cheer' or 'chirrrw' with rolling quality and, when agitated, a rapid series of sharp notes that rise and fall in frequency and speed, and vary from clear whistled 'weet' to harsh 'wik'."

== Status ==
The IUCN has assessed the black-striped woodcreeper as being of Least Concern. It has a large range and an estimated population of at least 50,000 mature individuals, though the latter is believed to be decreasing. No immediate threats have been identified. It is considered uncommon to common in most of its range, and locally common. It "[r]equires relatively continuous forest with tall trees and, therefore, [is] believed to be at least moderately sensitive to forest fragmentation and other forms of human disturbance."
