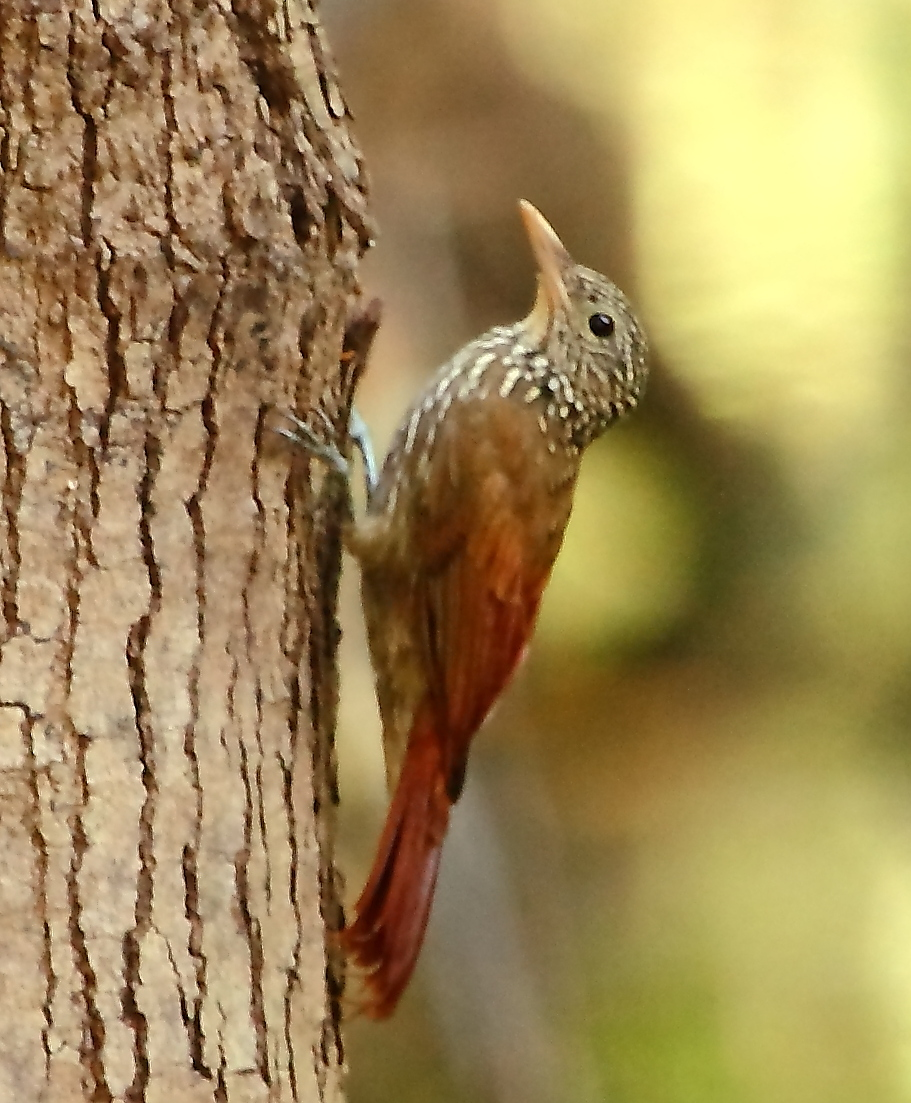
- at Manacapuru, Amazonas state, Brazil

Conservation status
- Least Concern (IUCN 3.1)

Scientific classification
- Kingdom: Animalia
- Phylum: Chordata
- Class: Aves
- Order: Passeriformes
- Family: Furnariidae
- Genus: Xiphorhynchus
- Species: X. obsoletus

Binomial name
- Xiphorhynchus obsoletus (Lichtenstein, MHC, 1820)

= Striped woodcreeper =

Species of bird

The striped woodcreeper (Xiphorhynchus obsoletus) is a species of bird in the subfamily Dendrocolaptinae of the ovenbird family Furnariidae. It is found in Bolivia, Brazil, Colombia, Ecuador, French Guiana, Guyana, Peru, Suriname, and Venezuela.

== Taxonomy and systematics ==
The striped woodcreeper has these four subspecies:

- X. o. palliatus (Des Murs, 1856)
- X. o. notatus (Eyton, 1852)
- X. o. obsoletus (Lichtenstein, MHC, 1820)
- X. o. caicarae Zimmer, JT & Phelps, WH, 1955

Some doubt exists that X. o. caicarae is a valid subspecies.

== Description ==
The striped woodcreeper is medium-sized, with a slim, slightly decurved bill of moderate length. The species is 18 to 20.5 cm (7.1 to 8.1 in) long. Males weigh 27 to 37 g (0.95 to 1.3 oz) and females 24 to 36 g (0.85 to 1.3 oz). The sexes have the same plumage. Adults of the nominate subspecies X. o. obsoletus have a face with thin creamy buff and dark brown streaks that become bold scaling on the sides of the neck. They have a faint pale supercilium or none at all. Their crown and nape are blackish to dark olive-brown with pale spots that have dusky edges. Their back is olive-brown with dusky-edged whitish buff streaks. Their rump, wings, and tail are cinnamon-rufous to rufous-chestnut, with dusky to dark brown tips on the primaries. Their throat is buffy white, sometimes with a faint scaly appearance. Their underparts are grayish olive-brown and sometimes have a rufescent cast; they have buffy-white streaks with black edges that are bold on the breast and weaker on the lower belly and undertail coverts. Their iris is brown to dark brown, their maxilla pale brownish to grayish-horn with a darker base, their mandible pale bluish gray to light brown, and their legs and feet shades of gray or dark brown. Juveniles are similar to adults but with less well defined dark edges to their spots and streaks.

Subspecies X. o. notatus is more rufescent than the nominate; its throat and streaks are a deeper buff to ochraceous and its streaks are finer. X. o. palliatus is even more rufescent; its streaks are more deeply colored and its back and rump are closer in color to each other than are the nominate's. X. o. caicarae is the smallest subspecies and has browner (less grayish) underparts and a shorter bill than the nominate.

The subspecies intergrade in their contact zones.

== Distribution and habitat ==
The subspecies of the striped woodcreeper are found thus:

- X. o. palliatus, the Amazon Basin in southeastern Colombia, eastern Ecuador, eastern Peru, northern Bolivia, and western Brazil east to the Rio Negro
- X. o. notatus, eastern Colombia's Arauca and Vichada departments, western and southern Venezuela, and northwestern Brazil
- X. o. obsoletus, the Amazon basin of northeastern and eastern Venezuela, the Guianas, northeastern Bolivia, and Brazil east of the Rio Negro and south to Mato Grosso
- X. o. caicarae, middle reaches of the Rio Orinoco in central Venezuela's Bolívar state

The striped woodcreeper is primarily a bird of mature evergreen forest, and favors landscapes near water. These include várzea, igapó, and swamp forest, and river islands. It occurs less frequently in terra firme and secondary forest. In the southern part of its range it occurs in gallery forest within the cerrado. It is entirely a bird of the lowlands, being found only below 500 m (1,600 ft).

== Behavior ==
=== Movement ===
The striped woodcreeper is a year-round resident throughout its range.

=== Feeding ===
The striped woodcreeper's diet is mostly insects and other arthropods such as spiders. It usually forages singly but sometimes in pairs, and at all levels of the forest up to the subcanopy. It sometimes joins mixed-species feeding flocks and is not known to follow army ant swarms. It hitches up trunks and branches, sometimes on the underside of the latter, and gleans, probes, and pecks for prey. It also takes a significant part of its prey by mid-air capture during sallies from a perch.

=== Breeding ===
The striped woodcreeper's breeding season is not well defined but appears to vary somewhat geographically. It nests in cavities, such as in a stump, and also in nests of arboreal termites. The clutch size is two eggs. The incubation period, time to fledging, and details of parental care are not known.

=== Vocalization ===
The striped woodcreeper sings mostly at dawn and dusk, and also intermittently during the day. Its song is "a trill...20–35 sharp notes, first stuttering, then speeding up slightly, rises conspicuously at end, 'che-e-e-e-e-e-ee-ie-ie-iek!'." Its calls include "sip", "ti-dik", and a "dry twittering 'tit-it-it' or 'si-si-sip' ".

== Status ==
The IUCN has assessed the striped woodcreeper as being of Least Concern. It has a very large range but its population size is not known and is believed to be decreasing. No immediate threats have been identified. It is considered uncommon to fairly common in much of its range but only rare and local at its periphery. It is "[b]elieved to be at least moderately sensitive to loss and fragmentation of forest; successional nature of its habitat, however, suggests greater tolerance of modification than is shown by most terra firme species."
