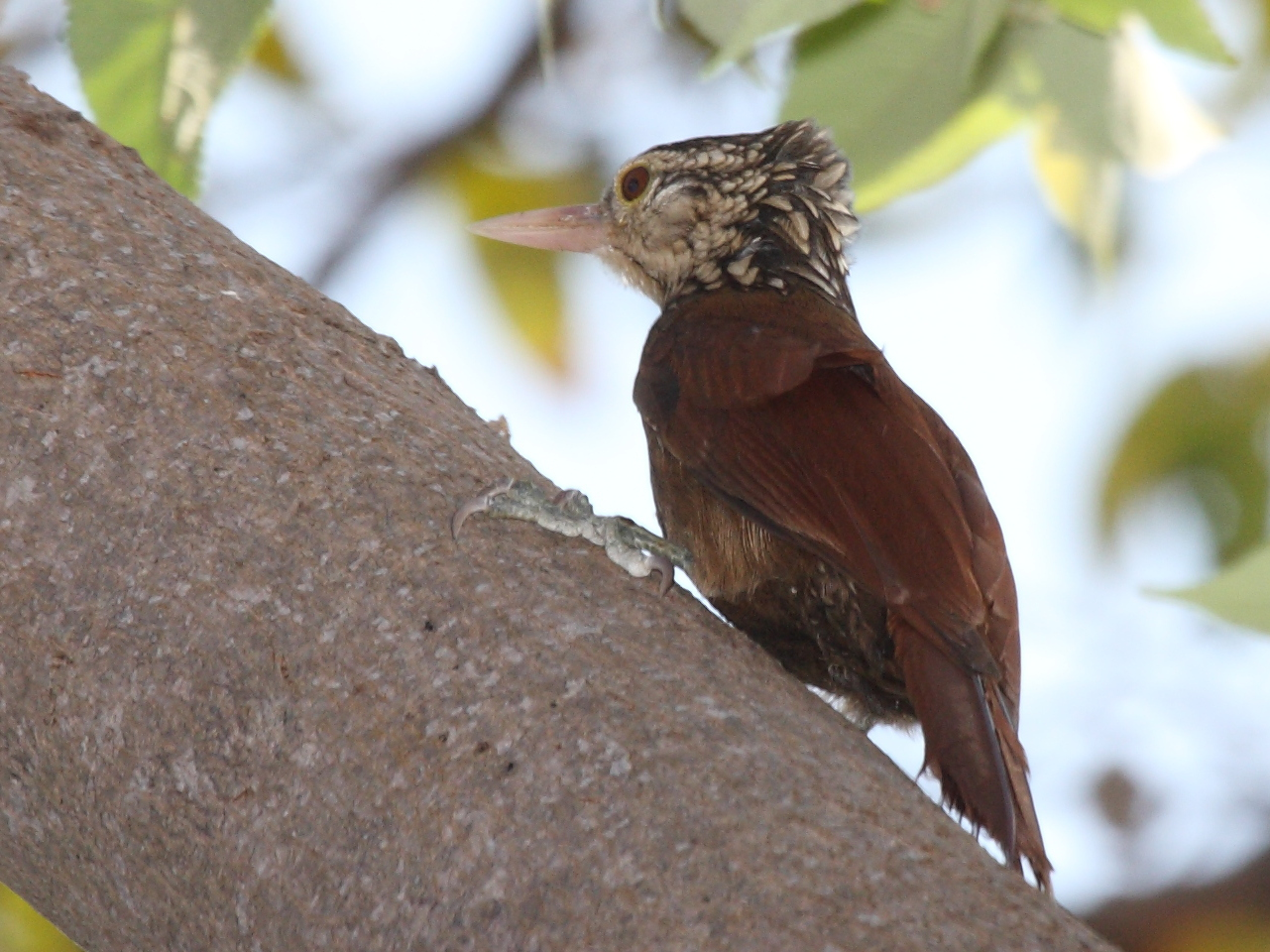
- Straight-billed woodcreeper (Dendroplex picus)

Scientific classification
- Kingdom: Animalia
- Phylum: Chordata
- Class: Aves
- Order: Passeriformes
- Family: Furnariidae
- Subfamily: Dendrocolaptinae
- Genus: Dendroplex; Swainson, 1827

Type species
- Oriolus picus Gmelin, JF, 1788

Species
- Dendroplex kienerii Dendroplex picus

= Dendroplex =

Genus of birds

Dendroplex is a genus of birds in the woodcreeper subfamily Dendrocolaptinae. It was long merged into Xiphorhynchus, but its distinctness has now been established.

== Taxonomy ==
The genus Dendroplex was introduced in 1827 by the English naturalist William Swainson. The genus name combines the Ancient Greek dendron meaning "tree" with plēssō meaning "to strike". Swainson did not specify a type species but this was fixed in 2007 as the straight-billed woodcreeper which had first been described in 1788 by Johann Friedrich Gmelin with the binomial name Oriolus picus.

The genus contains two species:

Genus Dendroplex – Swainson, 1827 – Two species
Common name	Scientific name and subspecies	Range	Size and ecology	IUCN status and estimated population
Straight-billed woodcreeper	Dendroplex picus (Gmelin, JF, 1788) Thirteen subspecies: D. p. extimus Griscom, 1927; D. p. dugandi Wetmore & Phelps, WH, 1946; D. p. picirostris Lafresnaye, 1847; D. p. saturatior Hellmayr, 1925; D. p. choicus Wetmore & Phelps, WH, 1946; D. p. paraguanae (Phelps, WH & Phelps, WH Jr, 1962); D. p. longirostris Richmond, 1896; D. p. altirostris (Léotaud, 1866); D. p. phalarus Wetmore, 1939; D. p. deltanus (Phelps, WH & Phelps, WH Jr, 1952); D. p. picus (Gmelin, JF, 1788); D. p. duidae Zimmer, JT, 1934; D. p. peruvianus Zimmer, JT, 1934	Bolivia, Brazil, Colombia, Ecuador, French Guiana, Guyana, Panama, Peru, Suriname, Trinidad and Tobago, and Venezuela.	Size: Habitat: Diet:	LC
Zimmer's woodcreeper	Dendroplex kienerii (des Murs, 1856)	Amazon river and tributaries	Size: Habitat: Diet:	LC
