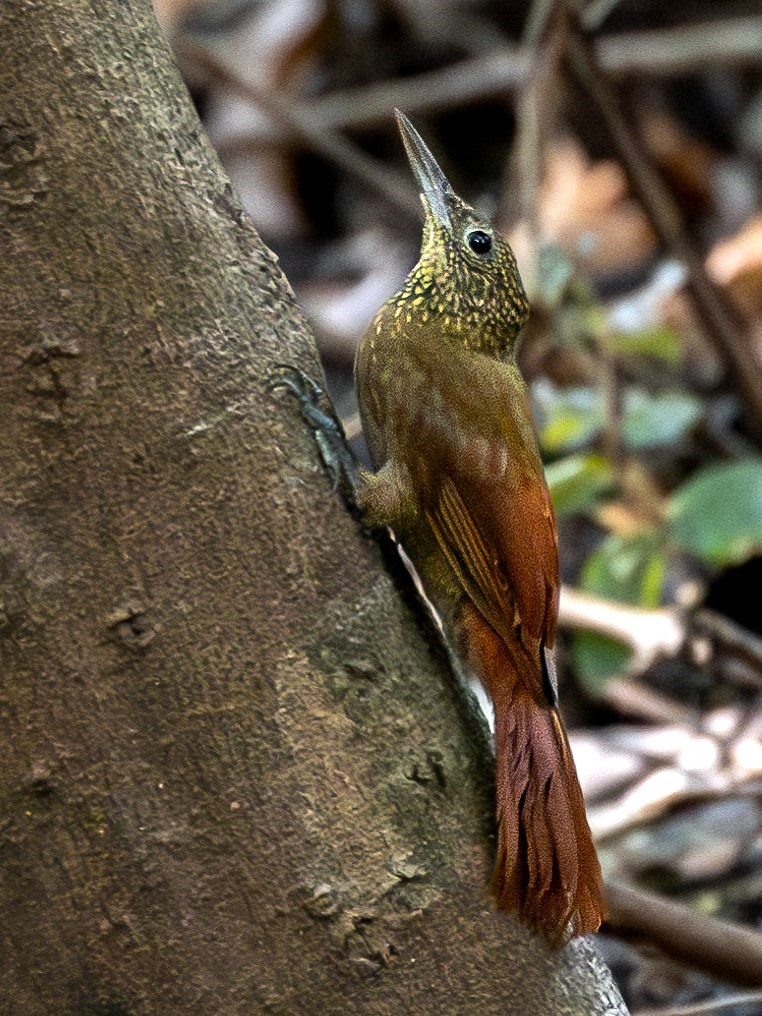

Conservation status
- Least Concern (IUCN 3.1)(but see Taxonomy and Status sections)

Scientific classification
- Kingdom: Animalia
- Phylum: Chordata
- Class: Aves
- Order: Passeriformes
- Family: Furnariidae
- Genus: Xiphorhynchus
- Species: X. ocellatus

Binomial name
- Xiphorhynchus ocellatus (Spix, 1824)

= Ocellated woodcreeper =

Species of bird

The ocellated woodcreeper (Xiphorhynchus ocellatus) is a species of bird in the subfamily Dendrocolaptinae of the ovenbird family Furnariidae. It is found in Bolivia, Brazil, Colombia, Ecuador, Peru, and Venezuela.

== Taxonomy and systematics ==
The ocellated woodcreeper's taxonomy is unsettled. The South American Classification Committee of the American Ornithological Society (SACC) and the Clements taxonomy have long treated it as a species with seven subspecies. The International Ornithological Committee (IOC) formerly treated it as a species with four subspecies; the other three were treated as Tschudi's woodcreeper (X. chunchotambo). In July 2023 the IOC lumped Tschudi's into the ocellated woodcreeper, resulting in the same treatment as that of the SACC and Clements.

The seven subspecies recognized by these taxonomic systems are:

- X. o. lineatocapilla (Berlepsch & Leverkühn, 1890)
- X. o. beauperthuysii (Pucheran & Lafresnaye, 1850)
- X. o. perplexus Zimmer, JT, 1934
- X. o. ocellatus (Spix, 1824)
- X. o. napensis Chapman, 1924
- X. o. chunchotambo (Tschudi, 1844)
- X. o. brevirostris Zimmer, JT, 1934

However, BirdLife International's Handbook of the Birds of the World (HBW) considers only X. o. perplexus and X. o. ocellatus as the ocellated woodcreeper. It retains X. o. napensis, X. o. chunchotambo, and X. o. brevirostris as Tschudi's woodcreeper and treats X. o. lineatocapilla and X. o. beauperthuysii as the line-crowned woodcreeper.

This article follows the single species, seven-subspecies, model.

== Description ==
The ocellated woodcreeper is 20 to 24.5 cm (7.9 to 9.6 in) long and weighs 24 to 42 g (0.85 to 1.5 oz). It is a slim, medium-sized woodcreeper with a long and nearly straight bill. The sexes are alike. Adults of the nominate subspecies X. o. ocellatus have a dark brown crown and nape with fine buff streaks on the crown. Their back is plain reddish brown to olive-brown, their rump and wings cinnamon-rufous, and their tail a darker cinnamon-rufous. Their throat is deep buff with darker edges to the feathers. Their underparts are olive-brown that becomes more rufescent on the undertail coverts. Their upper breast has large buff "teardrops" with weak darker borders, their lower breast has weak buff streaks, and their belly is unmarked. Their iris is dark brown, their bill blackish with a pale gray mandible, and their legs and feet gray. Juveniles are similar to adults but with heavier markings on their underparts.

The other subspecies of the ocellated woodcreeper differ from the nominate and each other thus:

- X. o. lineatocapilla: heavier bill, more blackish crown, and less rufescent back than nominate
- X. o. beauperthuysii: similar to lineatocapilla
- X. o. perplexus: darker rufous rump, wings, and tail than nominate; darker breast with more conspicuous dusky borders to the teardrops
- X. o. chunchotambo: blackish brown crown and nape with small buff "teardrops"; thin buff streaks on the back; rufous-chestnut rump and tail; pale buff throat; lower throat appears scaly; underparts have dark-edged teardrops on upper breast and buff streaks on lower breast and belly
- X. o. napensis: compared to chunchotambo, smaller spots on crown, narrower and straighter streaks on back, richer buff throat with more scaling, and less streaking on belly
- X. o. brevirostris: compared to chunchotambo, smaller and browner, wider and more distinct streaks on back, wider but less distinct streaks on underparts, and slimmer, paler, and more curved bill

== Distribution and habitat ==
The subspecies of the ocellated woodcreeper are found thus:

- X. o. lineatocapilla, range not well defined but apparently along the Rio Orinoco in southern Venezuela
- X. o. beauperthuysii, northwestern Amazonia north of the Amazon in southern Colombia, southern Venezuela, northeastern Peru, and northwestern Brazil east to the Rio Negro
- X. o. perplexus, western Amazonia south of the Amazon in northeastern Peru, western Brazil, and extreme northeastern Bolivia
- X. o. ocellatus, Amazonian Brazil south of the Amazon between the Rio Purus and Rio Tapajós
- X. o. napensis, lower slopes of the Andes and adjacent western Amazonia from southern Colombia through Ecuador into northeastern Peru to the Rio Marañón
- X. o. chunchotambo, lower Andean slopes of northeastern and eastern Peru south of the Marañón
- X. o. brevirostris, foothills of the Andes and adjacent Amazonia of southeastern Peru, northern and central Bolivia, and Brazil's Acre state

The ocellated woodcreeper primarily inhabits evergreen forest. Most of the subspecies favor terra firme forest and are also found in várzea, other seasonally flooded forest types, and wooded swamps. The three "Tschudi's" subspecies are found in terra firme but are more common in montane forest and cloudforest. All prefer the interior of mature forest but also occur at its edges and in secondary forest. The species mostly occurs at elevations below 500 m (1,600 ft) but reaches 1,800 m (5,900 ft) in the Andes.

== Behavior ==
=== Movement ===
The ocellated woodcreeper is a year-round resident throughout its range.

=== Feeding ===
The ocellated woodcreeper's diet has not been fully described but is believed to be primarily arthropods. Single birds and pairs frequently join mixed-species foraging flocks and occasionally follow army ant swarms. The species hitches up trunks and along branches, mostly from the forest's understory to its sub-canopy. It takes most of its prey from bark, by picking and probing. It also sometimes probes vegetation like epiphytes.

=== Breeding ===
Essentially nothing is known about the ocellated woodcreeper's breeding biology.

=== Vocalization ===
The ocellated woodcreeper sings mostly at dawn and dusk, and usually gives only a few songs then. Its song varies geographically. For instance, in eastern Ecuador it is "a fast series of nasal notes...'whe-whe-whe-whe-whe-chéchécheow' ". In much of Brazil it is a "short, fast, descending, rattling series of notes" and in other parts "a rapid trill...'re-e-e-e-e-e-e-e-e-e-eet' ". In Peru it is "a quiet, accelerating series...e.g. 'hee-ee-ee-i'i'i'i'i'i' chee'ee'ee tree'ee'ee tree'ee'ee' ". The species also has a wide variety of calls.

== Status ==
The IUCN follows HBW taxonomy and so has separately assessed the ocellated sensu stricto, "line-crowned", and "Tschudi's" woodcreepers. All three are assessed as being of Least Concern. They have large to very large ranges, but their population sizes are not known and all are believed to be decreasing. No immediate threats to any of them have been identified. The species appears to be fairly common to common in most of its range but is "believed to be highly sensitive to loss and fragmentation of forest".
