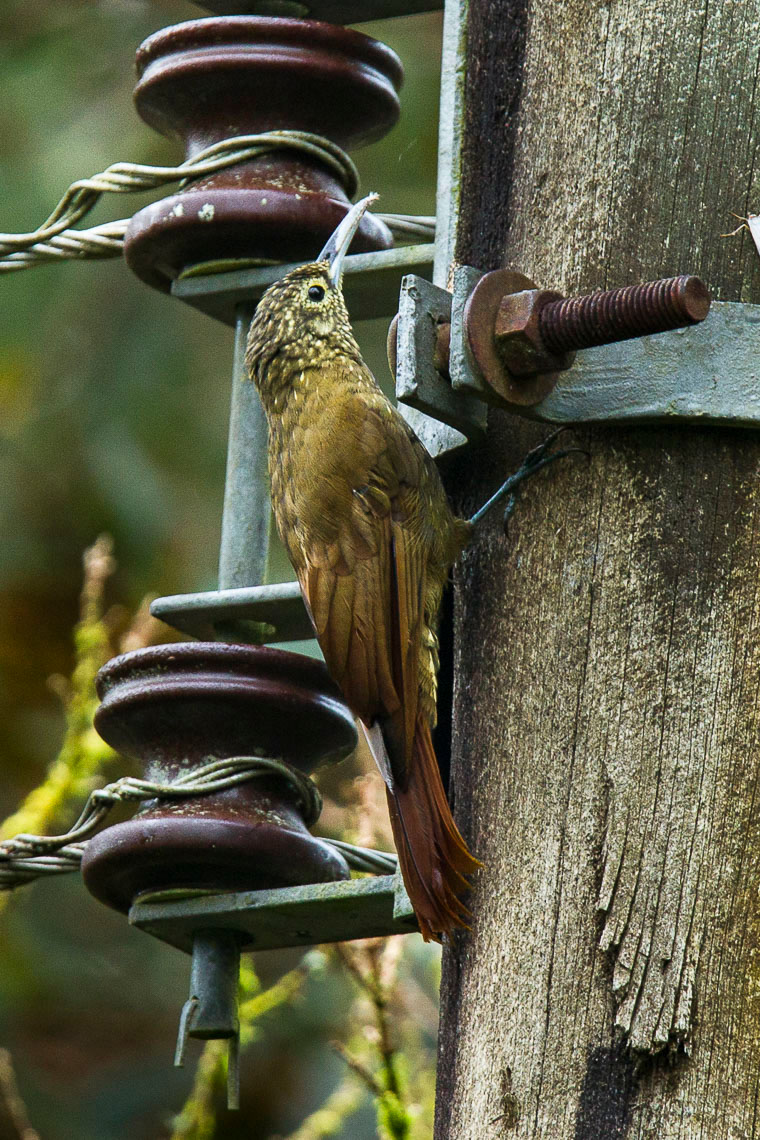

Conservation status
- Least Concern (IUCN 3.1)

Scientific classification
- Kingdom: Animalia
- Phylum: Chordata
- Class: Aves
- Order: Passeriformes
- Family: Furnariidae
- Genus: Xiphorhynchus
- Species: X. triangularis

Binomial name
- Xiphorhynchus triangularis (Lafresnaye, 1842)

= Olive-backed woodcreeper =

Species of bird

The olive-backed woodcreeper (Xiphorhynchus triangularis) is a species of bird in the subfamily Dendrocolaptinae of the ovenbird family Furnariidae. It is found in Bolivia, Colombia, Ecuador, Peru, and Venezuela.

== Taxonomy and systematics ==
The olive-backed woodcreeper and the spotted woodcreeper (X. erythropygius) were formerly considered conspecific but since the mid-20th century have been treated as separate species.

The olive-backed woodcreeper has these four subspecies:

- X. t. triangularis (Lafresnaye, 1842)
- X. t. hylodromus Wetmore, 1939
- X. t. intermedius Carriker, 1935
- X. t. bangsi Chapman, 1919

== Description ==
The olive-backed woodcreeper is 19.5 to 25 cm (7.7 to 9.8 in) long, males weigh 40 to 52 g (1.4 to 1.8 oz) and females 32 to 48 g (1.1 to 1.7 oz). It is a medium-sized member of genus Xiphorhynchus, with a slightly decurved bill. The sexes have the same plumage. Adults of the nominate subspecies X. t. triangularis have a finely streaked face with a buffy supercilium and eyering. Their crown and nape are blackish brown with pale buff elongated spots. Their back, wing coverts, and rump are bright olive to brownish olive. Their upper back has scattered buff streaks. Their uppertail coverts are cinnamon to rufous-chestnut. Their flight feather have cinnamon to rufous-chestnut inner webs and bright olive outer webs with dusky tips on the primaries. Their tail is dark rufous-chestnut. Their throat is buffy white with a blackish brown scaly appearance. Their underparts are a slightly lighter olive than their upperparts. Their breast has many buffy whitish spots that become more triangular on the belly. Their flanks are plain, their undertail coverts have thin streaks, and their underwing coverts are ochraceous. Their iris is dark brown, their maxilla horn-black and whitish to bluish ivory on the side, their mandible gray with paler spots on the side, and their legs and feet blue-gray to gray with a faint olive cast. Juveniles are similar to adults but duller overall and with smaller spots on the breast.

Subspecies X. t. hylodromus has brighter olive brown upperparts than the nominate; its secondaries are darker and less reddish, its throat paler with thinner scaling, and its underparts lighter, more greenish olive, and more heavily spotted. Subspecies X. t. bangsi has more rufescent (less olive) upperparts than the nominate, its crown spots are larger, its back is more distinctly streaked, its throat is more whitish with olive, not blackish, scaling, its underparts' spots are smaller and are replaced with narrow streaks on the belly, its undertail-coverts are more rufescent with finer streaks, and its bill is whitish with black only on the base and tip of the maxilla. X. t. intermedius is intermediate between the nominate and bangsi, with slightly browner upperparts and paler and browner underparts than the nominate.

== Distribution and habitat ==
Subspecies X. t. hylodromus of the olive-backed woodcreeper is the northernmost. It is found in the coastal and interior mountains of northern Venezuela. The nominate X. t. triangularis is found from the Andes of western Venezuela south in all three Andean ranges of Colombia and through eastern Ecuador into northern Peru as far as the Marañón River. X. t. intermedius is found on the eastern slope of the Ander in Peru's departments of Pasco, Junín, and Cuzco. X. t. bangsi is found on the eastern slope of the Andes from southeastern Peru into central Bolivia.

The olive-backed woodcreeper inhabits the middle elevations of the Andes. It is most common in humid evergreen montane forest and very humid cloudforest and extends into elfin forest. It favors the interior of mature primary forest but sometimes occurs at its edge and in mature secondary forest. In elevation it mostly ranges between 1,000 and 2,400 m (3,300 and 7,900 ft) but reaches as high as 2,700 m (8,900 ft) in Colombia and Peru and as low as 400 m (1,300 ft) in Colombia and Bolivia.

== Behavior ==
=== Movement ===
The olive-backed woodcreeper is believed to be a year-round resident throughout its range.

=== Feeding ===
Though the olive-backed woodcreeper's diet has not been detailed, it is believed to be mostly arthropods. It typically forages singly or in pairs and occasionally in small groups. It sometimes joins mixed-species feeding flocks. It hitches up and along trunks, vines, and large branches, usually from the forest's mid-level to the subcanopy but sometimes higher and lower. Much prey is taken from clumps of moss; some is taken from the bark surface and crevices and from epiphytes.

=== Breeding ===
The olive-backed woodcreeper's breeding seasons have not been fully defined. In northern Venezuela it nests from April to June and apparently in that span in Colombia's western and central Andes. It appears to nest later in Colombia's eastern Andes. Nothing else is known about the species' breeding biology.

=== Vocalization ===
The olive-backed woodcreeper appears to be less vocal than many others of its genus. Its song is "a series of hard notes that accelerates then slows, 'we we we-we-we-we-we-WE-WE-We-we-wa' ". It also has a fainter song, "a weak and somewhat nasal series that accelerates into a slow trill, 'quee, quee QUEE-que-que'e'e'e'e'." Its most frequently-described call is "a rather sharp and piercing, strongly downslurred 'keeeyur' at times interspersed with a run-together series of semimusical notes".

== Status ==
The IUCN has assessed the olive-backed woodcreeper as being of Least Concern. It has a fairly large range but its population size is not known and is believed to be decreasing. No immediate threats have been identified. It is considered uncommon to fairly common throughout its range. It is "[l]argely restricted to mature forest, and therefore believed to be highly sensitive to human disturbance."
