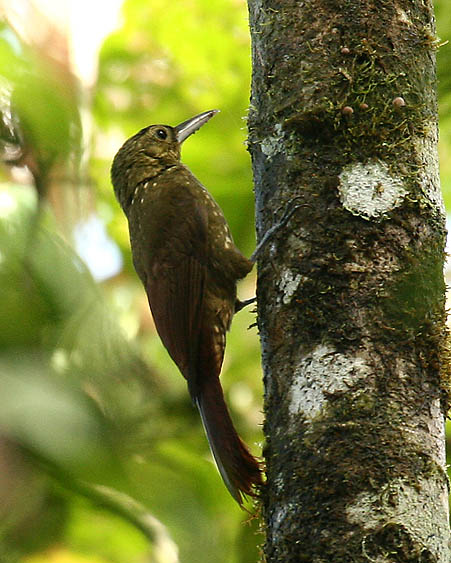

Scientific classification
- Kingdom: Animalia
- Phylum: Chordata
- Class: Aves
- Order: Passeriformes
- Family: Furnariidae
- Genus: Xiphorhynchus
- Species: X. erythropygius

Binomial name
- Xiphorhynchus erythropygius (Sclater, PL, 1860)

= Spotted woodcreeper =

Species of bird

The spotted woodcreeper (Xiphorhynchus erythropygius) is a species of bird in the subfamily Dendrocolaptinae of the ovenbird family Furnariidae. It is found in Belize, Colombia, Costa Rica, Ecuador, El Salvador, Guatemala, Honduras, Mexico, Nicaragua, and Panama.

== Taxonomy and systematics ==
The spotted woodcreeper and the olive-backed woodcreeper (X. triangularis) were formerly considered conspecific but since the mid-20th century have been treated as separate species.

The spotted woodcreeper's taxonomy is otherwise unsettled. The American Ornithological Society, the International Ornithological Committee, and the Clements taxonomy assign it these five subspecies that Clements puts into two groups:

- "Spotted" group
  - X. e. erythropygius (Sclater, PL, 1860)
  - X. e. parvus Griscom, 1937
- "Berlepsch's" group
  - X. e. punctigula (Ridgway, 1889)
  - X. e. insolitus Ridgway, 1909
  - X. e. aequatorialis (Berlepsch & Taczanowski, 1884)

However, BirdLife International's Handbook of the Birds of the World (HBW) treats the two groups as separate species, calling the "spotted" group the "northern spotted woodcreeper" (X. erythropygius) and "Berlepsch's" group the "southern spotted woodcreeper (X. aequatorialis).

This article follows the five-subspecies model.

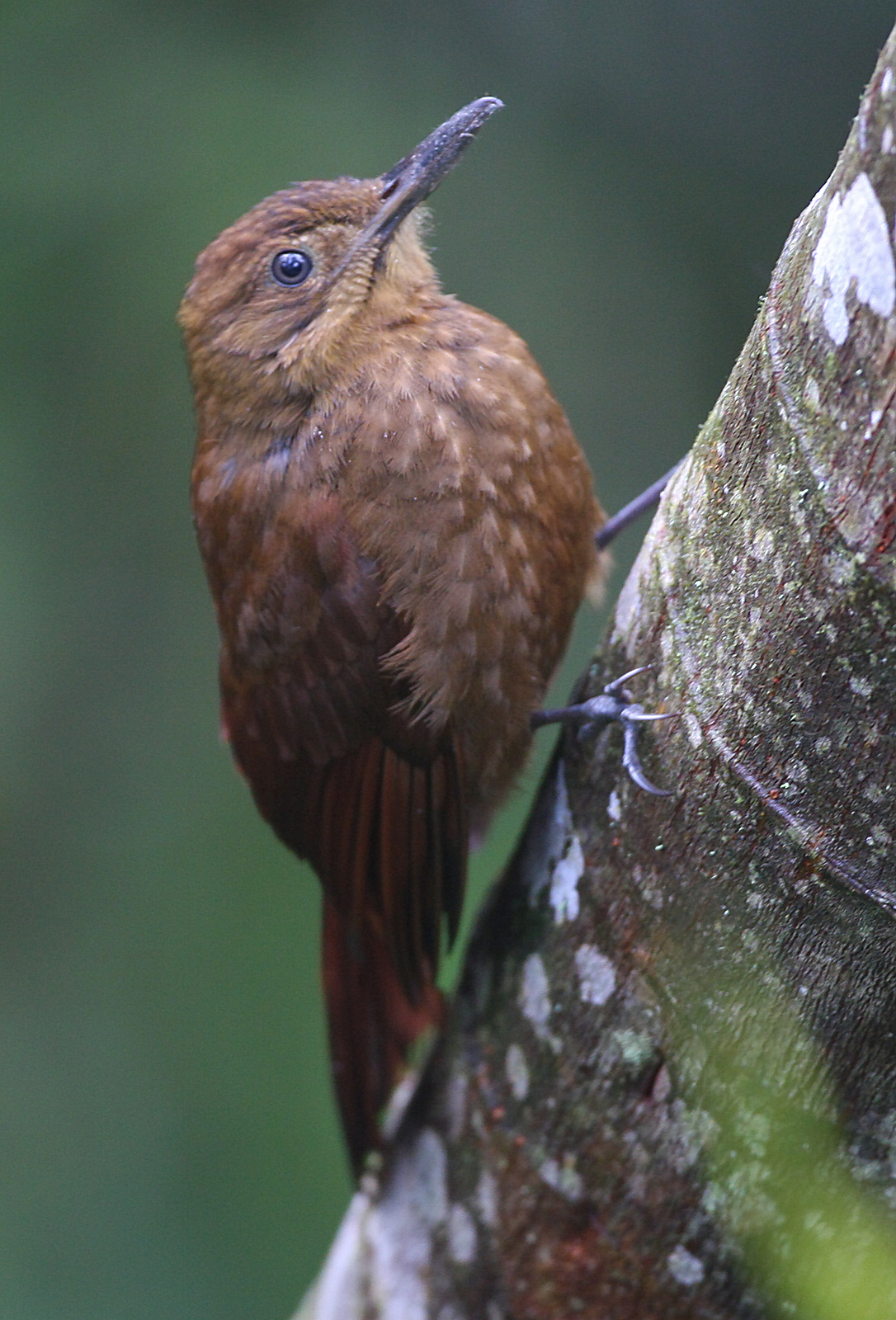
Tandayapa Valley, northwestern Ecuador

== Description ==
The spotted woodcreeper is 19 to 24 cm (7.5 to 9.4 in) long. Males weigh 40 to 54 g (1.4 to 1.9 oz) and females 40 to 46 g (1.4 to 1.6 oz). It is a medium-sized member of genus Xiphorhynchus, with a longish, slightly decurved and gradually tapering bill. The sexes have the same plumage. Adults of the nominate subspecies X. e. erythropygius have dusky lores, a buff supercilium and eyering, and dusky olive ear coverts with buff streaks. Their crown and nape are dark olive to brownish olive with small buff spots and a narrow dusky edge. Their back and wing coverts are brownish olive to tawny brown with buff spots and wide buff streaks. Their rump is dark cinnamon-rufous and their flight feathers rufous-chestnut, with olive-brown edges and dusky tips on the primaries. Their tail is rufous-chestnut. Their throat is buffy with narrow dark olive barring. Their underparts are pale greenish olive with large buff teardrops that are lighter on the flanks and undertail coverts. Their underwing coverts are deep buff. Their iris is dark brown, their maxilla blackish to dark brown with sometimes a pale stripe on its cutting edge, their mandible whitish horn to pinkish gray, and their legs and feet blue- or greenish gray to slate gray. Juveniles are similar to adults but browner overall with less distinct spots on their underparts.

The other subspecies of the spotted woodcreeper differ from the nominate and each other thus:

- X. e. parvus, smaller with more rufescent upperparts
- X. e. punctigula, smaller and more greenish overall, fine streaks on forehead while crown and nape plain, fine streaks on upper back and otherwise plain upperparts, fewer and smaller spots on underparts
- X. e. insolitus, like punctigula but with slightly darker upperparts and lighter rufous wings
- X. e. aequatorialis, smaller and more greenish overall, buffier eyering, fine streaks on forehead, crown and nape plain, sparse fine buff streaks on upperparts, rufous rump, tail, and wings, spots (not scales) on throat, larger buff spots on underparts

== Distribution and habitat ==
The subspecies of the spotted woodcreeper are found thus; the ranges are discontinuous:

- X. e. erythropygius, central and southern Mexico from San Luis Potosí and Hidalgo south to Oaxaca and Guerrero
- X. e. parvus, from southern Oaxaca and Chiapas in Mexico to and in Guatemala, northwestern El Salvador, Honduras, and north-central Nicaragua; locally in southern Belize
- X. e. punctigula, from southeastern Nicaragua through Costa Rica into central Panama
- X. e. insolitus, discontinuosly from central Panama into northwestern and north-central Colombia
- X. e. aequatorialis, the Pacific slope from western Colombia to southwestern Ecuador

The spotted woodcreeper inhabits humid forest. In lower elevations it favors tropical evergreen forest and in higher ones evergreen montane forest, cloudforest, and especially in the north, pine and pine-oak woodlands. In all landscapes if favors forest with heavy covers of moss and epiphytes. In mature forest it tends to stay in the canopy of the interior, but is regular at the forest edge, in older secondary forest, and sometimes in tree plantations and at scattered trees near continuous forest. In elevation it mostly ranges between 600 and 1,800 m (2,000 and 5,900 ft) but reaches 2,900 m (9,500 ft) in northern Central America, 2,000 m (6,600 ft) in Ecuador, and locally 2,500 m (8,200 ft) elsewhere. In Costa Rica, Colombia, and Ecuador it occasionally is found nearer sea level.

== Behavior ==
=== Movement ===
The spotted woodcreeper is a year-round resident throughout its range.

=== Feeding ===
The spotted woodcreeper's diet is mostly arthropods but also includes small vertebrates and small amounts of vegetable matter. It usually forages singly, though sometimes in pairs or more rarely in family groups. It regularly joins mixed-species feeding flocks at all levels of the forest. It hitches up trunks and along branches, usually in a spiral but also creeping along the underside of large limbs. Most prey is taken by gleaning bark and probing vine tangles, dead leaf clusters, bromeliads, and epiphytes. It sometimes flakes bark. It sometimes follows army ant swarms, staying fairly low and usually capturing prey like it does while with flocks.

=== Breeding ===
The breeding seasons of the "spotted" group of subspecies are not known. In Costa Rica and Panama the species nests between March and June and in Colombia between at least February and May. It nests in a cavity in a tree or stump. The clutch size is two eggs. The incubation period, time to fledging, and details of parental care are not known.

=== Vocalization ===
The spotted woodcreeper is rather vocal. It mostly sings at dawn and dusk and less frequently during the day. Its song is "a series 4–6·5 seconds long of 2–5 (usually 3–4) long descending whistles, each at progressively lower pitch, and sometimes followed by 1–2 additional notes at same pitch". It has been described as "piiiiiiiiiiiiir, piiiiiiiiiiir, piiiiiiiiiiiir", "d'ddrrear, d'ddrrear, d'ddrrear, whew, whew", and "d-d-d-r-rreeuw, d-d-d-r-rreeuw, d-d-d-r-rreeuw". Its calls include "a whistled 'wheeeoo' or 'hee-e-e-e-ew', a descending 'jeeu' or 'djeer'...and a low, hen-like 'cut-uck'."

== Status ==
The IUCN follows HBW taxonomy and so has separately evaluated the "northern" and "southern" spotted woodcreepers. Both are assessed as being of Least Concern. The population size of neither is known and both are believed to be decreasing. No immediate threats to either have been identified. It is considered uncommon to fairly common (though locally common) in most of its range, though scarce in drier habitats. It "[r]equires continuous to somewhat patchy forest, and [is] thus believed to be at least moderately sensitive to forest fragmentation and other forms of human disturbance."
