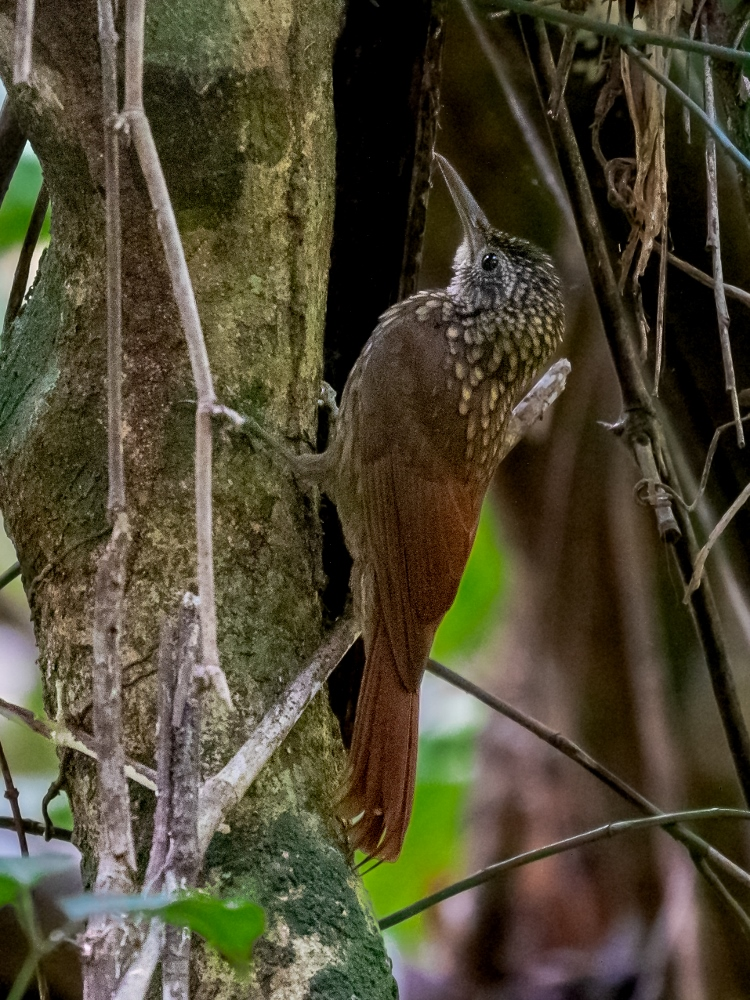

Conservation status
- Least Concern (IUCN 3.1)

Scientific classification
- Kingdom: Animalia
- Phylum: Chordata
- Class: Aves
- Order: Passeriformes
- Family: Furnariidae
- Genus: Xiphorhynchus
- Species: X. spixii

Binomial name
- Xiphorhynchus spixii (Lesson, 1830)

= Spix's woodcreeper =

Species of bird

Spix's woodcreeper (Xiphorhynchus spixii) is a species of bird in the subfamily Dendrocolaptinae of the ovenbird family Furnariidae. It is endemic to Brazil.

== Taxonomy and systematics ==
Spix's woodcreeper and the elegant woodcreeper (X. elegans) have been treated as conspecific by some authors. Even after the separation, some authors treated what are now two subspecies of the elegant woodcreeper, X. e. insignis and X. e. juruanus, as subspecies of Spix's. Spix's woodcreeper is monotypic.

The species' common name and specific epithet commemorate the German naturalist Johann Baptist von Spix (1782-1826).

== Description ==
Spix's woodcreeper is a medium-sized member of its genus, with a longish, slim, slightly decurved bill. The species is 18.5 to 21 cm (7.3 to 8.3 in) long and weighs 27 to 36 g (0.95 to 1.27 oz). The sexes have the same plumage. Adults have a dusky brown face with narrow buff streaks and a pale supercilium and eyering. Their crown and nape are blackish brown with small buff teardrop spots that are streakier and blackish-edged on the nape. Their back and wing coverts are olive-brown, with buff teardrop spots with blackish edges on the back. Their wing coverts have buffy stripes or spots. Their flight feathers, rump, and tail are dark cinnamon to rufous-chestnut with dusky brownish tips on the primaries. Their throat is pale buff with a dusky lower edge. Their breast, sides, and belly are dull olive-brown, with longish dusky-edged buff streaks. Their flanks and undertail coverts are mostly plain. Their iris is dark brown, their bill dark brown with a paler tip, and their legs and feet bluish to gray. Juveniles are similar to adults but their underparts' streaks are not well defined.

== Distribution and habitat ==
Spix's woodcreeper is found in the lower Amazon Basin of northeastern Brazil. It occurs south of the Amazon from the Rio Tapajós east to the northern Rio Maranhão and western Rio Tocantins. It mostly inhabits humid evergreen forest, primarily terra firme but also várzea. It favors the interior of primary forest but sometimes occurs in secondary forest and even less frequently at forest edges. In elevation it ranges from sea level to 500 m (1,600 ft).

== Behavior ==
=== Movement ===
Spix's woodcreeper is assumed to be a year-round resident throughout its range.

=== Feeding ===
The diet of Spix's woodcreeper's is mostly arthropods. Single birds and sometimes pairs regularly join mixed-species foraging flocks; they less often forage alone or by following army ant swarms. It hitches up and along trunks and branches and captures prey mostly by pecking into bark crevices, clusters of dead leaves, epiphytes, and dead wood. When following ants it sometimes catches prey by sallies from a perch.

=== Breeding ===
Little is known about the breeding biology of Spix's woodcreeper. Its breeding season appears to include at least November to March. The few known nests were in tree cavities and were lined with wood chips. The clutches were of two eggs.

=== Vocalization ===
The song of Spix's woodcreeper is a "very high, very fast trill, descending at beginning, level at end, last note higher". It has been put into words as "twe-tee-ti-ti-ti-…-ti-ti-it, wheu". Its calls are described as similar to those of the elegant woodcreeper, "sharp 'chip' notes followed by a whine", also described as "3-noted 'tjictjicwuuuw' ".

== Status ==
The IUCN has assessed Spix's woodcreeper as being of Least Concern. It has a fairly large range but its population size is not known and is believed to be decreasing. No immediate threats have been identified. It is considered uncommon to fairly common, but is "[b]elieved to be highly sensitive to loss and fragmentation of forest."
