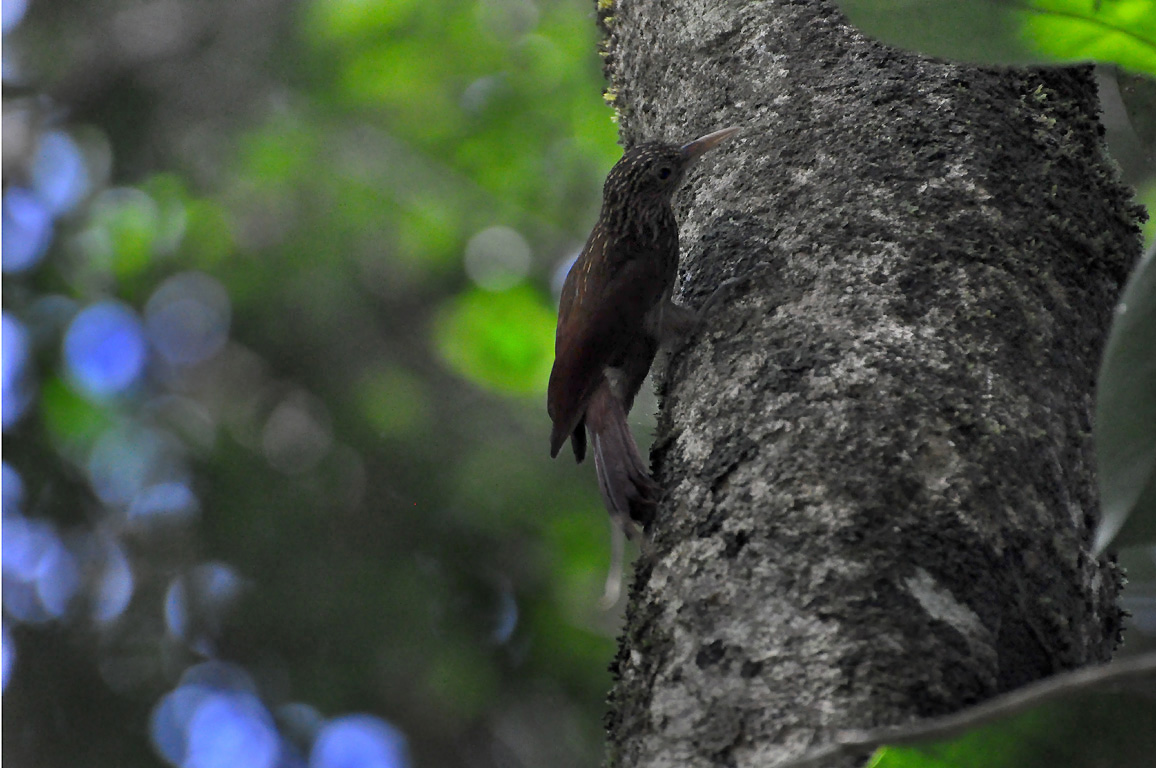

Conservation status
- Least Concern (IUCN 3.1)

Scientific classification
- Kingdom: Animalia
- Phylum: Chordata
- Class: Aves
- Order: Passeriformes
- Family: Furnariidae
- Genus: Xiphorhynchus
- Species: X. elegans

Binomial name
- Xiphorhynchus elegans (Pelzeln, 1868)

= Elegant woodcreeper =

Species of bird

The elegant woodcreeper (Xiphorhynchus elegans) is a species of bird in the subfamily Dendrocolaptinae of the ovenbird family Furnariidae. It is found in Bolivia, Brazil, Colombia, Ecuador, and Peru.

== Taxonomy and systematics ==
The elegant woodcreeper has these five subspecies:

- X. e. buenavistae Zimmer, JT, 1948
- X. e. ornatus Zimmer, JT, 1934
- X. e. insignis (Hellmayr, 1905)
- X. e. juruanus (Ihering, HFA, 1905)
- X. e. elegans (Pelzeln, 1868)

Some authors have treated the elegant woodcreeper and Spix's woodcreeper (X. spixii) as conspecific. Subspecies X. e. insignis and X. e. juruanus have been treated as separate species and also as subspecies of Spix's woodcreeper.

== Description ==
The elegant woodcreeper is a medium-sized member of its genus, with a longish, slim, nearly straight bill. The species is 18 to 22.5 cm (7.1 to 8.9 in) long; males weigh 31 to 38 g (1.1 to 1.3 oz) and females 29 to 35 g (1.0 to 1.2 oz). The sexes have the same plumage. Adults of the nominate subspecies X. e. elegans have a blackish brown face with bold buff streaks, whitish lores, and a pale supercilium. Their crown and nape are dark olive-brown with small buff spots with blackish edges that are streakier on the nape. Their back is paler brown than their face, with buff teardrop-shaped spots with blackish edges. Their wings, rump, and tail are cinnamon-rufous to rufous-chestnut with darker tips on the primaries. Their wing coverts have buffy stripes or spots. Their throat is buffy whitish with a scaly appearance at its lower edge. Their breast, sides, and upper belly are grayish olive-brown; the breast and sides have buffy teardrops or chevrons with blackish edges. Their lower belly and undertail coverts are more ochraceous with weak or no streaks. Their iris is light chestnut to dark brown, their maxilla dark brown to black, their mandible gray to bluish gray with a brownish tip, and their legs and feet dark gray, greenish gray, or bluish olive-gray. Juveniles are similar to adults but are darker with fine streaks on their upper back.

Subspecies X. e. ornatus of the elegant woodcreeper is similar to the nominate, but overall warmer in color, with larger spots on its upper- and underparts, and deeper rufous wings, rump, and tail. X. e. buenavistae is also similar to the nominate, but somewhat grayer than ornatus. Its bill is paler and its upper back is less rufous with less obvious streaking on the wing coverts. X. e. insignis has plain (unstreaked) wing coverts and its upperparts' streaking is mostly confined to the upper back and is narrower and longer than the nominate's. X. e. juruanus is slightly larger than the other subspecies. It also has plain wing coverts, and its underparts' spots are smaller than the nominate's and mostly on the upper breast.

== Distribution and habitat ==
The subspecies of the elegant woodcreeper are found thus:

- X. e. buenavistae, the upper watershed of the Rio Orinoco on the eastern slope of the Eastern Andes in south-central Colombia
- X. e. ornatus, the northwestern Amazon Basin north of the Amazon from southeastern Colombia, eastern Ecuador, and northeastern Peru east into northwestern Brazil at least as far as the Rio Içá
- X. e. insignis, east-central Peru south of the Rio Marañón and west of the Rio Ucayali
- X. e. juruanus, the southwestern Amazon Basin of eastern and southeastern Peru, western Brazil east to the Rio Madeira and south to Acre and northwestern Bolivia
- X. e. elegans, the southern Amazon Basin in Brazil south of the Amazon between the Rio Madeira and Rio Tapajós south to Mato Grosso and extreme eastern Bolivia

The elegant woodcreeper primarily inhabits humid evergreen forest. It favors terra firme and floodplains. It occasionally occurs in seasonally flooded várzea and igapó forest and on river islands. At the southern reaches of its range it extends into the cerrado in gallery forest. It favors the forest interior but does occur at its edges and in secondary forest. In most of its range it is found below 600 m (2,000 ft) but locally reaches 1,500 m (4,900 ft) on the eastern Andean slopes.

== Behavior ==
=== Movement ===
The elegant woodcreeper is a year-round resident throughout its range.

=== Feeding ===
The elegant woodcreeper's diet is mostly arthropods but also occasionally includes small vertebrates. Single birds or pairs are often a core species in mixed-species foraging flocks; it favors those led by Thamnomanes antshrikes. It mostly feeds from the understory to about 10 m (33 ft) above the ground, but will go up to about 20 m (66 ft). It hitches up and along trunks and branches and captures prey by gleaning and by pecking bark crevices, clusters of dead leaves, epiphytes, and dead wood. It infrequently follows army ant swarms, where it forages near the ground mostly by pecking prey from trunks but also by sallies from a perch.

=== Breeding ===
The elegant woodcreeper's breeding season has not been fully defined but appears to include August to October. It nests in cavities in trees. Only one nest has been fully described. Its clutch was two eggs, its incubation period at least 16 days, and the time to fledging 18 to 19 days.

=== Vocalization ===
The elegant woodcreeper sings mostly at dawn and dusk. One song is "a descending series of c. 30 ringing whistles that begins softly and slows at end, 'whit, whit, wit, wit, wit...wit, wit, wee, wee, wee, wit, wit, wit, wit, wew'." Another is ""tchip-tchip-tchip-tchip-thcup-tchup, tucweu, tchweu." Its calls include "sharp 'chip' notes followed by a whine", also described as "3-noted 'tjictjicwuuuw' ".

== Status ==
The IUCN has assessed the elegant woodcreeper as being of Least Concern. It has a very large range but its population size is not known and is believed to be decreasing. No immediate threats have been identified. It is considered fairly common to common in most of its range but rare to uncommon and local in Ecuador. It is "[d]ependent on forest, and thus believed to be highly sensitive to loss and fragmentation of this habitat."
