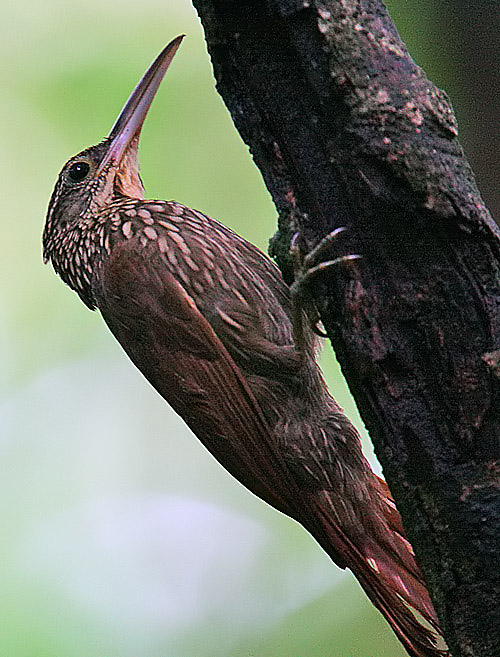
- Ivory-billed woodcreeper (Xiphorhynchus flavigaster)

Scientific classification
- Kingdom: Animalia
- Phylum: Chordata
- Class: Aves
- Order: Passeriformes
- Family: Furnariidae
- Subfamily: Dendrocolaptinae
- Genus: Xiphorhynchus; Swainson, 1827

Type species
- Xiphorhynchus flavigaster Swainson, 1827

Species
- see text

Synonyms
- Talapius Rafinesque, 1815; Picolaptes René-Primevère Lesson, 1832; Dendrornis Eyton, 1852; Thripobrotus Cabanis, 1847; Xiphorynchus; Xyphorhynchus; Ziphorhynchus; Ziphorynchus

= Xiphorhynchus =

Genus of birds

Xiphorhynchus is a genus of birds in the woodcreeper subfamily (Dendrocolaptinae) that are found in Middle and South America.

== Taxonomy ==
The genus Xiphorhynchus was introduced in 1827 by the English naturalist William Swainson. The name combines the Ancient Greek ξίφος (xíphos), meaning "sword", and ῥύγχος (rhúnkhos), meaning "snout, bill". Swainson did not specify the type species but this was subsequently designated as the ivory-billed woodcreeper.

The genus contains the following 13 species:

Image	Scientific name	Common name	Distribution
	Striped woodcreeper	Xiphorhynchus obsoletus	Bolivia, Brazil, Colombia, Ecuador, French Guiana, Guyana, Peru, Suriname, and Venezuela.
	Lesser woodcreeper	Xiphorhynchus fuscus	eastern Brazil.
	Ceara woodcreeper	Xiphorhynchus atlanticus	northeastern Brazil.
	Chestnut-rumped woodcreeper	Xiphorhynchus pardalotus	Brazil, French Guiana, Guyana, Suriname, and Venezuela.
	Ocellated woodcreeper	Xiphorhynchus ocellatus	Southern Amazonia.
	Elegant woodcreeper	Xiphorhynchus elegans	western and southern Amazon in Bolivia, Brazil, Colombia, Ecuador, and Peru.
	Spix's woodcreeper	Xiphorhynchus spixii	eastern Amazon of Brazil.
	Buff-throated woodcreeper	Xiphorhynchus guttatus	tropical South America in the Guiana
	Cocoa woodcreeper	Xiphorhynchus susurrans	tropical Central and South America in Trinidad, Tobago, northern Colombia and northern Venezuela.
	Ivory-billed woodcreeper	Xiphorhynchus flavigaster	Belize, Costa Rica, El Salvador, Guatemala, Honduras, Mexico, and Nicaragua.
	Black-striped woodcreeper	Xiphorhynchus lachrymosus	Colombia, Costa Rica, Ecuador, Nicaragua, and Panama.
	Spotted woodcreeper	Xiphorhynchus erythropygius	Belize, Colombia, Costa Rica, Ecuador, El Salvador, Guatemala, Honduras, Mexico, Nicaragua, and Panama.
	Olive-backed woodcreeper	Xiphorhynchus triangularis	Bolivia, Colombia, Ecuador, Peru, and Venezuela.

The straight-billed woodcreeper and Zimmer's woodcreeper are now separated in Dendroplex.
