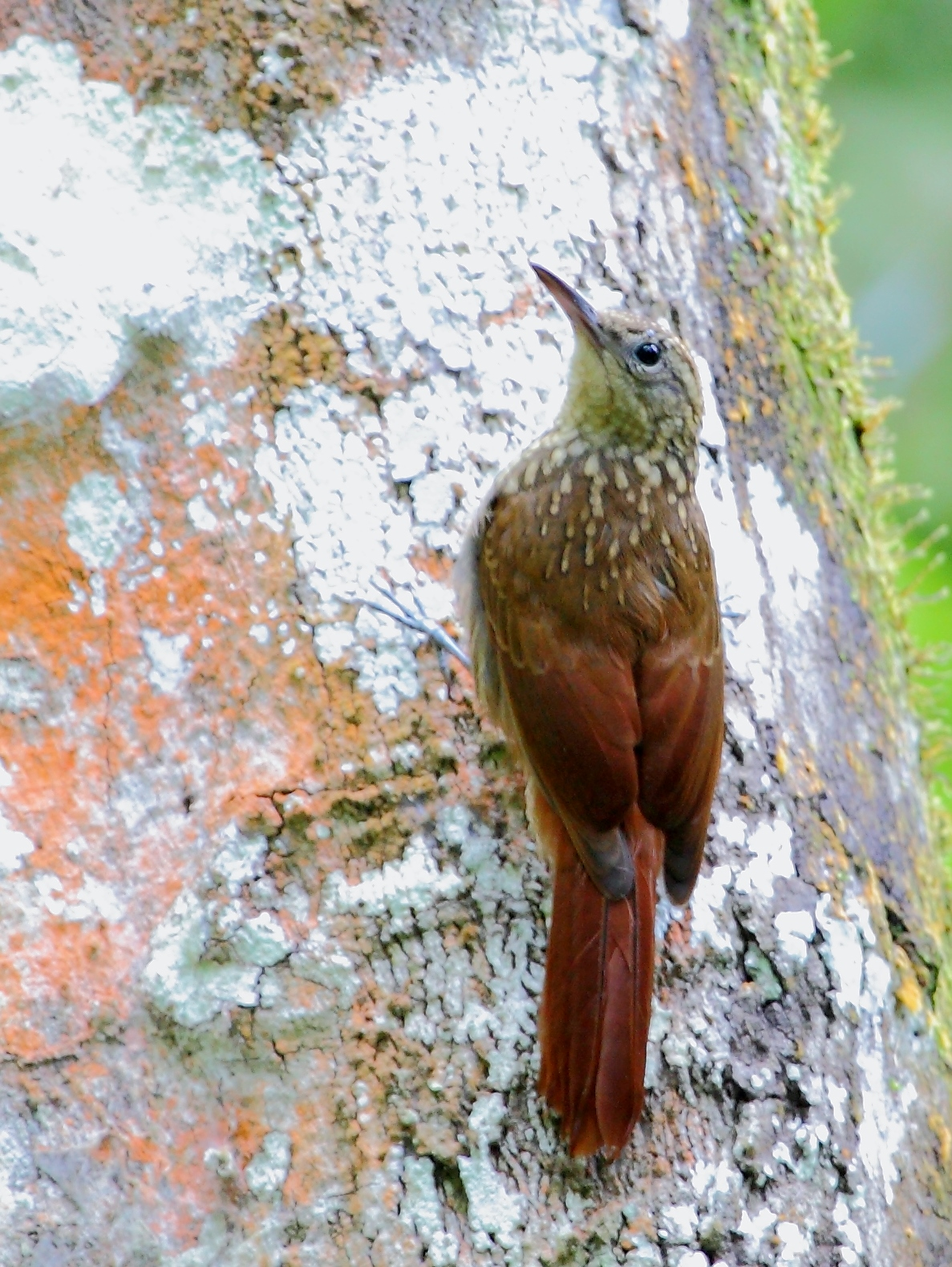

Conservation status
- Vulnerable (IUCN 3.1)

Scientific classification
- Kingdom: Animalia
- Phylum: Chordata
- Class: Aves
- Order: Passeriformes
- Family: Furnariidae
- Genus: Xiphorhynchus
- Species: X. atlanticus

Binomial name
- Xiphorhynchus atlanticus (Cory, 1916)

= Ceara woodcreeper =

Species of bird

The Ceara woodcreeper or Atlantic woodcreeper (Xiphorhynchus atlanticus) is a Vulnerable species of bird in the subfamily Dendrocolaptinae of the ovenbird family Furnariidae. It is endemic to Brazil.

== Taxonomy and systematics ==
The Ceara woodcreeper was originally placed in genus Lepidocolaptes but has been in its current assignment since the late 1990s. Until the 2010s it was considered a subspecies of the lesser woodcreeper (X. fuscus).

The Ceara woodcreeper is monotypic.

== Description ==
The Ceara woodcreeper is a small, slim member of its genus, with a disproportionatly large head and a longish, slim, slightly decurved bill. The species is 15 to 18.5 cm (5.9 to 7.3 in) long. The sexes have the same plumage. Adults have a mostly dusky face with a thin creamy to yellowish buff supercilium and often a pale eye ring. Their crown and nape are blackish brown with small yellowish buff to cinnamon spots on the crown. The spots become streaks on the nape and sides of the neck and weakly continue onto the upper back. Their back and wing coverts are olive-brown to reddish brown. Their flight feathers, rump, and tail are rufous-chestnut with darker outer webs and tips on the flight feathers. Their throat is creamy yellow with a faint darker pattern. Their breast and belly are ochracous brown with a subdued scaly appearance from blurry dark-edged buff spots. Their undertail and underwing coverts are cinnamon. Their iris is dark brown, their maxilla blackish brown to dark horn (often with a darker base), their mandible pinkish to white (sometimes with a darker tip), and their legs and feet olive-gray to bluish gray.

== Distribution and habitat ==
The Ceara woodcreeper is found only in northeastern Brazil, from Ceara south into Alagoas north of the Rio São Francisco. It inhabits humid forest, both primary and secondary and also relict patches of brejos de altitude in the Caatinga. In elevation it reaches 600 m (2,000 ft).

== Behavior ==
=== Movement ===
The Ceara woodcreeper is believed to be a year-round resident throughout its range.

=== Feeding ===
The Ceara woodcreeper's diet and foraging behavior have not been detailed but they are assumed to be similar to those of its former "parent", the lesser woodcreeper (which see here: Lesser woodcreeper#Feeding).

=== Breeding ===
Nothing is known about the Ceara woodcreeper's breeding biology.

=== Vocalization ===
The Ceara woodcreeper's song is similar to that of the lesser woodcreeper (which see here: Lesser woodcreeper#Vocalization), but it has fewer and sharper introductory notes and an ascending trill. Their calls are thought to be alike: a "very high, sharp 'fieet fieet' " and "doubled 'peep, peesp' and single 'speel' or 'wik' ".

== Status ==
The IUCN originally assessed the Ceara woodcreeper as being of Least Concern but in 2021 reclassified it as Vulnerable. It has a limited range and its estimated population of 5000 to 11,000 mature individuals is believed to be decreasing. "The principal threats are forest loss and degradation due to urbanisation, conversion to agriculture and selective logging." "Fairly common to common, but very few data on overall abundance, and its ability to adapt to fragmented or otherwise degraded areas is imperfectly known."
