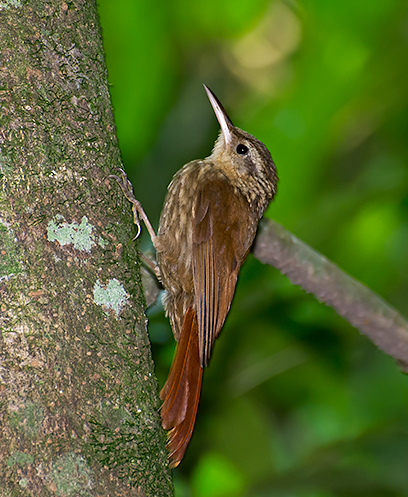

Conservation status
- Least Concern (IUCN 3.1)

Scientific classification
- Kingdom: Animalia
- Phylum: Chordata
- Class: Aves
- Order: Passeriformes
- Family: Furnariidae
- Genus: Xiphorhynchus
- Species: X. fuscus

Binomial name
- Xiphorhynchus fuscus (Vieillot, 1818)

Synonyms
- Lepidocolaptes fuscus (Vieillot, 1818)

= Lesser woodcreeper =

Species of bird

The lesser woodcreeper (Xiphorhynchus fuscus) is a species of bird in the subfamily Dendrocolaptinae of the ovenbird family Furnariidae. It is found in Argentina, Brazil, and Paraguay.

== Taxonomy and systematics ==
The lesser woodcreeper was originally placed in genus Lepidocolaptes but has been in its current assignment since the late 1990s. It has three subspecies, the nominate X. f. fuscus (Vieillot, 1818), X. f. pintoi (Longmore & Silveira, 2005), and X. f. tenuirostris (Lichtenstein, MHC, 1820). Subspecies X. f. pintoi had previously been known as Lepidocolaptes fuscus brevirostris but the subspecies epithet was changed upon the move to genus Xiphorynchus because of the principle of priority.

What is now the Ceara woodcreeper (X. atlanticus, also called Atlantic woodcreeper) was until the 2010s also considered a subspecies of the lesser woodcreeper.

== Description ==
The striped woodcreeper is a small, slim member of its genus, with a longish, slim, slightly decurved bill. The species is 15 to 18.5 cm (5.9 to 7.3 in) long and weighs 15.5 to 25 g (0.55 to 0.88 oz). The sexes have the same plumage. Adults of the nominate subspecies have a mostly dusky face with a wide creamy to yellowish buff supercilium and often a pale eyering. Their crown and nape are blackish brown with small yellowish buff to cinnamon spots on the crown. The spots become streaks on the nape and sides of the neck and weakly continue onto the upper back. Their back and wing coverts are olive-brown to reddish brown. Their flight feathers, rump, and tail are rufous-chestnut with darker outer webs and tips on the flight feathers. Their throat is plain creamy yellow. Their breast and belly are smoky brown with a bold scaly appearance from dark-edged buff spots. Their undertail and underwing coverts are cinnamon. Their iris is dark brown, their maxilla blackish brown to dark horn (often with a darker base), their mandible pinkish to white (sometimes with a darker tip), and their legs and feet olive-gray to bluish gray. Juveniles have weaker spotting on their underparts but are otherwise like adults.

Subspecies X. f. tenuirostris is larger than the nominate and its underparts' spots are paler with brower edges. X. f. pintoi is paler overall than the nominate, and is more yellowish below with more cinnamon on the wings and tail.

== Distribution and habitat ==
The nominate subspecies of the lesser woodcreeper is the most widespread. It is found from Goiás, Minas Gerais, and Espírito Santo in southeastern Brazil south into southern and southeastern Paraguay and Argentina's Misiones Province. X. f. tenuirostris is found in coastal eastern Brazil from central Bahia south into Espírito Santo. X. f. pintoi is found in western Bahia.

The lesser woodcreeper inhabits a variety of forested landscapes. In much of its range it occurs in lowland rainforest and humid montane forest. Inland it occurs in dryer semi-deciduous and gallery forests, and in the south occurs in forest dominated by Araucaria. It favors the interior and edges of primary forest and mature secondary forest and occasionally is found in younger growth and more open landscapes adjacent to forest. It mostly occurs below 1,200 m (3,900 ft) of elevation but ranges as high as 1,500 m (4,900 ft) and possibly higher.

== Behavior ==
=== Movement ===
The lesser woodcreeper is believed to be a year-round resident throughout its range. However, fluctuations in occurrence in southern Brazil might indicate some local movements.

=== Feeding ===
The lesser woodcreeper's diet is predominately, and possibly exclusively, arthropods. It forages alone and as part of mixed-species feeding flocks about equally, and less frequently follows army ant swarms. It forages mostly on tree trunks but also on branches, usually from the understory to the forest's mid-level but sometimes all the way to the canopy. It favors trees with rough bark, often with moss rather than lichen cover, and does much of its foraging in dead leaf clusters and dead bromeliads. It mostly takes prey by gleaning and pecking while on a tree but occasionally sallies from a perch.

=== Breeding ===
The lesser woodcreeper's breeding season is thought to be September to December. It nests in tree cavities; the one well-described nest was through a natural slit and was lined with dried leaves and bark chips. The clutch is usually two eggs and sometimes three. The incubation period, time to fledging, and details of parental care are not known, though evidence suggests that only the female incubates.

=== Vocalization ===
The lesser woodcreeper's song is a "fast, sharp rattle, stuttered at end"; the nominate subspecies' song also stutters at the beginning. It has been put into words as "chit, chit, chit, chee-ee-ee-ee-ee-ee-ee, chit, chit-chit." Its calls include a "very high, sharp 'fieet fieet' " and "doubled 'peep, peesp' and single 'speel' or 'wik' ".

== Status ==
The IUCN has assessed the lesser woodcreeper as being of Least Concern. It has a large range but its population size is not known and is believed to be decreasing. No immediate threats have been identified. It is considered fairly common to common in most of its Brazilian range but less so in Rio Grande do Sul, Paraguay, and Argentina. It "[h]as been suggested to be highly sensitive to human disturbance, but able to survive in moderate numbers in selectively logged forest, tall second growth, and fragments of moderate size".
