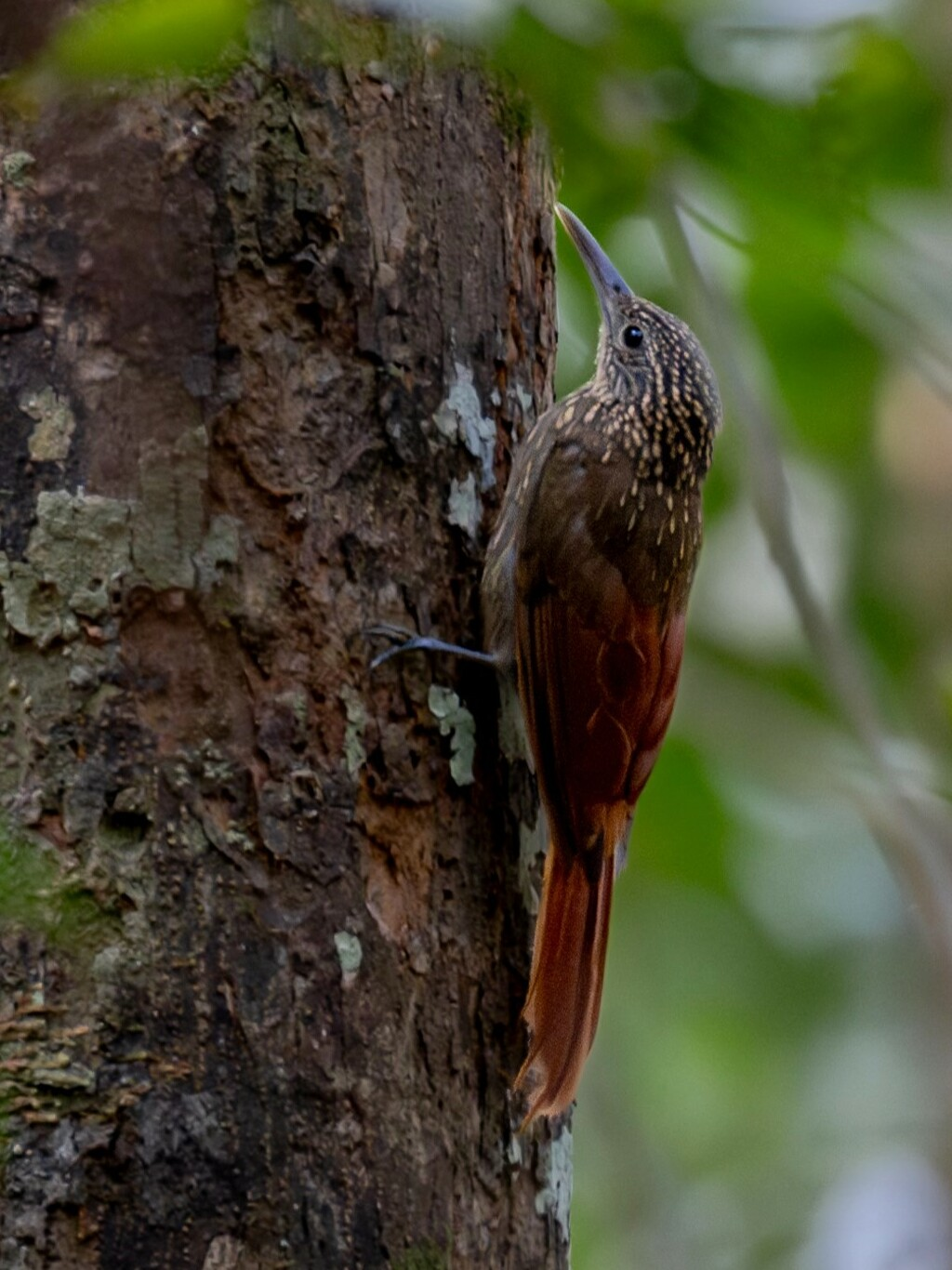
- at Presidente Figueiredo, Amazonas state, Brazil

Conservation status
- Least Concern (IUCN 3.1)

Scientific classification
- Kingdom: Animalia
- Phylum: Chordata
- Class: Aves
- Order: Passeriformes
- Family: Furnariidae
- Genus: Xiphorhynchus
- Species: X. pardalotus

Binomial name
- Xiphorhynchus pardalotus (Vieillot, 1818)

= Chestnut-rumped woodcreeper =

Species of bird

The chestnut-rumped woodcreeper (Xiphorhynchus pardalotus) is a species of bird in the subfamily Dendrocolaptinae of the ovenbird family Furnariidae. It is found in Brazil, French Guiana, Guyana, Suriname, and Venezuela.

== Taxonomy and systematics ==
The chestnut-rumped woodcreeper has two subspecies, the nominate X. p. pardalotus (Vieillot, 1818) and X. p. caurensis (Todd, 1948).

== Description ==
The chestnut-rumped woodcreeper is a medium-sized member of its genus, with a longish, slim, slightly decurved bill. The species is 20 to 23.5 cm (7.9 to 9.3 in) long; males weigh 32 to 49 g (1.1 to 1.7 oz) and females 27 to 46 g (0.95 to 1.6 oz). The sexes have the same plumage. Adults of the nominate subspecies have a face that is mostly thin deep buff and brown streaks, with a buff supercilium and eyering. Their crown and nape are blackish brown with deep buff spots on the crown, and the spots become streaks on the nape. Their back and wing coverts are reddish brown to olive-brown with some pale, blackish edged, streaks. Their wings, rump, and tail are rufous-chestnut with darker tips on the primaries. Their throat is fulvous or cinnamon-buff with a dusky edges to the feathers. Their breast, sides, and upper belly are olive-brown with blackish-edged cinnamon-buff streaks. Their lower belly and undertail coverts are more rufescent and have browish mottling. Their iris is dark brown, their maxilla dark brown to black, their mandible pale gray to pale brownish, and their legs and feet bluish gray or gray. Juveniles have a shorter bill than adults and the dark borders of their streaking are weaker. Subspecies X. p. caurensis has more rufescent upperparts than the nominate, with weaker streaking throughout.

== Distribution and habitat ==
The nominate subspecies of the chestnut-rumped woodcreeper is found in the Guianas and northern Brazil north of the Amazon River between the Rio Negro and the Atlantic Ocean in Amapá state. Subspecies X. p. caurensis is found further west, in the tepui region where Venezuela, Guyana, and Brazil meet. There is speculation that its range extends further west into extreme eastern Colombia but no documentation supports the idea.

The chestnut-rumped woodcreeper primarily inhabits lowland evergreen forest and also occurs in lower elevations of montane forest in the tepui region. It favors the interior of mature terra firme forest and also regularly occurs at its edges and in mature secondary forest. It less often occurs in floodplain forest and wooded savanna. In elevation it mostly ranges up to 500 m (1,600 ft) but reaches 1,800 m (5,900 ft) on the tepuis.

== Behavior ==
=== Movement ===
The chestnut-rumped woodcreeper is a year-round resident throughout its range.

=== Feeding ===
The chestnut-rumped woodcreeper feeds mostly on arthropods. Single birds or pairs are often a core species in mixed-species foraging flocks; it favors those led by Thamnomanes antshrikes. In a flock or by itself it feeds from the understory to the canopy, hitching up and along trunks and branches. It captures prey by gleaning and by probing bark crevices, clusters of dead leaves, epiphytes, and dead wood. It sometimes follows army ant swarms, capturing prey disturbed by them by gleaning, pecking, and sometimes sallies from a perch; it tends to remain within about 5 m (16 ft) of the ground when following ants.

=== Breeding ===
The chesnut-rumped woodcreeper breeds mostly in the dry season of September to January. It nests in a natural cavity in a tree or stump that it adds bark chips to. All known clutches were of one egg. The incubation period and time to fledging are not known. Both parents provision nestlings.

=== Vocalization ===
The chestnut-rumped woodcreeper sings mostly at dawn and dusk. Its song has been put into words as "chip!, chip, chip, chi-i-i-i-i-i-i-ip" and "zut, zut, zut-zut-zut-t't't't't,e'e e". Its calls are an "unstructured series of chirps", such as "ik" and "chip".

== Status ==
The IUCN has assessed the chestnut-rumped woodcreeper as being of Least Concern. It has a large range, and though its population size is not known it is believed to be stable. No immediate threats have been identified. It is considered fairly common to common in the lowlands. "As [with] most flocking and ant-following species, [it is] generally considered highly sensitive to loss and fragmentation of forest."
