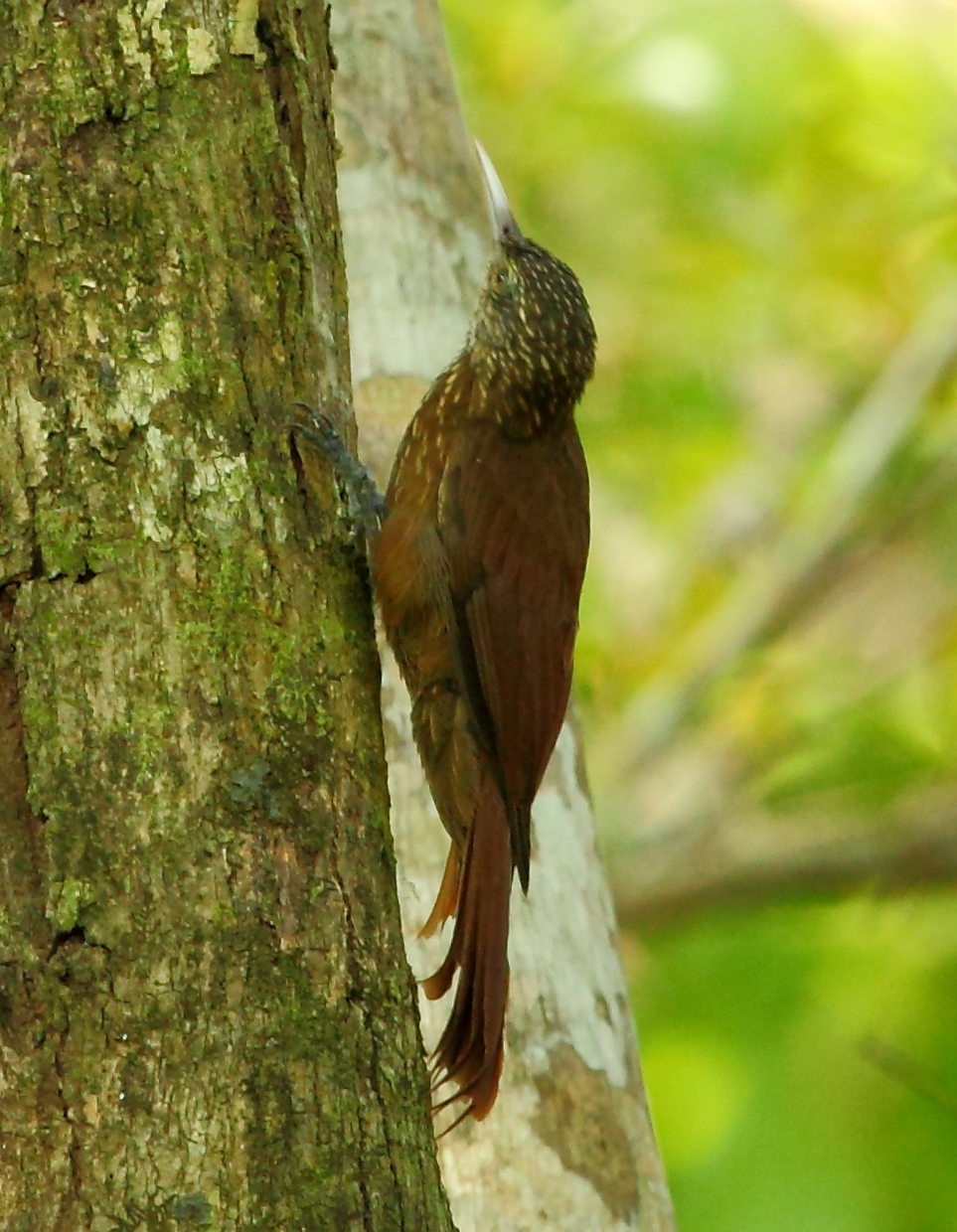
- at Iranduba, Amazonas state, Brazil

Conservation status
- Least Concern (IUCN 3.1)

Scientific classification
- Kingdom: Animalia
- Phylum: Chordata
- Class: Aves
- Order: Passeriformes
- Family: Furnariidae
- Genus: Dendroplex
- Species: D. kienerii

Binomial name
- Dendroplex kienerii (Des Murs, 1856)

Synonyms
- Xiphorhynchus kienerii Xiphorhynchus necopinus (Zimmer, 1934)

= Zimmer's woodcreeper =

Species of bird

Zimmer's woodcreeper (Dendroplex kienerii) is a species of bird in the subfamily Dendrocolaptinae of the ovenbird family Furnariidae. It is found in Brazil, Colombia, and Peru.

== Taxonomy and systematics ==
Zimmer's woodcreeper was originally described as Dendrornis kienerii. In 1934 Zimmer described what he believed was a new species, naming it Xiphorhynchus necopinus. By 2002 it was realized that the species was actually the earlier-described D. kienerii, so by the principle of priority, the specific epithet reverted to kienerii. In the 1950s genus Dendroplex had been merged into genus Xyphorhynchus but in the early 2000s it was resurrected for this species and the straight-billed woodcreeper (D. picus).

Zimmer's woodcreeper is monotypic.

== Description ==
Zimmer's woodcreeper is 21 to 24 cm (8.3 to 9.4 in) long and weighs 40 to 50 g (1.4 to 1.8 oz). It is a slim, medium-sized woodcreeper with a short bill whose culmen curves gently down to a sharp tip. The sexes have the same plumage. Adults have whitish lores and supercilium on a blackish and white streaked face. Their crown is grayish brown with light buffy spots and blackish tips on the feathers. Their nape is lighter and browner with fuzzy streaks. Their back and wing coverts are dark brown to reddish brown with narrow streaks only on the upper back. Their rump is light rufous-chestnut. Their flight feathers and tail are darker rufous-chestnut, and their flight feathers have dusky blackish tips. Their throat is whitish with a trace of buffy and thin dusky streaking on the sides. Their breast is cinnamon-brown with buff triangular streaks that have blackish edges; the streaks disappear by the more rufescent belly. Their undertail coverts are rufescent with wide buffy streaks, and their underwing coverts are light ochraceous-buff. Their iris is light brown to dark brownish gray and is surrounded by a mustard-yellow eyering. Their bill is grayish horn to whitish with a dusky base to the maxilla. Their legs and feet are bluish gray to dull brownish slate. Juveniles are similar to adults but duller overall, with less distinct spots and streaks and a blackish bill.

== Distribution and habitat ==
Zimmer's woodcreeper is found along the Amazon River from extreme southeastern Colombia and northeastern Peru into Brazil to near the mouth of the Rio Tapajós, and also along major Amazon tributaries to the north and as far south as Rondônia. It almost exclusively inhabits seasonally flooded várzea and igapó forest along the rivers; it also inhabits river islands. It favors the interior of the forest but also occurs at its edges and in mature secondary forest. In elevation it generally reaches only about as high as 200 m (700 ft) but occurs up to 400 m (1,300 ft) in Colombia.

== Behavior ==
=== Movement ===
Zimmer's woodcreeper is believed to be a year-round resident throughout its range.

=== Feeding ===
Details of the diet of Zimmer's woodcreeper are not known; it is assumed to be mostly arthropods. It usually forages singly and often joins mixed-species feeding flocks on islands. It creeps up trunks and branches between the forest's mid-level and subcanopy and sometimes into the canopy. It probably captures most of its prey by gleaning from bark surfaces or crevices; it has been observed pecking rotting wood and the tunnels of arboreal termites.

=== Breeding ===
The breeding season of Zimmer's woodcreeper includes April but essentially nothing else is known about its breeding biology.

=== Vocalization ===
Zimmer's woodcreeper sings on and off throughout the day. Its song is "a rapid series of high-frequency notes described as 'tr'r'r'r'r'r'r'r'r'r'r' " and also as a "very high, fast, almost level series of 'i' notes".

== Status ==
The IUCN originally assessed Zimmer's woodcreeper as being of Least Concern but since 2012, but rated it as Near Threatened from 2012 – 2024. It is once again considered Least Concern. It has a large range, occurring across most of the river valleys of the Amazon Basin, but its unknown population size is believed to be decreasing. It is primarily threatened by habitat loss due to deforestation. It is considered fairly common to common in the central part of its range and less common at the upriver reaches where the flooded areas are narrower. "Because island forest is necessarily successional, this species is probably less susceptible to human disturbance than are many woodcreepers, provided that relatively tall forest is available."
