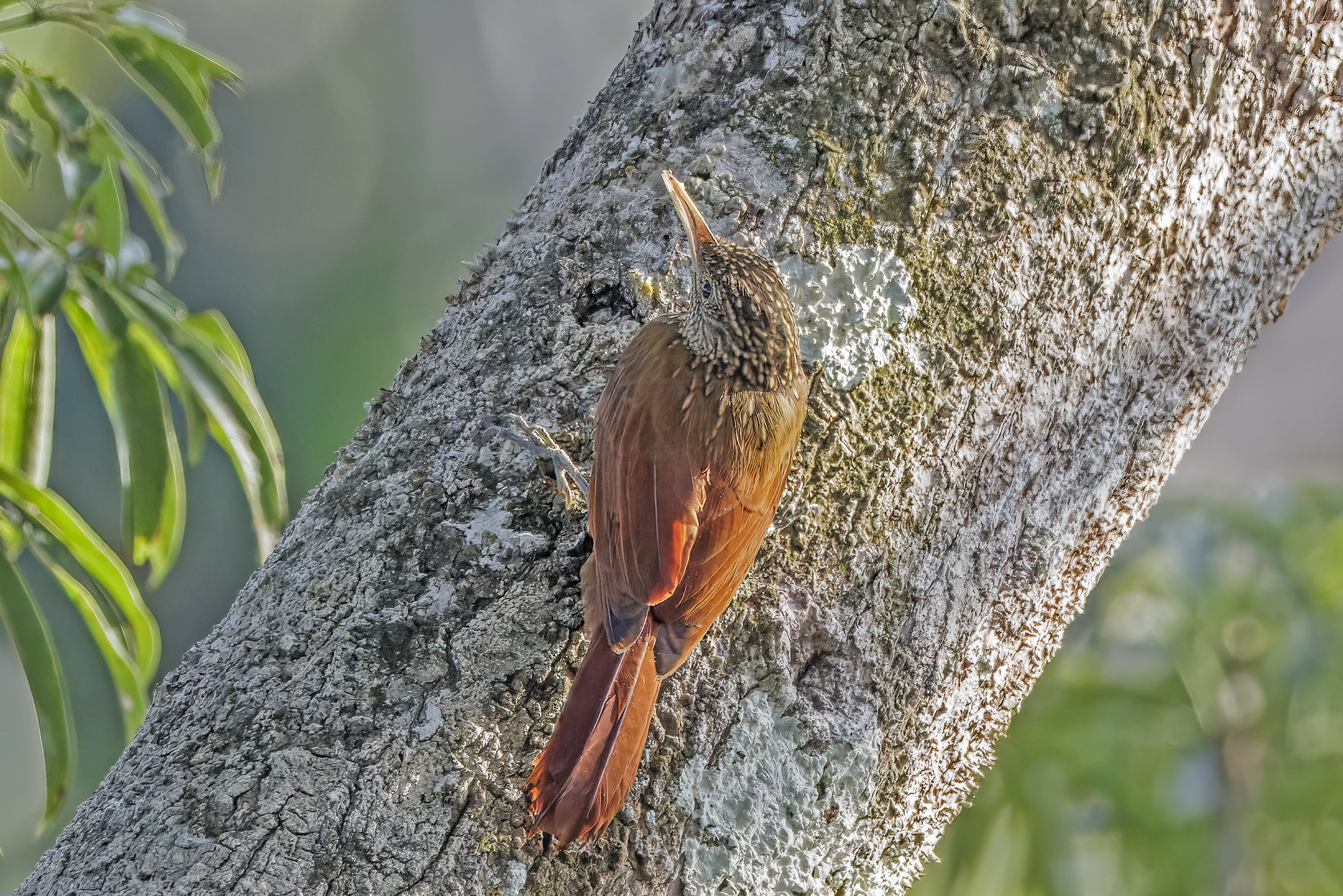
- D. p. peruvianus in Ecuador

Conservation status
- Least Concern (IUCN 3.1)

Scientific classification
- Kingdom: Animalia
- Phylum: Chordata
- Class: Aves
- Order: Passeriformes
- Family: Furnariidae
- Genus: Dendroplex
- Species: D. picus

Binomial name
- Dendroplex picus (Gmelin, JF, 1788)

Synonyms
- Xiphorhynchus picus

= Straight-billed woodcreeper =

Species of bird

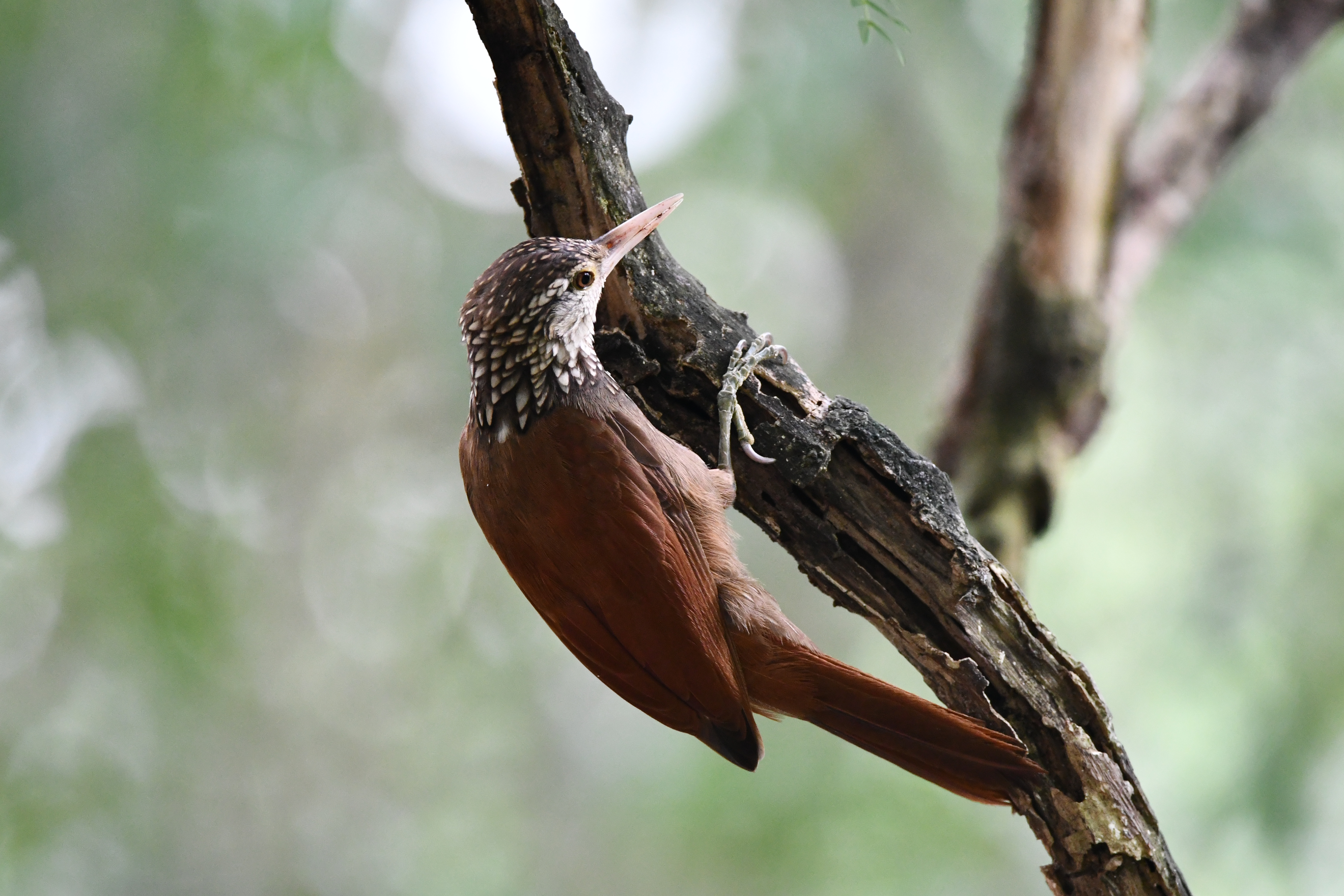
In Panama

The straight-billed woodcreeper (Dendroplex picus) is a species of bird in the subfamily Dendrocolaptinae of the ovenbird family Furnariidae. It is found in Panama, Trinidad, and in every mainland South American country except Chile, Argentina, Paraguay and Uruguay.

== Taxonomy and systematics ==
The straight-billed woodcreeper was formally described in 1788 by the German naturalist Johann Friedrich Gmelin in his revised and expanded edition of Carl Linnaeus's Systema Naturae. He placed it with the orioles in the genus Oriolus and coined the binomial name Oriolus picus. The specific epithet picus is the Latin word for a woodpecker. Gmelin based his description on "Le pic-grimpereaux" from Cayenne that had been described and illustrated in 1780 by the French polymath, the Comte de Buffon. The straight-billed woodcreeper was later moved to genus Dendroplex that was introduced in 1827 by William Swainson. In the 1950s genus Dendroplex was merged into genus Xyphorhynchus but in the early 2000s it was resurrected for this species and Zimmer's woodcreeper (D. kienerii).

Thirteen subspecies of the straight-billed woodcreeper are recognized.

- D. p. extimus Griscom, 1927
- D. p. dugandi Wetmore & Phelps, WH, 1946
- D. p. picirostris Lafresnaye, 1847
- D. p. saturatior Hellmayr, 1925
- D. p. choicus Wetmore & Phelps, WH, 1946
- D. p. paraguanae (Phelps, WH & Phelps, WH Jr, 1962)
- D. p. longirostris Richmond, 1896
- D. p. altirostris (Léotaud, 1866)
- D. p. phalarus Wetmore, 1939
- D. p. deltanus (Phelps, WH & Phelps, WH Jr, 1952)
- D. p. picus (Gmelin, JF, 1788)
- D. p. duidae Zimmer, JT, 1934
- D. p. peruvianus Zimmer, JT, 1934

The northernmost group of subspecies (D. p. extimus through D. p. deltanus) and the southern group (D. p. picus, D. p. duidae, and D. p. peruvianus) have been proposed by some authors as separate species. D. p. deltanus has also by itself been proposed for species status, and several other subspecies have been proposed as splits of existing ones. None of these proposals have been widely accepted.

== Description ==
The straight-billed woodcreeper is 18 to 22 cm (7.1 to 8.7 in) long. Males weigh 34 to 42 g (1.2 to 1.5 oz), mainland females 33 to 45 g (1.2 to 1.6 oz), and a female from Trinidad weighed 51 g (1.8 oz). It is a slim, medium-sized woodcreeper. Its bill is distinctive, with a straight culmen on the maxilla and a mandible that curves upward. The sexes have the same plumage. Adults of the nominate subspecies D. p. picus have an indistinct pale supercilium and eyering, a dusky stripe behind the eye, and brown ear coverts with wide buffy white streaks. Their forehead is whitish. Their crown and nape are dark brown to blackish with buffy white streaks that are larger on the nape. Their upper back, scapulars, and lesser wing coverts are warm olive-brown to reddish brown; the rest of the wing coverts are more rufescent. Their upper back has a few thin pale streaks. Their lower back, rump, flight feathers, and tail are rufous-chestnut. Their flight feather have dusky tips and their inner tail feathers are darker than the others and the rump. Their chin and throat are buffy white with a dark brown to black scaly appearance that extends onto the upper breast. The rest of their underparts are brown with some olive on the belly. The scales on the upper breast become more linear on the lower breast, sides, and flanks but do not extend to the belly. Their undertail coverts have thin buffy-whitish streaks, and their underwing coverts are cinnamon-rufous. Their iris is reddish brown to dark brown. Their bill is light grayish horn or brownish to dull whitish; the base of the maxilla is dusky or blackish and the mandible is often paler than the maxilla. Their legs and feet are highly variable from green to gray and brownish. Juveniles are similar to adults but darker overall, with a deeper buff throat, smaller spots and streaks that are however more extensive and deeper buff on the underparts, and a shorter and darker bill.

The other subspecies of the straight-billed woodcreeper differ from the nominate and each other thus:

- D. p. picirostris, paler but more rufous upperparts than nominate, more boldly marked, whitish crown and back spots with black borders, ear coverts and supercilium whitish, throat and upper breast almost white
- D. p. extimus, similar to picirostris but more brownish than rufous
- D. p. dugandi, more extensive black around crown and back spots than picirostris, darker than picirostris and paler than extimus
- D. p. saturatior, much darker than nominate and less breast streaking
- D. p. choicus similar to dugandi but lighter overall and weaker dark surrounds on crown and back spots
- D. p. longirostris, similar to picirostris but larger, with longer and heavier bill, wider breast spots, darker less rufescent belly, and deeper chestnut back, wings, and tail
- D. p. paraguanae, longer bill, whiter throat, and lighter more yellowish-tinged upperparts than most; lighter brown underparts than longirostris
- D. p. altirostris, longer, heavier, and more curved bill than nominate; larger and more extensive spots on underparts
- D. p. phalarus, like longirostris but with larger crown and nape spots and buffier breast spots
- D. p. duidae, pure white throat, browner back, more spotting on breast and with black outlines, stronger streaks on belly
- D. p. deltanus, darker than duidae; darker bill, crown, and tail and more heavily streaked upper back than nominate
- D. p. peruvianus, brighter and more rufescent than nominate, with deeper buff throat

== Distribution and habitat ==
The subspecies of the straight-billed woodcreeper are found thus:

- D. p. extimus, central and eastern Panama (mostly on Pacific slope) and northwestern Colombia's Córdoba Department
- D. p. dugandi, inland northwestern Colombia from the area of Santa Marta east to the Serranía del Perijá, south on the Pacific coast to northern Chocó Department, and in the valley of the Magdalena River
- D. p. picirostris, coastal northern Colombia from the Santa Marta area into extreme northwestern Venezuela to Lake Maracaibo
- D. p. saturatior, eastern side of Colombia's Eastern Andes and the Andes of western Venezuela
- D. p. choicus, coastal north-central Venezuela from Falcón east to Miranda
- D. p. paraguanae, northwestern Venezuela's Falcón and Lara states
- D. p. longirostris, Margarita Island off northern Venezuela
- D. p. altirostris, Trinidad
- D. p. phalarus, the llanos and northeastern coast of Venezuela
- D. p. deltanus, northeastern Venezuela's Delta Amacuro state
- D. p. picus, southern Venezuela, the Guianas and north, central, and eastern Brazil from the Negro River east to the Atlantic and south to Goiás and Rio de Janeiro states
- D. p. duidae, upper reaches of the Orinoco and Negro rivers in eastern Colombia, southern Venezuela, and northwestern Brazil
- D. p. peruvianus, the southwestern Amazon Basin of eastern Peru, northern and eastern Bolivia, and southwestern Brazil

The population of the straight-billed woodcreeper north of the Amazon River in northwestern Brazil, and southwestern Brazil's Pantanal, southeastern Colombia, and eastern Ecuador may belong to either D. p. picus or D. p. peruvianus.

The straight-billed woodcreeper inhabits a wide variety of lowland habitats, most of which are open to semi-open rather than densely forested. These include the edges of dense forest, open woodland, wooded savanna, deciduous and gallery forest, seasonally flooded várzea and igapó forest, river islands, secondary forest, mangroves, thorn scrub, and plantations. In elevation it is mostly found below 600 m (2,000 ft) but only to 300 m (980 ft) in Panama. Higher, it reaches about 700 m (2,300 ft) in Colombia, 1,100 m (3,600 ft) in Peru, and 1,400 m (4,600 ft) in Venezuela.

== Behavior ==
=== Movement ===
The straight-billed woodcreeper is believed to be a year-round resident throughout its range.

=== Feeding ===
The straight-billed woodcreeper's diet is mostly arthropods but includes other invertebrates like snails and small vertebrates like lizards as well. It typically forages singly and less often in pairs and family groups. It occasionally joins mixed-species feeding flocks. It forages by hitching up and along trunks and branches, usually between the top of the understory and the subcanopy but also sometimes lower and higher. It mostly gleans and picks prey from bark and bark crevices and less often probes dead wood, dead leaf clusters, and arboreal termite nests. It has only once been observed following an army ant swarm.

=== Breeding ===
The straight-billed woodcreeper's breeding seasons vary widely across its very large range, generally beginning in April or earlier in the north and around September in the south. It nests in a cavity, either natural or made by a woodpecker in a tree, cactus, dead stump or arboreal termite nest. It also has nested in fence posts, nest boxes, and crevices between palm fronds and in bromeliads and epiphytes. It sometimes lines the floor of the cavity with bark chips and softer plant material. The usual clutch size is two or three eggs, though sometimes only one. The incubation period is 17 days and fledging occurs 17 or 18 days after hatch. Both parents are believed to incubate the eggs and brood the nestlings.

=== Vocalization ===
The straight-billed woodcreeper sings mostly at dawn and dusk, starting early and ending late, but it also sings intermittently during the day. In Amazonia it sings "a rapid series of c. 25–40 high-frequency notes in 2–3 seconds, begins as a few sharp stuttered notes followed by accelerating series of descending notes that slows at end, notes given slowly enough to be counted, 'chip, chip, chip, dip-dip-dii-dii-di-di-di-di-di-di, dew, dew, dew'." In Venezuela its song is slower and with fewer notes "chip, chip-chip-chip-dip-dip-dip-di-di-di-di-di-di-di, dip, dip, wik-up, wik-up, wik-up, wik". Its calls include "dit", "chip", and "tschup".

== Status ==
The IUCN has assessed the straight-billed woodcreeper as being of Least Concern. It has an extremely large range and an estimated population of at least five million mature individuals. No immediate threats have been identified. It is considered fairly common to common except in Amazonia, where denser forest reduces it to less common and more local. "A widespread habitat generalist; preference for open country, second growth, edge and human-altered environments reveals comparatively low sensitivity to human disturbance."
