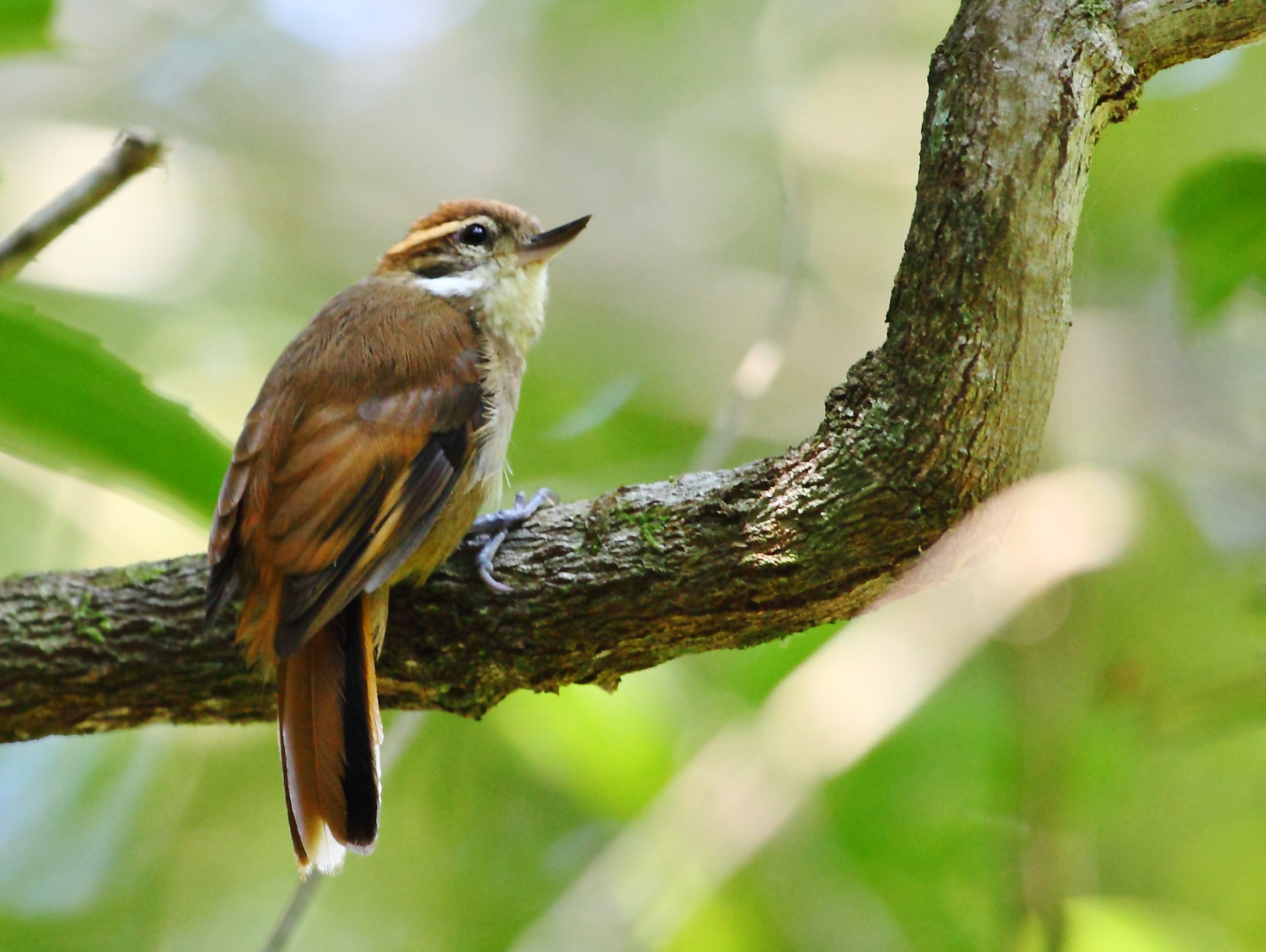

Conservation status
- Least Concern (IUCN 3.1)

Scientific classification
- Kingdom: Animalia
- Phylum: Chordata
- Class: Aves
- Order: Passeriformes
- Family: Furnariidae
- Genus: Xenops
- Species: X. minutus

Binomial name
- Xenops minutus (Sparrman, 1788)

= Atlantic plain xenops =

Species of bird

The Atlantic plain xenops (Xenops minutus), also known as the white-throated xenops, is a passerine bird in the Furnariinae subfamily of the ovenbird family Furnariidae. It is found in Argentina, Brazil, and Paraguay.

== Taxonomy and systematics ==
The Atlantic plain xenops has a complicated taxonomic history. Xenops minutus was long called the "plain xenops" and included 11 subspecies. In 2016 BirdLife International's Handbook of the Birds of the World (HBW) separated X. genibarbis, with 10 of the 11 subspecies, from X. minutus and confusingly called the new species "plain xenops". HBW renamed X. minutus the "white-throated xenops". The International Ornithological Committee (IOC) recognized the split in July 2023 and kept the HBW English names.

A study published in 2020 described differences in plumage, vocalizations and DNA among the subspecies of X. genibabis. Based on it and other studies, in August 2024 the IOC further split X. genibarbis into two species, the northern plain xenops (X. mexicanus) and Amazonian plain xenops (X. genibarbis). It renamed X. minutus the Atlantic plain xenops. The South American Classification Committee of the American Ornithological Society (SACC) adopted the three-way split with the IOC English names in September 2024. The Clements taxonomy adopted the same split and English names in October 2024. However, as of December 2024 HBW retains the earlier names of "white-throated xenops" for X. minutus and "plain xenops", with 10 subspecies, for X. genibarbis. As of August 2024 the North American Classification Committee of the American Ornithological Society has not adopted the splits and retains the name "plain xenops" for X. minutus sensu lato.

The Atlantic plain xenops is monotypic: No subspecies are recognized.

== Description ==
The Atlantic plain xenops is about 12 cm (4.7 in) long and weighs about 10 to 13 g (0.35 to 0.46 oz). Its bill is wedge-shaped, fairly stubby, and slightly upturned. The sexes are alike and juveniles resemble adults. Adults have a conspicuous buff or whitish supercilium and a wide pure white malar stripe. Their upperparts are dull brown to rufous brown and unstreaked; their crown is darker and lightly streaked. Their tail is cinnamon with much black. Their wings are also cinnamon, with a wide tawny or ochraceous band on the flight feathers. Their throat is pale with little or no streaking. The rest of their underparts are plain dull grayish brown. Their iris is dark brown, their maxilla dull black, their mandible dull grayish white with a dark gray tip, and their legs and feet bluish gray.

== Distribution and habitat ==
The Atlantic plain xenops is found in eastern and southeastern Brazil from Bahia state south to Santa Catarina state, eastern Paraguay, and northern Argentina's Misiones Province. It inhabits the interior and edges of a variety of forested landscapes including terra firme forests in the tropical lowlands, semideciduous forest, mature secondary forest, and gallery forest. In elevation it occurs from sea level to 1,500 m (4,900 ft).

== Behavior ==
=== Movement ===
The Atlantic plain xenops is a year-round resident throughout its range.

=== Feeding ===
The Atlantic plain xenops' diet is almost entirely arthropods, both adult and larval. It has been recorded eating termites, Hymenoptera like ants and bees, beetles, katydids, millipedes, and spiders. It typically forages from the forest understory to its mid level but does ascend to the canopy. It often joins mixed-species foraging flocks. It captures prey by gleaning, hammering, chiseling, and prying with its upturned bill. It does much of its foraging on fairly thin dead branches, often rotten ones and those that have fallen into the understory, and also feeds along vines.

=== Breeding ===
The Atlantic plain xenops' breeding biology has not been studied but is assumed to be similar to that of its former "parent" species, the plain xenops, for which see here: Plain xenops#Breeding.

=== Vocalization ===
The Atlantic plain xenops' song is a "series of 4-7 upslurred (or underslurred) notes, the first one often slightly lower pitched and subdued: wee-kwee-kwee-kwee-kweet!" Its call is a "short emphatic upslurred note kweet!, uttered singly or several times with intervals of typically 1.5‒3s".

== Status ==
The IUCN has assessed the Atlantic plain xenops as being of Least Concern. It has a fairly large range, but its population size is not known and is believed to be decreasing. No immediate threats have been identified.
