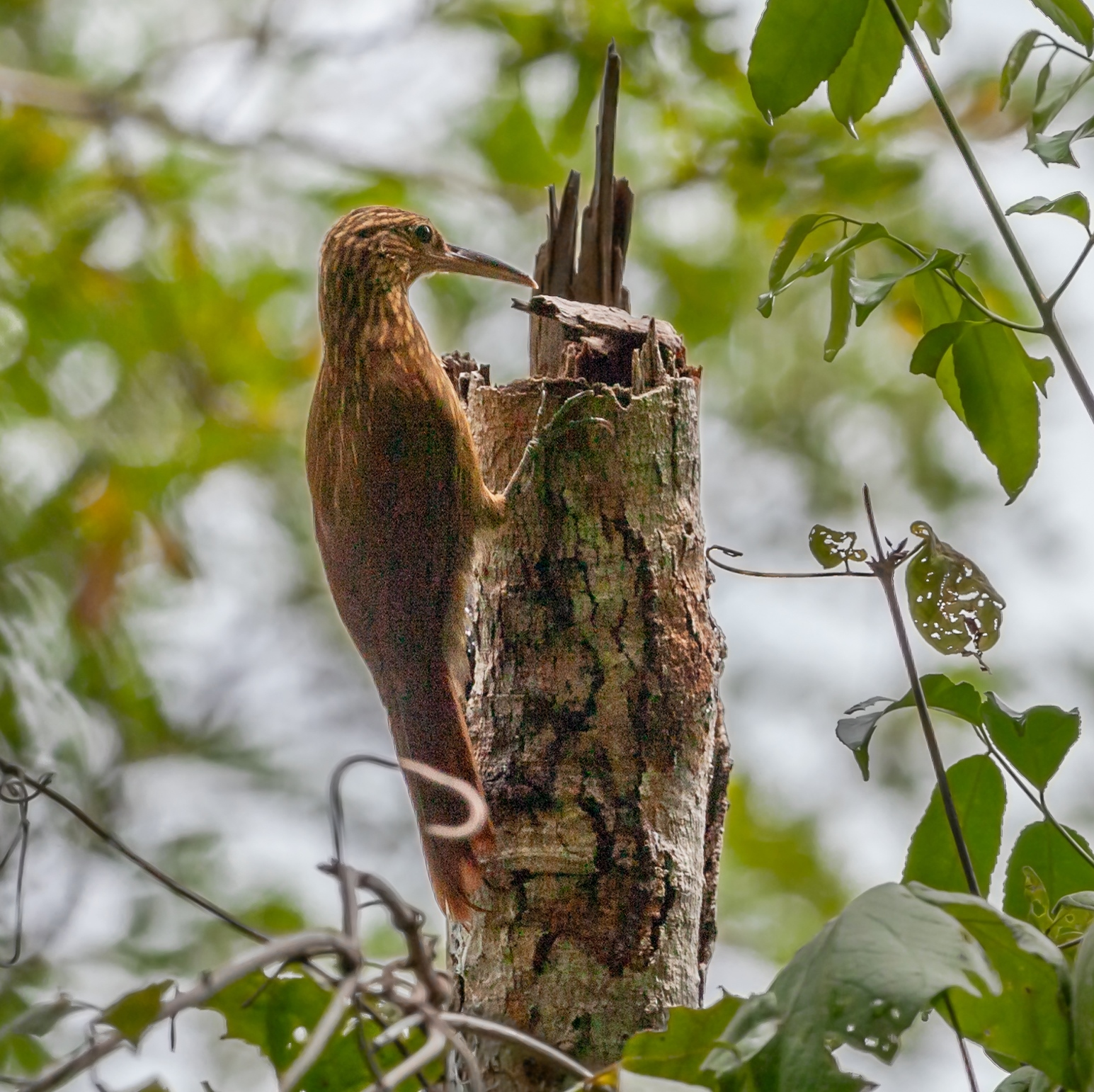
- In Rio Grande do Norte

Conservation status
- Least Concern (IUCN 3.1)

- Least Concern (IUCN 3.1)

Scientific classification
- Kingdom: Animalia
- Phylum: Chordata
- Class: Aves
- Order: Passeriformes
- Family: Furnariidae
- Genus: Xiphorhynchus
- Species: X. guttatus

Binomial name
- Xiphorhynchus guttatus (Lichtenstein, MHC, 1820)

Subspecies
- See text

Synonyms
- Dendrocolaptes guttatus Lichtenstein, 1820

= Buff-throated woodcreeper =

Species of bird

The buff-throated woodcreeper (Xiphorhynchus guttatus) is a species of bird in the subfamily Dendrocolaptinae of the ovenbird family Furnariidae. It is found in Bolivia, Brazil, Colombia, Ecuador, French Guiana, Guyana, Peru, Suriname, and Venezuela.

== Taxonomy and systematics ==
What is now the cocoa woodcreeper (X. susurrans) of Central America and northwestern South America was long considered conspecific with the buff-throated woodcreeper, but since the 1990s has been treated as a distinct species. The two form a superspecies.

The buff-throated woodcreeper's remaining taxonomy is unsettled. The South American Classification Committee of the American Ornithological Society, the International Ornithological Committee (IOC), and the Clements taxonomy assign it these eight subspecies. Clements subdivides them into three groups.

"Buff-throated" group

- X. g. polystictus (Salvin & Goodman, 1883)
- X. g. connectens Todd, 1948
- X. g. guttatus (Lichtenstein, MHC, 1820)

"Lafresnaye's" group

- X. g. guttatoides (Lafresnaye, 1850)
- X. g. dorbignyanus Lafresnaye, 1850)

"Dusky-billed" group, also called the "eytoni" group

- X. g. eytoni Sclater, PL, 1854
- X. g. vicinalis Todd, 1948
- X. g. gracilirostris Pinto & Camargo, 1957

Birdlife International's Handbook of the Birds of the World (HBW) assigns the five subspecies of the "Lafresnaye's" and "dusky-billed" groups to "Lafresnaye's woodcreeper" (X. guttatoides), retaining only the three "buff-throated" subspecies within X. guttatus.

Other authors treat the "Lafresnaye's" and "dusky-billed" groups as separate species, and they appear to be more closely related to each other than to the superspecies formed by the "buff-throated" group and the cocoa woodcreeper. Subspecies X. g. gracilirostris is almost indistinguishable from eytoni and some authors do not accept it. Biogeography and molecular data suggest that the relationships among all eight subspecies and the taxa now included in X. susurrans deserve further study.

Depending on the outcome of these studies, the name buff-throated woodcreeper could be restricted to X. g. guttatus alone, which is endangered by habitat fragmentation, making a change in conservation status necessary.

The most likely evolutionary scenario is that from lower Amazonia, the ancestors of Lafresnaye's woodcreeper spread west- and southwestwards to the Andes, and those of the buff-throated and cocoa woodcreeper downriver and then along the coast of northern South America, where X. susurrans then branched off as the northern lineage. Indeed, it may be that the trans-Andean forms of the latter may constitute yet another good species, Lawrence's woodcreeper.

This article follows the eight-subspecies model.

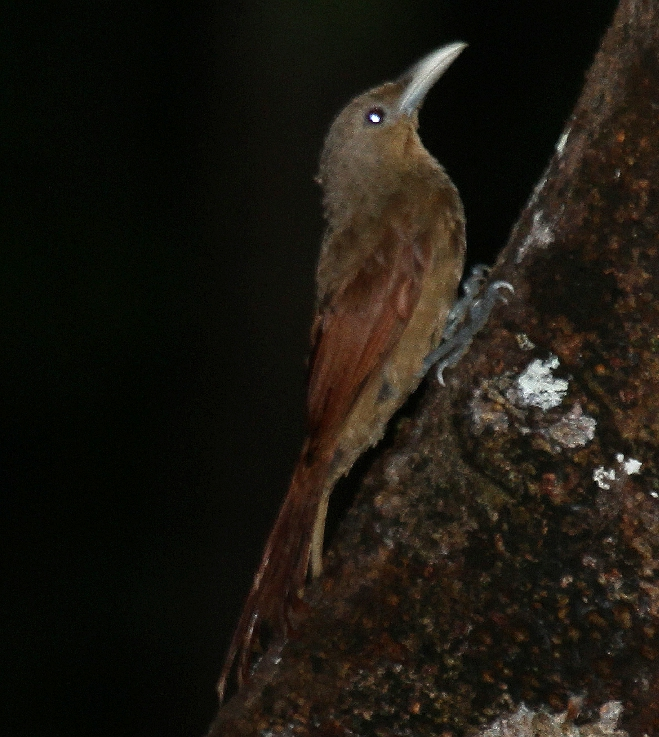
X. g. guttatoides at Amazonia Lodge, Peru (flash photo)

== Description ==
The buff-throated woodcreeper is 22.5 to 29.5 cm (8.9 to 12 in) long and weighs 45 to 74 g (1.6 to 2.6 oz). It is the largest member of genus Xiphorhynchus, with a heavy body and a long, heavy, decurved bill. The sexes have the same plumage. Adults of the nominate subspecies X. g. guttatus have a dark brown face with narrow whitish buff streaks. Their crown and nape are dark brown with buff teardrop spots that are streakier and blackish-edged on the nape. Their back and wing coverts are reddish olive-brown, with buff streaks with blackish edges on the back. Their lower back and rump are cinnamon-rufous, their flight feathers darker rufous with dusky brownish tips on the primaries, and their tail rufous-chestnut. Their throat is deep buff with a dusky lower edge. Their breast, sides, and belly are reddish brown that becomes redder on the undertail coverts. Their breast and sides have black-edged deep buff streaks that narrow on the belly. Their undertail coverts are mostly unstreaked. Their underwing coverts are cinnamon-rufous to ochraceous buff. Their iris is dark brown, their bill dark brownish black with a paler culmen and an even paler mandible, and their legs and feet blue, greenish gray, or dark gray. Juveniles have a shorter and blacker bill than adults, a more rufous belly, and wider streaks with blacker edges above and below.

The other subspecies of the buff-throated woodcreeper differ from the nominate thus:

- X. g. polystictus, much darker crown than back; back has wide buff streaks with wide black edges
- X. g. connectens, similar to polystictus with deeper buff underparts and heavier, deeper buff, streaking on crown, nape, and underparts
- X. g. guttatoides, pale horn bill, overall more rufescent, crown darker than back, throat richer buff, richer buff with weaker dark edges streaking above and below
- X. g. dorbignyanus, paler bill than guttatoides, paler and more olive overall than nominate, crown and back nearly the same color, narrow streaks with little or no dark edges above and below
- X. g. eytoni, slimmer mostly blackish bill, more olive upperparts, richer rufous rump, grayer underparts, whiter throat, whiter streaking with sharp black margins above and below
- X. g. vicinalis, blackish bill, whitish throat, strongly rufescent underparts, buffier and heavier streaks than eytoni
- X. g. gracilirostris, similar to eytoni with longer, slimmer, and more decurved bill

== Distribution and habitat ==
The subspecies of the buff-throated woodcreeper are found thus:

- X. g. polystictus, Rio Orinoco drainage in eastern Colombia, southern and eastern Venezuela, and extreme northern Brazil; east to the Guyanas.
- X. g. connectens, north of the Amazon River from about Manaus east to Amapá.
- X. g. guttatus, coastal eastern Brazil from Rio Grande do Norte south to Espírito Santo and slightly into Rio de Janeiro state
- X. g. guttatoides, the western Amazon Basin on both sides of the Amazon from southern Venezuela, southeastern Colombia, eastern Ecuador, eastern and southeastern Peru, and northwestern Brazil east to the Rio Negro and Rio Madeira and south into Mato Grosso
- X. g. dorbignyanus, the southern Amazon Basin from northern and eastern Bolivia east into Brazil as far as central Goiás
- X. g. eytoni, Brazil south of the Amazon from Rio Tapajós east to western Maranhão.
- X. g. vicinalis, Brazil south of the Amazon from Rio Madeira east to Rio Tapajós
- X. g. gracilirostris, Serra do Baturité in northeastern Brazil's Ceará state

The buff-throated woodcreeper generally inhabits humid evergreen forest, but varies in details across its very large range. Within the "buff-throated" group, the nominate X. g. guttatus is restricted to the humid tropical Atlantic forest. The other two subspecies of the group inhabit semi-deciduous and gallery forest, palm swamps, treed areas of savanna, cerrado woodlands, and mangroves. The subspecies of the "Lafresnaye's" group, like the northern "buff-throated" subspecies, occur in semi-deciduous and gallery forest, palm swamps, treed areas of savanna, and cerrado woodlands. Populations in the Amazon Basin inhabit terra firme, floodplain forest, and both várzea and igapó types of seasonally flooded forest. Those of the "dusky-billed" group favor terra firme while the others favor the other three forest types and also extend into evergreen montane forest along the Andes. All of the subspecies favor the edges of the forest, gaps within it, and older secondary forest, but they regularly occur in the interior of primary forest as well. In elevation most individuals occur between sea level and 800 m (2,600 ft). X. g. polystictus reaches 1,200 m (3,900 ft) in Colombia and 1,250 m (4,100 ft) in the tepui region where Venezuela, Guyana, and Brazil meet. X. g. dorbignyanus reaches 1,100 m (3,600 ft) in Bolivia.

== Behavior ==
=== Movement ===
All subspecies of the buff-throated woodcreeper are believed to be year-round residents of their respective ranges.

=== Feeding ===
The buff-throated woodcreeper's diet is mostly arthropods but also occasionally includes small vertebrates. It usually forages singly and occasionally in pairs; three have been observed together at army ant swarms. It regularly joins mixed-species feeding flocks, usually foraging from the forest's mid-level to the subcanopy but sometimes lower and higher. It also regularly follows army ant swarms. It hitches up and along trunks and branches, gleaning and pecking for prey on those substrates, on palm fronds, and in dead leaf clusters, epiphytes, dead wood, and arboreal termite nests. It also sometimes flakes bark, and when following ants makes sallies from a perch to glean from the ground and foliage or make mid-air captures.

=== Breeding ===
The buff-throated woodcreeper's breeding season varies widely across its large range. Northern populations breed during the first half of the year while those further south tend to breed later. The species nests in cavities in dead trees, either natural or made by woodpeckers. Their clutch is one to three eggs (usually two). The incubation period, time to fledging, and details of parental care are not known.

=== Vocalization ===
All of the buff-throated woodcreeper subspecies are quite vocal; during their breeding seasons they sing for long periods at dawn and dusk and occasionally throughout the day. The subspecies, however, differ in their songs. The nominate subspecies sings "te-e-e-e-e-e-e-e-e, quirt-quirt-quirt-quirt", while X. g. polystictus and X. g. connectens singe a "loud...descending whinny of 20–25 notes, 'dui-dui-kui'kui'kui'kui'kui'kui'ku'u'u'ut, ut'." Populations in western Amazonia sing "a series 3–4 seconds long of melancholy whistles that ascends, levels, then descends and decreases in both volume and speed, 'tep, tep, tep teep-twee-tweep-tweep-tweep-teep-teep-tee-tee-toe-toe-toe' ". Those in southeastern Amazonia sing "a long, rapid trill that descends, then trails off, 'whe-e-e-e-e-e-e-e-ew-ew-ew-ew-ew-ew whoit whoit whoit whoit'." The species' calls do not appear to differ much among the subspecies, and include "a descending series of 3–6 loud whistles, e.g. 'wheeyer, wheep-wheep-wheep-wheep-whip', sometimes doubled as 'fee-a-wip, fee-a-wip, wip-wip'; also [a] piercing whistle described as 'feeyou' or 'pyeeeu'."

== Status ==
The IUCN follows HBW taxonomy and therefore separately assesses the "buff-throated" and "Lefresnaye's" woodcreepers. However, both are assessed as being of Least Concern. They have large to very large ranges. Their population sizes are not known and both are believed to be decreasing. No immediate threats to either have been identified. The nominate subspecies is "largely restricted to scattered fragments of lowland Atlantic Forest, and likely to be moderately to highly sensitive to continued loss of forest." The other two subspecies of the "buff-throated" group are considered fairly common to common, and "probably only moderately sensitive to disturbance". The five subspecies of the "Lefresnaye's" group are also considered fairly common to common across most of their range. They are mostly "dependent on intact but not necessarily undisturbed forest, with most populations inhabiting a region with much forest remaining and probably only moderately sensitive to disturbance."
