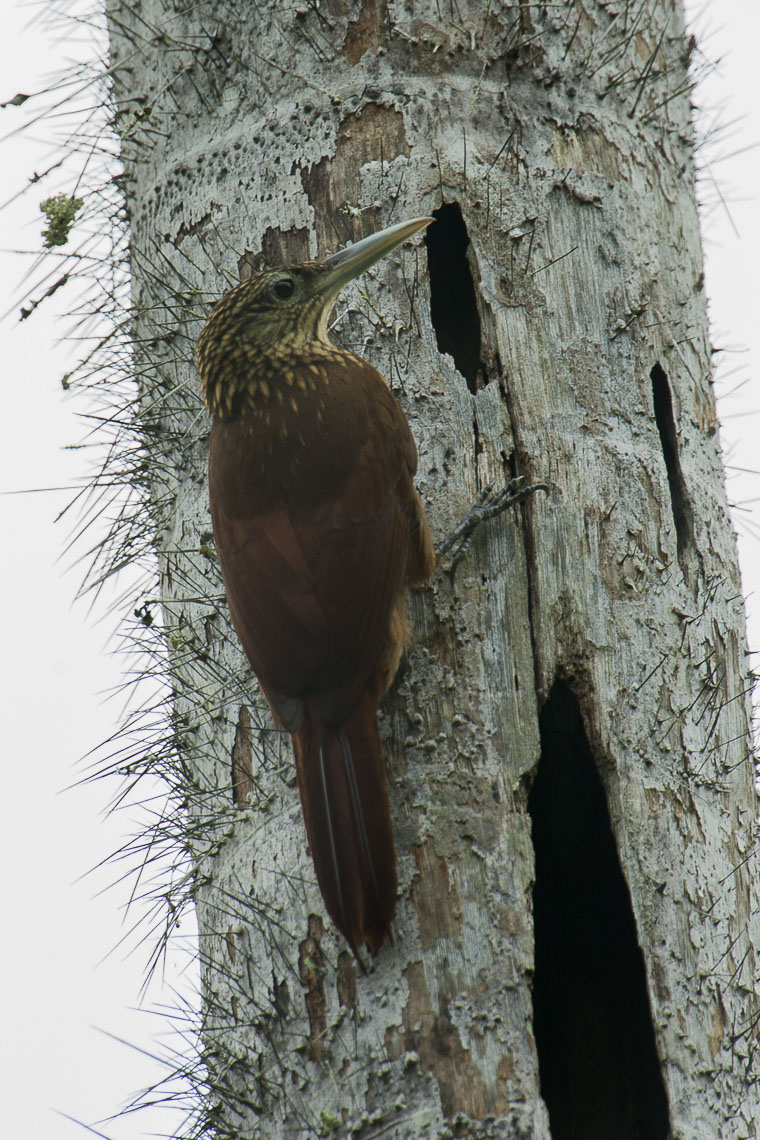

Scientific classification
- Kingdom: Animalia
- Phylum: Chordata
- Class: Aves
- Order: Passeriformes
- Family: Furnariidae
- Genus: Xiphorhynchus
- Species: X. guttatus
- Subspecies: X. g. guttatoides

Trinomial name
- Xiphorhynchus guttatus guttatoides (Lafresnaye, 1850)

= Lafresnaye's woodcreeper =

Lafesnaye's woodcreeper

Subspecies of bird

Lafresnaye's woodcreeper (Xiphorhynchus guttatus guttatoides) is a resident passerine bird found in tropical South America in the western and southern Amazon and adjacent sections of the Cerrado. It is often considered a subspecies of the buff-throated woodcreeper, but this combined "species" would be polyphyletic. It includes the dusky-billed woodcreeper (Xiphorhynchus guttatoides eytoni), which sometimes is considered a separate species (see Taxonomy).

== Description ==
With a total length of 25–28 cm (10–11 in), this woodcreeper is, together with buff-throated woodcreeper, the largest member of the genus Xiphorhynchus. The wings and tail are rufous. The head, mantle and underparts are olive-brown streaked buff (subspecies X. g. guttatoides and X. g. dorbignyanus) or whitish (X. g. eytoni, X. g. gracilirostris and X. g. vicinalis). The bill is long, slightly decurved, and hooked at the tip. The bill is mainly pale horn (X. g. guttatoides and X. g. dorbignyanus) or blackish (X. g. eytoni, X. g. gracilirostris and X. g. vicinalis).

== Ecology ==
Lafresnaye's woodcreeper is restricted to forest and woodland. In its range, it is generally the commonest large woodcreeper. It is an insectivores, which feeds on ants and other insects and spiders. It feeds low in trees, usually alone, but groups will follow columns of army ants. The species builds a bark-lined nest in a tree hole or hollow stump and lays two white eggs.

== Taxonomy ==
The species's taxonomy is highly complex. It has often been considered a subspecies of the buff-throated woodcreeper, but molecular data indicates that this species is closer the cocoa woodcreeper than it is to Lafresnaye's woodcreeper. Alternatively, the eytoni group (incl. vicinalis and gracilirostris) has been considered a separate species, the dusky-billed woodcreeper (Xiphorhynchus (guttatoides) eytoni), but, despite its different looks, it is better considered a subspecies of Lafresnaye's woodcreeper.

Biogeography and molecular data suggest that the relationship between these taxa and the buff-throated woodcreeper deserves further study.

However, of the major taxonomic systems, only Birdlife International's Handbook of the Birds of the World (HBW) treats Lafresnaye's woodcreeper as a species. The South American Classification Committee of the American Ornithological Society, the International Ornithological Committee (IOC), and the Clements taxonomy include its five subspecies with three others in the buff-throated woodcreeper (X guttatus). For full details of these eight subspecies see the buff-throated article.
