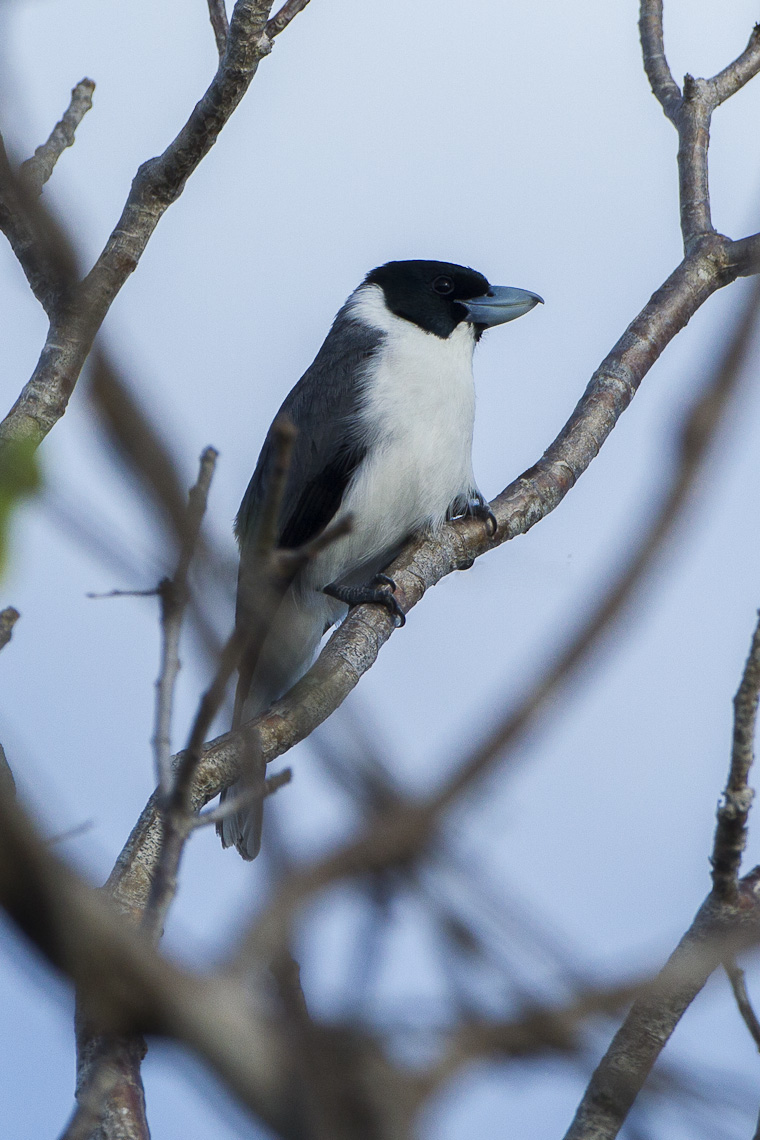

Conservation status
- Near Threatened (IUCN 3.1)

Scientific classification
- Kingdom: Animalia
- Phylum: Chordata
- Class: Aves
- Order: Passeriformes
- Family: Vangidae
- Genus: Xenopirostris
- Species: X. xenopirostris

Binomial name
- Xenopirostris xenopirostris (Lafresnaye, 1850)

= Lafresnaye's vanga =

Species of bird

Lafresnaye's vanga (Xenopirostris xenopirostris) is a species of bird in the vanga family Vangidae. The species is monotypic and one of three species in the genus Xenopirostris. It is endemic to the south and south west of Madagascar. It inhabits sub-arid thorn scrub, in the Madagascar spiny forests ecoregion, particularly areas with large amounts of dead wood, from sea level to 100 m (330 ft). The species has a small range is not common within that range. It was uplisted from Least Concern to Near Threatened in 2022 as it is experiencing moderately rapid population decline owing to habitat degradation and loss within its range.

The common name for the species is derived from the French ornithologist who described it, Frédéric de Lafresnaye. The specific name notes the resemblance of the bill (rostris) to the genus Xenops.

Lafresnaye's vanga is a medium-sized vanga, 24 cm (9.4 in) in length and weighing 52 to 63 g (1.8–2.2 oz). The plumage is almost the same between males and females. The head of the male is black with a white crown, throat, breast and belly and grey wings and back. The female has more white in the head with only the crown being black. Juvenile birds resemble females, but with brown on the upperparts. The heavy bill is blueish grey, and the legs are grey-blue.

Lafresnaye's vanga feeds on insects such as beetles and cockroaches, worms and small reptiles. They carefully search fallen or otherwise dead branches and trees for prey, probing and gleaning from bark, inside crevices and off twigs. They usually forage alone or as a pair, although sometimes they form small flocks or join other foraging species. They are not thought to be migratory.

Very little is known about the breeding biology of this species. It builds a simple cup nest of vegetable matter strengthened with spider web. Two reddish-white eggs with reddish-grey spots are laid and incubated by both species.
