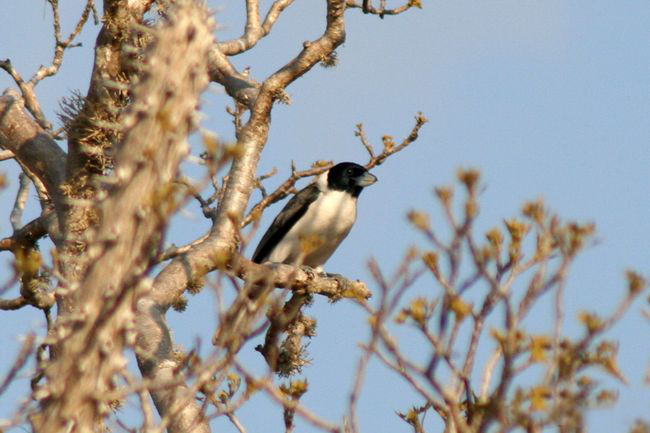
- Lafresnaye's vanga (Xenopirostris xenopirostris)

Scientific classification
- Kingdom: Animalia
- Phylum: Chordata
- Class: Aves
- Order: Passeriformes
- Family: Vangidae
- Genus: Xenopirostris; Bonaparte, 1850

Type species
- Vanga xenopirostris Lafresnaye, 1850

Species
- see text

= Xenopirostris =

Genus of birds

Xenopirostris is a genus of birds in the family Vangidae. They are all endemic to Madagascar.

== Species ==
It contains the following species:

Image	Scientific name	Common name	Distribution
	Xenopirostris damii	Van Dam's vanga	Madagascar.
	Xenopirostris polleni	Pollen's vanga	eastern Madagascar.
	Xenopirostris xenopirostris	Lafresnaye's vanga	Madagascar spiny forests
