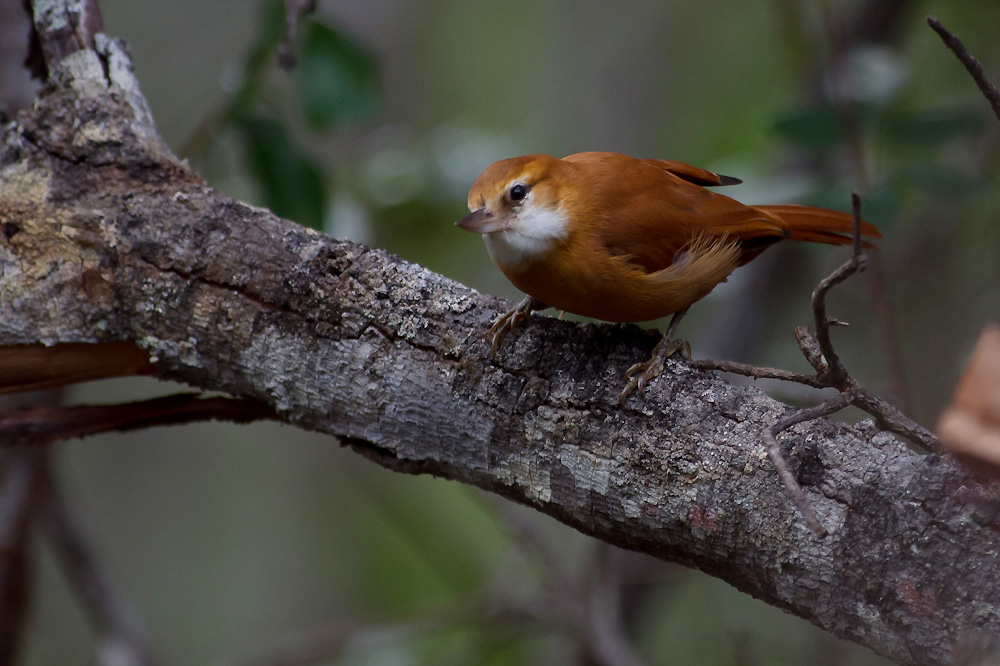

Conservation status
- Least Concern (IUCN 3.1)

Scientific classification
- Kingdom: Animalia
- Phylum: Chordata
- Class: Aves
- Order: Passeriformes
- Family: Furnariidae
- Genus: Megaxenops; Reiser, 1905
- Species: M. parnaguae

Binomial name
- Megaxenops parnaguae Reiser, 1905

= Great xenops =

Species of bird

The great xenops (Megaxenops parnaguae) is a species of bird in the Furnariinae subfamily of the ovenbird family Furnariidae. It is endemic to eastern Brazil.

== Taxonomy and systematics ==
The great xenops is the only member of its genus and has no subspecies. It is only very distantly related to the members of genus Xenops and is instead sister to two species of genus Philydor.

== Description ==
The great xenops is 15 to 16 cm (5.9 to 6.3 in) long. It has a heavy, wedge-shaped, slightly upturned bill. The sexes' plumages are alike. Adults have a mostly light orange-rufous face with some blackish around the eye. Their forehead is pale but bright cinnamon-buff. Their crown and upperparts are unmarked bright rufous and their tail bright cinnamon-rufous. Their wing coverts are bright rufous, their primary coverts dull brownish, and their flight feathers bright orange-rufous with dark fuscous tips. Their throat and malar area are white and the rest of their underparts mostly light orange-rufous. Their flanks are slightly darker and their undertail coverts more rufous. Their iris is dark brown, their bill dusky brownish gray with a white base to the mandible, and their legs and feet dark gray to black.

== Distribution and habitat ==
The great xenops is found in a diagonal band from Piauí and Ceará states southwest through Tocantins and Bahia into Minas Gerais and Goiás. It inhabits the caatinga ecoregion and the semi-humid woodlands and forest within it. In elevation it ranges from 200 to 1,100 m (700 to 3,600 ft).

== Behavior ==
=== Movement ===
The great xenops is a year-round resident throughout its range.

=== Feeding ===
The great xenops feeds on adult and larval arthropods including a variety of insects and spiders. It forages by itself and in pairs, and often (perhaps usually) joins mixed-species feeding flocks. It works its way along branches but does not use its tail for support while searching live and dead leaves and bark. It sometimes pulls or pries off bark.

=== Breeding ===
Nothing is known about the great xenops' breeding biology.

=== Vocalization ===
The great xenops' song is a "long, very high, loud, nervous, unstructured series of chattering or liquid 'toc-toc-' and 'Wic-wic' notes, rising and falling with sudden crescendos".

== Status ==
The IUCN assessed the great xenops in 1988 as Threatened, then in 1994 as Vulnerable, and since 2004 as being of Least Concern. It has a large range, and though its population size is not known it is believed to be stable. Its "populations are localised, and there has been rapid habitat loss in parts of its range...owing to conversion to irrigated and dry field agriculture, logging for charcoal production and intensive grazing". It is considered rare to locally fairly common and occurs in several protected areas. "Deforestation has dramatically reduced populations, even to point of local extinction, in some parts of range." However, it "tolerates a certain degree of habitat degradation, including disturbance and heavy grazing, and [has been] observed to forage in burnt areas".
