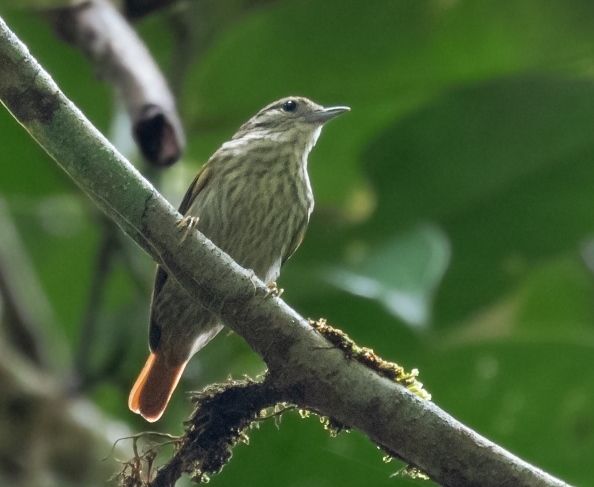

Conservation status
- Least Concern (IUCN 3.1)

Scientific classification
- Kingdom: Animalia
- Phylum: Chordata
- Class: Aves
- Order: Passeriformes
- Family: Furnariidae
- Genus: Microxenops; Chapman, 1914
- Species: M. milleri

Binomial name
- Microxenops milleri Chapman, 1914

= Rufous-tailed xenops =

Species of bird

The rufous-tailed xenops (Microxenops milleri) is a species of bird in the Furnariinae subfamily of the ovenbird family Furnariidae. It is found in Bolivia, Brazil, Colombia, Ecuador, Guyana, Peru, Suriname, Venezuela, and possibly French Guiana.

== Taxonomy and systematics ==
The rufous-tailed xenops was originally placed in genus Microxenops, which in the 1950s was merged into Xenops. By 2011 genetic data showed that it did not belong in Xenops and the previous Microxenops was restored.

The rufous-tailed xenops is the only member of its genus and has no subspecies.

== Description ==
The rufous-tailed xenops is 10 to 11 cm (3.9 to 4.3 in) long and weighs 12 to 13 g (0.42 to 0.46 oz). It has a thin straight bill. The sexes are alike. Adults have a mostly blackish brown face with a buff supercilium. Their crown is blackish brown with golden-buff feather shafts. Their back is dark rufescent brown with wide buff streaks that fade by the lower back. Their rump and uppertail coverts are rufescent. Their tail is dark rufous. Their wing coverts are blackish with rufescent brown edges and their flight feathers are blackish with a wide rufous band at their base. Their chin and throat are pale yellowish buff with dark olive flecks and stripes on the latter. Their breast is bright buff with crisp narrow dark olive-brown streaks that fade to the belly. Their belly is bright golden-buff with much light brownish streaking. Their undertail coverts are bright buff with light ochraceous brown streaks. Their iris is brown to dark brown, their maxilla black to brownish, their mandible blue-gray to leaden blue, and their legs and feet yellowish brown to olive.

== Distribution and habitat ==
The rufous-tailed xenops is found from southeastern Colombia east through southern Venezuela and southern Guyana at least into Suriname, south through eastern Ecuador and Peru into northwestern Bolivia, and from there east into Amazonian Brazil to Mato Grosso. It might also occur in French Guiana, but the South American Classification Committee of the American Ornithological Society classes it as hypothetical there because there are only undocumented sight records.

The rufous-tailed xenops inhabits tropical lowland and evergreen forest. It favors terra firme but also occurs in várzea forest. In elevation it occurs mostly below 600 m (2,000 ft) but reaches 1,100 m (3,600 ft) in Colombia and 1,000 m (3,300 ft) in Ecuador.

== Behavior ==
=== Movement ===
The rufous-tailed xenops is a year-round resident throughout its range.

=== Feeding ===
The rufous-tailed xenops feeds on arthropods; Orthoptera have been documented. It forages by itself and as part of mixed-species feeding flocks, usually in the forest's sub-canopy and canopy. It mostly gleans from bark, leaves, and moss to capture its prey while hitching along slender branches and vines. It hangs almost upside down to reach their bottoms.

=== Breeding ===
Nothing is known about the rufous-tailed xenops' breeding biology.

=== Vocalization ===
The rufous-tailed xenops' song is a short, fast, high-pitched trill that rises and falls as it increases and decreases in volume. Its call has not been described.

== Status ==
The IUCN has assessed the rufous-tailed xenops as being of Least Concern. It has a very large range, and though its population size is not known it is believed to be stable. No immediate threats have been identified. It is considered rare to locally fairly common, with an apparently patchy distribution. It occurs in many protected areas.
