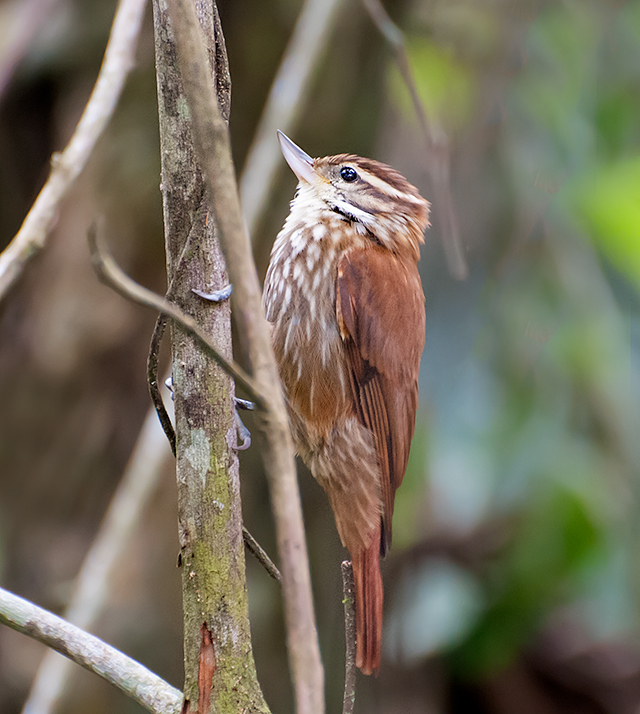
- In Piraju, São Paulo, Brazil

Conservation status
- Least Concern (IUCN 3.1)

Scientific classification
- Kingdom: Animalia
- Phylum: Chordata
- Class: Aves
- Order: Passeriformes
- Family: Furnariidae
- Genus: Xenops
- Species: X. rutilans

Binomial name
- Xenops rutilans Temminck, 1821

Synonyms
- Xenops rutilus

= Streaked xenops =

Species of bird

The streaked xenops (Xenops rutilans) is a passerine bird in the Furnariinae subfamily of the ovenbird family Furnariidae. It is found in the New World from Costa Rica and Trinidad south to Bolivia and Argentina.

== Taxonomy and systematics ==
Early on, the streaked xenops was assigned the binomial Xenops rutilus. In the mid-1900s 1900s taxonomists began using X. rutilans. By the principle of priority, the earlier rutilus is correct, but because of the long usage of rutilans, most systems have stayed with that specific epithet. A major exception is BirdLife International's Handbook of the Birds of the World (HBW), which uses X. rutilus.

The major worldwide taxonomic systems recognize these 11 subspecies:

- X. r. septentrionalis Zimmer, JT, 1929
- X r. Incomptus Wetmore, 1970
- X. r. heterurus Cabanis & Heine, 1860
- X.. r. Perijanus Phelps, WH & Phelps, WH Jr, 1954
- X. r. phelpsi Meyer de Schauensee, 1959
- X. r. guayae Hellmayr, 1920
- X.. r. peruvianus Zimmer, JT, 1935
- X r. connectens Chapman, 1919
- X. r. purusianus Todd, 1925
- X.. r. chapadensis Zimmer, JT, 1935
- X. r. rutilans Temminck, 1821

== Description ==
The streaked xenops is about 12 to 13 cm (4.7 to 5.1 in) long and weighs 10 to 15 g (0.35 to 0.53 oz). Its bill is wedge-shaped, short, and thick. The sexes are alike. The nominate subspecies X. r. rutilans has somewhat variable plumage. Adults generally have a conspicuous buff supercilium and a pure white malar stripe on an otherwise brownish face with some darker and lighter highlights. Their crown is dark brown with rufous streaks. Their back is rufescent brown with faint paler rufous streaks, their rump and uppertail coverts plain chestnut-rufous, and their tail chestnut-rufous with a blackish inner web on one pair of feathers. Their wing coverts are rufescent-brown with darker inner webs, and their flight feathers are dark fuscous and all but the inner pair have a rufous tinge on their outer webs. Their throat and uppermost breast are whitish with darker mottling. The remainder of their underparts features broad buffy-white streaks with dark brownish edges set against a medium brown background; these streaks become narrower and less distinct toward the lower belly. Their iris is brown to dark brown, their maxilla dark brown to blackish, their mandible whitish to pinkish grey with a blackish tip, and their legs and feet grey to black. Juveniles differ from adults with less distinct streaking, less black on the tail, and a cloudy greyish throat.

The other 10 subspecies of the streaked xenops differ in varying degrees from the nominate, though much of the differences fall within the variability of the nominate's plumage. The differences tend to be in the intensity of the rufous of the upperparts, the size and exact color of the underparts' streaks, and the exact base color of the underparts.

== Distribution and habitat ==
The 11 subspecies of the streaked xenops are found thus:

- X r. septentrionalis: Costa Rica and western Panama's Chiriquí Province
- X.. r. Incomptus: Cerro Pirre in extreme eastern Panama
- X.. r. heterurus: Trinidad, northern Venezuela, east to the Paria Peninsula, and the Andes from Colombia south to Ecuador's Pastaza Province
- X. r. perijanus: Serranía del Perijá and the eastern Andes spanning the Colombia-Venezuela border
- X.. r. phelpsi: Sierra Nevada de Santa Marta in northern Colombia
- X. r. guayae: lowlands from Esmeraldas Province in northern Ecuador south to Peru's departments of Tumbes and Piura
- X. r. peruvianus: Andean foothills from Morona-Santiago Province in eastern Ecuador south to the Department of Puno in Peru
- X. r. connectens: eastern Andean foothills from La Paz Department in western Bolivia south to Tucumán Province in northwestern Argentina
- X. r. purusianus: from extreme eastern Peru and northeastern Bolivia east in central Brazil to the Rio Tapajós
- X. r. chapadensis: eastern Bolivia and southwestern Brazil
- X. r. rutilans: southeastern Brazil, north-central Paraguay, and northeastern Argentina

In the Andes and Central American mountains, the streaked xenops inhabits montane evergreen and deciduous forests, mostly at elevations between 700 and 2,400 m (2,300 and 7,900 ft). In Costa Rica, it occurs from 1,200 to 2,500 m (3,900 to 8,200 ft) and in Colombia from 1,400 to 2,800 m (4,600 to 9,200 ft). In the lowlands, it inhabits a wide variety of forest and woodland landscapes that range from semi-arid to humid. They include tropical deciduous and tropical lowland evergreen primary forest, and also secondary forest. It is found in the forest interior and at its edges. In Ecuador, it reaches 2,000 m (6,600 ft) in the west and spans from 800 to 2,000 m (2,600 to 6,600 ft) in the east. Much of its Brazilian range is at low elevation, but it reaches as high as 2,400 m (7,900 ft) in that country.

== Behavior ==
=== Movement ===
The streaked xenops is a year-round resident throughout its range.

=== Feeding ===
The diet of the streaked xenops consists of arthropods. The larvae of wood-boring beetles have been documented as an item in addition to adult arthropods. Single birds and pairs often join mixed-species foraging flocks. They feed in the forest understory at its edges and from the mid levels to its subcanopy in the interior. It climbs and hitches along slender branches and sometimes uses its tail as a brace, catching prey by gleaning, chiselling, and flaking bark and rotten wood. It has also been observed catching flying termites in mid-air.

=== Breeding ===
The streaked xenops' breeding season has not been determined in most of its range. In Costa Rica, it spans from January to May and in Trinidad, from February to May. It nests in a cavity, whether natural, excavated by a small woodpecker, or excavated itself, and adds a small amount of soft plant fiber to the bottom. Nests have been noted between 1.5 to 9 m (5 to 30 ft) above the ground. The clutch size is two or three eggs. The incubation period, time to fledging, and details of parental care are not known.

=== Xeno-CantoVocalization ===
The song of the streaked xenops is "an ascending and then descending, high-pitched series of 5–10 dry, squeaky 'swee' or 'zeet' notes, accelerating at [the] end". Its calls are "a high, piercing 'peet' or 'cheet' ".

== Status ==
The IUCN has assessed the streaked xenops as being of Least Concern. It has an extremely large range, and its estimated population of at least five million mature individuals is believed to be stable. No immediate threats have been identified. It is considered uncommon to fairly common across most of its range and occurs in many protected areas. It "[a]ppears fairly tolerant of habitat disturbance; survives in small and degraded forest fragments, although in some cases at lower densities".
