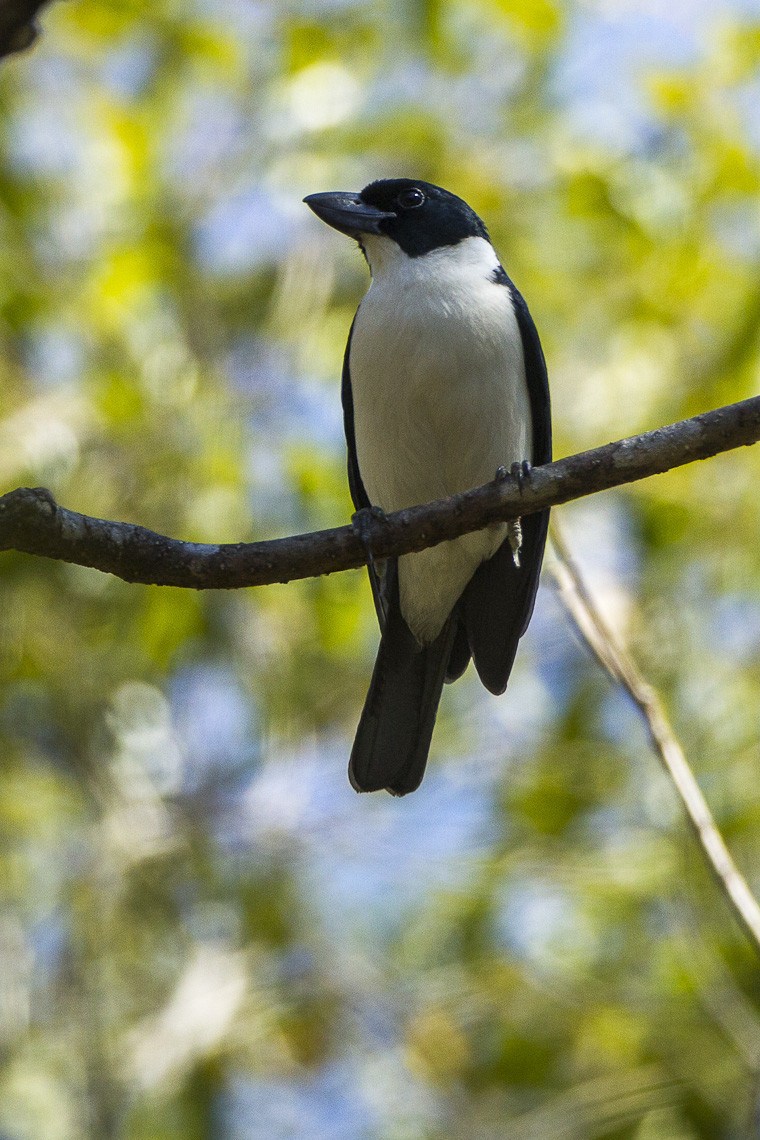

Conservation status
- Endangered (IUCN 3.1)

Scientific classification
- Kingdom: Animalia
- Phylum: Chordata
- Class: Aves
- Order: Passeriformes
- Family: Vangidae
- Genus: Xenopirostris
- Species: X. damii

Binomial name
- Xenopirostris damii Schlegel, 1865

= Van Dam's vanga =

Species of bird

Van Dam's vanga (Xenopirostris damii) is a species of bird in the family Vangidae. It is endemic to Madagascar.

Its natural habitat is subtropical or tropical dry forests. Males may be identified by their black hood whereas females have only a black cap.

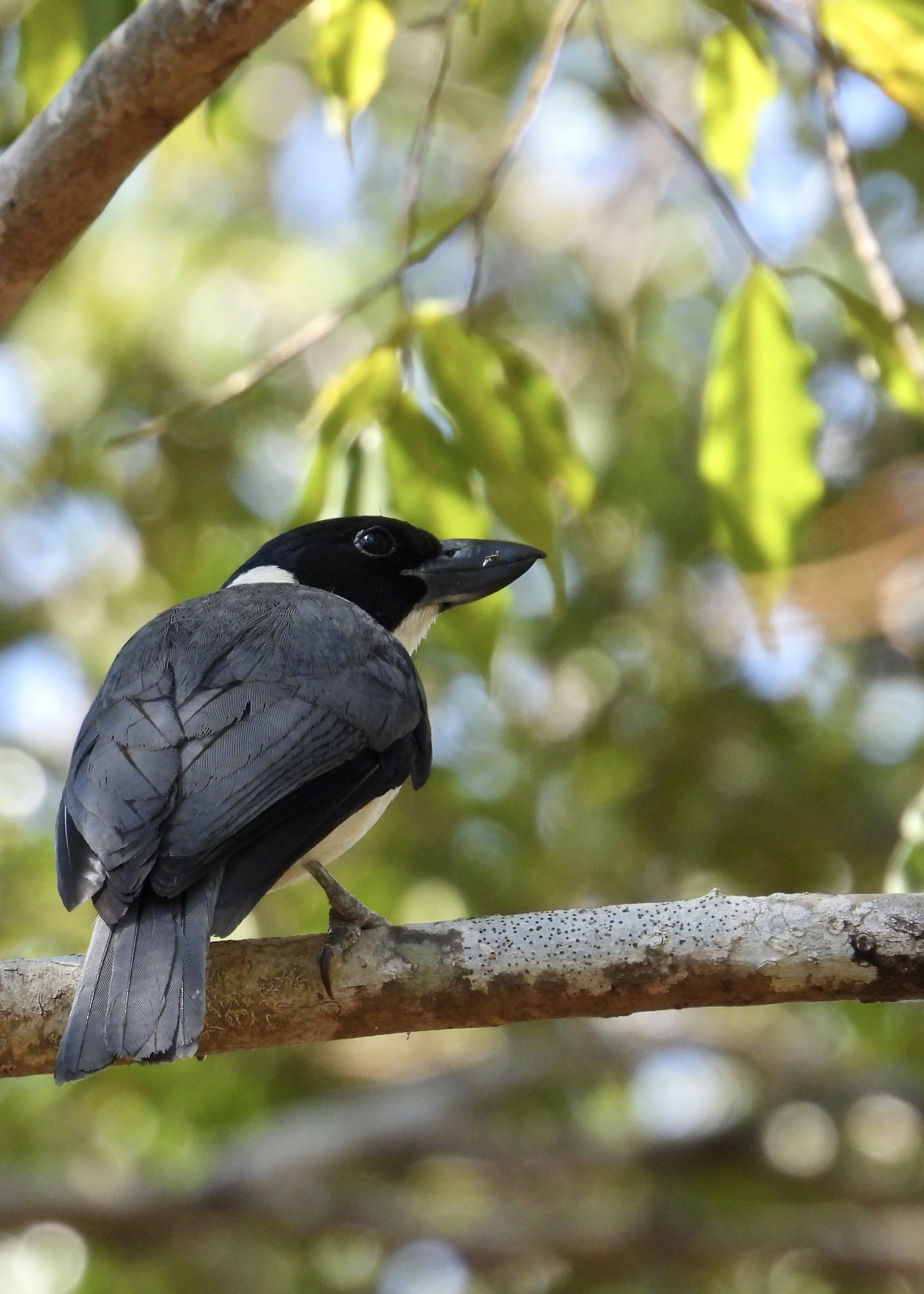
Van Dam's vanga in Ankarafantsika National Park

== Conservation status ==
At present, the species is endangered under the ICUN Species Red List. It has a decreasing population trend of between 1500 and 7000 individuals. The species inhabits a very small range, isolated to just two confirmed sites, one of which is the Ankarafantsika National Park. Its habitat is under increasing pressure from human encroachment and fire.
