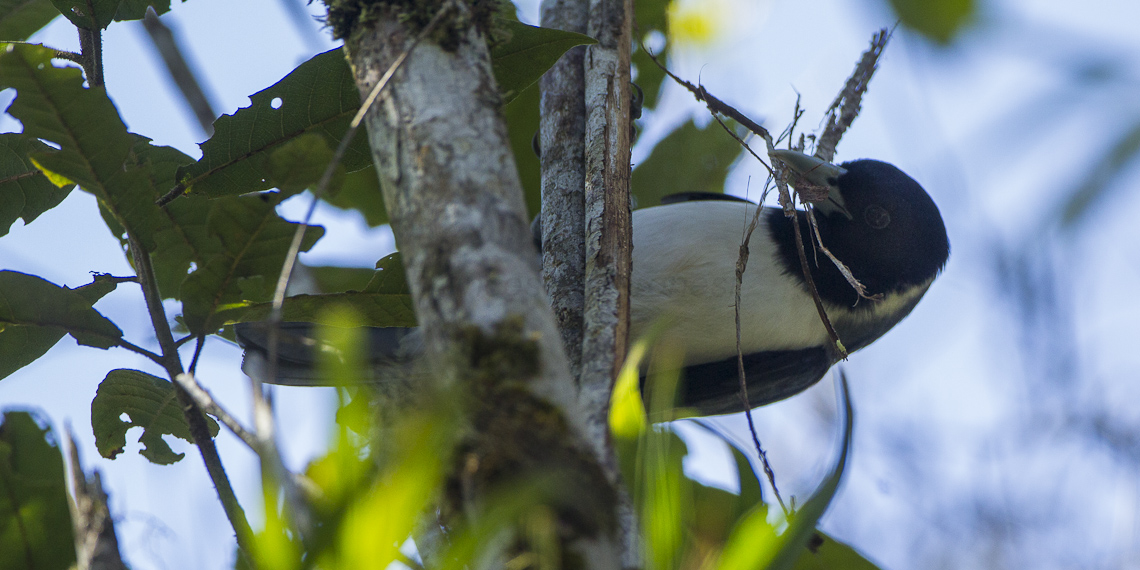

Conservation status
- Vulnerable (IUCN 3.1)

Scientific classification
- Kingdom: Animalia
- Phylum: Chordata
- Class: Aves
- Order: Passeriformes
- Family: Vangidae
- Genus: Xenopirostris
- Species: X. polleni

Binomial name
- Xenopirostris polleni (Schlegel, 1868)

= Pollen's vanga =

Species of bird

Pollen's vanga (Xenopirostris polleni) is a species of bird in the family Vangidae. It is endemic to eastern Madagascar. Its natural habitats are subtropical or tropical moist lowland forests and subtropical or tropical moist montane forests. It is threatened by habitat loss.

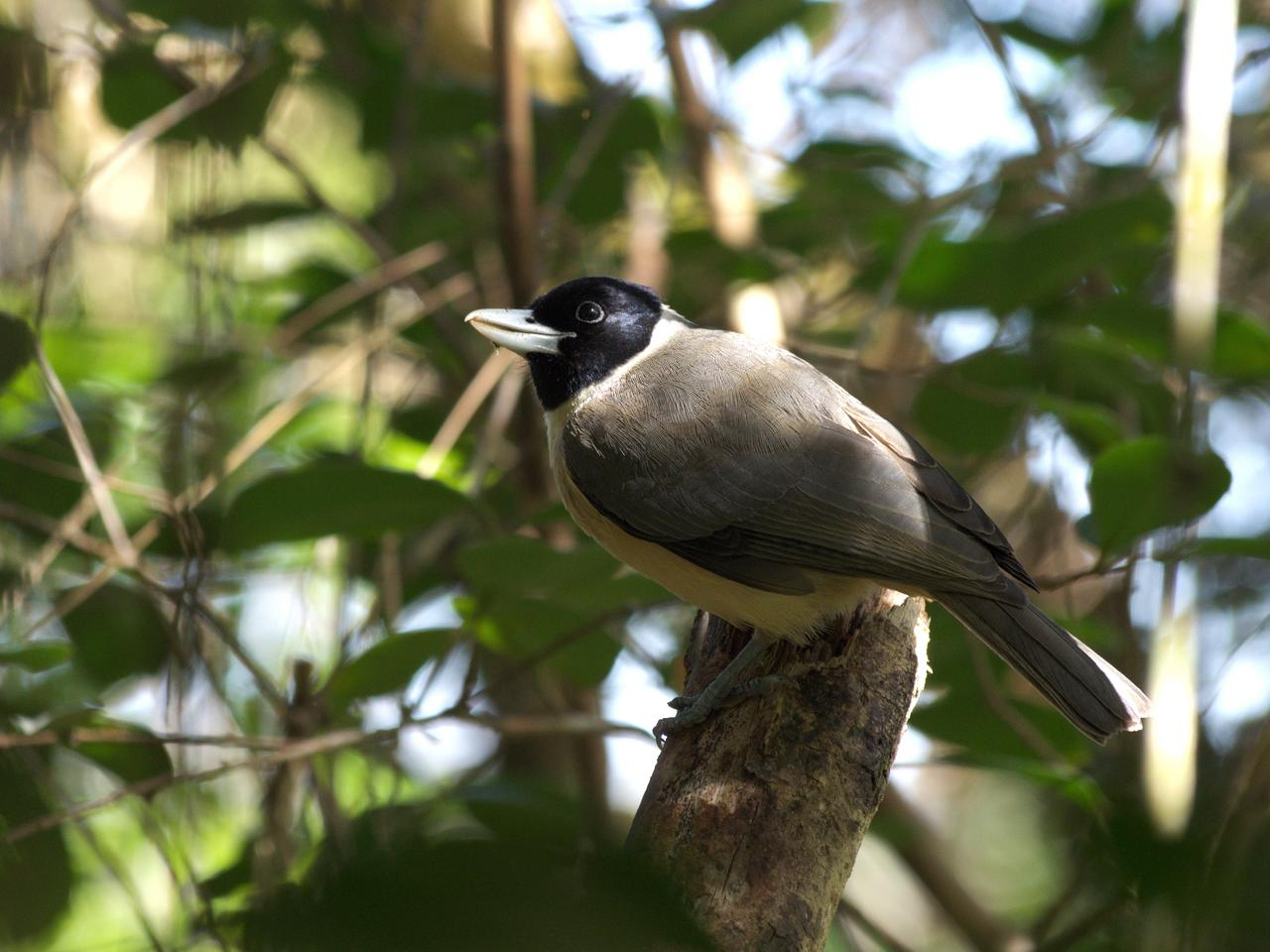
female
