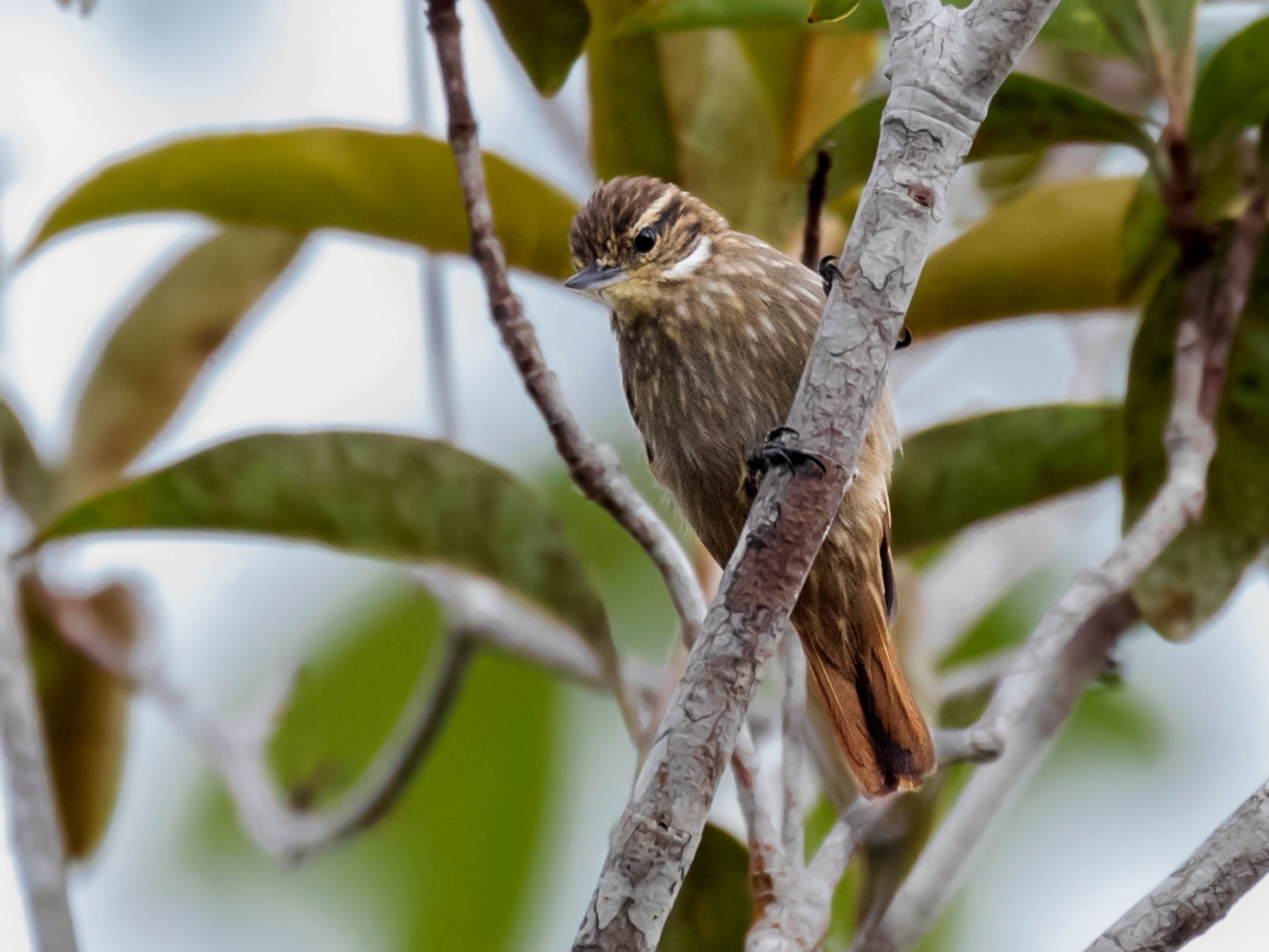

Conservation status
- Least Concern (IUCN 3.1)

Scientific classification
- Kingdom: Animalia
- Phylum: Chordata
- Class: Aves
- Order: Passeriformes
- Family: Furnariidae
- Genus: Xenops
- Species: X. tenuirostris

Binomial name
- Xenops tenuirostris Pelzeln, 1859

= Slender-billed xenops =

Species of bird

The slender-billed xenops (Xenops tenuirostris) is a species of bird in the Furnariinae subfamily of the ovenbird family Furnariidae. It is found in Bolivia, Brazil, Colombia, Ecuador, French Guiana, Guyana, Peru, Suriname, and Venezuela.

== Taxonomy and systematics ==
The slender-billed xenops has three subspecies, the nominate X. t. tenuirostris (Pelzeln, 1859), X. t. acutirostris (Chapman, 1923), and X. t. hellmayri (Todd, 1925).

== Description ==
The slender-billed xenops is 10 to 11.5 cm (3.9 to 4.5 in) long and weighs 9 to 11 g (0.32 to 0.39 oz). Its namesake bill is wedge-shaped, and longer and thinner than those of other xenops. The sexes are alike. Adults of the nominate subspecies have a blackish brown face with a dark brown crown that is spotted and streaked buff, a buffish white supercilium, and a pure white malar streak. Their back is rufescent brown with short, wide, elongated creamy buff spots on its upper part. Their rump and uppertail coverts are reddish rufous. Their tail's central and outermost pairs of feathers are rufous and the others mixed black and rufous; the black is visible in the field. Their wing coverts are dark brown with rufous edges and their flight feathers are blackish brown with a wide rufous band near their ends. Their chin and throat are pale buff with olive-brown streaks at the lower edge, their breast dull olive-brown with crisp pale buff streaks, their belly dull olive-brown with narrower buff streaks, and their undertail coverts dull olive-brown with pale buff streaks along their shafts. Their iris is brown to dark brown, their bill has a black or brownish maxilla and a black mandible with a lighter base, and their legs and feet are dark blue-gray to black.

Subspecies X. t. acutirostris has a darker back with larger streaks than the nominate, darker and more grayish olive underparts with wider whitish streaks, and a more slender bill. X. t. hellmayri more closely resembles the nominate, though its crown is slightly darker with more distinct streaks, its supercilium, neck, and throat are bright buff, and its underparts more brownish.

== Distribution and habitat ==
Subspecies X. t. acutirostris of the slender-billed xenops is found from western Guayana, southern Venezuela, and southeastern Colombia south through eastern Ecuador into northeastern Peru. X. t. hellmayri is found in Suriname and French Guiana. X. t. tenuirostris is found from southeastern Peru and northern Bolivia east into Brazil south of the Amazon River to Pará state. However, there is evidence that some populations may be mis-assigned: Birds in Venezuela do not closely resemble others of acutirostris, and those in Guyana might belong to hellmayri.

The slender-billed xenops inhabits humid lowland and flooded evergreen forest. In most of its range it occurs below 600 m (2,000 ft) but it reaches 900 m (3,000 ft) in Colombia and locally to 1,500 m (4,900 ft) in the Andean foothills.

== Behavior ==
=== Movement ===
The slender-billed xenops is a year-round resident throughout its range.

=== Feeding ===
The slender-billed xenops' diet is almost entirely arthropods. It usually forages as a member of mixed-species feeding flocks, and mostly in the forest's subcanopy and canopy. It hammers and gleans while hitching along branches.

=== Breeding ===
Nothing is known about the slender-billed xenops' breeding biology.

=== Vocalization ===
The slender-billed xenops' song is a series of four or five notes variously described as "tseep" and "tsip".

== Status ==
The IUCN has assessed the slender-billed xenops as being of Least Concern. It has a very large range, and though its population size is not known it is believed to be stable. No immediate threats have been identified. It is not well known, and thought to rare to locally uncommon. It occurs in several protected areas, especially in Peru.
