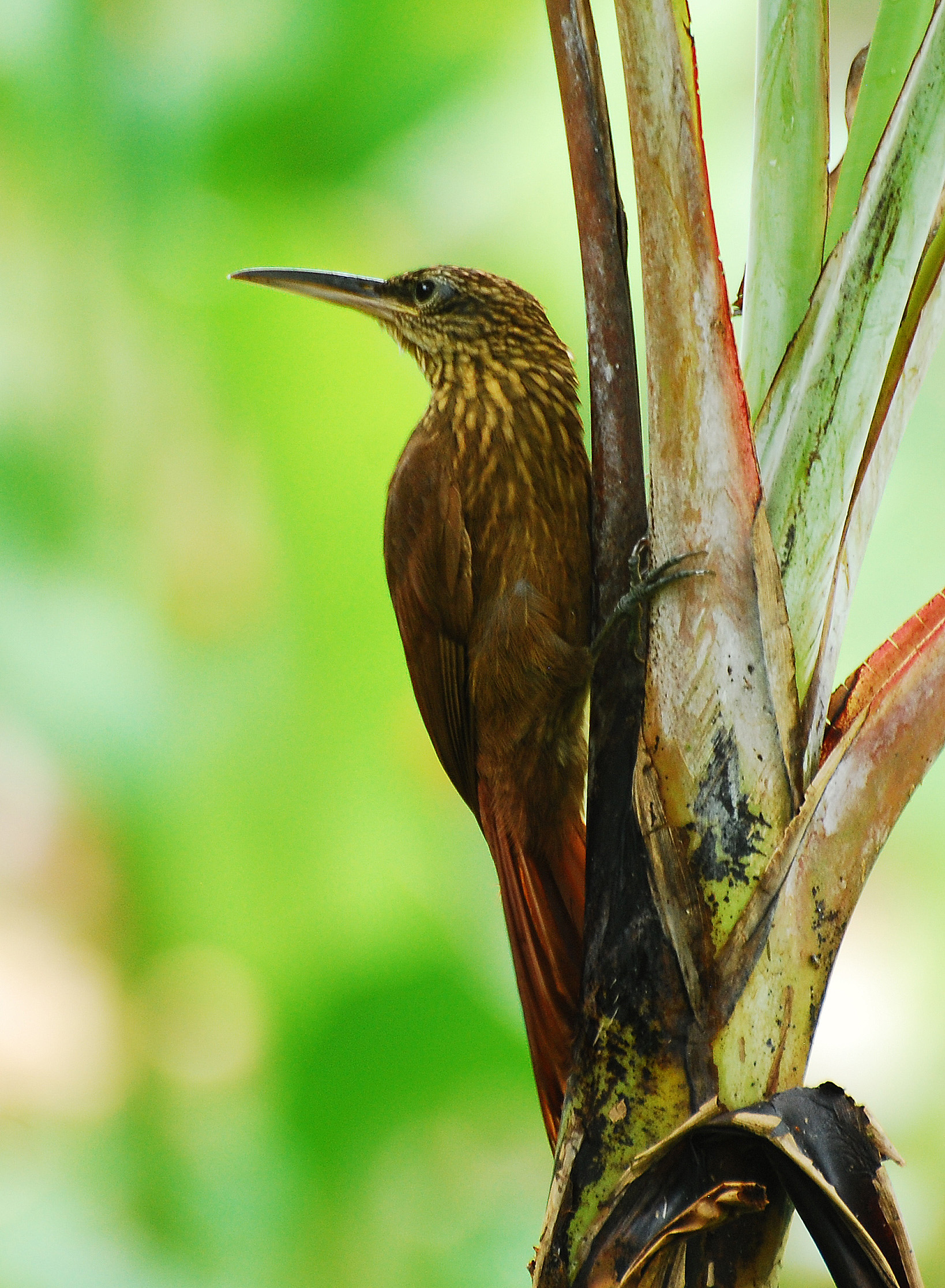

Conservation status
- Least Concern (IUCN 3.1)

Scientific classification
- Kingdom: Animalia
- Phylum: Chordata
- Class: Aves
- Order: Passeriformes
- Family: Furnariidae
- Genus: Xiphorhynchus
- Species: X. susurrans

Binomial name
- Xiphorhynchus susurrans (Jardine, 1847)

Subspecies
- See text

Synonyms
- Dendrocolaptes susurrans Jardine, 1847; Xiphorhynchus guttatus (partim)

= Cocoa woodcreeper =

Species of bird

The cocoa woodcreeper (Xiphorhynchus susurrans) is a species of bird in the subfamily Dendrocolaptinae of the ovenbird family Furnariidae. It is found in Colombia, Costa Rica, Guatemala, Honduras, Nicaragua, Panama, Trinidad and Tobago, and Venezuela.

== Taxonomy and systematics ==
The cocoa woodcreeper was formerly included in the buff-throated woodcreeper (X. guttatus) but since the 1990s has been recognized as a separate species. The two form a superspecies. Biogeography and molecular data suggest that the relationships among the subspecies of both deserve further study; some may be assigned to the wrong species or be species in their own right.

The cocoa woodcreeper has these eight subspecies that fall into two groups:

- "Lawrence's" or "nana" group
  - X. s. confinis (Bangs, 1903)
  - X. s. costaricensis (Ridgway, 1888)
  - X. s. marginatus Griscom, 1927
  - X. s. nana (Lawrence, 1863)
  - X. s. rosenbergi Bangs, 1910
- "Cocoa" or "susurrans" group
  - X. s. jardinei (Dalmas, 1900)
  - X. s. margaritae Phelps Sr. & Phelps Jr., 1949
  - X. s. susurrans (Jardine, 1847)

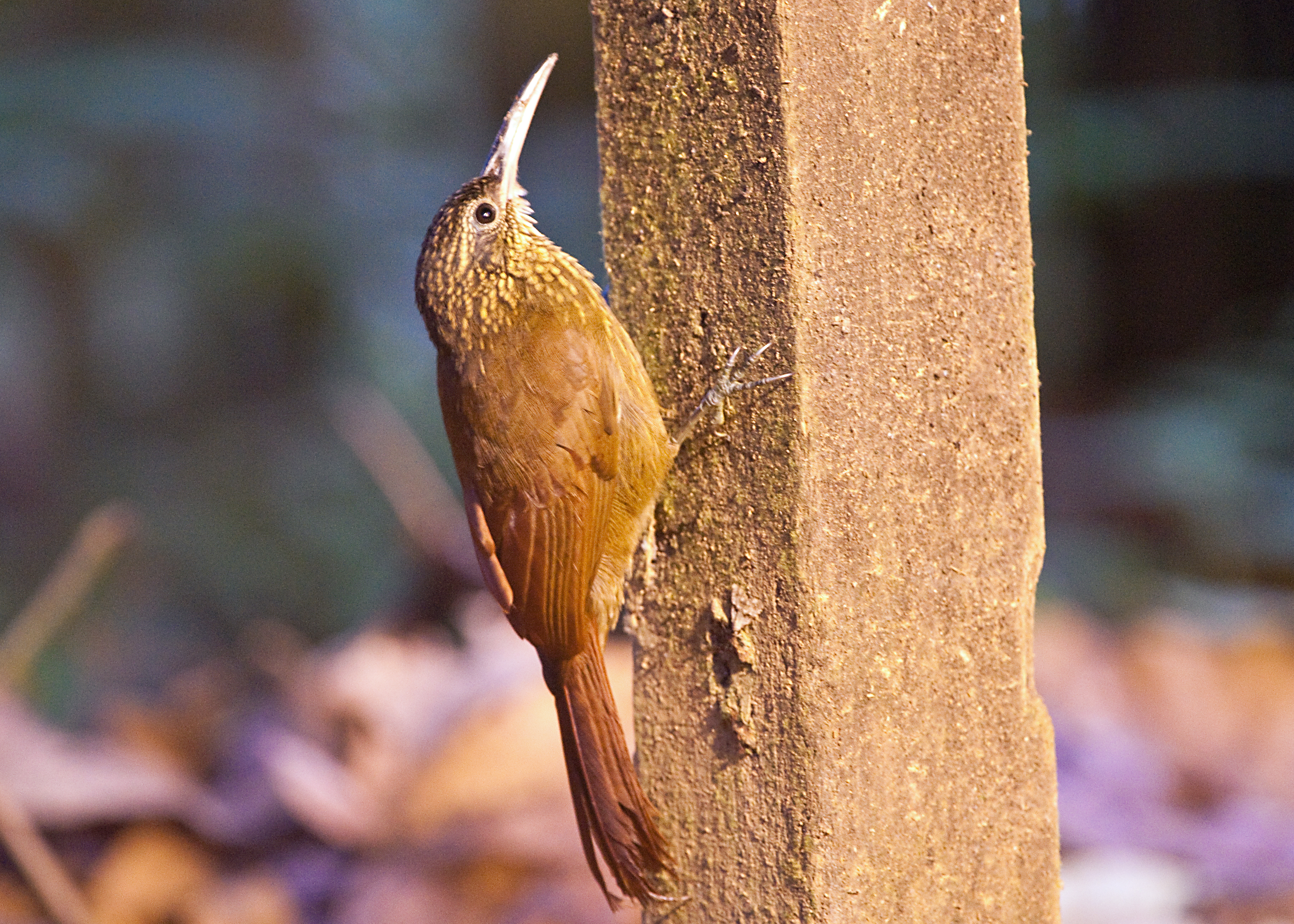
X. s. costaricensis at Cordillera de Talamanca, Costa Rica

== Description ==
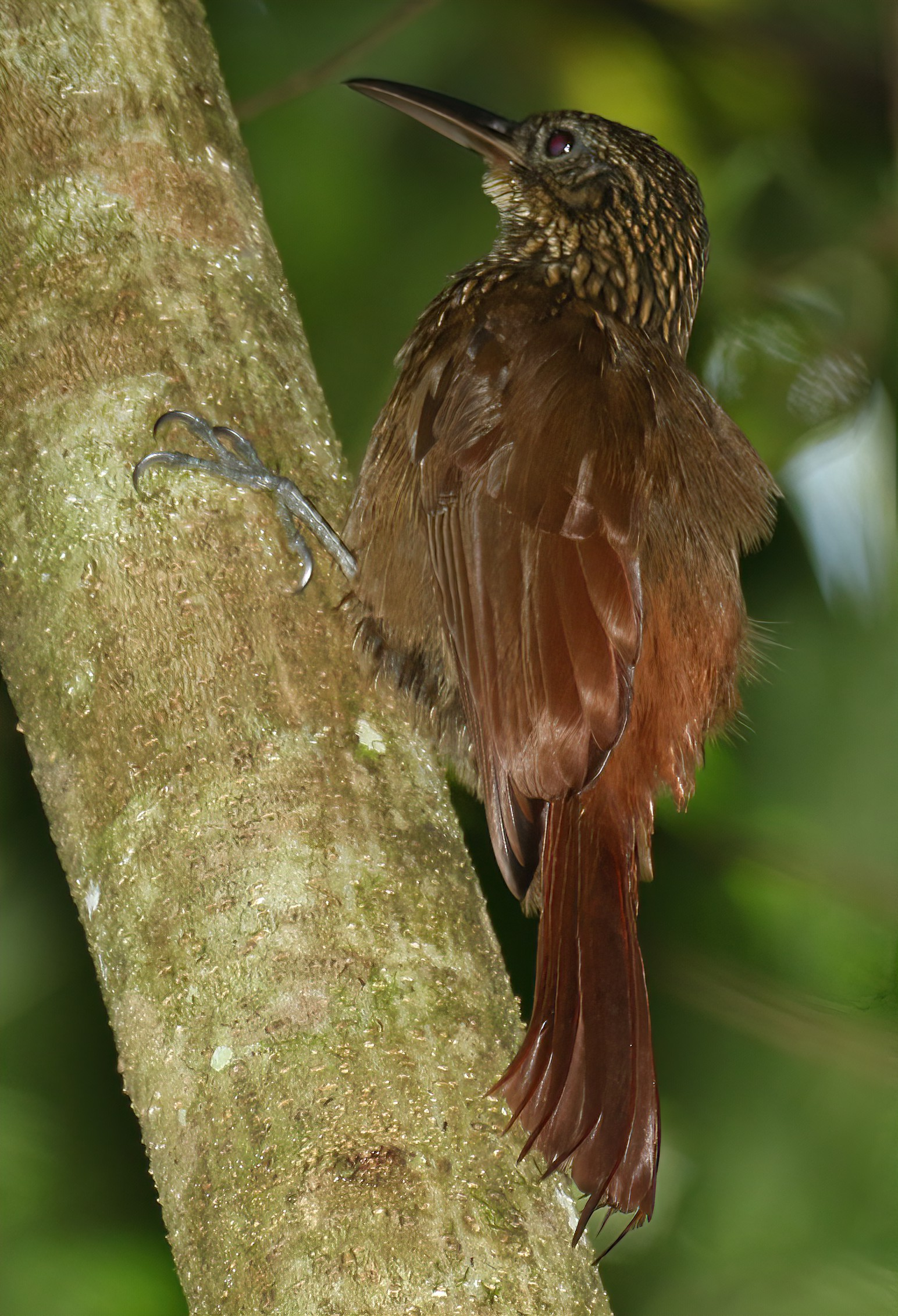
Cocoa_Woodcreeper at La Selva Lodge - Costa Rica - flash photo

The cocoa woodcreeper is 21 to 25.5 cm (8.3 to 10 in) long and weighs 43 to 58 g (1.5 to 2.0 oz). It is a medium-sized member of genus Xiphorhynchus, with a long, fairly heavy, slightly decurved bill. The sexes have the same plumage. Adults of the nominate subspecies X. s. susurrans have a mostly dusky face with buff streaks and a whitish supercilium. Their crown and nape are dark brown to blackish with longish buff spots that are streakier on the neck and nape. Their upper back and wing coverts are olive-brown to brown, with blackish-edged buff streaks on the back that narrow to nothing on the lower back. Their lower back, rump, tail, and flight feathers are rufous-chestnut, with dusky tips on the primaries. Their throat is whitish to pale buff with thin black scaling. Their breast, sides, and belly are reddish brown that becomes redder on the undertail coverts. Their underparts are grayish olive to buffy brown; their upper breast has dusky-edged buffy white spots that become thin streaks on the lower breast and disappear on the belly. Their undertail coverts are mostly unstreaked. Their underwing coverts are cinnamon. Their iris is dark brown, their bill mostly black with sometimes brownish gray in the middle of the mandible, and their legs and feet dark blue-gray, greenish gray, or yellowish gray. Juveniles are overall darker than adults and have a shorter and blacker bill, less bold spots on the crown, and wider streaks on the underparts.

The other subspecies of the cocoa woodcreeper differ from the nominate and each other thus:

- "Cocoa" or "susurrans" group (typically spotted underparts)
  - X. s. jardinei, more rufescent back, deeper buff throat and underparts
  - X. s. margaritae, spots rather than scaly pattern on the throat
- "Lawrence's" or "nana" group (typically streaked underparts)
  - X. s. nana, deep buff throat, bold streaks rather than spots on the breast and belly
  - X. s. confinis, more whitish throat, weaker but more extensive streaks than nana
  - X. s. costaricensis, darker and deeper reddish back and rump, darker and more olive underparts, reduced streaking compared to nana
  - X. s. marginatus, darker chestnut wings and tail, larger dusky tips on primaries, brighter buff throat, blackish edges on crown and nape feathers
  - X. s. rosenbergi, much like nana with wider and more boldly edged breast streaks

== Distribution and habitat ==
The subspecies of the cocoa woodcreeper are found thus:

- X. s. confinis, Caribbean slope of eastern Guatemala and northern Honduras
- X. s. costaricensis, Caribbean and Pacific slopes from southeastern Honduras through Nicaragua and Costa Rica into western Panama
- X. s. marginatus, Pacific slope of central Panama
- X. s. nana, Caribbean and Pacific slopes of eastern Panama, much of northern Colombia, and northern and western Venezuela
- X. s. rosenbergi, upper Cauca Valley in Colombia's Valle del Cauca Department
- X. s. jardinei, northeastern Venezuela
- X. s. margaritae, Isla Margarita off the Venezuelan coast
- X. s. susurrans, Trinidad and Tobago, with one mainland record in Venezuela

The cocoa woodcreeper mostly inhabits humid evergreen forest. It favors landscapes like gallery forest, deciduous woodland, and the edges of primary forest and mature secondary forest. It occurs less in the interior of primary forest, in young secondary forest, in plantations, and in open areas with scattered trees. It occurs in magroves along some coasts, and on Isla Margarita inhabits arid scrub. In elevation it mostly is found below 900 m (3,000 ft) but reaches 1,000 m (3,300 ft) in northern Central America, 1,600 m (5,200 ft) in Colombia, and occasionally 2,400 m (7,900 ft) in Venezuela.

== Behavior ==
=== Movement ===
The cocoa woodcreeper is a year-round resident throughout its range.

=== Feeding ===
The cocoa woodcreeper's diet is mostly arthropods but also occasionally includes small vertebrates such as frogs and lizards. It usually forages by itself but does join mixed-species feeding flocks and follows army ant swarms. With flocks it usually forages in the mid-level of the forest; when attending ants it forages much nearer the ground. Away from ants it hitches up trunks, often in a spiral, and along branches, often on their underside. Most prey is taken by gleaning from bark crevices and by probing dead leaves, epiphytes, moss clumps, and knotholes. It sometimes pecks at rotting wood or flakes off bark. When attending ants, it gleans and sometimes makes sallies to the ground.

=== Breeding ===
The cocoa woodcreeper's breeding season varies somewhat geographically, but generally is within the northern spring and summer of May to August. It nests primarily in natural cavities but sometimes in human structures. It adds bits of bark, wood chips, and softer plant material to the cavity. The limited amount of observations show a clutch size is two eggs and incubation period of 19 to 20 days. The time to fledging is at least 17 days from hatch. It appears that only the female incubates eggs and cares for nestlings.

=== Vocalization ===
The cocoa woodcreeper is quite vocal; during the breeding seasons it sings for long periods at dawn and dusk and sometimes during much of the day. Its song is "a loud series of 7-20 (often 7-8) clear but upward-inflected whistles...either be on the same pitch or beginning fast and rising slightly, before fading and descending, e.g., ki, ki, kuee, kuee, whe, whew, whew, whew, whew." It makes a "long call" of "steady rolling laughter on one pitch, but rising in volume toward middle and end, weet-weet-WEET-WEET-WEET-WEET-WEET-WEET-WEET-WEET. Other calls include "cheer", "pyewl", "chu", and "choe".

== Status ==
The IUCN has assessed the cocoa woodcreeper as being of Least Concern. It has a very large range and an estimated population of at least 500,000 mature individuals. The latter, however, is believed to be decreasing. No immediate threats have been identified. It is considered fairly common to common in most of its range but uncommon to rare and local at higher elevations and in northern Central America. "At many sites it is reported to have a preference for forest edge and second growth, which indicates a relatively low sensitivity to human disturbance [but] is dependent, however, upon the presence of at least patchy forest."
