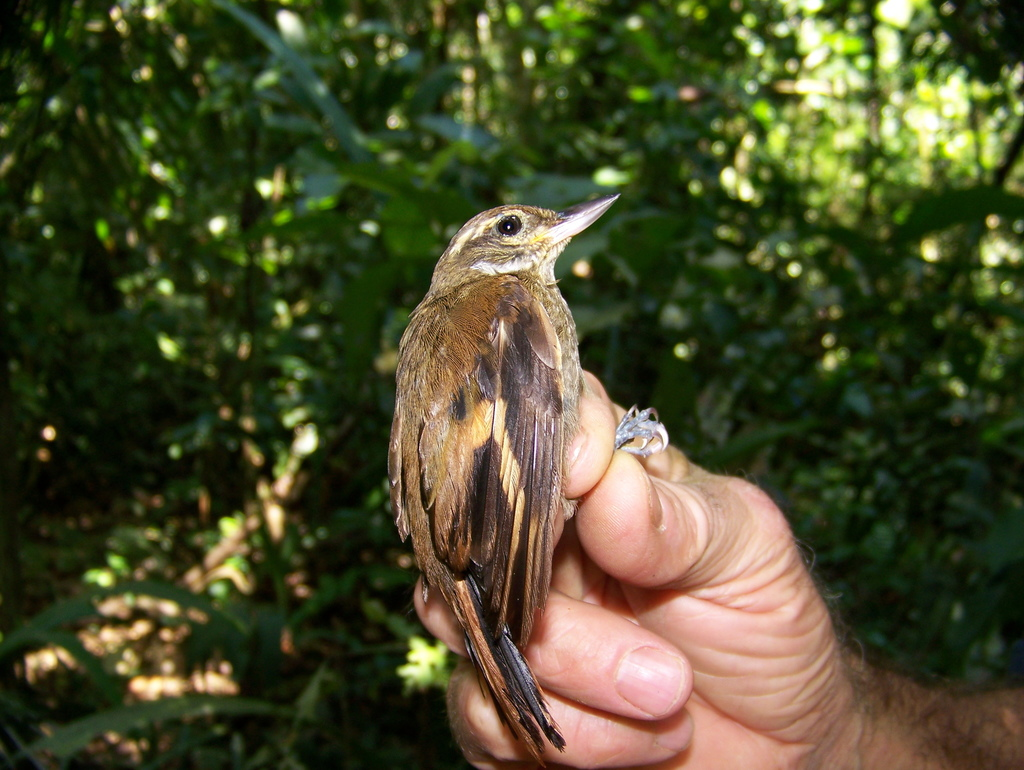
- In Ecuador

Conservation status
- Least Concern (IUCN 3.1)

Scientific classification
- Kingdom: Animalia
- Phylum: Chordata
- Class: Aves
- Order: Passeriformes
- Family: Furnariidae
- Genus: Xenops
- Species: X. genibarbis

Binomial name
- Xenops genibarbis Illiger, 1811

= Amazonian plain xenops =

Species of bird

The Amazonian plain xenops (Xenops genibarbis) is a passerine bird in the Furnariinae subfamily of the ovenbird family Furnariidae. It is found in every mainland South American country except Argentina, Chile, Paraguay, and Uruguay.

== Taxonomy and systematics ==
The Amazonian plain xenops was formally described in 1811 by the German zoologist Johann Illiger based on a specimen collected near Cametá in northeastern Brazil. He coined the binomial name Xenops genibarbis where the specific epithet combines Latin gena meaning "cheek" with barba meaning "beard".

What are now the five subspecies of the Amazonian plain xenops were formerly included in the "plain xenops" (X. minutus). In 2016 BirdLife International's Handbook of the Birds of the World (HBW) separated X. genibarbis, with 10 subspecies, from X. minutus and confusingly called the new species "plain xenops". HBW renamed X. minutus the "white-throated xenops". The International Ornithological Committee (IOC) recognized the split in July 2023 and kept the HBW English names.

A study published in 2020 described differences in plumage, vocalizations and DNA among the subspecies of X. genibabis. Based on it and other studies, in August 2024 the IOC further split X. genibarbis into two species, the Amazonian plain xenops and the northern plain xenops (X. mexicanus). The South American Classification Committee of the American Ornithological Society (SACC) adopted the three-way split with the IOC English names in September 2024. The Clements taxonomy adopted the same split and English names in October 2024. However, as of December 2024 HBW retains the earlier names of "white-throated xenops" for X. minutus and "plain xenops", with 10 subspecies, for X. genibarbis. As of August 2024 the North American Classification Committee of the American Ornithological Society has not adopted the splits and retains the name "plain xenops" for X. minutus sensu lato.

The five subspecies of the Amazonian plain xenops are:

- X. g. remoratus Zimmer, JT, 1935
- X. g. ruficaudus (Vieillot, 1816)
- X. g. obsoletus Zimmer, JT, 1924
- X. g. genibarbis Illiger, 1811
- X. g. alagoanus Pinto, 1954

== Description ==
The Amazonian plain xenops has a wedge-shaped, fairly stubby, and slightly upturned bill. The sexes are alike. Adults of the nominate subspecies X. g. genibarbis have a conspicuous buff or whitish supercilium and a wide pure white malar stripe. Their upperparts are dull brown to rufous brown and unstreaked; their crown is darker and lightly streaked. Their tail is cinnamon with much black. Their wings are also cinnamon, with a wide ochraceous band on the flight feathers. Their throat is pale with olivaceous edges to the feathers. The rest of their underparts are plain dull grayish brown with some light buff spotting on the foreneck and breast. Their iris is dark brown, their maxilla dull black, their mandible dull grayish white with a dark gray tip, and their legs and feet bluish gray. The minimal streaking and the wide malar stripe set this species apart from other xenops.

The other subspecies of the Amazonian plain xenops differ from the nominate and each other thus:

- X. g. ruficaudus, darker and buff-streaked crown, more olivaceous underparts, foreneck and breast more spotted
- X. g. obsoletus, similar to ruficaudus with more olivaceous upperparts and foreneck and breast less spotted
- X. g. remoratus, little or no crown streaking, duller above and below, ill-defined breast markings
- X. g. alagoanus, very similar to nominate without streaks on crown

== Distribution and habitat ==
The Amazonian plain xenops is a bird of the Orinoco and Amazon basins. The subspecies are distributed thus:

- X. g. remoratus, eastern Colombia, southwestern Venezuela along the upper Orinoco, and northwestern Brazil north of the Amazon and east to the Rio Negro
- X. g. ruficaudus, eastern Colombia, southern and eastern Venezuela, the Guianas, and northern Brazil north of the Amazon and east of the Rio Negro
- X. g. obsoletus, eastern Ecuador, eastern Peru, northern Bolivia, and western Brazil south of the Amazon and east to the Rio Madeira
- X. g. genibarbis, central Brazil south of the Amazon from the Rio Madeira east to Piauí state and south to Mato Grosso and Goiás states
- X. g. alagoanus, northeastern Brazil between Paraíba and Alagoas states

The Amazonian plain xenops inhabits the interior and edges of a variety of forested landscapes including terra firme and várzea forests in the tropical lowlands, semideciduous forest, and mature secondary forest. In elevation it occurs up to 2,000 m (6,600 ft) in Colombia. It reaches 2,200 m (7,200 ft) in Venezuela but is mostly found below 1,500 m (4,900 ft). In Ecuador it is mostly below 900 m (3,000 ft) but reaches 1,300 m (4,300 ft). It occurs up to 1,500 m (4,900 ft) in Brazil, to 1,400 m (4,600 ft) in Peru, and 1,300 m (4,300 ft) in Bolivia.

== Behavior ==
=== Movement ===
The Amazonian plain xenops is a year-round resident throughout its range.

=== Feeding ===
The Amazonian plain xenops' diet is almost entirely arthropods, both adult and larval. It has been recorded eating termites, Hymenoptera like ants and bees, beetles, katydids, millipedes, and spiders. It typically forages from the forest understory to its mid level but does ascend to the canopy. It often joins mixed-species foraging flocks. It captures prey by gleaning, hammering, chiseling, and prying with its upturned bill. It does much of its foraging on fairly thin dead branches, often rotten ones and those that have fallen into the understory, and also feeds along vines.

=== Breeding ===
The Amazonian plain xenops' breeding season includes February and July to November in central Brazil. Nothing else is known about the species' breeding biology but it is believed to be similar to that of its former conspecific northern plain xenops, which see here.

=== Vocalization ===
The song of the Amazonian plain xenops has some geographical variation. It has been variously described as "a very fast chattering trill, accelerating then slowing at end, dit dit dit-dit 'dt'd'd'd'd'd'd'd'd'a'a'a" (Colombia) and "a slightly descending, slightly accelerating, series of high, lisping, rising notes, usually a pause before the last note: wisst wisst-wisst-wisst-wisst wisst" (Peru). Others renditions are "a mostly ascending series of notes, e.g., 'ts-tsi-tsi-tsi-tsi-tsi' " (Ecuador), and an "extr. high, hurried series of 5-10 x 'seep---' " (Brazil). Descriptions of its call also varies: a "short emphatic high-pitched speek! or week! note, uttered singly or several times with intervals of typically 1‒2 s" and "a sharp 'peeyk' ".

== Status ==
The IUCN follows HBW taxonomy and so has assessed the Amazonian plain xenops and northern plain xenops as a single species. The "plain xenops" has a very large range, but its population size is not known and is believed to be decreasing. No immediate threats have been identified It is considered "common" in Colombia, "fairly common" in Venezuela, "widespread" in Ecuador, and "widespread and fairly common" in Peru. It occurs in protected areas in most countries in its range. "Though the Amazonian Plain-Xenops appears to be somewhat tolerant of human disturbances, disappearance from disturbed forests has also been recorded."
