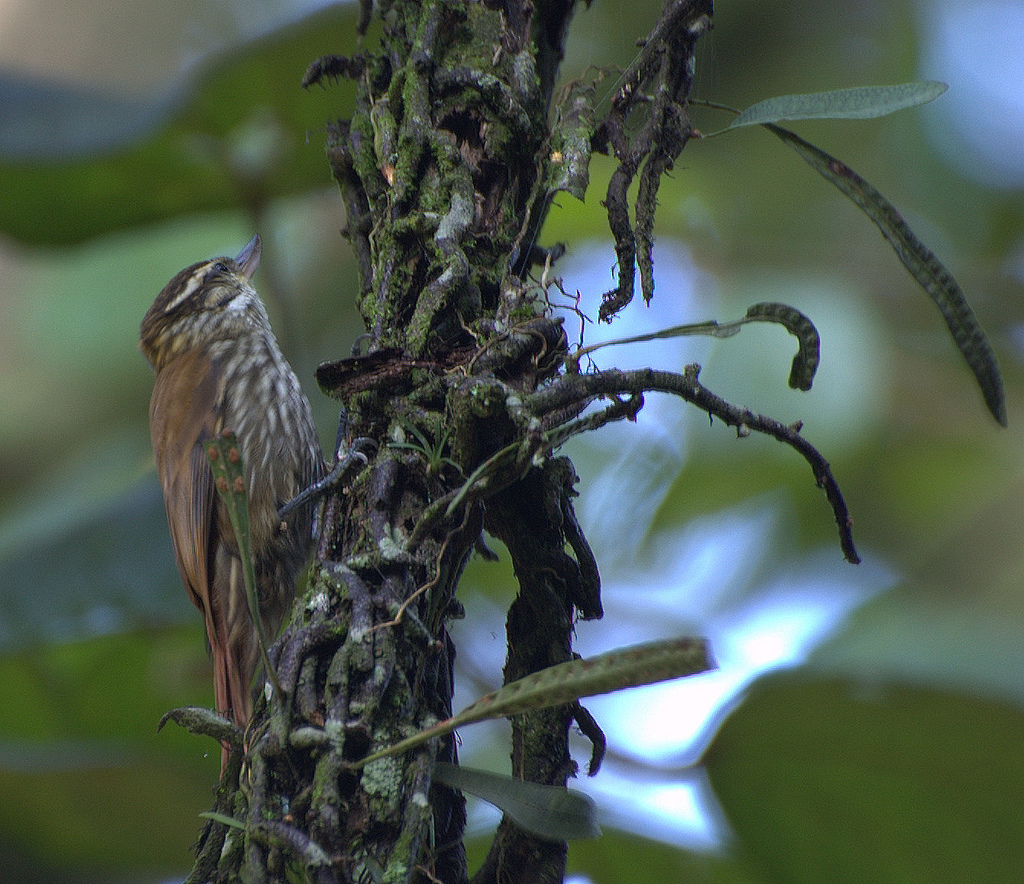
- Streaked xenops (Xenops rutilans)

Scientific classification
- Kingdom: Animalia
- Phylum: Chordata
- Class: Aves
- Order: Passeriformes
- Family: Furnariidae
- Genus: Xenops; Illiger, 1811

Type species
- Xenops genibarbis Illiger, 1811

Species
- See text.

= Xenops =

Genus of birds

Xenops is a genus in the bird family Furnariidae, the ovenbirds. The genus comprises four species of xenops, all of which are found in Mexico, Central America and South America, particularly in tropical rain forests.

They are small birds with a longish tail, a laterally flattened bill with an upturned tip (except in the slender-billed xenops), brown back and buff or rufous wing stripe. They forage for insects on bark, rotting stumps or bare twigs, moving mechanically in all directions on the trunk like a woodcreeper, but without using the tail as a prop.

Together with the distinct great xenops (Megaxenops parnaguae), this genus forms the tribe Xenopini, which based on some recent studies belongs in the woodcreeper and xenops subfamily Dendrocolaptinae, while others have found them to be part of the "traditional" ovenbirds. A study from 2013 found that they should be a family distinct from both.

== Species ==
Formerly, the rufous-tailed xenops was placed in this genus, but it has been moved to the monotypic Microxenops. The following five species remain in the genus Xenops:

Image	Scientific name	Common name	Distribution
	Xenops tenuirostris	Slender-billed xenops	Bolivia, Brazil, Colombia, Ecuador, French Guiana, Guyana, Peru, Suriname, and Venezuela
	Xenops mexicanus	Northern plain xenops	southern Mexico through Panama to northern Colombia, northwest Venezuela and western Ecuador
	Xenops genibarbis	Amazonian plain xenops	east Colombia and Venezuela (except northwest) through Amazonia and the Guianas south to north Bolivia; also northeast Brazil
	Xenops minutus	Atlantic plain xenops	east Brazil
	Xenops rutilans	Streaked xenops	from Costa Rica and Trinidad south to Bolivia and northern Argentina
