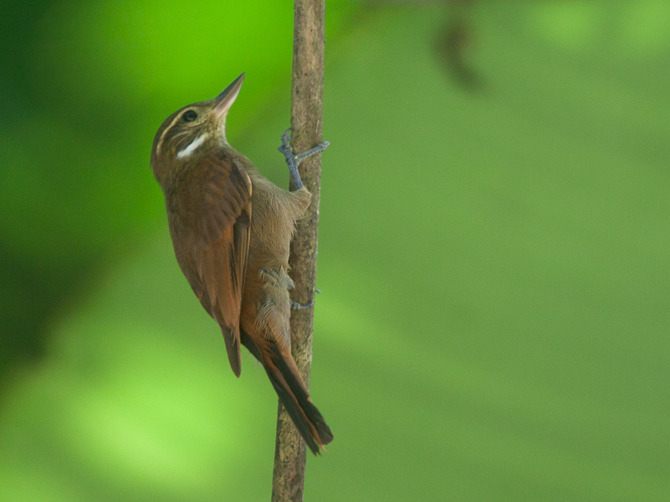
- In Panama

Scientific classification
- Kingdom: Animalia
- Phylum: Chordata
- Class: Aves
- Order: Passeriformes
- Family: Furnariidae
- Genus: Xenops
- Species: X. mexicanus

Binomial name
- Xenops mexicanus Sclater, 1857

= Northern plain xenops =

Species of bird

The northern plain xenops (Xenops mexicanus) is a passerine bird in the subfamily Furnariinae of the family Furnariidae. It is found from southern Mexico through Panama to northern Colombia, in northwestern Venezuela, and through and western Ecuador into Peru.

== Taxonomy and systematics ==
The northern plain xenops was formally described in 1857 by the English zoologist Philip Sclater based on specimens collected near Córdoba in southern Mexico by Auguste Sallé. Sclater coined the binomial name Xenops mexicanus. The northern plain xenops is one of five species placed in the genus Xenops that was introduced in 1811 by Johann Illiger.

What are now the five subspecies of the northern plain xenops were formerly included in the "plain xenops" (X. minutus). In 2016 BirdLife International's Handbook of the Birds of the World (HBW) separated X. genibarbis, with 10 subspecies, from X. minutus and confusingly called the new species "plain xenops". HBW renamed X. minutus the "white-throated xenops". The International Ornithological Committee (IOC) recognized the split in July 2023 and kept the HBW English names.

A study published in 2020 described differences in plumage, vocalizations and DNA among the subspecies of X. genibabis. Based on it and other studies, in August 2024 the IOC further split X. genibarbis into two species, the northern plain xenops and the Amazonian plain xenops (which retained X. genibarbis). The South American Classification Committee of the American Ornithological Society (SACC) adopted the three-way split with the IOC English names in September 2024. The Clements taxonomy adopted the same split and English names in October 2024. However, as of December 2024 HBW retains the earlier names of "white-throated xenops" for X. minutus and "plain xenops", with 10 subspecies, for X. genibarbis. As of August 2024 the North American Classification Committee of the American Ornithological Society has not adopted the splits and retains the name "plain xenops" for X. minutus sensu lato.

The five subspecies of the northern plain xenops are:

- Xenops mexicanus mexicanus Sclater, PL, 1857
- Xenops mexicanus ridgwayi Hartert, EJO & Goodson, 1917
- Xenops mexicanus littoralis Sclater, PL, 1862
- Xenops mexicanus olivaceus Aveledo & Pons, 1952
- Xenops mexicanus neglectus Todd, 1913

== Description ==
The northern plain xenops is 11 to 13 cm (4.3 to 5.1 in) long. Eight individuals weighed 10.4 to 12.8 g (0.37 to 0.45 oz). The species has a wedge-shaped, fairly stubby, and slightly upturned bill. The sexes are alike. Adults of the nominate subspecies X. m. mexicanus have a conspicuous buff or whitish supercilium and a wide white malar stripe. Their upperparts are dull brown to rufous brown and unstreaked; their crown is darker and lightly streaked. Their tail is cinnamon with much black. Their wings are also cinnamon, with a wide tawny or ochraceous band on the flight feathers. Their throat is pale with little or no streaking. The rest of their underparts are plain dull grayish brown with some light buff spotting on the foreneck and breast. Their iris is dark brown, their maxilla dull black, their mandible dull grayish white with a dark gray tip, and their legs and feet bluish gray.

The other subspecies of the northern plain xenops differ from the nominate and each other thus:

- X. g. ridgwayi: much less rufous overall than nominate, with whiter throat and more rufous to brownish underparts
- X. g. littoralis: dusky brown crown with minimal streaks, yellowish throat, more olivaceous underparts, rufous wings and tail
- X. g. neglectus: much like littoralis but slightly paler than it and nominate, with cinnamon wings and tail; less rufous overall than nominate
- X. g. olivaceus: very like neglectus but with more olive (less grayish) underparts

== Distribution and habitat ==
The subspecies of the northern plain xenops are found thus:

- X. g. mexicanus: from Veracruz and Oaxaca in southern Mexico south through Belize and Guatemala into Honduras
- X. g. ridgwayi: from Nicaragua south through Costa Rica into central Panama
- X. g. littoralis: from Panama's Darién Province south through western Colombia and western Ecuador into extreme northwestern Peru's Tumbes Department, and northern Colombia east to the valleys of the Cauca and Magdalena rivers
- X. g. neglectus: northeastern Colombia as far south as Cundinamarca Department and into northwestern Venezuela as far as Miranda
- X. g. olivaceus: Serranía del Perijá that straddles the Colombia-Venezuela border

The northern plain xenops inhabits the interior and edges of tropical lowland forest, semideciduous forest, and mature secondary forest. In elevation it ranges from sea level to 1,300 m (4,300 ft) in northern Central America, to 1,500 m (4,900 ft) in Costa Rica, to 2,000 m (6,600 ft) in Colombia, to 2,200 m (7,200 ft) but mostly below to 1,500 m (4,900 ft) in Venezuela, and to 900 m (3,000 ft) in Ecuador.

== Behavior ==
=== Movement ===
The northern plain xenops is a year-round resident throughout its range.

=== Feeding ===
The northern plain xenops' diet is almost entirely arthropods, both adult and larval. It has been recorded eating termites, Hymenoptera like ants and bees, beetles, katydids, millipedes, and spiders. It typically forages from the forest understory to its mid level but does ascend to the canopy. It often joins mixed-species foraging flocks. It captures prey by gleaning, hammering, chiseling, and prying with its upturned bill. It does much of its foraging on fairly thin dead branches, often rotten ones and those that have fallen into the understory, and also feeds along vines.

=== Breeding ===
Most of what is known about the northern plain xenops' breeding biology is from Skutch's Life Histories of Central American Birds. In Costa Rica and Panama it breeds between December and June. Both members of a pair excavate a cavity in rotten wood, usually 3 to 10 m (10 to 30 ft) above ground, and line it with soft plant material. They also use cavities excavated by small woodpeckers. The clutch size is two eggs and sometimes two broods are raised in a year. The incubation period is 15 to 17 days and fledging occurs 13 to 14 days after hatch. Both parents incubate the clutch and provision the nestlings.

=== Vocalization ===
The northern plan xenops' song is a "series of short staccato high-pitched notes that has a duration of about 1.0‒1.5 s". Its call is a "short emphatic high-pitched spik! note, uttered singly or several times with intervals of typically 1‒2 s."

== Status ==
The IUCN follows HBW taxonomy and so has assessed the northern plain xenops and Amazonian plain xenops as a single species. The "plain xenops" has a very large range, but its population size is not known and is believed to be decreasing. No immediate threats have been identified. It is considered "fairly common" in northern Central America, "fairly common" in most of Costa Rica but rare in the far northwest, "common" in Colombia, "fairly common" in Venezuela, and "widespread" in Ecuador. "Though the Northern Plain-Xenops appears to be somewhat tolerant of human disturbances, disappearance from disturbed forests has also been recorded."
