= Frédéric de Lafresnaye =

French ornithologist (1783–1861)

Frédéric de Lafresnaye 3^{e} baron de La Fresnaye
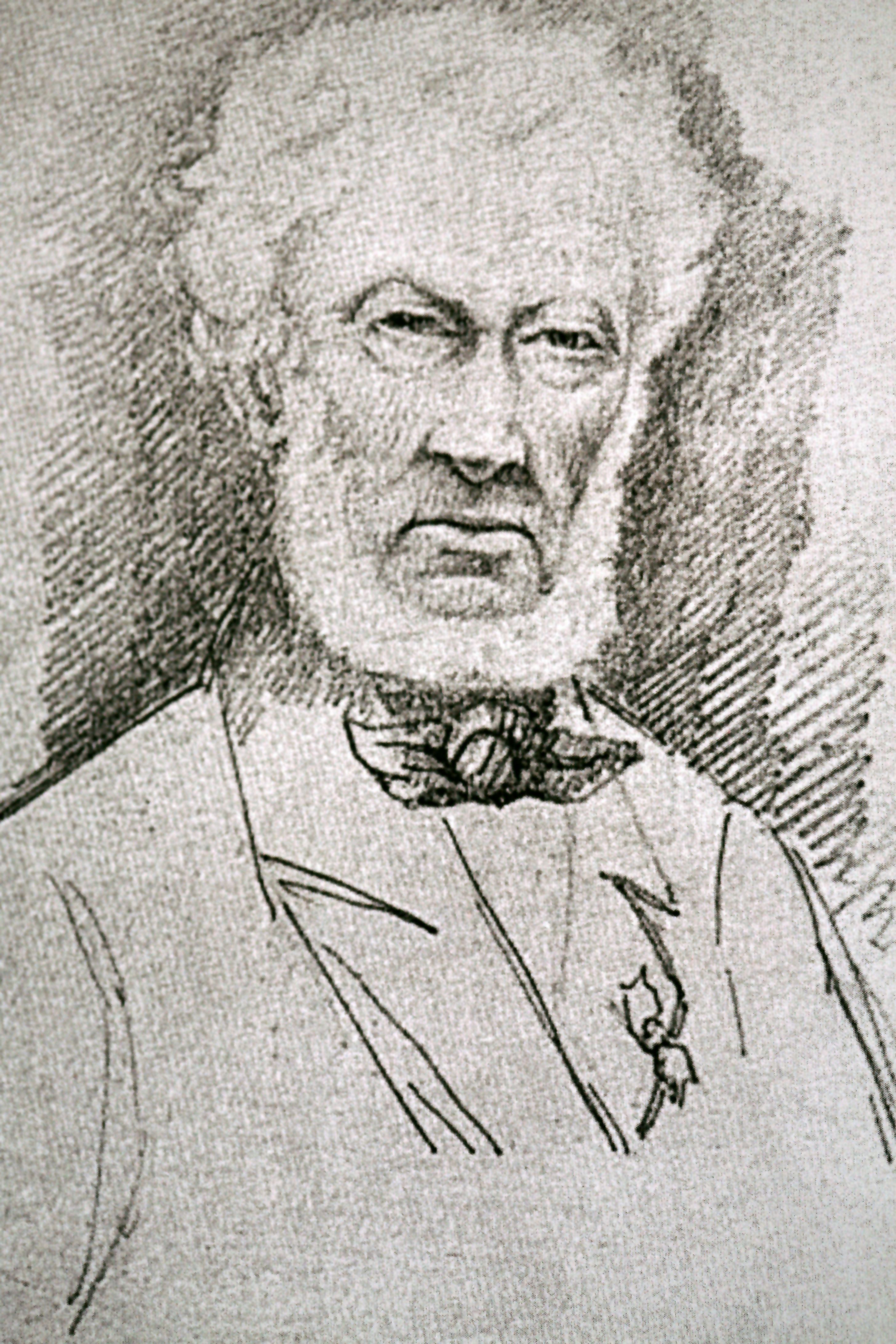
- Born: Nöel Frédéric Armand André de Lafresnaye; 24 July 1783; Falaise, Calvados, France
- Died: 14 July 1861 (aged 77); Falaise, Calvados, France
- Known for: Lafresnaye's piculet, Lafresnaye's woodcreeper and Lafresnaye's vanga (birds)
- Awards: Légion d'honneur
- Scientific career
- Fields: Entomology, ornithology
- Author abbrev. (zoology): Lafresnaye

Baron Nöel Frédéric Armand André de Lafresnaye (24 July 1783 – 14 July 1861) was a French ornithologist and collector.

Lafresnaye was born into an aristocratic family at Chateau de La Fresnaye in Falaise, Normandy. He took an early interest in natural history, particularly entomology. It was only after acquiring a collection of European birds that he turned his attention to ornithology.

Lafresnaye described a number of new bird species, some with Alcide d'Orbigny. He accumulated a collection of over 8,000 bird skins at his home. After his death the collection was purchased by the American collector Henry Bryant and donated to the Boston Natural History Society. It was transferred to the Museum of Comparative Zoology in 1914.

Lafresnaye's piculet, Lafresnaye's woodcreeper and Lafresnaye's vanga are avian species that bear his name, as is the monotypic hummingbird genus Lafresnaya.

== Selected works ==
- Contributions à l'ornithologie, 1832 - Contributions to ornithology.
- Catalogue des oiseaux de la collection de feu Mr. le bon. de Lafresnaye de Falaise, 1833 - Catalog of birds from the collection of Lafresnaye.
- Essai d'une nouvelle manière de grouper les genres et les espèces de l'ordre des passereaux (Passeres L.) d'après leurs rapports de moeurs et d'habitation, 1838 - Essay on a new method of grouping the genera and species of the order Passeriformes, etc.
- Monographie du genre Dendrocolaptes, 1849 - Monograph on the genus Dendrocolaptes.
- Sur quelques espèces d'oiseaux nouveaux ou peu connus du Chili et de la Colombie, 1855 - On some new, little known avian species of Chile and Colombia.
