= Lineated woodcreeper =

The lineated woodcreeper has been split into the following species:

- Guianan woodcreeper, Lepidocolaptes albolineatus
- Duida woodcreeper, Lepidocolaptes duidae
- Inambari woodcreeper, Lepidocolaptes fatimalimae
- Dusky-capped woodcreeper, Lepidocolaptes fuscicapillus
