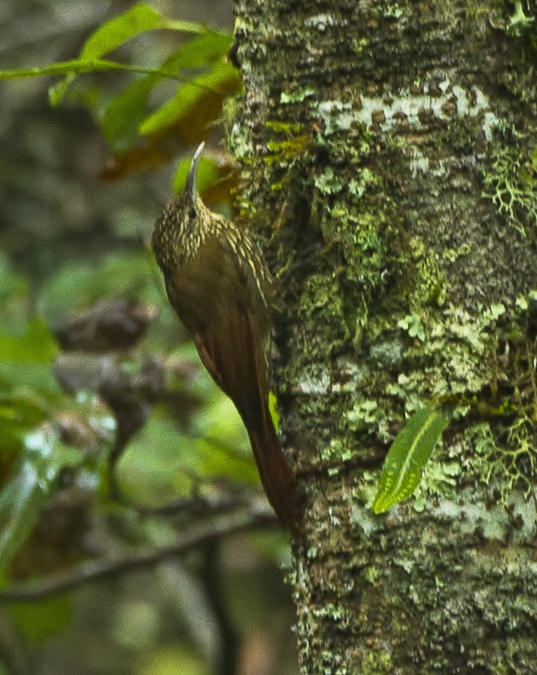

Conservation status
- Least Concern (IUCN 3.1)

- Least Concern (IUCN 3.1)

Scientific classification
- Kingdom: Animalia
- Phylum: Chordata
- Class: Aves
- Order: Passeriformes
- Family: Furnariidae
- Genus: Lepidocolaptes
- Species: L. affinis

Binomial name
- Lepidocolaptes affinis (Lafresnaye, 1839)

= Spot-crowned woodcreeper =

Species of bird

The spot-crowned woodcreeper (Lepidocolaptes affinis), is a passerine bird in the subfamily Dendrocolaptinae of the ovenbird family Furnariidae. it is found in Middle America from Mexico to Panama.

== Taxonomy and systematics ==
What is now the montane woodcreeper (L. lacrymiger) was formerly considered conspecific with the spot-crowned woodcreeper but they were split in the early 2000s. The spot-crowned woodcreeper's taxonomy since then remains unsettled. The International Ornithological Committee and the Clements taxonomy assign it these three subspecies:

- L. a. lignicida (Bangs & Penard, TE, 1919)
- L. a. affinis (Lafresnaye, 1839)
- L. a. neglectus (Ridgway, 1909)

However, BirdLife International's Handbook of the Birds of the World (HBW) treats L. a. neglectus as a separate species, the southern spot-crowned woodcreeper. It calls L. a. affinis and L. a. lignicida the northern spot-crowned woodcreeper.

This article follows the one species, three-subspecies, model.

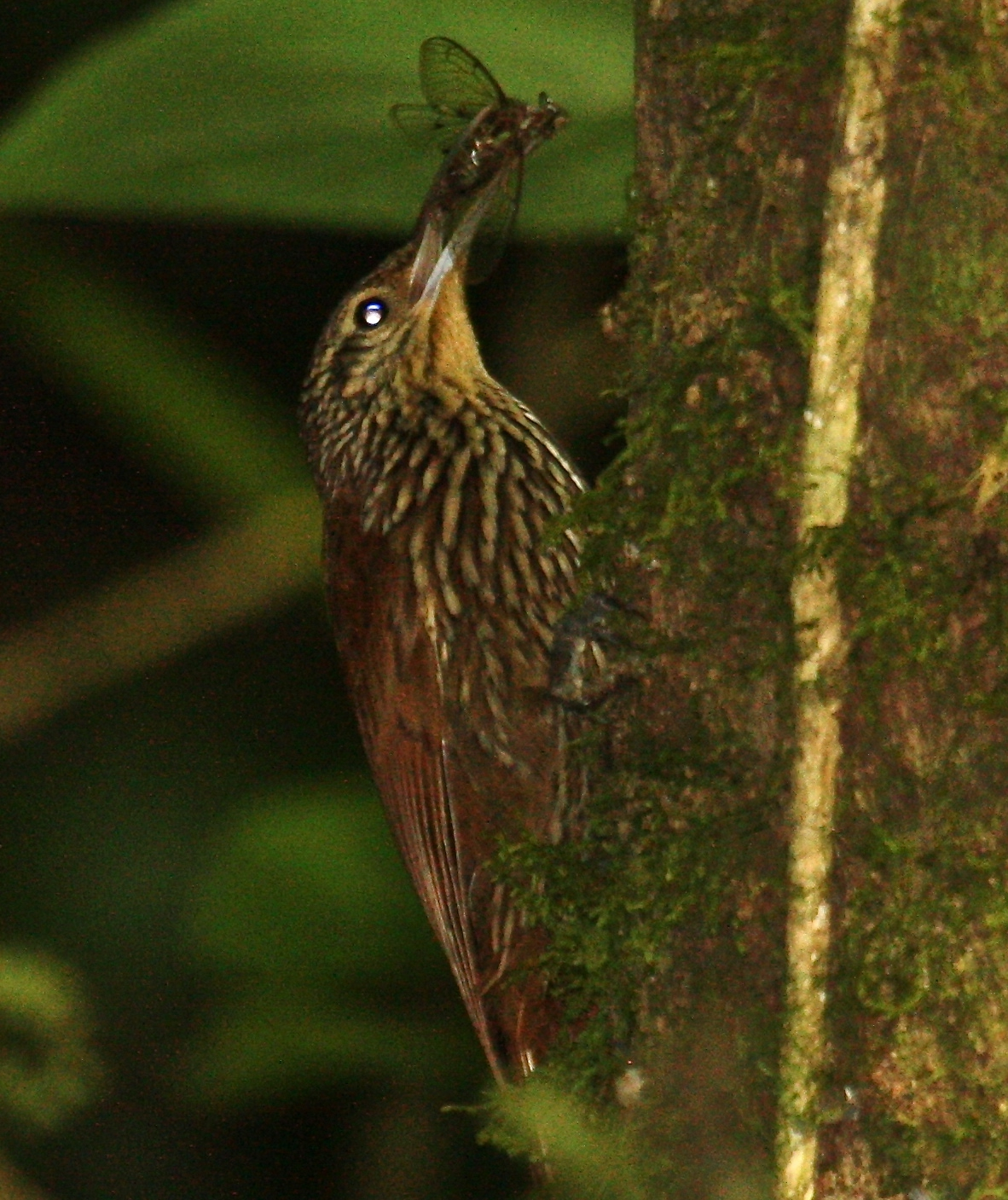
L. a. neglectus at Savegre Lodge, Costa Rica

== Description ==
The spot-crowned woodcreeper is 19 to 22 cm (7.5 to 8.7 in) long and weighs 28 to 38 g (0.99 to 1.3 oz). It is a slim, medium-sized woodcreeper with a slim, moderately decurved bill. The sexes have the same plumage. Adults of the nominate subspecies L. a. affinis have a dusky face and sides of the neck with a black malar stripe. Their crown and nape are dark brown with conspicuous buffy spots or diamonds that sometimes extend as thin streaks onto the upper back. Their back and wing coverts are plain brown, their rump rufous-cinnamon, and their wings and tail rufous-chestnut. Their flight feathers have brown edges and the primaries have dusky tips. Their underparts are olive-brown with wide black-edged buffy streaks beginning on the lowest part of the throat that fade on the flanks and undertail coverts. Their underwing coverts are ochraceous buff. Their iris is dark brown and their legs and feet lead-gray to dull green. Their bill is bluish pink, pale gray, yellowish, or dark brown; its base is often darker and the tip a pale silvery horn. Juveniles are darker overall than adults, with less conspicuous spots on the crown, less distinct borders on the underside streaks, and a shorter and darker bill.

Subspecies L. a. lignicida is similar to the nominate but much paler overall. L. a. neglectus is browner (less olivaceous) than the nominate, with a deeper buff throat and wider and paler, almost whitish, streaking on its underparts.

The spot-crowned woodcreeper is quite similar to the streak-headed woodcreeper (L. souleyetii) but is distuished by its spotted, not streaked, crown. In addition, their ranges only minimally overlap.

== Distribution and habitat ==
The spot-crowned woodcreeper's distribution is not continuous. Subspecies L. a. lignicida is the northernmost; it is found in the northeastern Mexican states of Nuevo León, Tamaulipas, and San Luis Potosí. The nominate L. a. affinis is found from southern Mexico south through Guatemala, Honduras, and El Salvador into Nicaragua. It does not occur in Belize. L. a. neglectus is found in Costa Rica and western Panama.

The spot-crowned woodcreeper inhabits both humid and dry forests, mostly in the highlands. These include humid evergreen montane forest and cloudforest as well as drier deciduous, oak, pine, and pine-oak woodlands. It is found in the interior of primary forest but is thought to be more common at its edges and in mature secondary forest. It also occurs in plantations and in clearings and pastures with trees. In elevation it mostly ranges between 1,000 and 3,500 m (3,300 and 11,500 ft) but is found as low as 400 m (1,300 ft) in the non-breeding season. In Costa Rica it rarely occurs below 1,500 m (4,900 ft).

== Behavior ==
=== Movement ===
The spot-crowned woodcreeper is mostly a year-round resident throughout its range, though some individuals move to lower elevations after the breeding season.

=== Feeding ===
The spot-crowned woodcreeper's diet is almost entirely arthropods; beetles and their egg cases appear to be a major component. It typically forages singly or in pairs and regularly joins mixed-species feeding flocks. It sometimes follows army ant swarms. It hitches up trunks and branches, often in a spiral, typically from the forest's midlevel to the subcanopy. It captures much prey from epiphytes; it also takes prey by gleaning from surfaces and by probing bark crevices and moss. It sometimes flakes off bark to expose prey.

=== Breeding ===
The spot-crowned woodcreeper breeds between March and June throughout its range. It nests in a cavity in a tree or stump, either natural or excavated by a woodpecker (Picidae} or barbet (Capitonidae), and usually within about 9 m (30 ft) of the ground. The cavity is lined with bark flakes brought by both members of a pair. The clutch size is usually two and sometimes three eggs. The incubation period is about 17 days and the time to fledging about 19 days. Both parents incubate the clutch and provision nestlings.

=== Vocalization ===
The songs of the northern two subspecies of the spot-crowned woodcreeper differ from that of the southern subspecies. The "northern" song is a "high-pitched rising phrase of typically 3 notes (occasionally 2 or 4) tseeu-tsee-tsee". Those subspecies make "tseeuee" and shorter "tseeu" calls. The southern subspecies L. a. neglectus sings "a long typically overslurred nasal note, followed by a fast trill of some 20–30 notes, that goes slightly up and down in pitch teeeu-titititititititititititititi". Its call is "teeeu". Both populations sing mostly at dawn and dusk.

== Status ==
The IUCN follows HBW taxonomy and so it separately assessed the "northern" and "southern" spot-crowned woodcreepers. Both are assessed as being of Least Concern. The "northern" has a large range; its population size is not known and is believed to be decreasing. The "southern" has a smaller range; its population size is also not known but is believed to be stable. No immediate threats to either have been identified. "Although this species requires at least patches of forest nearby, it is apparently less dependent on continuous forest than are many woodcreepers; [it] is therefore considered only moderately sensitive to human disturbance."
