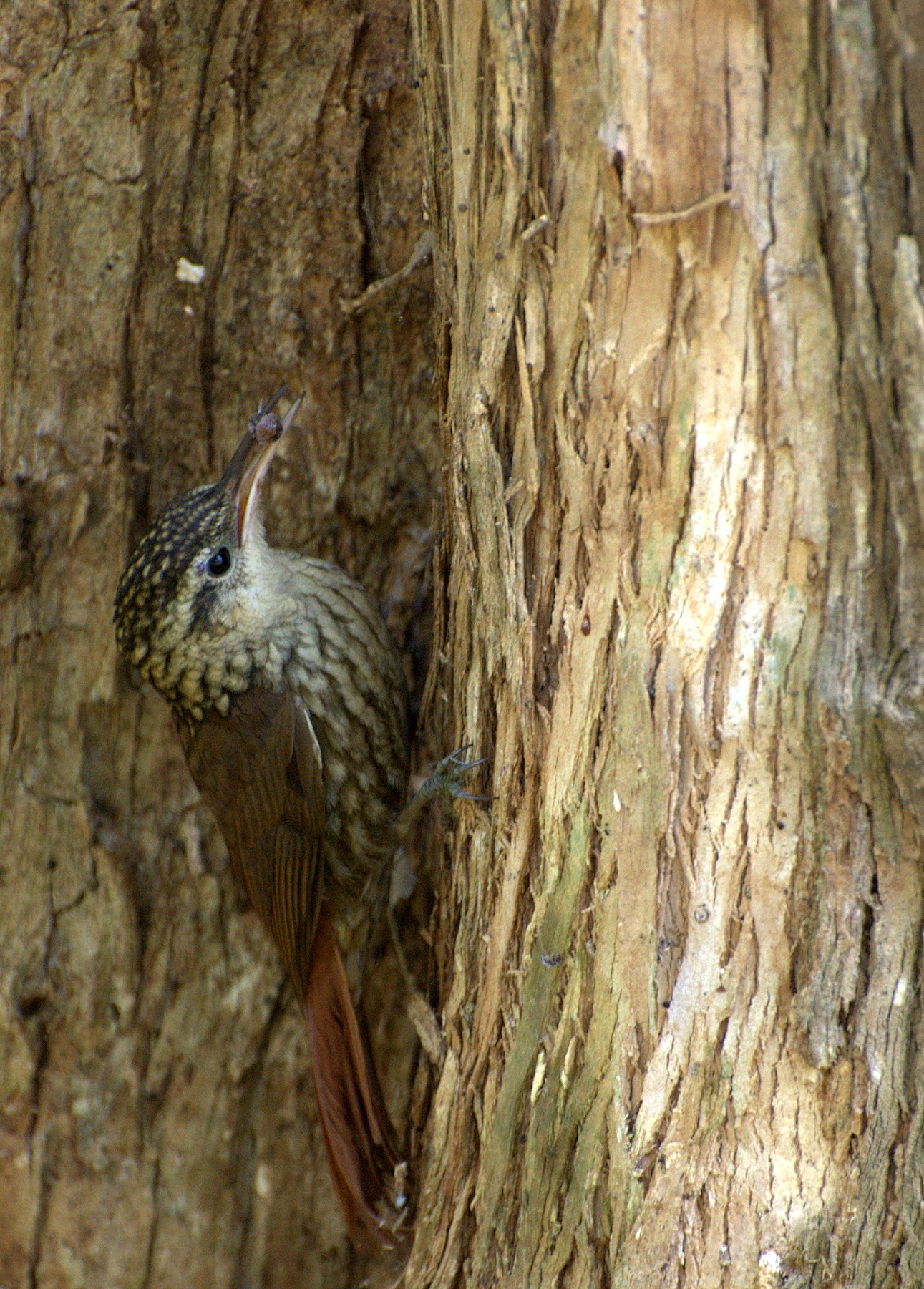

Conservation status
- Least Concern (IUCN 3.1)

Scientific classification
- Kingdom: Animalia
- Phylum: Chordata
- Class: Aves
- Order: Passeriformes
- Family: Furnariidae
- Genus: Lepidocolaptes
- Species: L. falcinellus

Binomial name
- Lepidocolaptes falcinellus (Cabanis & Heine, 1860)

= Scalloped woodcreeper =

Species of bird

The scalloped woodcreeper (Lepidocolaptes falcinellus) is a species of bird in the subfamily Dendrocolaptinae of the ovenbird family Furnariidae. It is found in Argentina. Brazil, Paraguay, and Uruguay.

== Taxonomy and systematics ==
The scalloped woodcreeper and what is now the scaled woodcreeper (L. squamatus) were previously considered conspecific and are now treated as sister species. The scalloped woodcreeper is monotypic.

== Description ==
The scalloped woodcreeper is 17 to 20 cm (6.7 to 7.9 in) long and weighs 26 to 30 g (0.92 to 1.1 oz). It is a medium-sized woodcreeper with a longish somewhat decurved bill. The sexes have the same plumage. Adults' faces are creamy white with blackish mottling and have creamy white lores and supercilium. Their crown and nape are dusky to dull black with obvious rich buff spots that often continue as faint streaks onto the upper back. Their back and wing coverts are olive-brown to cinnamon-brown, and their rump and tail rufous-chestnut. Their flight feathers have brown outer webs, chestnut inner webs, and blackish brown tips. Their throat is whitish. Their underparts are olive with bold, blackish-edged, buff streaks that give a scaly appearance. Their underwing coverts are cinnamon. Their iris is brown and their legs and feet greenish gray to greenish brown. Their bill's maxilla is gray, light brown, or pinkish, often with a darker base, and their mandible is creamy white to light brown.

== Distribution and habitat ==
The scalloped woodcreeper is found from northeastern São Paulo state in southern Brazil south to Alto Paraná Department in southeastern Paraguay, Misiones and Corrientes provinces in northeastern Argentina, and extreme northeastern Uruguay. It inhabits humid Atlantic Forest and drier forest in the planalto. In the northern part of its range it occurs in montane evergreen forest and rainforest, further south in Araucaria forest, and infrequently in semi-deciduous forest in the southwest. It occurs at the edges and interior of primary forest and older secondary forest. In elevation it mostly ranges from the lowlands to 1,600 m (5,200 ft) and only rarely is found up to 2,000 m (6,600 ft).

== Behavior ==
=== Movement ===
The scalloped woodcreeper is believed to be a year-round resident throughout its range.

=== Feeding ===
The scalloped woodcreeper's diet is not known in detail but appears to be mostly arthropods. It usually forages singly or in pairs, and often joins mixed-species feeding flocks. It hitches up trunks and along branches, mostly from the forest's mid-level to the canopy but sometimes in the understory. It takes most of its prey from epiphytes, bromeliads, moss, and bark surfaces and crevices. It has been observed making sallies to catch prey in mid-air.

=== Breeding ===
The scalloped woodcreeper's breeding season has not been defined but appears to span at least October to December. It nests in cavities in trees that it lines with bark flakes. One nest held two eggs. The incubation period is 15 to 16 days and fledging occurs 18 to 19 days after hatch. Both parents brood and provision nestlings.

=== Vocalization ===
The scalloped woodcreeper's song has not been put into words. Its call is "a somewhat slurred rattle, described as 'pit, eu-u-u', 'pee-u-u-u' or 'peekku' ".

== Status ==
The IUCN has assessed the scalloped woodcreeper as being of Least Concern. It has a fairly large range, and though its population size is not known it is believed to be stable. No immediate threats have been identified. It is considered fairly common to common in the core of its range and less common at its perimeter. It is "[g]enerally believed to be highly sensitive to human disturbance; nevertheless, is able to exist in moderate numbers in older second growth and even relatively small forest fragments in [southern] Brazil." It occurs in several protected areas.
