= Louis Denise =

French librarian and ornithologist (1863–1914)

Louis Simon Denise (5 June 1863, Paris – 30 June 1914, Paris) was a French librarian and ornithologist.

== Career ==
During Denise's career, he served as head librarian at the Bibliothèque nationale de France in Paris. With Auguste Ménégaux, he published the ornithological journal, Revue française d'ornithologie scientifique et pratique (from 1910). His name is associated with Atlapetes semirufus denisei, a subspecies of ochre-breasted brush finch that was circumscribed by Carl Eduard Hellmayr (1911).

In 1889 he took part in the creation of the modern Mercure de France. He participated in the Le Chat Noir, a nineteenth-century entertainment establishment, and was a good friend of the poets Albert Samain and Louis Le Cardonnel and of the novelist Léon Bloy.

== Published works ==
With Francisque Vial, he published works in regards to literary ideas and doctrines of the 17th, 18th and 19th centuries:

- Idées et doctrines littéraires du XVIIe siècle : extraits des préfaces, traités et autres écrits théoriques, 1906.
- Idées et doctrines littéraires du XVIIIe siècle : extraits des préfaces, traités et autres écrits théoriques, 1909.
- Idées et doctrines littéraires du XIXe siècle : extraits des préfaces, traités et autres écrits théoriques, 1919. Other works associated with Denise are:
- La Merveilleuse doxologie du lapidaire ("Mercure de France", Paris, 1893).
- Bibliographie historique et iconographique du Jardin des plantes, Jardin royal des plantes médicinales et Muséum d'histoire naturelle (H. Daragon, Paris, 1903) – Historical and iconographic bibliography of the "Jardin des plantes".
- Bibliothèque nationale. Catalogue des ouvrages de Buffon conservés au département des imprimés (Imprimerie nationale, Paris, 1905).
- Bibliothèque nationale. Catalogue des ouvrages de Calderon conservés au département des imprimés (Imprimerie nationale, Paris, 1905).
- Bibliothèque nationale. Département des imprimés. Catalogue des ouvrages de Cervantès (Imprimerie nationale, Paris, 1906).
- Bibliothèque nationale. Département des imprimés. Catalogue des ouvrages de César (Imprimerie nationale, Paris, 1906).
- Bibliothèque nationale. Catalogue des ouvrages de Descartes conservés au département des imprimés (Imprimerie nationale, Paris, 1909).
- Les Oiseaux lumineux et le livre "De Luce animalium" de Thomas Bartholin (1647); (H. Tessier, Orléans, 1910).
- Bibliothèque nationale. Catalogue des ouvrages de François de Sales conservés au département des imprimés. (Imprimerie nationale, Paris, 1914).
