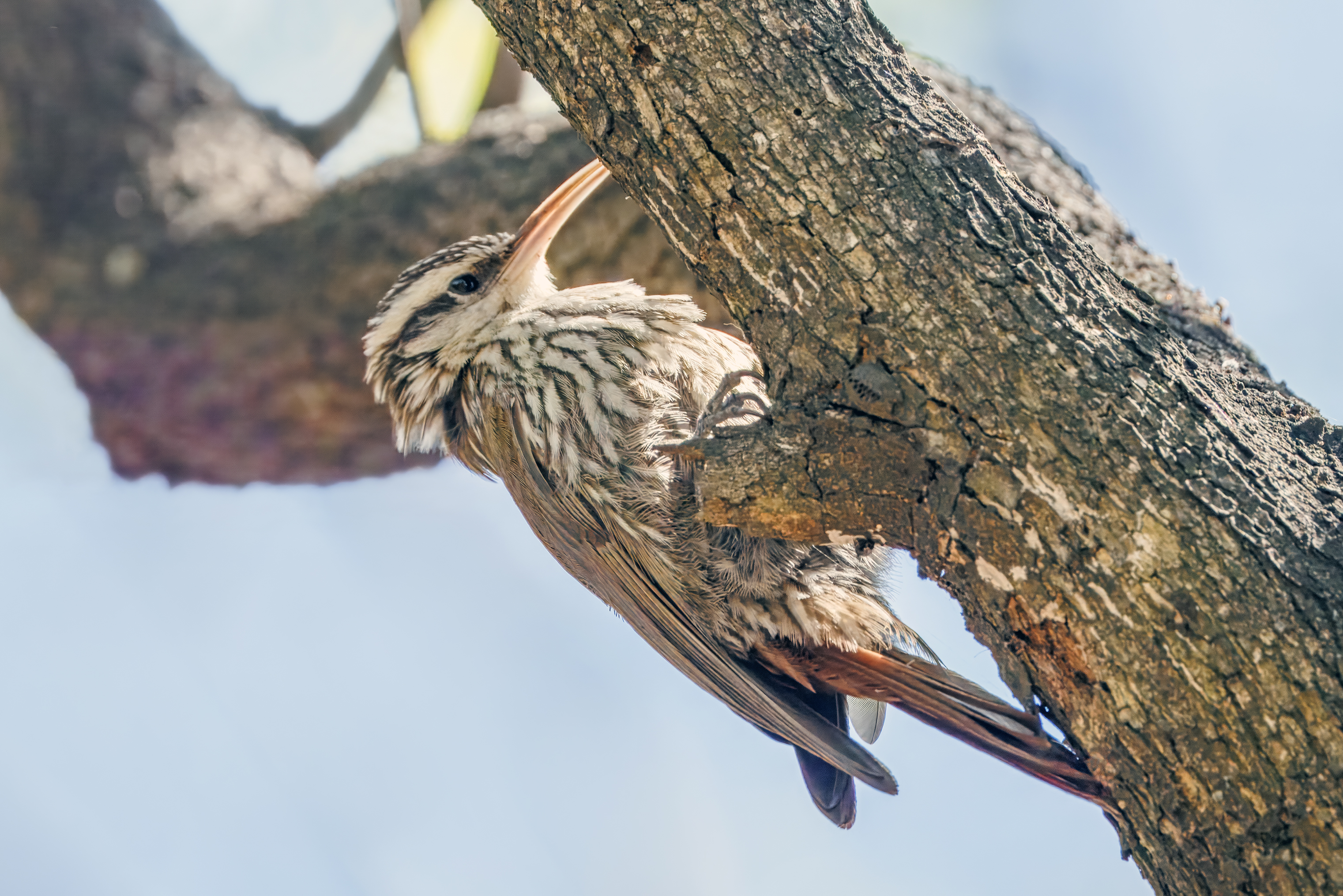
- in Argentina

Conservation status
- Least Concern (IUCN 3.1)

Scientific classification
- Kingdom: Animalia
- Phylum: Chordata
- Class: Aves
- Order: Passeriformes
- Family: Furnariidae
- Genus: Lepidocolaptes
- Species: L. angustirostris

Binomial name
- Lepidocolaptes angustirostris (Vieillot, 1818)

= Narrow-billed woodcreeper =

Species of bird

The narrow-billed woodcreeper (Lepidocolaptes angustirostris) is a species of bird in the subfamily Dendrocolaptinae of the ovenbird family Furnariidae. It is found in Argentina, Bolivia, Brazil, Paraguay, Suriname, and Uruguay.

== Taxonomy and systematics ==
The narrow-billed woodcreeper has these eight subspecies:

- L. a. griseiceps Mees, 1974
- L. a. coronatus (Lesson, RP, 1830)
- L. a. bahiae (Hellmayr, 1903)
- L. a. bivittatus (Lichtenstein, MHC, 1822)
- L. a. hellmayri Naumburg, 1925
- L. a. certhiolus (Todd, 1913)
- L. a. angustirostris (Vieillot, 1818)
- L. a. praedatus (Cherrie, 1916)

Several other subspecies have also been proposed as splits from the existing ones. All of the subspecies that adjoin each other intergrade, to the point where some authors have advocated treating the species as monotypic.

== Description ==
The narrow-billed woodcreeper is 18 to 22 cm (7.1 to 8.7 in) long; males weigh 23 to 37.5 g (0.81 to 1.3 oz) and females 21.5 to 33.5 g (0.76 to 1.2 oz). It is a slim, medium-sized woodcreeper with a long, slim, moderately decurved bill. The sexes have the same plumage. Adults of the nominate subspecies L. a. angustirostris have pale lores, a buffy white supercilium that widens to the rear and becomes a line of broken spots, and a black stripe behind the eye. Their crown and nape are blackish brown with whitish buff streaks. Their back and wing coverts are rufous brown with a faint olive tinge; some coverts have dusky outer webs and others olive. Their wings, rump, and tail are rufous-chestnut with browner outer webs and blackish tips on the primaries. Their throat and cheeks are plain whitish. Their breast and belly are buffy-white with dusky spots or streaks; the markings disappear on the lower belly and reappear on the undertail coverts. Their underwing coverts are rosy-cinnamon. Their iris is brown to chestnut, their bill pale gray to pinkish horn with dusky sides on the base of the mandible, and their legs and feet greenish gray to dark gray. Juveniles have darker upperparts than adults, with a more blackish head, more ochraceous supercilium and underparts, and more distinct streaks on the latter.

The subspecies of the narrow-billed woodcreeper differ mostly in the tone of their upper- and underparts and in how much streaking they have. They differ from the nominate and each other thus:

- L. a. praedatus, larger and longer-billed than nominate, more olive-brown and less rufous upperparts, heavier and darker underparts streaking
- L. a. certhiolus, lighter and more cinnamon-rufous to ferruginous upperparts than nominate
- L. a. bivittatus, more rufescent upperparts than nominate, creamy to dirty grayish white underparts with indistinct streaks
- L. a. hellmayri, deeper rufous upperparts with more conspicuous streaks than bivittatus
- L. a. coronatus, more rufescent upperparts than nominate, deeper buff underparts than bivittatus, minimally streaked undertail coverts
- L. a. bahiae, more rufescent upperparts than nominate, deep cinnamon to ochraceus underparts
- L. a. griseiceps, palest subspecies but more rufescent upperparts than nominate, unstreaked creamy white underparts

== Distribution and habitat ==
The subspecies of the narrow-billed woodcreeper are found thus. The boundaries between some subspecies are ill defined, especially that between L. a. angustirostris and L. a. praedatus.

- L. a. griseiceps, Sipaliwini Savanna in southern Suriname, and possibly Amapá and Pará and in northern Brazil
- L. a. coronatus, northeastern Brazil from Maranhão and Piauí south to Tocantins and Bahia
- L. a. bahiae, Brazil in Bahia east of Rio São Francisco; those north of the river from Ceará to Alagoas are thought to be this subspecies
- L. a. bivittatus, central and southeastern Brazil from Mato Grosso to São Paulo, in Pará south of the Amazon River, and in northern and eastern Bolivia
- L. a. hellmayri, Cochabamba, Santa Cruz, and Tarija departments in central Bolivia
- L. a. certhiolus, Bolivia from southwestern Santa Cruz to Tarija, western Paraguay's Alto Paraguay Department, and Jujuy and Salta provinces in northwestern Argentina
- L. a. angustirostris, southern Brazil's Mato Grosso do Sul and eastern Paraguay
- L. a. praedatus, north and central Argentina south to Mendoza, La Pampa, and Buenos Aires provinces; western and central Uruguay, and Brazil's Rio Grande do Sul

The narrow-billed woodcreeper inhabits a variety of semi-open and open landscapes, mostly in the tropical zone but reaching the subtropics in the eastern Andean foothills. These include deciduous forest, Gran Chaco woodlands and scrublands, gallery forest, secondary forest, caatinga, cerrado, plantations, and open parts of populated areas. It is found less frequently in palm swamps. In most of its range it occurs from the lowlands to 1,200 m (3,900 ft); it reaches 3,000 m (9,800 ft) in Bolivia.

== Behavior ==
=== Movement ===
The narrow-billed woodcreeper is a year-round resident throughout its range.

=== Feeding ===
The narrow-billed woodcreeper's diet is mostly invertebrates like insects and spiders but it has been observed taking a small frog. It typically forages singly or in pairs though sometimes in small groups, and regularly joins mixed-species feeding flocks. It very rarely follows army ant swarms. It hitches up trunks and branches, often in a spiral, typically from near the ground to the subcanopy. It captures prey by gleaning from the surface and by probing bark crevices, epiphytes, and moss. It sometimes flakes off bark to expose prey, and has been observed catching moths around street lights.

=== Breeding ===
The narrow-billed woodcreeper's breeding seasons vary somewhat across its range but generally fall between September and February. It nests in cavities, either natural or excavated by woodpeckers in trees but also in human constructs such as bridge supports. The cavities usually are less than 4 m (13 ft) above the ground and are lined with leaves, grasses, or bark and wood chips. The clutch size is usually three or four eggs (sometimes two); both parents incubate them. The incubation period, time to fledging, and other details of parental care are not known.

=== Vocalization ===
The narrow-billed woodcreeper's song is "a loud series 3–5 seconds long of 4–8 sharp descending notes that may be either clear whistles 'peer, peer, peer, peeer, peeeer, pweeeer', rolling and somewhat slurred repetitions of 'drewEEew', or clear notes that gradually accelerate, fade and descend, 'peeé, pee-pee-pee-pee-peepeepeepeepupupu'." Its calls include "a slurred note", "jew-rewt", and "peah huy".

== Status ==
The IUCN has assessed the narrow-billed woodcreeper as being of Least Concern. It has a very large range, and though its population size is not known it is believed to be increasing. No immediate threats have been identified. It is considered fairly common to locally common in most of its range but uncommon in parts of it. It seems to be "only moderately sensitive to human disturbance [and] not to be adversely affected by forest fragmentation in S Brazil."
