= Auguste Ménégaux =

Henri Auguste Ménégaux (17 May 1857 – 15 July 1937) was a French ornithologist and malacologist born in Audincourt. He was based at the Muséum national d'histoire naturelle in Paris. From 1910, with Louis Denise (1863-1914), he was publisher of the journal, Revue Française d'Ornithologie Scientifique et Pratique.

In 1899 he supported his graduate thesis at the Sorbonne with a dissertation on marine bivalves titled Recherches sur la circulation des Lamellibranches marins. In 1901 he replaced Eugène de Pousargues (1859-1901) as assistant to Émile Oustalet (1844-1905) at the Muséum national d'histoire naturelle (mammals and birds). Later he became deputy director of the laboratory headed by Édouard Louis Trouessart (1842-1927).

His studies included birds collected by the French Antarctic Expedition commanded by Jean-Baptiste Charcot (1867-1936). In 1912 he became a founder of the Ligue pour la Protection des Oiseaux (League for the Protection of Birds).

Ménégaux was the first to describe seven bird species, and an additional five subspecies, including the first description of the montane woodcreeper subspecies Lepidocolaptes lacrymiger aequatorialis.

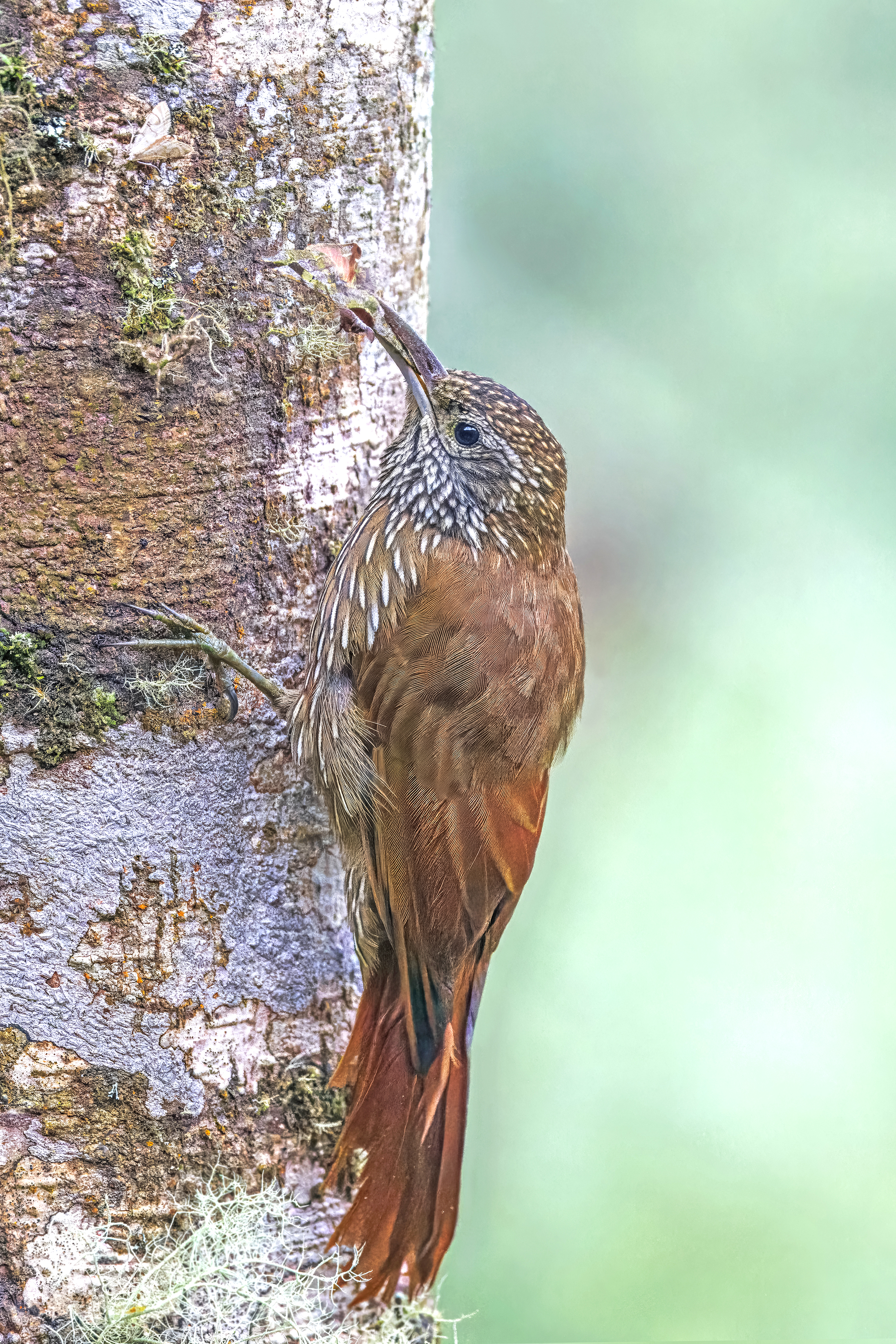
Montane woodcreeper (L. l. aequatorialis). This subspecies was first described by Ménégaux.

== Written works ==
- Les oiseaux de France (Birds of France); four volumes
- Etude des especes critiques et des types du groupe des Passereaux tracheophones de l'Amerique tropicale appartenant aux collections du Museum, 1906
- Voyage de M. Guy Babault dans l'Afrique orientale anglaise et dans l'Ouganda : etude d'une collection d'oiseaux de l'Afrique orientale anglaise et de l'Ouganda, 1923.
