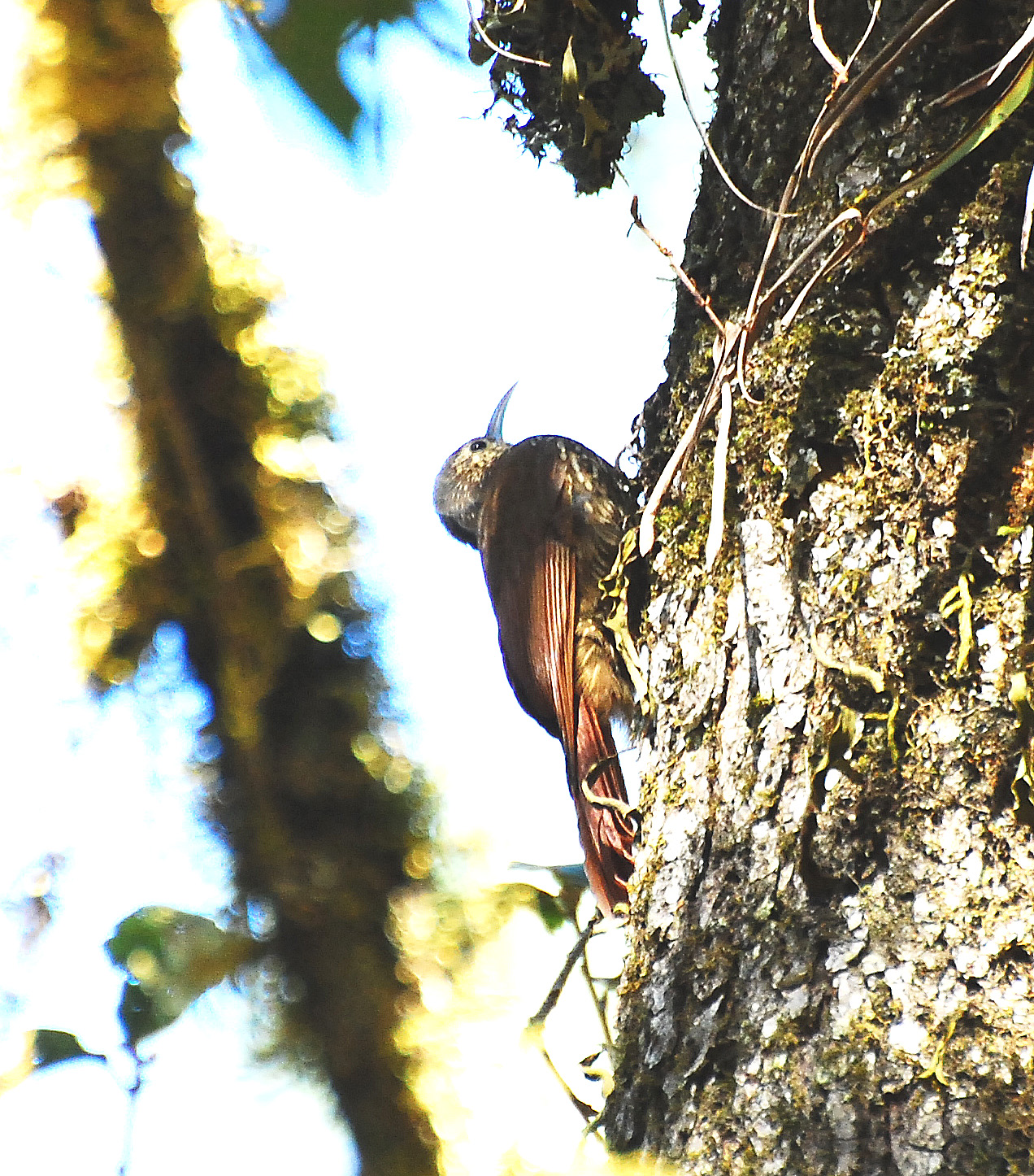
- Spot-crowned woodcreeper (Lepidocolaptes affinis)

Scientific classification
- Kingdom: Animalia
- Phylum: Chordata
- Class: Aves
- Order: Passeriformes
- Family: Furnariidae
- Subfamily: Dendrocolaptinae
- Genus: Lepidocolaptes; Reichenbach, 1853

Type species
- Dendrocolaptes squamatus Scaled woodcreeper Lichtenstein, 1822

Species
- see text

= Lepidocolaptes =

Genus of birds

Lepidocolaptes is a genus of birds in the ovenbird family Furnariidae. These are relatively small woodcreepers (subfamily Dendrocolaptinae) with fairly long, thin and slightly decurved bills.

== Taxonomy ==
The genus Lepidocolaptes was introduced in 1853 by the German naturalist Ludwig Reichenbach. The name combines the Ancient Greek lepis meaning "scale" with kolaptēs meaning "pecker". The type species was designated as the scaled woodcreeper by George Robert Gray in 1855.

=== Species ===
The genus contains 11 species:

| Image | Scientific name | Common name | Distribution |
|---|---|---|---|
| | Lepidocolaptes leucogaster | White-striped woodcreeper | Mexico. |
| | Lepidocolaptes souleyetii | Streak-headed woodcreeper | southern Mexico to northwestern Peru, northern Brazil and Guyana, and also on Trinidad. |
| | Lepidocolaptes angustirostris | Narrow-billed woodcreeper | Argentina, Bolivia, Brazil, Paraguay, Suriname, and Uruguay. |
| | Lepidocolaptes affinis | Spot-crowned woodcreeper | central Mexico in the east, the Sierra Madre Orientals, to northern Panama. |
| | Lepidocolaptes lacrymiger | Montane woodcreeper | Bolivia, Colombia, Ecuador, Peru, and Venezuela. |
| | Lepidocolaptes squamatus | Scaled woodcreeper | Brazil. |
| | Lepidocolaptes falcinellus | Scalloped woodcreeper | southeastern Brazil, eastern Paraguay and far northeastern Argentina. |
| | Lepidocolaptes albolineatus | Guianan woodcreeper | Brazil, French Guiana, Suriname, Guyana, and eastern Venezuela. |
| | Lepidocolaptes duidae | Duida woodcreeper | Brazil, Colombia, Ecuador, Peru, and Venezuela. |
| | Lepidocolaptes fatimalimae | Inambari woodcreeper | southwestern Amazonia |
| | Lepidocolaptes fuscicapillus | Dusky-capped woodcreeper (formerly named Rondonia woodcreeper) | southeastern Amazonia |

The lesser woodcreeper was formerly included in this genus, but is now in Xiphorhynchus.
