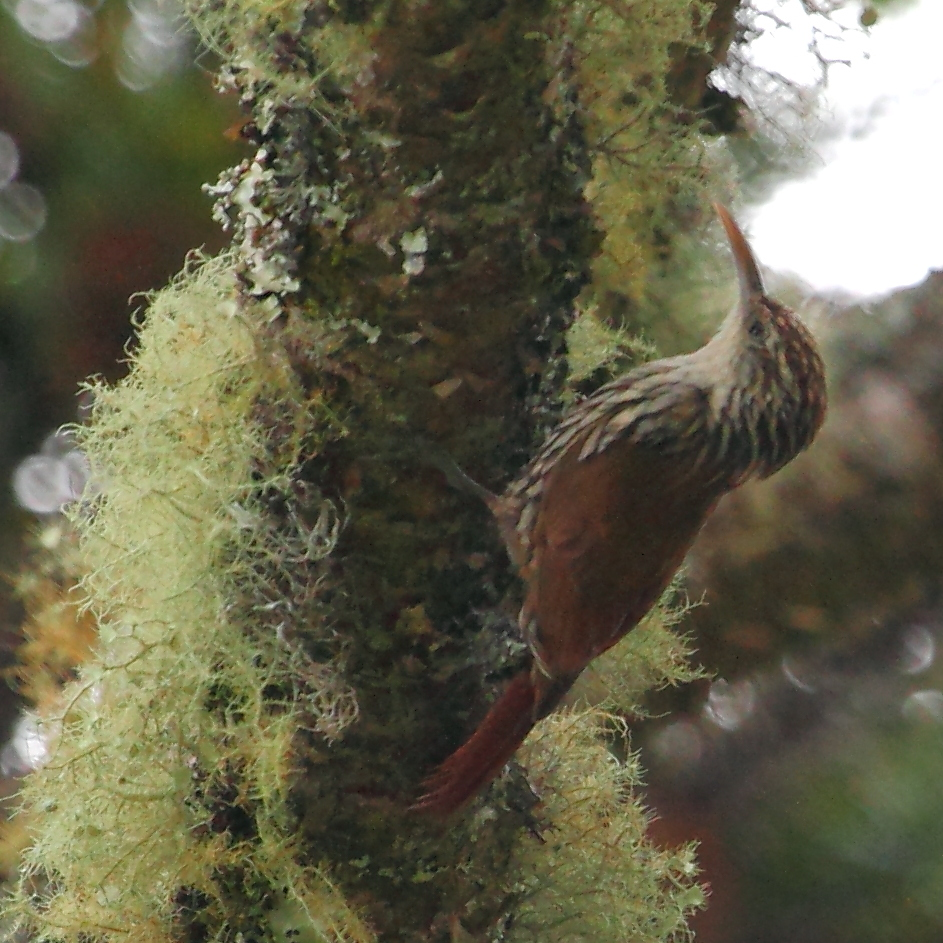
- Scaled woodcreeper L. s. squamatus at Campos do Jordão, São Paulo state, Brazil

Conservation status
- Least Concern (IUCN 3.1)

Scientific classification
- Kingdom: Animalia
- Phylum: Chordata
- Class: Aves
- Order: Passeriformes
- Family: Furnariidae
- Genus: Lepidocolaptes
- Species: L. squamatus

Binomial name
- Lepidocolaptes squamatus (Lichtenstein, MHC, 1822)

= Scaled woodcreeper =

Species of bird in Brazil

The scaled woodcreeper (Lepidocolaptes squamatus) is a species of bird in the subfamily Dendrocolaptinae of the ovenbird family Furnariidae. It is endemic to Brazil.

== Taxonomy and systematics ==
The scaled woodcreeper and what is now the scalloped woodcreeper (L. falcinellus) were previously considered conspecific and are now treated as sister species. Worldwide taxonomic systems assign the scaled woodcreeper two subspecies, the nominate L. s. squamatus (Lichtenstein, MHC, 1822) and L. s. wagleri (Spix, 1824). At least one author treats these subspecies as individual species. However, the genetic distance between them is small, suggesting that the two subspecies would be better if merged to create a monotypic species.

== Description ==
The scaled woodcreeper is 19 to 20 cm (7.5 to 7.9 in) long and weighs about 27 g (0.95 oz). It is a medium-sized woodcreeper with a slim, somewhat decurved bill. The sexes have the same plumage. Adults of the nominate subspecies have a dusky face with whitish streaks and a whitish supercilium that is often broken. Their crown is dark brown lightly spotted with buff. Their back is bright reddish brown and their rump, wings, and tail cinnamon-rufous. Their throat is whitish. Their breast and belly are dusky brown with bold, black-edged, whitish streaks. Their iris is reddish brown to brown and their legs and feet olive-gray to blackish. Their bill is horn-colored to pinkish with a darker maxilla. Subspecies L. s. wagleri is slightly smaller than the nominate, with brighter cinnamon-rufous upperparts, less contrast between crown and back, and more brownish underparts with dimmer dark edges to the streaks.

== Distribution and habitat ==
The nominate subspecies of the scaled woodcreeper is found in eastern and southeastern Brazil. It occurs south and east of the Rio São Francisco from central Bahia south to northern São Paulo. Subspecies L. s. wagleri is found in northeastern Brazil north of the Rio São Francisco in southern Piauí, western Bahia, and northern Minas Gerais.

The scaled woodcreeper's two subspecies inhabit different landscapes. The nominate L. s. squamatus inhabits humid Atlantic Forest, especially montane evergreen forest and low elevation rainforest but also gallery forest at the western edge of its range. Subspecies L. s. wagleri inhabits drier landscapes including semi-deciduous and deciduous woodlands, caatinga, and gallery forest. Both subspecies occur at the edges and interior of primary forest and older secondary forest. In elevation the species ranges mostly from sea level to 1,600 m (5,200 ft) but is found occasionally as high as 2,000 m (6,600 ft).

== Behavior ==
=== Movement ===
The scaled woodcreeper is believed to be a year-round resident throughout its range.

=== Feeding ===
The scaled woodcreeper's diet is not known in detail but appears to be mostly arthropods. It usually forages singly, occasionally in pairs, and often joins mixed-species feeding flocks. It hitches up trunks and along slim branches, mostly from the forest's mid-level to the canopy but sometimes lower.

=== Breeding ===
The scaled woodcreeper's breeding season has not been defined but includes October. It has been observed nesting in natural cavities and in cavities in buildings. Nothing else is known about its breeding biology.

=== Vocalization ===
The song of the scaled woodcreeper's nominate subspecies is a "series of sharp, connected 'pi' notes, slightly rising and slowing down and sharply falling off at [the] end". Its call is "péeir". The song and call of L. s. wagleri are not well known but appear to be similar to those of the nominate.

== Status ==
The IUCN has assessed the scaled woodcreeper as being of Least Concern. It has a large range, but its population size is not known and is believed to be decreasing. No immediate threats have been identified. The nominate subspecies is considered uncommon to locally fairly common; L. s. wagleri is more local. The species "[r]equires relatively intact forest, and [is] thus highly sensitive to human disturbance." Much of L. s. wagleri's habitat has been lost to deforestation. Both subspecies do occur in several protected areas.
