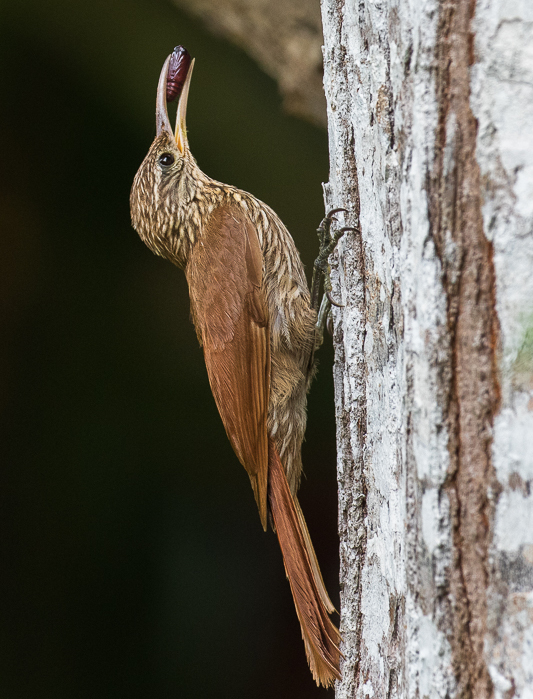

Conservation status
- Least Concern (IUCN 3.1)

Scientific classification
- Kingdom: Animalia
- Phylum: Chordata
- Class: Aves
- Order: Passeriformes
- Family: Furnariidae
- Genus: Lepidocolaptes
- Species: L. souleyetii

Binomial name
- Lepidocolaptes souleyetii (Lafresnaye, 1849)

= Streak-headed woodcreeper =

Species of bird

The streak-headed woodcreeper (Lepidocolaptes souleyetii) is a passerine bird in the subfamily Dendrocolaptinae of the ovenbird family Furnariidae. It is found in Mexico, Central America, Brazil, Colombia, Ecuador, Guyana, Peru, Venezuela, and on Trinidad.

== Taxonomy and systematics ==
The streak-headed woodcreeper has these seven subspecies:

- L. s. guerrerensis Van Rossem, 1939
- L. s. compressus (Cabanis, 1861)
- L. s. lineaticeps (Lafresnaye, 1850)
- L. s. littoralis (Hartert, EJO & Goodson, 1917)
- L. s. uaireni Phelps, WH & Phelps, WH Jr, 1950
- L. s. esmeraldae Chapman, 1923
- L. s. souleyetii (Lafresnaye, 1849)

The streak-headed woodcreeper's specific epithet commemorates Louis François Auguste Souleyet, French zoologist and naval surgeon.

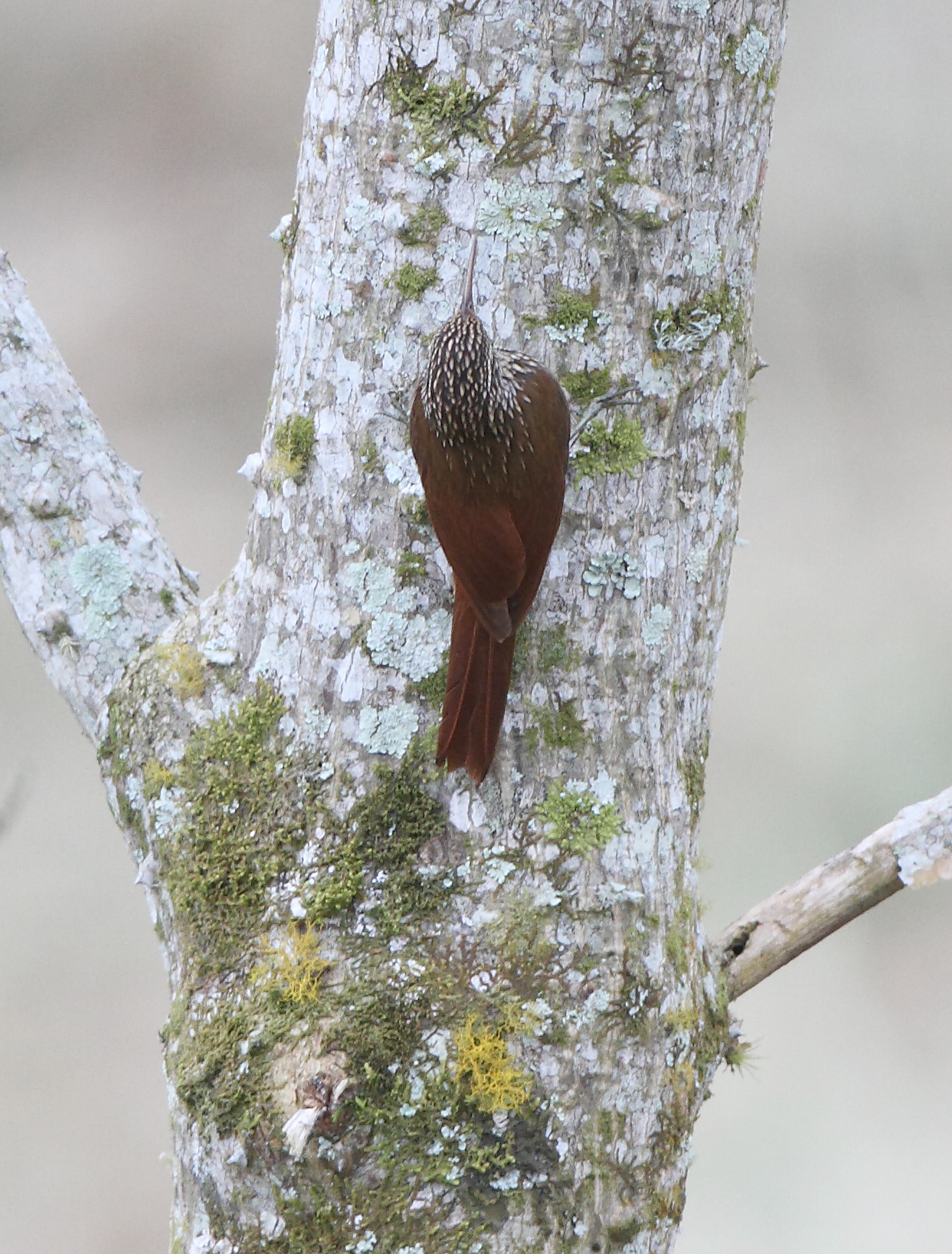
L. s. compressus, Turrialba, Costa Rica

== Description ==
The streak-headed woodcreeper is 19 to 21 cm (7.5 to 8.3 in) long and weighs 23 to 31 g (0.81 to 1.1 oz). It is a slim, medium-sized woodcreeper with a longish, slender, decurved bill. The sexes have the same plumage. Adults of the nominate subspecies L. s. souleyetii have a face with thin whitish buff and dark brown streaks; the sides of the neck are more heavily streaked. They have a whitish buff supercilium and eyering. Their crown and nape are dark brown with bold whitish buff streaks that often extend onto the upper back. Their back and wing coverts are rufous-olive to cinnamon-brown. Their flight feathers, rump, and tail are cinnamon-rufous to rufous-chestnut. Their primaries have brownish edges and dusky tips. Their throat is whitish buff to pale cinnamon. Their underparts are grayish olive to buffy brown with black-edged whitish buff streaks. The streaks are wide on the breast and sides, those on the belly and flanks narrower, and those on the undertail coverts minimal. Their underwing coverts are ochraceous to pale cinnamon-buff. Their iris is pale brown or brown, their bill pale brown or horn with most of the mandible bluish-pink, and their legs and feet grayish olive-green. Juveniles are very similar to adults but with small scattered dusky spots instead of streaks on their underparts.

The other subspecies of the streak-headed woodcreeper differ from the nominate and each other thus:

- L. s. lineaticeps, crown and underparts streaks narrower than nominate's; rufous of rump, wings, and tail darker, dark brownish maxilla
- L. s. littoralis, like lineaticeps but smaller, paler, less rufescent above and more buffy below
- L. s. uaireni, like lineaticeps but darker overall, more whitish (less buffy) streaks, blacker edges on underparts streaks
- L. s. compressus, like lineaticeps but darker with wider streaks above and below, pale buff to whitish throat
- L. s. guerrerensis, slightly larger, paler red above, grayer below than compressus
- L. s. esmeraldae, deeper buff throat and underparts streaks than nominate, shorter bill

== Distribution and habitat ==
The subspecies of the streak-headed woodcreeper are found thus:

- L. s. guerrerensis, Mexico's Sierra Madre del Sur in Guerrero and Oaxaca
- L. s. compressus, from Veracruz, Campeche, and Chiapas in southern Mexico through Central America into western Panama
- L. s. lineaticeps, from Panama's Canal Zone into northern and eastern Colombia and western Venezuela
- L. s. littoralis, Trinidad, northeastern Colombia's Atlántico Department and Santa Marta region, central Venezuela, Guyana, and extreme northern Brazil
- L. s. uaireni, southeastern Venezuela's Bolívar state
- L. s. esmeraldae, from southwestern Colombia's Nariño Department south in Ecuador into El Oro Province
- L. s. souleyetii, from southwestern Ecuador's El Oro and Loja provinces into northwestern Peru as far as the Department of Lambayeque

The streak-headed woodcreeper inhabits a variety of wooded landscapes, most of them semi-open to open. These include deciduous and somewhat humid forest, gallery forest, secondary forest, plantations, the edges of humid forest, and open areas with scattered trees. It also locally occurs in mangrove and in arid scrublands. In elevation it reaches 1,500 m (4,900 ft) in Mexico, 1,850 m (6,100 ft) in northern Central America, 1,500 m (4,900 ft) in Costa Rica (though uncommon above 900 m (3,000 ft)), 1,500 m (4,900 ft) in Colombia, and 1,600 m (5,200 ft) in Venezuela. In Ecuador it mostly occurs below 800 m (2,600 ft) but reaches 1,800 m (5,900 ft) locally in Loja Province.

== Behavior ==
=== Movement ===
The streak-headed woodcreeper is a year-round resident throughout its range.

=== Feeding ===
The streak-headed woodcreeper's diet is mostly non-flying arthropods, and other invertebrates such as crabs and small fruits are minor components. It forages mostly singly or in pairs, at all levels of the forest, hitching up trunks and branches. It is not known to join mixed-species feeding flocks. It captures prey by flaking bark and probing into crevices and moss clumps.

=== Breeding ===
The streak-headed woodcreeper forms pairs during the breeding season but is generally solitary outside it. Its breeding season varies across its range, for example in June and July in Mexico and April to October in Colombia. It usually nests in tree cavities, either natural or excavated by a woodpecker, and pads the bottom with wood chips and bark pieces. It occasionally use nest boxes. Nests in trees are typically 3 to 25 m (10 to 80 ft) above the ground. The clutch size is two eggs. The incubation period is about 15 days; the time to fledging is not known. Both parents incubate the clutch and provision nestlings.

=== Vocalization ===
The streak-headed woodcreeper's song has been described as "a simple, descending, clear trill, soft and melodious", "a clear musical descending trill that lasts 1.5-3 seconds", "a high-pitched, thin, flat trill, p'e'e'e'e'e'e'e'eeeaaa, rapid and descending throughout, ca 2-2.5 sec.", and as "a loud, ringing, rapid, descending series of puttering notes: pee'i'i'i'i'i'i'i'i'i'i'i'i'i'i'i'i'ew". Its calls include "a harsher, more rattling, shorter trill", "a soft plaintive pyuu", and "a loud, rapidly quavering, descending pee'i'i'u".

== Status ==
The IUCN has assessed the streak-headed woodcreeper as being of Least Concern. It has a large range and an estimated population of at least 500,000 mature individuals, though the latter is believed to be decreasing. No immediate threats have been identified. It is considered common through most of its range though less so at higher elevations. It "tolerates secondary forest, forest edge and open habitats. As these habitats are often a result of human-altered environments, this species is less sensitive to human activity than other woodcreepers."
