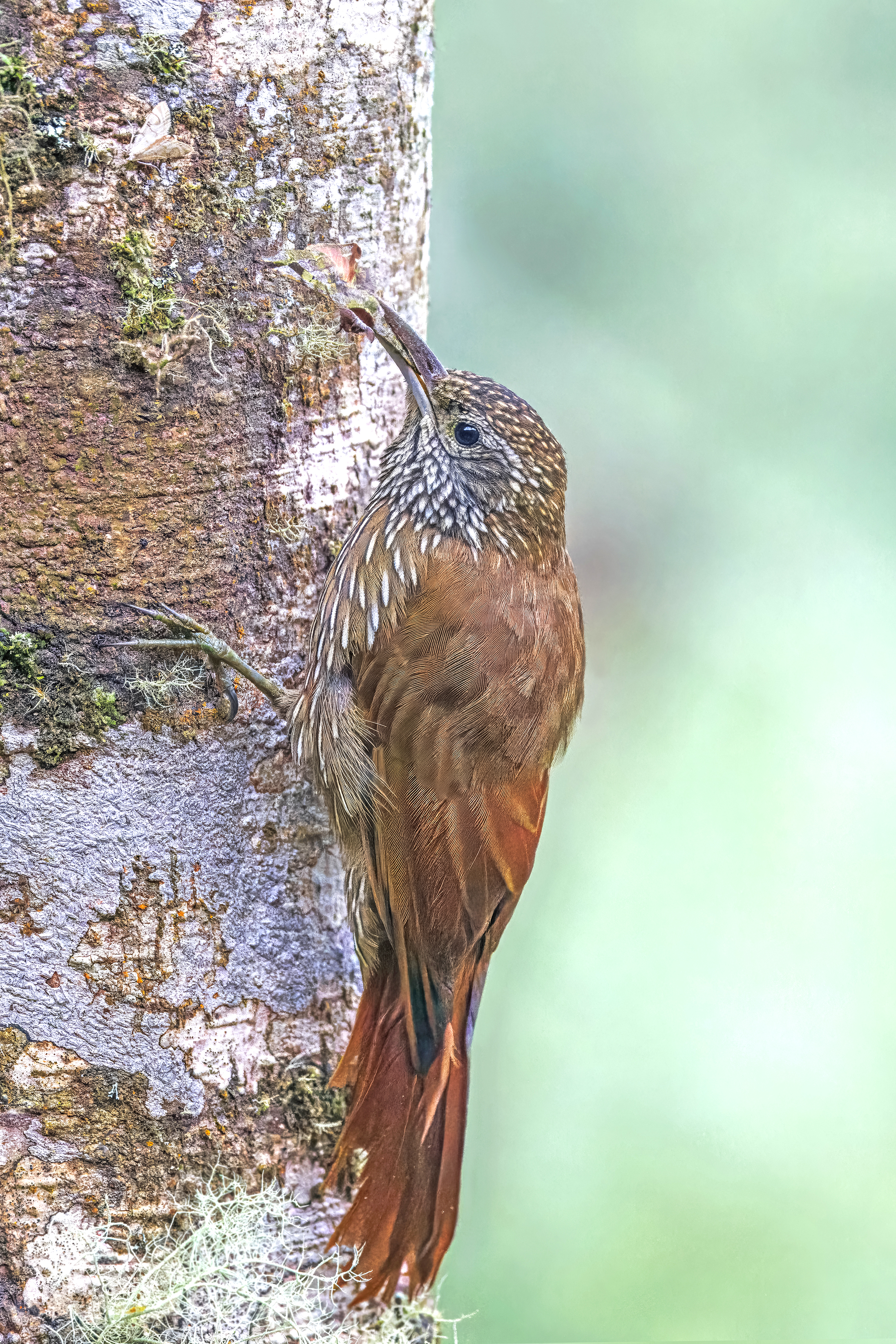
- L. l. aequatorialis eating a moth in Ecuador
- Lepidocolaptes lacrymiger - Montane Woodcreeper (song)

Conservation status
- Least Concern (IUCN 3.1)

Scientific classification
- Kingdom: Animalia
- Phylum: Chordata
- Class: Aves
- Order: Passeriformes
- Family: Furnariidae
- Genus: Lepidocolaptes
- Species: L. lacrymiger

Binomial name
- Lepidocolaptes lacrymiger (Lafresnaye, 1849)

= Montane woodcreeper =

Species of bird

The montane woodcreeper (Lepidocolaptes lacrymiger) is a perching bird species in the subfamily Dendrocolaptinae of the ovenbird family Furnariidae. It is found in Bolivia, Colombia, Ecuador, Peru, and Venezuela.

== Taxonomy and systematics ==
The montane woodcreeper was formerly considered conspecific with the spot-crowned woodcreeper (L. affinis) but they were split in the early 2000s.

The montane woodcreeper has these nine subspecies:

- Lepidocolaptes lacrymiger sanctaemartae (Chapman, 1912)
- Lepidocolaptes lacrymiger sneiderni Meyer de Schauensee, 1945
- Lepidocolaptes lacrymiger lacrymiger (Lafresnaye, 1849)
- Lepidocolaptes lacrymiger lafresnayi (Cabanis & Heine, 1860)
- Lepidocolaptes lacrymiger aequatorialis (Ménégaux, 1912)
- Lepidocolaptes lacrymiger frigidus Meyer de Schauensee, 1951
- Lepidocolaptes lacrymiger warscewiczi (Cabanis & Heine, 1860)
- Lepidocolaptes lacrymiger carabayae Hellmayr, 1920
- Lepidocolaptes lacrymiger bolivianus (Chapman, 1919)
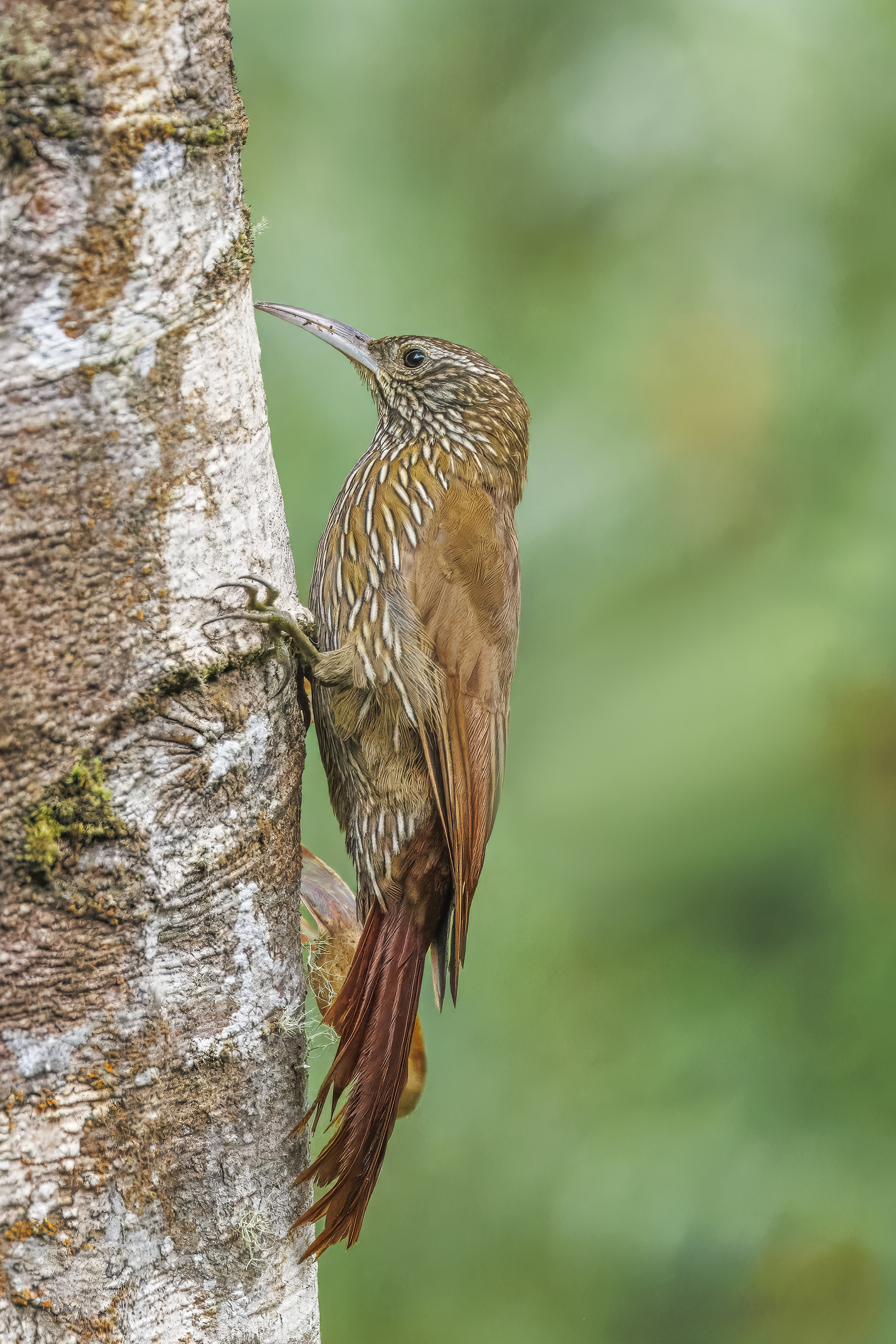
L. l. aequatorialis, Ecuador

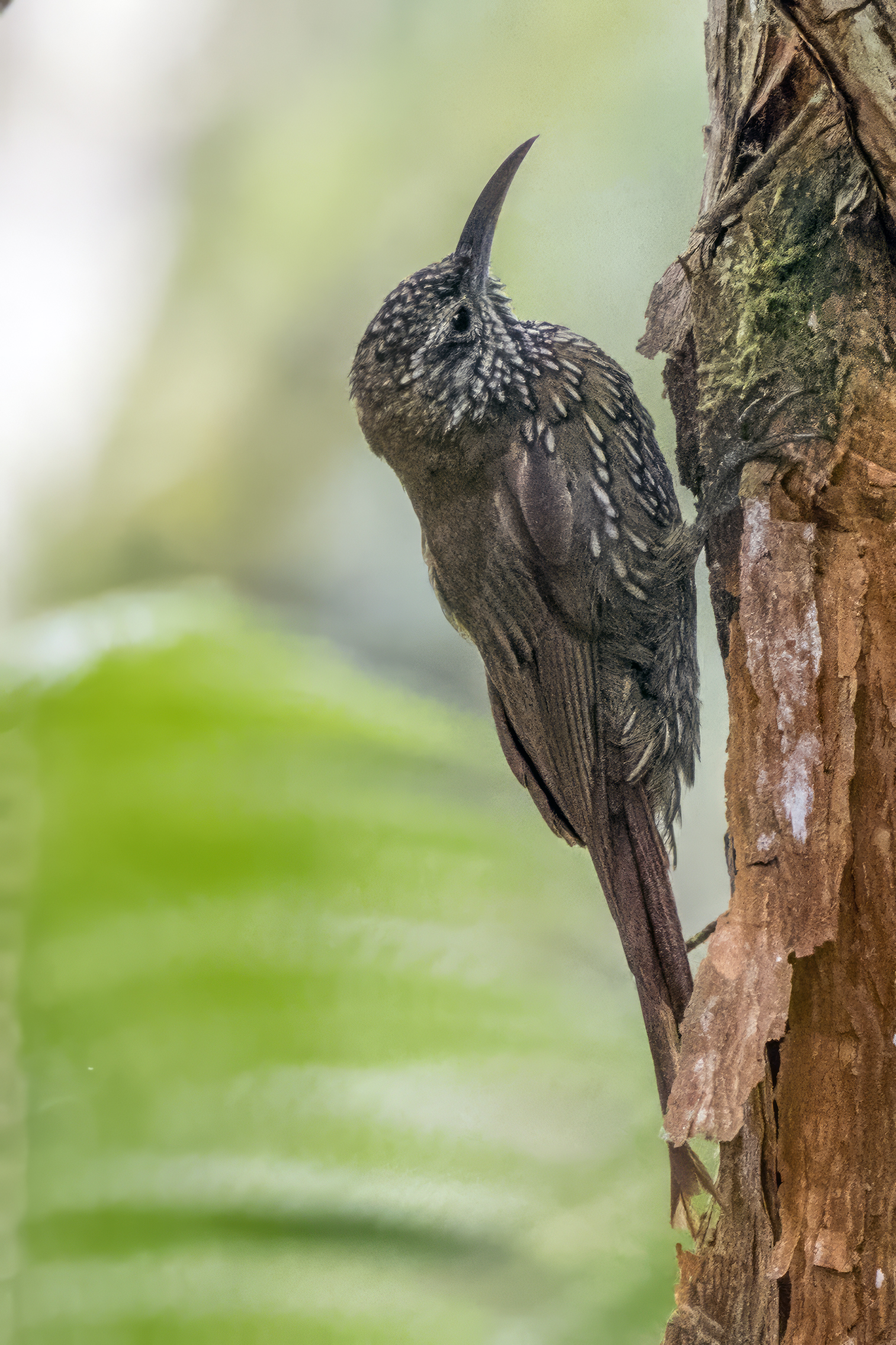
L. l. sneiderni, Colombia

== Description ==
The montane woodcreeper is 19 to 19.5 cm (7.5 to 7.7 in) long; males weigh 31 to 35 g (1.1 to 1.2 oz) and females 29.5 to 33 g (1.0 to 1.2 oz). It is a smallish to medium-sized woodcreeper with a slim, slightly decurved bill. The sexes have the same plumage. Adults of the nominate subspecies L. l. lacrymiger have a markedly streaked face and neck with a whitish supercilium that is often broken. Their crown and nape are dusky brown with conspicuous whitish buff spots with black tips; the spots become streaks on the nape. Their back and wing coverts are rufous-brown and their rump, wings, and tail rufous-chestnut. Their underparts are olive-brown with long, wide, black-edged and tipped buffy streaks . Their iris is dark brown and their legs and feet olive-gray to dark horn. Their maxilla is blackish to dusky gray or dark horn and the mandible pale gray to whitish. Juveniles have less distinct borders on the underside streaks, and a shorter and darker bill.

The other subspecies of the montane woodcreeper differ from the nominate and each other thus:

- L. l. sanctaemartae, paler throat than nominate with dimmer markings, grayer underparts with wider, whiter, streaks edged but not tipped with black
- L. l. sneiderni, darker than nominate, more olive-gray overall; fewer, smaller, and shorter underparts streaks
- L. l. lafresnayi, more olive-brown overall than nominate, paler underparts, no rufescent tones
- L. l. warscewiczi, darker and more rufescent overall than nominate, streaks on back, deeper buff underparts streaks edged but not tipped black
- L. l. aequatorialis, similar to warscewiczi but slightly more rufescent underparts, buffier throat, and wider underparts streaks
- L. l. frigidus, similar to aequatorialis with more olivaceous upperparts and darker bill
- L. l. carabayae, similar to warscewiczi but overall slightly darker, more olive underparts with narrower streaks, shorter and more curved bill with whitish maxilla
- L. l. bolivianus, compared to carabayae buffier throat, paler and less rufescent upperparts, more olivaceous underparts with wider whiter streaks

== Distribution and habitat ==
The subspecies of the montane woodcreeper are found thus:

- L. l. sanctaemartae, northern Colombia's Santa Marta region
- L. l. sneiderni, Colombia's Western and Central Andes, the western slope of the Eastern Andes, and the river valleys between them
- L. l. lacrymiger, eastern slope of Colombia's Eastern Andes and western Venezuela's Cordillera de Mérida and Serranía del Perijá
- L. l. lafresnayi, the Venezuelan Coastal Range
- L. l. aequatorialis, western slope of the Andes in southwestern Colombia's Nariño Department south on both slopes of the Andes in Ecuador; to Loja Province on the west and less far south on the east
- L. l. frigidus, eastern slope of the Andes in Nariño Department
- L. l. warscewiczi, eastern slope of the Andes of extreme southeastern Ecuador south into Peru as far as the Department of Junín
- L. l. carabayae, eastern slope of the Andes in the southeastern Peruvian departments of Cuzco and Puno
- L. l. bolivianus, eastern slope of the Andes of northwestern and central Bolivia

The population of the montane woodcreeper on the western slope of the Andes in northwestern Peru could be either L. l. aequatorialis or L. l. warscewiczi.

The montane woodcreeper inhabits a variety of forested landscapes, mostly in mid- to upper elevations. It favors montane evergreen forest and cloudforest, and also occurs in somewhat open woodland, montane deciduous forest, and stunted forest near treeline. It is found in the interior of primary forest but is thought to be more common at its edges and in mature secondary forest. It also occurs in clearings and pastures with trees. In elevation it generally ranges between 1,750 and 3,000 m (5,700 and 9,800 ft) but is occasionally found as low as 900 m (3,000 ft) in Venezuela. In Colombia it ranges between 1,700 and 3,500 m (5,600 and 11,500 ft) and in Ecuador between 1,500 and 3,000 m (4,900 and 9,800 ft).

== Behavior ==
=== Movement ===
The montane woodcreeper is a year-round resident in most of its range; in Venezuela there is some movement to lower elevations in the rainy season.

=== Feeding ===
The montane woodcreeper's diet is not known in detail but is primarily arthropods. It typically forages singly or in pairs and regularly joins mixed-species feeding flocks. It is not known to follow army ant swarms. It hitches up trunks and along the underside of branches, typically from the forest's midlevel to the subcanopy and seldom near the ground. It captures prey by gleaning from surfaces and by probing bark crevices, epiphytes, and moss.

=== Breeding ===
The montane woodcreeper's breeding seasons vary geographically but generally fall within April to August. It nests in a cavity in a tree or stump, either natural or excavated by a woodpecker. One nest contained three eggs. The incubation period and time to fledging are not known. Pairs are thought to remain together year-round, and both sexes are assumed to care for young.

=== Vocalization ===
The montane woodcreeper is not highly vocal. Its song is "a 2·5 second series of 10–15 high-pitched whistles that accelerates and descends: 'tsip, tsip, tsip, ts-ts-tseeeéu, tseeu, tseu-tseu-tseu-tseu' or 'tseu, tseu, tsip-tsip, tsee-tsee-tsee-tsee-tsee' ". It also makes a "series of 3 reedy squeaks", a "double-noted cry", and a "rattle with introductory 'ah' ".

== Status ==
The IUCN has assessed the montane woodcreeper as being of Least Concern. It has a large range, and though its population size is not known it is believed to be stable. No immediate threats have been identified. It is considered uncommon to fairly common, and locally common, but rare in northern Bolivian dry forest. "This species' ability to exist in second-growth and edge environments suggests that it is only moderately sensitive to human disturbance."
