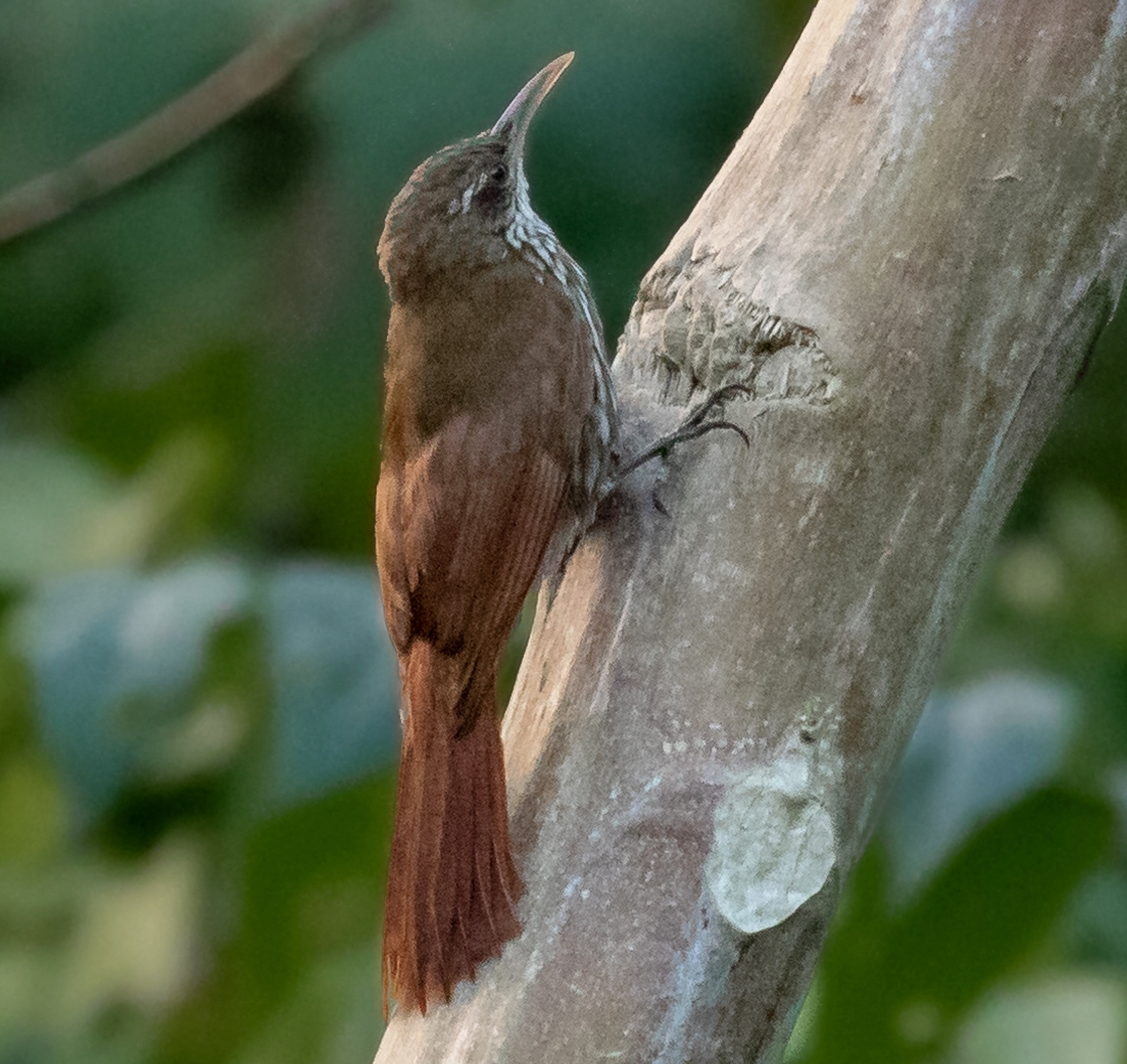

Conservation status
- Least Concern (IUCN 3.1)

Scientific classification
- Kingdom: Animalia
- Phylum: Chordata
- Class: Aves
- Order: Passeriformes
- Family: Furnariidae
- Genus: Lepidocolaptes
- Species: L. fuscicapillus

Binomial name
- Lepidocolaptes fuscicapillus (Pelzeln, 1868)

= Dusky-capped woodcreeper =

Rondonia woodcreeper

Species of bird

The dusky-capped woodcreeper (Lepidocolaptes fuscicapillus) is a species of bird in the subfamily Dendrocolaptinae of the ovenbird family Furnariidae. It is found in Bolivia and Brazil.

== Taxonomy and systematics ==
Until the 2010s what is now the dusky-capped woodcreeper was considered a subspecies of Lepidocolaptes albolineatus, which was then called the lineated woodcreeper. Starting at that time all but the lineated's nominate subspecies were split from it, eventually resulting in the dusky-capped woodcreeper, the Duida woodcreeper (L. duidae), the Inambari woodcreeper (L. fatimalimae), and a monotypic L. albolineatus which was renamed the Guianan woodcreeper. In the initial split, two subspecies of the lineated woodcreeper, L. a. fuscicapillus and L. a. layardi, were each accorded species status as the "Rondonia" and "Layard's" woodcreepers respectively. In 2020 the two were lumped as the two subspecies of the current dusky-capped woodcreeper.

== Description ==
The dusky-capped woodcreeper weighs about 22 to 28 g (0.78 to 0.99 oz). It is a smallish, slim, woodcreeper with a slim decurved bill. The sexes have the same plumage. Adults' crown and nape are grayish brown becoming warm brown on the back. Their wings, uppertail coverts, rump, and tail are brown with a rufous tinge. Their chin and throat are whitish to buffy-white. Their underparts are brown with blackish-edged whitish streaks. Their underwing coverts are rufous-brown. Their iris is dark brown, their bill pale brown with a pinkish tinge and a darker tip on the mandible, and the legs and feet usually blackish slate or grayish. Juveniles are similar to adults with the largest difference being their shorter, straighter, and yellowish bill.

== Distribution and habitat ==
The nominate subspecies L. f. fuscicapillus of the dusky-capped woodcreeper is found in the Amazon Basin of northeastern Bolivia and western Brazil, south of the Amazon River in the interfluve of the Madeira and Tapajós rivers. Subspecies L. f. layardi is found south of the Amazon east of the Tapajós. The species mostly inhabits terra firme and floodplain forest. It favors the interior and edges of tall primary forest and mature secondary forest. It is found less often in savanna, and is found only rarely in young secondary forest. It elevation it seldom exceeds 700 m (2,300 ft).

== Behavior ==
=== Movement ===
The dusky-capped woodcreeper is a year-round resident throughout its range.

=== Feeding ===
The dusky-capped woodcreeper's diet is primarily arthropods. It usually forages singly or in pairs, and often joins mixed-species feeding flocks. It hitches along branches, often on their underside, mostly in the forest's sub-canopy and canopy, occasionally in the middle levels, and rarely if ever in the understory. It takes most of its prey from bark, by picking, probing, and prying off flakes. It also sometimes probes vegetation like epiphytes but only infrequently sallies after airborne prey.

=== Breeding ===
The dusky-capped woodcreeper is thought to breed between July and November. Nothing else is known about the species' breeding biology. It is assumed to nest in tree cavities lined with bark chips or leaves like the other species of genus Lepidocolaptes.

=== Vocalization ===
The dusky-capped woodcreeper's song is a "series of 3–9 well-spaced sharp whistles, described as peeer peeer peeer peeer peeeur, that are given either at a stable or slightly descending pitch". Its principle call is a "loud and clear descending rattle initiated by a steep rising Kwirrrr!".

== Status ==
The IUCN has assessed the dusky-capped woodcreeper as being of Least Concern. It has a large range, but its population size is not known and is believed to be decreasing. No immediate threats have been identified. "Considering that the Dusky-capped Woodcreeper is a primary forest specialist, the loss and degradation of the Amazonian Forest is a significant threat to its persistence."
