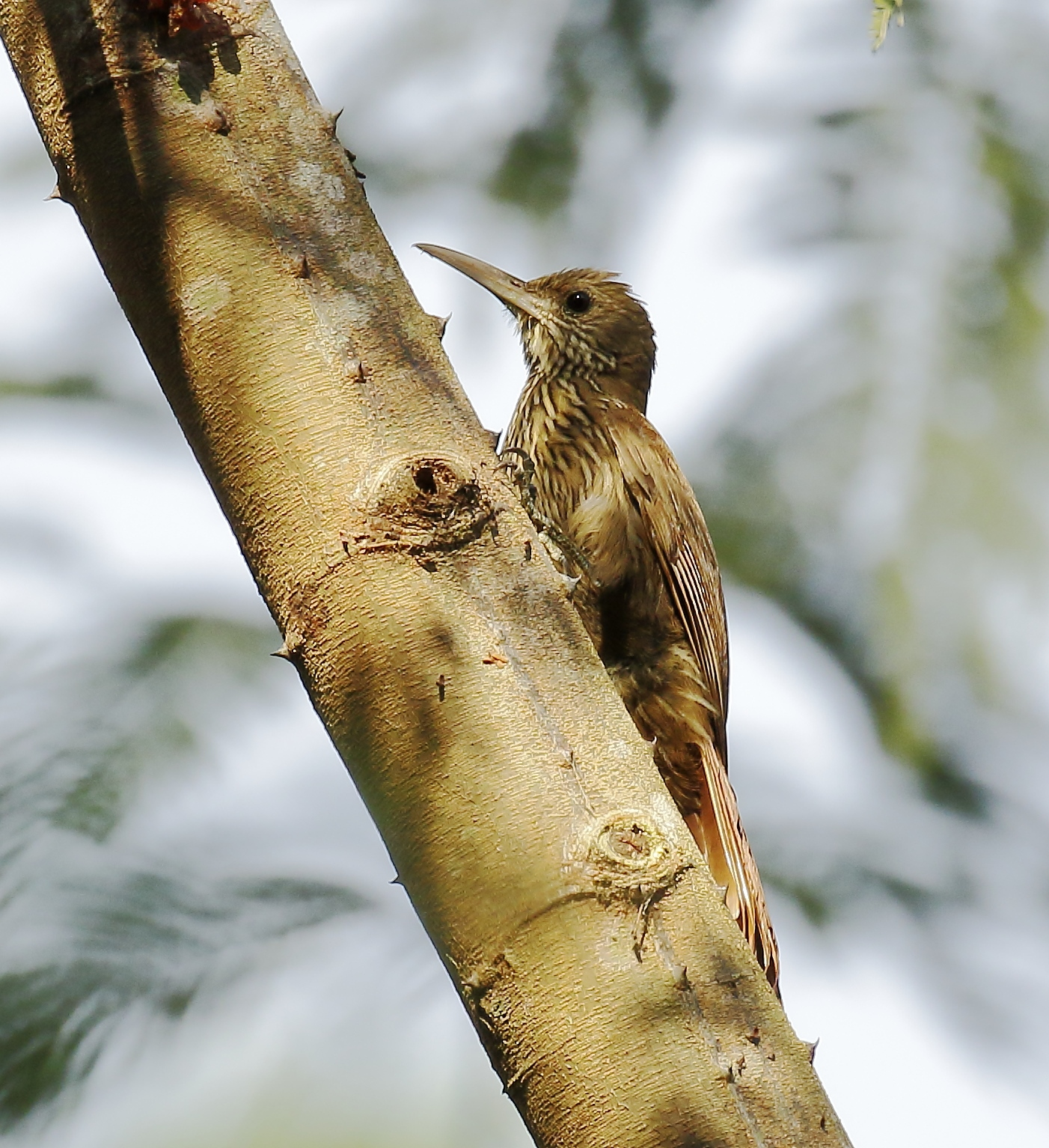

Conservation status
- Least Concern (IUCN 3.1)

Scientific classification
- Kingdom: Animalia
- Phylum: Chordata
- Class: Aves
- Order: Passeriformes
- Family: Furnariidae
- Genus: Lepidocolaptes
- Species: L. fatimalimae

Binomial name
- Lepidocolaptes fatimalimae Rodrigues et al., 2013

= Inambari woodcreeper =

Species of bird

The Inambari woodcreeper (Lepidocolaptes fatimalimae) is a species of bird in the subfamily Dendrocolaptinae of the ovenbird family Furnariidae. It is found in Bolivia, Brazil, and Peru.

== Taxonomy and systematics ==
The Inambari woodcreeper was described in 2013 as part of the reevaluation of Lepidocolaptes albolineatus, which was then called the lineated woodcreeper. Starting in the early 2010s, all but the lineated's nominate subspecies were split from it, eventually resulting in recognition of the Inambari woodcreeper (which had not been known as a subspecies), the Duida woodcreeper (L. duidae), the dusky-capped woodcreeper (L. fuscicapillus), and a monotypic L. albolineatus which was renamed the Guianan woodcreeper.

The Inambari woodcreeper's specific epithet honors Fátima Lima, manager of bird collections at the Museu Paraense Emílio Goeldi.

The Inambari woodcreeper is monotypic.

== Description ==
The Inambari woodcreeper is 17 to 19 cm (6.7 to 7.5 in) long and weighs about 31 to 35 g (1.1 to 1.2 oz). It is a smallish, slim, woodcreeper with a slim decurved bill. The sexes have the same plumage. Adults' face, crown, and nape are dark russet-brown with few or no spots on the crown. Their back and wing coverts are dark russet-brown, and their rump, wings, and tail rufous-chestnut with dusky tips on the primaries. Their throat is plain buffy. Their breast and belly are grayish brown to olive-brown with bold, brownish-edged, buff to creamy white streaks. Juveniles have darker upperparts than adults, a grayer crown with some spots, and whiter, somewhat reduced, streaks on the underparts.

== Distribution and habitat ==
The Inambari woodcreeper is found in western Amazon Basin of eastern Peru, northern and central Bolivia, and western Brazil south of the Amazon River as far east as the Madeira River. It mostly inhabits terra firme and floodplain forest. It occurs less often in swamp forest and flooded várzea forest, and in shade coffee plantations in Peru. It favors the interior and edges of tall primary forest and mature secondary forest and is found only rarely in younger secondary forest. It elevation it seldom exceeds 1,000 m (3,300 ft) though it has reached 2,225 m (7,300 ft) in the Peruvian Andes.

== Behavior ==
=== Movement ===
The Inambari woodcreeper is believed to be a year-round resident throughout its range.

=== Feeding ===
The Inambari woodcreeper's diet is primarily arthropods. It usually forages singly or in pairs, and often joins mixed-species feeding flocks. It hitches along branches, often on their underside, mostly in the forest's sub-canopy and canopy, occasionally in the middle levels, and rarely if ever in the understory. It takes most of its prey from bark, by picking, probing, and prying off flakes. It also sometimes probes vegetation like epiphytes but only infrequently sallies after airborne prey.

=== Breeding ===
Little is known about the Inambari woodcreeper's breeding biology. Its breeding season seems to include late July to early August. It nests in cavities in trees. One nest contained two eggs.

=== Vocalization ===
The Inambari woodcreeper's song differs from those of its former conspecifics; their songs were among the strongest evidence for their separation. Its song is "a soft trill comprising 16–37 notes (typically 26–33), like that of a becard (Pachyramphus) that trails off at end".

== Status ==
The IUCN has assessed the Inambari woodcreeper as being of Least Concern. It has a large range, and though its population size is not known it is believed to be stable. No immediate threats have been identified. Because it is primarily a canopy specialist it is not well known; it is thought to be uncommon to fairly common throughout its range. It is "[b]elieved to be dependent on forest, thus likely to be highly sensitive to habitat modification".
