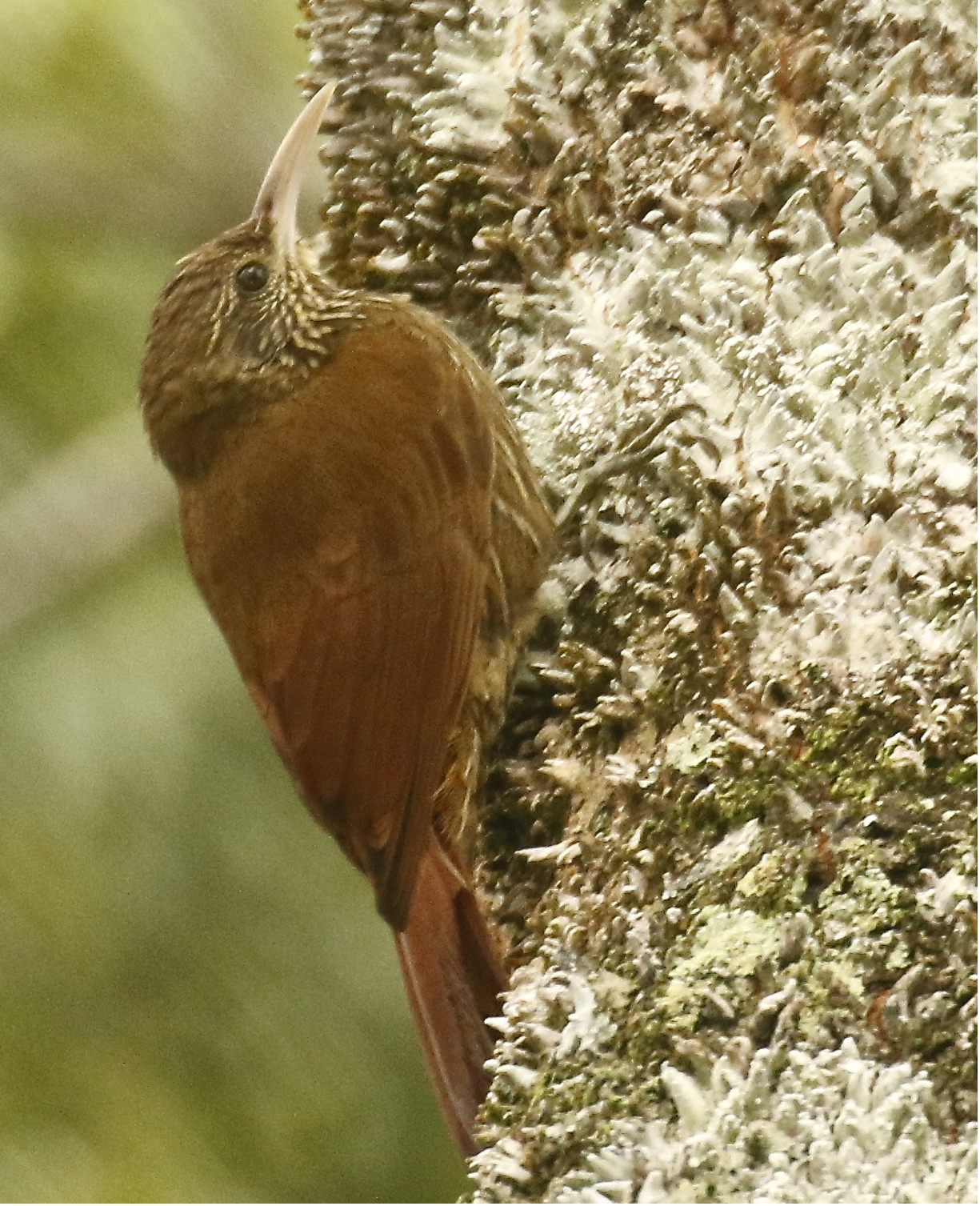

Conservation status
- Least Concern (IUCN 3.1)

Scientific classification
- Kingdom: Animalia
- Phylum: Chordata
- Class: Aves
- Order: Passeriformes
- Family: Furnariidae
- Genus: Lepidocolaptes
- Species: L. duidae

Binomial name
- Lepidocolaptes duidae Zimmer, 1934

= Duida woodcreeper =

Species of bird

The Duida woodcreeper (Lepidocolaptes duidae) is a species of bird in the subfamily Dendrocolaptinae of the ovenbird family Furnariidae. It is found in Brazil, Ecuador, Peru, Venezuela, and possibly Colombia.

== Taxonomy and systematics ==
Until the 2010s what is now the Duida woodcreeper was considered a subspecies of Lepidocolaptes albolineatus, which was then called the lineated woodcreeper. Starting at that time all but the lineated's nominate subspecies were split from it, eventually resulting in the Duida woodcreeper (L. duidae), the Inambari woodcreeper (L. fatimalimae), the dusky-capped woodcreeper (L. fuscicapillus), and a monotypic L. albolineatus which was renamed the Guianan woodcreeper.

The Duida woodcreeper is monotypic.

== Description ==
The Duida woodcreeper is 17 to 19 cm (6.7 to 7.5 in) long; males weigh 24 to 25 g (0.85 to 0.88 oz). It is a smallish, slim, woodcreeper with a slim decurved bill. The sexes have the same plumage. Adults' face, crown, and nape are dusky brown with few or no spots on the crown. Their back and wing coverts are dark russet-brown, and their rump, wings, and tail rufous-chestnut with blackish brown tips on the primaries. Their throat is plain buffy. Their breast and belly are grayish brown to olive-brown with bold, blackish-edged, pale buff to creamy white streaks. Juveniles have darker upperparts than adults, a grayer crown with some spots, and whiter, somewhat reduced, streaks on the underparts.

== Distribution and habitat ==
The Duida woodcreeper is found in the northwestern Amazon Basin of southern Venezuela, eastern Ecuador, northeastern Peru, and Brazil north of the Rio Solimões (upper Amazon River) and west of the Rio Negro. Worldwide taxonomic systems also include eastern Colombia in its range, but the South American Classification Committee of the American Ornithological Society lists it as hypothetical there, because all of the reports are undocumented sight records. The Duida woodcreeper mostly inhabits terra firme and floodplain forest. It occurs less often in swamp forest and flooded várzea forest. It favors the interior and edges of tall primary forest and mature secondary forest and is found only rarely in younger secondary forest. It elevation it seldom exceeds 1,000 m (3,300 ft).

== Behavior ==
=== Movement ===
The Duida woodcreeper is believed to be a year-round resident throughout its range.

=== Feeding ===
The Duida woodcreeper's diet is primarily arthropods. It usually forages singly or in pairs, and often joins mixed-species feeding flocks. It hitches along branches, often on their underside, mostly in the forest's sub-canopy and canopy, occasionally in the middle levels, and rarely if ever in the understory. It takes most of its prey from bark, by picking, probing, and prying off flakes. It also sometimes probes vegetation like epiphytes but only infrequently sallies after airborne prey.

=== Breeding ===
Almost nothing is known about the Duida woodcreeper's breeding biology. There is evidence both for and against its breeding season including April.

=== Vocalization ===
The Duida woodcreeper's song differs from those of its former conspecifics; their songs were among the strongest evidence for their separation. The Duida woodcreeper sings "8–12 notes in 2·5 seconds with a somewhat bouncing, thin and high-pitched quality, described as 'peer, peer, peer, pi, pi, pi, pi, pi, pi, pu, pu, peu' or 'pe-pee-pee-pee-peer-peer-peer-pear' ".

== Status ==
The IUCN has assessed the Duida woodcreeper as being of Least Concern. It has a large range, but its population size is not known and is believed to be decreasing. No immediate threats have been identified. Because it is primarily a canopy specialist it is not well known; it is thought to be uncommon to fairly common throughout its range. It is "[b]elieved to be dependent on forest, thus likely to be highly sensitive to habitat modification".
