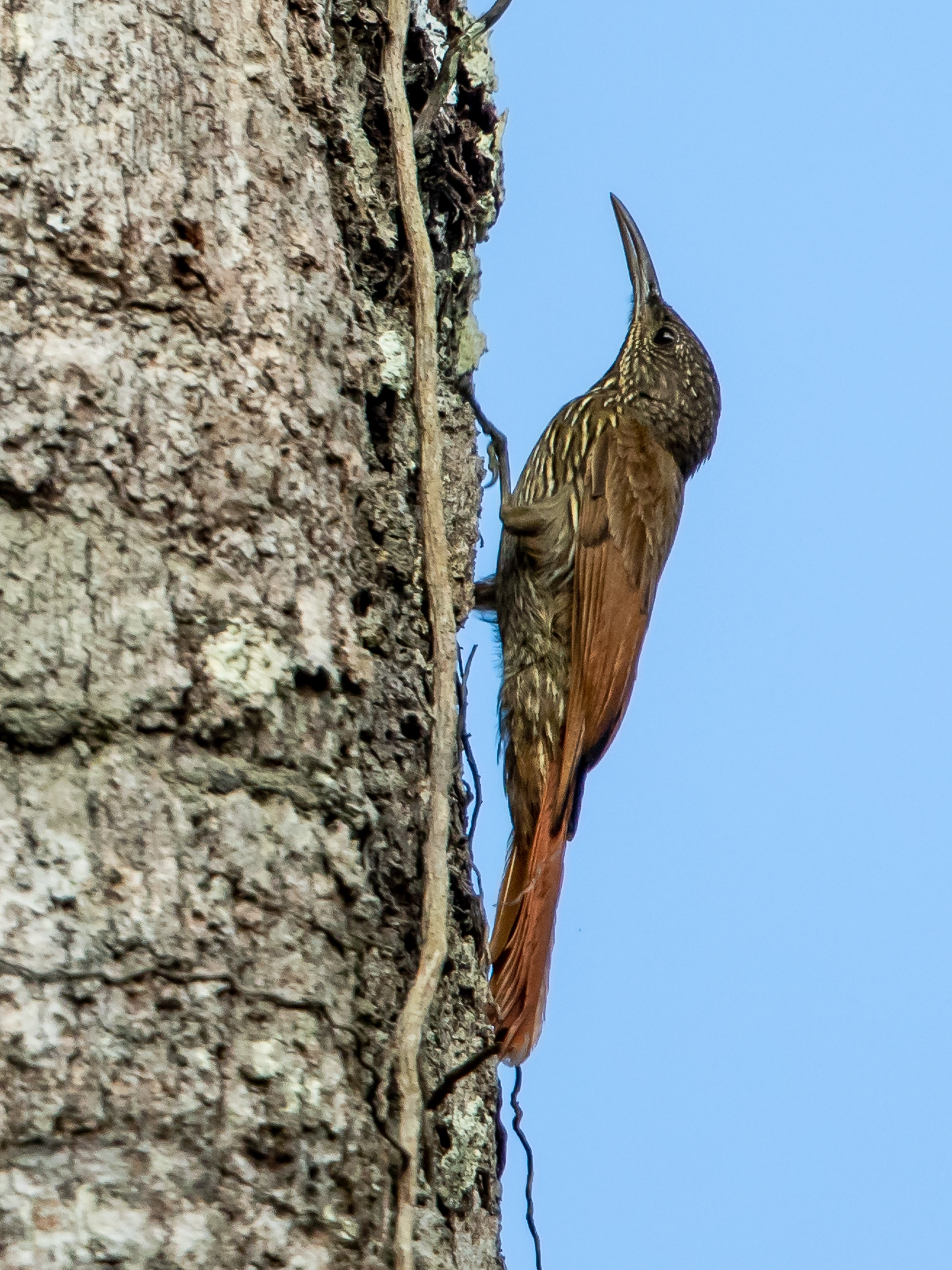

Conservation status
- Least Concern (IUCN 3.1)

Scientific classification
- Kingdom: Animalia
- Phylum: Chordata
- Class: Aves
- Order: Passeriformes
- Family: Furnariidae
- Genus: Lepidocolaptes
- Species: L. albolineatus

Binomial name
- Lepidocolaptes albolineatus (Lafresnaye, 1846)

= Guianan woodcreeper =

Species of bird

The Guianan woodcreeper (Lepidocolaptes albolineatus) or lineated woodcreeper is a species of bird in the subfamily Dendrocolaptinae of the ovenbird family Furnariidae. It is found in Brazil, French Guiana, Guyana, Suriname, and Venezuela.

== Taxonomy and systematics ==
Until the 2010s what is now the Guianan woodcreeper was known as the lineated woodcreeper and had five subspecies assigned to it. Starting at that time all but its nominate subspecies were split from it, eventually resulting in a monotypic Guianan woodcreeper, the Duida woodcreeper (L. duidae), the Inambari woodcreeper (L. fatimalimae), and the dusky-capped woodcreeper (L. fuscicapillus).

== Description ==
The Guianan woodcreeper is 17 to 19 cm (6.7 to 7.5 in) long; males weigh 19 to 24 g (0.67 to 0.85 oz) and females 18 to 20.5 g (0.63 to 0.72 oz). It is a smallish woodcreeper with a slim decurved bill. The sexes have the same plumage. Adults' face, crown, and nape are dusky brown with fine buff spots on the crown that are sparser on the nape and absent from the back. Their back and wing coverts are dark russet-brown, and their rump, wings, and tail rufous-chestnut with blackish brown tips on the primaries. Their throat is plain buffy. Their breast and belly are grayish brown to olive-brown with bold, blackish-edged, pale buff to creamy white streaks. Their undertail coverts are cinnamon-brown and their underwing coverts are cinnamon to ochraceous. Their iris is dark brown to chestnut and their legs and feet brown or gray to pea-green. Their bill's maxilla has a blackish or brown to dark horn-gray base and a pale horn to yellowish end, and their mandible is whitish or pale gray to pinkish. Juveniles have darker upperparts than adults, a grayer crown with more obvious spots, and whiter, somewhat reduced, streaks on the underparts.

== Distribution and habitat ==
The Guianan woodcreeper is found in northern Amazonia in the eastern Venezuelan states of Delta Amacuro and Bolívar, the Guianas, and northern Brazil north of the Amazon River from the Rio Negro east to the Atlantic ocean. It mostly inhabits terra firme and floodplain forest. It occurs less often in swamp forest, flooded várzea forest, and savanna, and in a few places semi-deciduous and gallery forest. It favors the interior and edges of tall primary forest and mature secondary forest and is found only rarely in younger secondary forest. In elevation it mostly ranges below 1,000 m (3,300 ft) but is occasionally found as high as 1,800 m (5,900 ft) in Venezuela.

== Behavior ==
=== Movement ===
The Guianan woodcreeper is believed to be a year-round resident throughout its range.

=== Feeding ===
The Guianan woodcreeper's diet is primarily arthropods. It usually forages singly or in pairs, and often joins mixed-species feeding flocks. It hitches along branches, often on their underside, mostly in the forest's sub-canopy and canopy, occasionally in the middle levels, and rarely if ever in the understory. It takes most of its prey from bark, by picking, probing, and prying off flakes. It also sometimes probes vegetation like epiphytes but only infrequently sallies after airborne prey.

=== Breeding ===
The Guianan woodcreeper breeds during the Guianan dry season, roughly July to September. Only one nest is known; it was in a cavity near the top of a dead stump and was lined with bark chips. It fledged at least two young. Nothing else is known about the species' breeding biology.

=== Vocalization ===
The Guianan woodcreeper's song is "a soft trill...that rises and falls in pitch, and trails off at end, comprising a series of 20–40 notes and lasts c. 2–3 seconds".

== Status ==
The IUCN has assessed the Guianan woodcreeper as being of Least Concern. It has a large range, but its population size is not known and is believed to be decreasing. No immediate threats have been identified. Because it is primarily a canopy specialist it is not well known; it is thought to be uncommon to fairly common throughout its range. It is "[b]elieved to be dependent on forest, thus likely to be highly sensitive to habitat modification".
