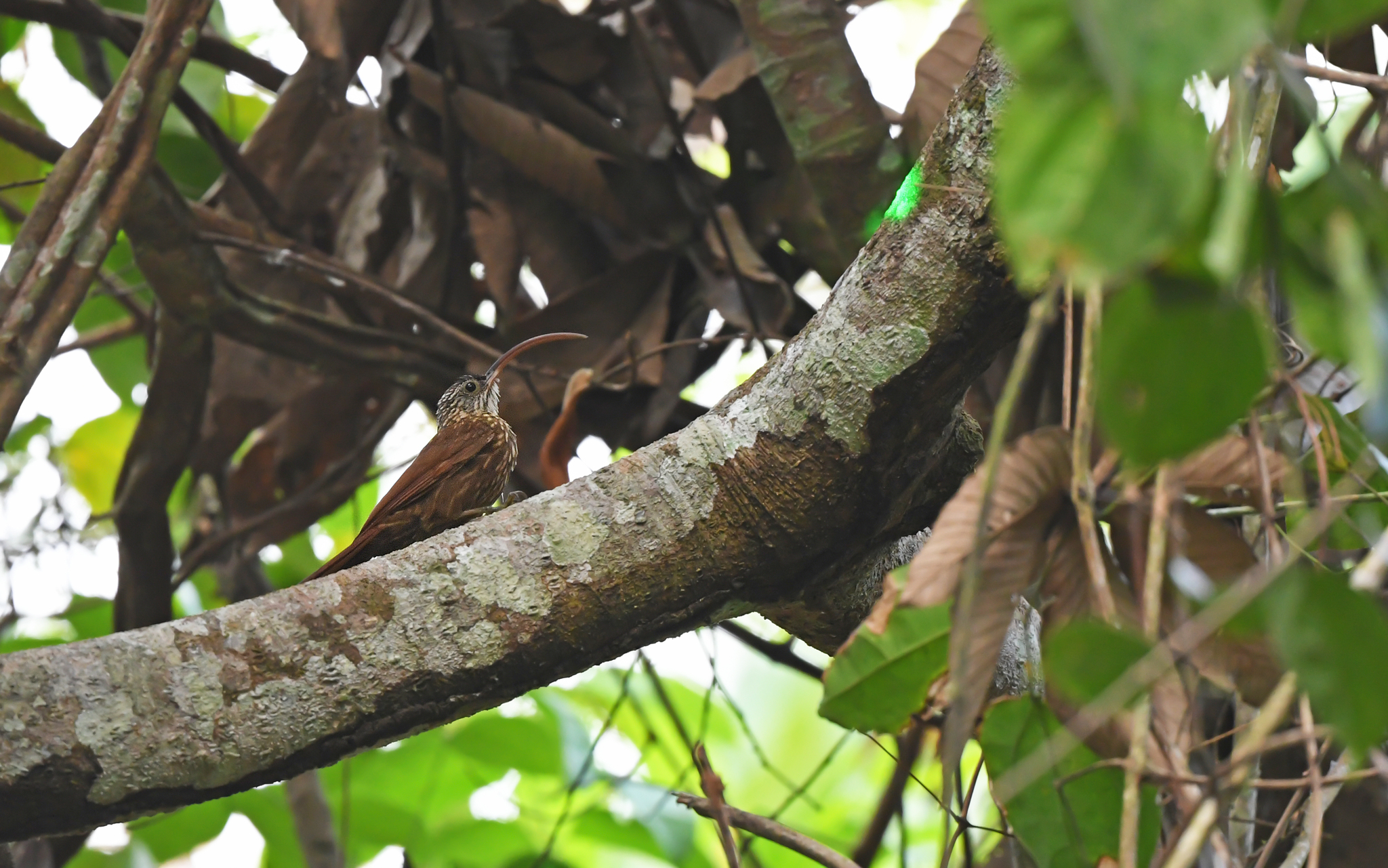

Conservation status
- Near Threatened (IUCN 3.1)

Scientific classification
- Kingdom: Animalia
- Phylum: Chordata
- Class: Aves
- Order: Passeriformes
- Family: Furnariidae
- Genus: Campylorhamphus
- Species: C. multostriatus

Binomial name
- Campylorhamphus multostriatus (Snethlage, E, 1907)

= Xingu scythebill =

Species of bird found in the Amazon

The Xingu scythebill (Campylorhamphus multostriatus) is a species of bird in the subfamily Dendrocolaptinae of the ovenbird family Furnariidae. It is endemic to Brazil.

== Taxonomy and systematics ==
The Xingu scythebill was long considered conspecific with the curve-billed scythebill (C. procurvoides), which at the time also included what is now the Tapajos scythebill (C. probatus). By the early 2010s BirdLife International's Handbook of the Birds of the World (HBW) had separated it as this species. In July 2023 the International Ornithological Committee (IOC) adopted the split and in October 2023 the Clements taxonomy followed suit.

The South American Classification Committee of the American Ornithological Society retains this taxon within the curve-billed scythebill.

The Xingu scythebill is monotypic: No subspecies are recognized.

== Description ==
The Xingu scythebill is 22.5 to 25 cm (8.9 to 9.8 in) long and weighs about 38 g (1.3 oz). It is a slim, medium-sized woodcreeper with a very long, slim, dramatically decurved bill. The sexes have the same plumage. Adults have a blackish head. Their back and wing coverts are dark rufous-brown with wide lighter streaks that have black edges. Their rump and tail are dark chestnut. Their throat is plain whitish. Their underparts are brown with wide buffy streaks that have indistinct darker borders on the breast that don't continue onto the belly. Their iris is dark brown to chestnut and their bill dark brown to reddish with a paler mandible.

== Distribution and habitat ==
The Xingu scythebill is found in eastern Amazonian Brazil south of the Amazon between the Xingu and Tocantins rivers and south into Mato Grosso state. The species inhabits humid evergreen forest. It greatly favors terra firme but occasionally occurs in floodplain and seasonally flooded forest. It often occurs in bamboo thickets or vine-rich areas. In all forest types the species favors the interior though it does visit the forest edges. In elevation it mostly occurs below 500 m (1,600 ft) but locally reaches 800 m (2,600 ft).

== Behavior ==
=== Movement ===
The Xingu scythebill is assumed to be a year-round resident throughout its range.

=== Feeding ===
Almost nothing is known about the Xingu scythebill's diet or foraging behavior. However, it is assumed to be very similar to that of the curve-billed scythebill. That species' diet is mostly if not entirely arthropods. Single birds and pairs usually forage as part of mixed-species feeding flocks in the forest understory to its mid-level, though it will feed up to the subcanopy. It forages by gleaning and probing while hitching up and along trunks, branches, vines, and bamboo.

=== Breeding ===
Nothing is known about the Xingu scythebill's breeding biology.

=== Vocalization ===
The Xingu scythebill's song is described as "a series of c. 7–10 notes, with little variation in note length and pitch". It is somewhat similar to that of the curve-billed scythebill sensu stricto, which is described as "an accelerating series...of 7–9 somewhat melancholy whistles on even pitch or falling slightly...'weeee, weé, wee, we, we, wew' or 'kuweee, kuwee, kwee, wee-wee-we-we-we. ".

== Status ==
The IUCN originally assessed the Xingu scythebill as being of Least Concern but since 2021 has rated it Near Threatened. It has a somewhat limited range and its estimated population of between 13,000 and 41,000 mature individuals is believed to be decreasing "as a result of ongoing forest loss, degradation and fragmentation". The habitat losses are attributed to "construction of hydro-electric power plants, mineral extraction and conversion to agriculture and pastureland". Though it is fairly common at a few sites with large bamboo thickets, and is present in several protected areas, it is "[h]ighly sensitive to habitat modification, requiring nearly continuous forest".
