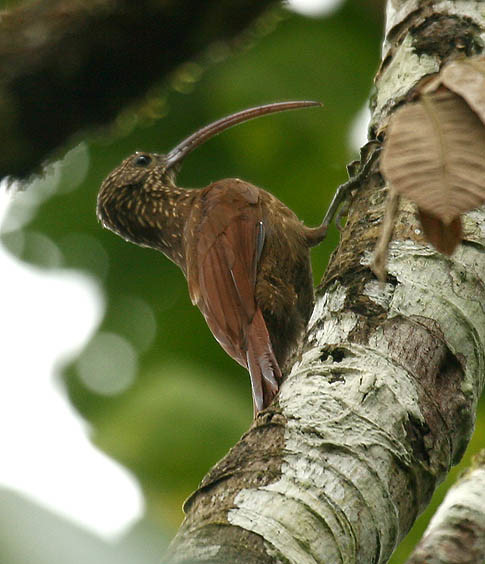

Conservation status
- Least Concern (IUCN 3.1)

Scientific classification
- Kingdom: Animalia
- Phylum: Chordata
- Class: Aves
- Order: Passeriformes
- Family: Furnariidae
- Genus: Campylorhamphus
- Species: C. trochilirostris

Binomial name
- Campylorhamphus trochilirostris (Lichtenstein, MHC, 1820)

= Red-billed scythebill =

Species of bird

The red-billed scythebill (Campylorhamphus trochilirostris) is a species of bird in the subfamily Dendrocolaptinae of the ovenbird family Furnariidae. It is found in Argentina, Bolivia, Brazil, Colombia, Ecuador, Panama, Paraguay, Peru, and Venezuela.

== Taxonomy and systematics ==
The red-billed scythebill has these 12 subspecies:

- C. t. brevipennis Griscom, 1932
- C. t. venezuelensis (Chapman, 1889)
- C. t. thoracicus (Sclater, PL, 1860)
- C. t. zarumillanus Stolzmann, 1926
- C. t. napensis Chapman, 1925
- C. t. notabilis Zimmer, JT, 1934
- C. t. snethlageae Zimmer, JT, 1934
- C. t. major Ridgway, 1911
- C. t. trochilirostris (Lichtenstein, MHC, 1820)
- C. t. devius Zimmer, JT, 1934
- C. t. lafresnayanus (d'Orbigny, 1846)
- C. t. hellmayri Laubmann, 1930

The red-billed scythebill and black-billed scythebill (C. falcularius) have at times been considered conspecific and also as sister species, but genetic data indicate neither is true. The red-billed and curve-billed scythebill (C. procurvoides) have also been suggested as sister species. Some of the subspecies are difficult to distinguish from each other. In addition, a small number of additional subspecies have been suggested to be split from existing ones.

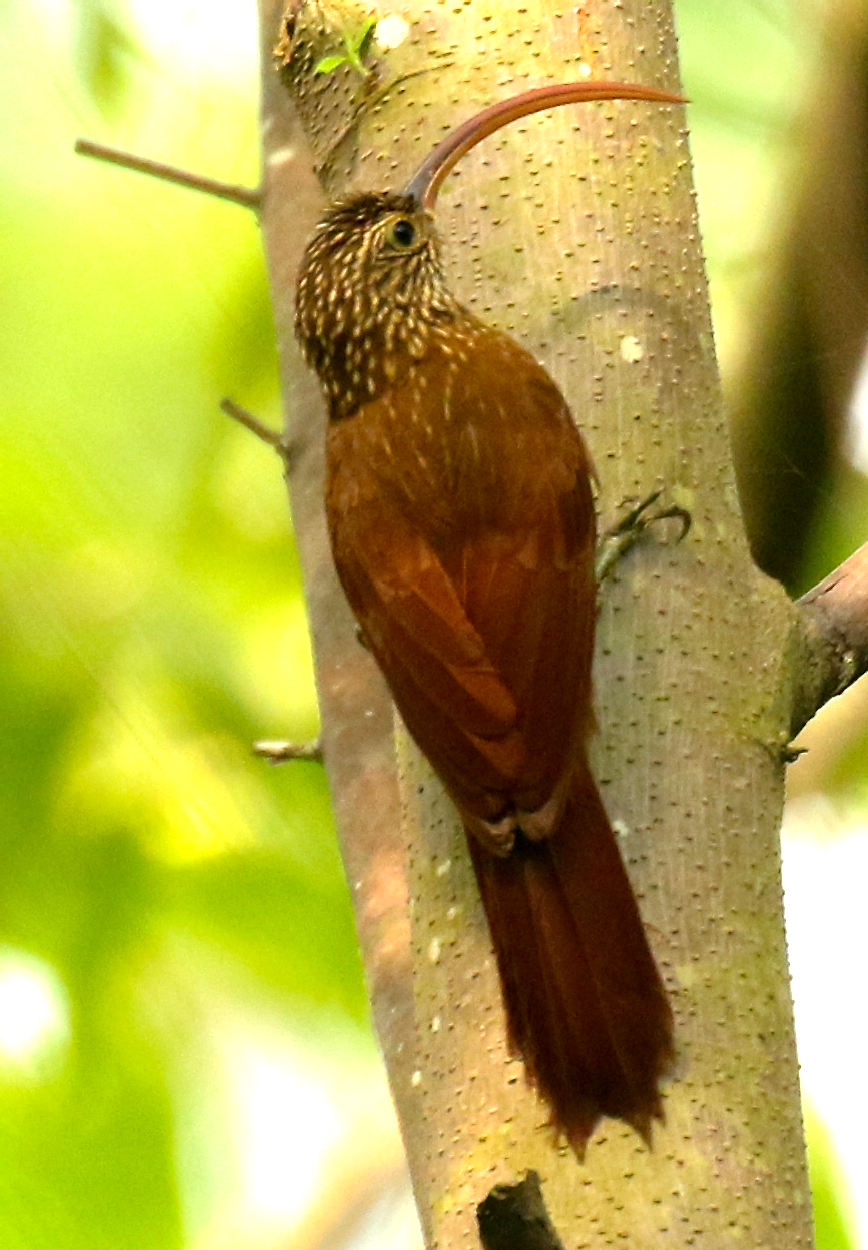
C. t. brevipennis at Darien, Panama

== Description ==
The red-billed scythebill is 22 to 28 cm (8.7 to 11 in) long and weighs 30 to 55 g (1.1 to 1.9 oz). It is a slim, medium-sized woodcreeper with a very long, slim, dramatically decurved bill. The sexes have the same plumage. Adults of the nominate subspecies C. t. trochilirostris have a thinly streaked face and neck with a weak supercilium. Their crown, nape, and back are reddish olive-brown, with the back being somewhat lighter. Their crown has longish whitish to ochraceous spots with narrow blackish edges; the spots narrow on the nape and become thin streaks on the upper back. Their rump is cinnamon-rufous that contrasts little with the back, their flight feathers are rufous-chestnut, and their tail is a slightly darker rufous-chestnut. Their wing coverts have wide reddish olive-brown edges and the tips of the primaries are dusky. Their throat and chin are white, the latter with thin brownish streaks. Their underparts are a slightly lighter brown than the back; their breast has buff streaks that narrow on the belly but don't continue onto the undertail coverts. Their underwing coverts are light cinnamon to ochraceous. Their iris is dark brown to hazel, their bill bright red or reddish brown (often with a dusky tip and base), and their legs and feet grayish olive to dull pea-green. Juveniles are less richly colored than adults, with less well defined and more ochraceous streaks, and a darker and much shorter bill.

The other subspecies of the red-billed scythebill differ from the nominate and each other thus:

- C. t. lafresnayanus, larger and longer billed than nominate, bright tawny-ochraceous underparts, back brighter rufous
- C. t. hellmayri, larger than lafresnayanus with a longer and more robust bill
- C. t. major, similar to lafresnayanus but overall paler, less rufous upperparts and more rufous wings and tail, bill like nominate's
- C. t. devius, similar to lafresnayanus but darker and with shorter bill, strong buff wash on throat
- C. t. snethlageae, similar to devius but darker underparts with a rufescent tinge, narrower crown streaks, whiter throat
- C. t. notabilis, similar to snethlageae but paler brown overall and with wider and whiter streaks
- C. t. thoracicus, bill like nominate's, blacker crown
- C. t. napensis, similar to thoracicus with more decurved bill, browner crown, thinner black borders on streaks
- C. t. venezuelensis, longer bill than nominate, darker overall, buffier and more heavily streaked throat, blackish crown, body darker olive-brown, and rump, wings, and tail deeper rufous-chestnut
- C. t. brevipennis, like venezuelensis but slightly smaller with a longer bill
- C. t. zarumillanus, like venezuelensis but larger with a longer, less curved, bill

== Distribution and habitat ==
The subspecies of the red-billed scythebill are found thus:

- C. t. brevipennis, from central Panama's Coclé Province into Colombia along the Pacific coast to northern Chocó Department
- C. t. venezuelensis, locally across northern Colombia from Córdoba Department into northern and central Venezuela to the Rio Orinoco
- C. t. thoracicus, coastal from Colombia's Nariño Department south into western Ecuador
- C. t. zarumillanus, coastal far northwestern Peru's departments of Tumbes and Piura
- C. t. napensis, the Amazon Basin of eastern Ecuador and eastern Peru
- C. t. notabilis, southwestern and western Brazil south of the Amazon River between Acre state and the Rio Madeira
- C. t. snethlageae, Amazon Basin of central Brazil on both sides and islands of the Amazon between the Rio Madeira and Rio Tapajós
- C. t. major, interior eastern and southern Brazil from Piauí and Ceará south to extreme western Paraná
- C. t. trochilirostris, coastal eastern Brazil between Pernambuco and Bahia
- C. t. devius, southwestern Amazon Basin in northern Bolivia and possibly into immediately adjoining southeastern Peru and western Brazil
- C. t. lafresnayanus, eastern Bolivia, Mato Grosso and Mato Grosso do Sul in Brazil, and western Paraguay
- C. t. hellmayri, southwestern Paraguay's Ñeembucú Department and northern Argentina as far south as Entre Ríos Province

The red-billed scythebill inhabits a wide variety of wooded landscapes, most of which are open to semi-open. These include Gran Chaco woodland, gallery forest, cerrado, caatinga, forest clusters in savannah, secondary forest, and some scrublands. In the Amazon Basin it favors seasonally flooded várzea and igapó forest and riverside canebrakes. In elevation it mostly occurs below about 1,200 m (3,900 ft) but reaches 1,900 m (6,200 ft) in Ecuador and 2,100 m (6,900 ft) in Venezuela.

== Behavior ==
=== Movement ===
The red-billed scythebill is believed to be a year-round resident throughout its range.

=== Feeding ===
The red-billed scythebill's diet is chiefly arthropods, especially soft-bodied ones like spiders, and also includes small vertebrates. It usually forages singly, though sometimes in pairs, and often joins mixed-species feeding flocks. It hitches up and along trunks and branches, mostly from the upper level of the understory to the subcanopy but also sometimes higher and lower. It typically takes its prey by probing crevices and holes in bark, bamboo, rotting wood, moss clumps, bromeliads, and epiphytes.

=== Breeding ===
The red-billed scythebill's breeding seasons vary widely across its very large range. For instance, it nests between May and July in northern Venezuela and September to November in southern Brazil. It nests in a cavity in a tree or stump which it lines with leaves and other plant matter. The clutch size is one to three eggs though usually two; the incubation period and time to fledging are not known. Evidence suggests that both parents contribute to caring for the brood.

=== Vocalization ===
Like its breeding seasons, the red-billed scythebill's songs vary widely throughout its range. One in Venezuela is "a rapid descending whinny...'we'he'he'he'he'he'he'e'e'e'e'e' ". In western Ecuador and Peru it is "a descending and gradually slowing series of fewer whistled notes, 'tuwee-tuwee-toowa-tew-tew' ". In northeastern Brazil the song is "a short series of fluted notes 'wuut wuut wit-wit-triffit' " that ascends at the end. The species also makes a variety of calls.

== Status ==
The IUCN has assessed the red-billed scythebill as being of Least Concern. It has a very large range and an estimated population of at least 500,000 mature individuals, though the population is believed to be decreasing. No immediate threats have been identified. It is considered uncommon to fairly common, though local, over most of its range. It is scarce in Panama and at upper elevations. "At least some populations [are] believed to be highly sensitive to human disturbance."
