= Nils Carl Gustaf Fersen Gyldenstolpe =

Swedish explorer, zoologist, and ornithologist

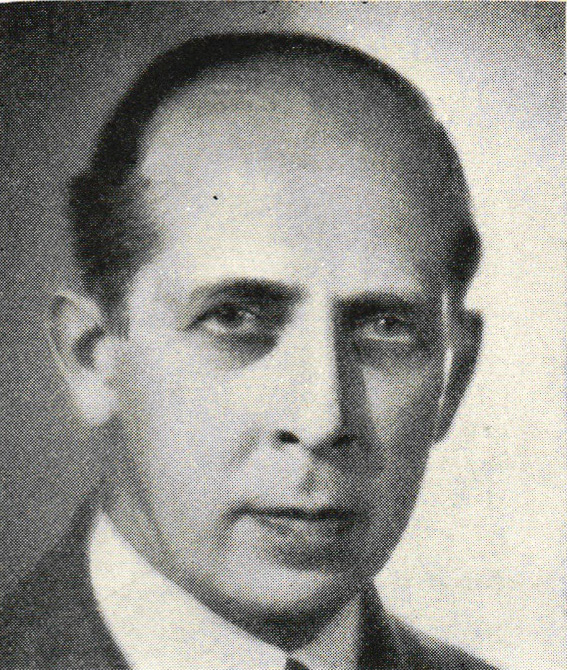
Nils Carl Gustaf Fersen Gyldenstolpe

Nils Carl Gustaf Fersen Gyldenstolpe (30 September 1886 – 10 April 1961) was a Swedish explorer, zoologist, and ornithologist. Born in the central Swedish province of Jämtland, he visited Lapland from 1906 to 1909 and joined the expedition of Dr. Paul Rosenius to southern Algeria. He also visited Thailand in 1911–12 and the Malay Peninsula in 1914–15. He studied at Uppsala University and joined under Professor Einar Lönnberg at the Department of Vertebrates of the Naturhistoriska Riksmuseum in Stockholm. He continued to work here throughout his life. In 1924 he obtained a Ph.D. from Lund University for his studies on the birds of central and eastern Africa.

The subspecific name of the Tupana scythebill, Campylorhamphus procurvoides gyldenstolpei, is named after him. Also, a species of Thai lizard, Isopachys gyldenstolpei, is named in his honor.
