= Isopachys roulei =

Conservation status
- Least Concern (IUCN 3.1)

Scientific classification
- Kingdom: Animalia
- Phylum: Chordata
- Class: Reptilia
- Order: Squamata
- Family: Scincidae
- Genus: Isopachys
- Species: I. roulei

Binomial name
- Isopachys roulei (Angel, 1920)
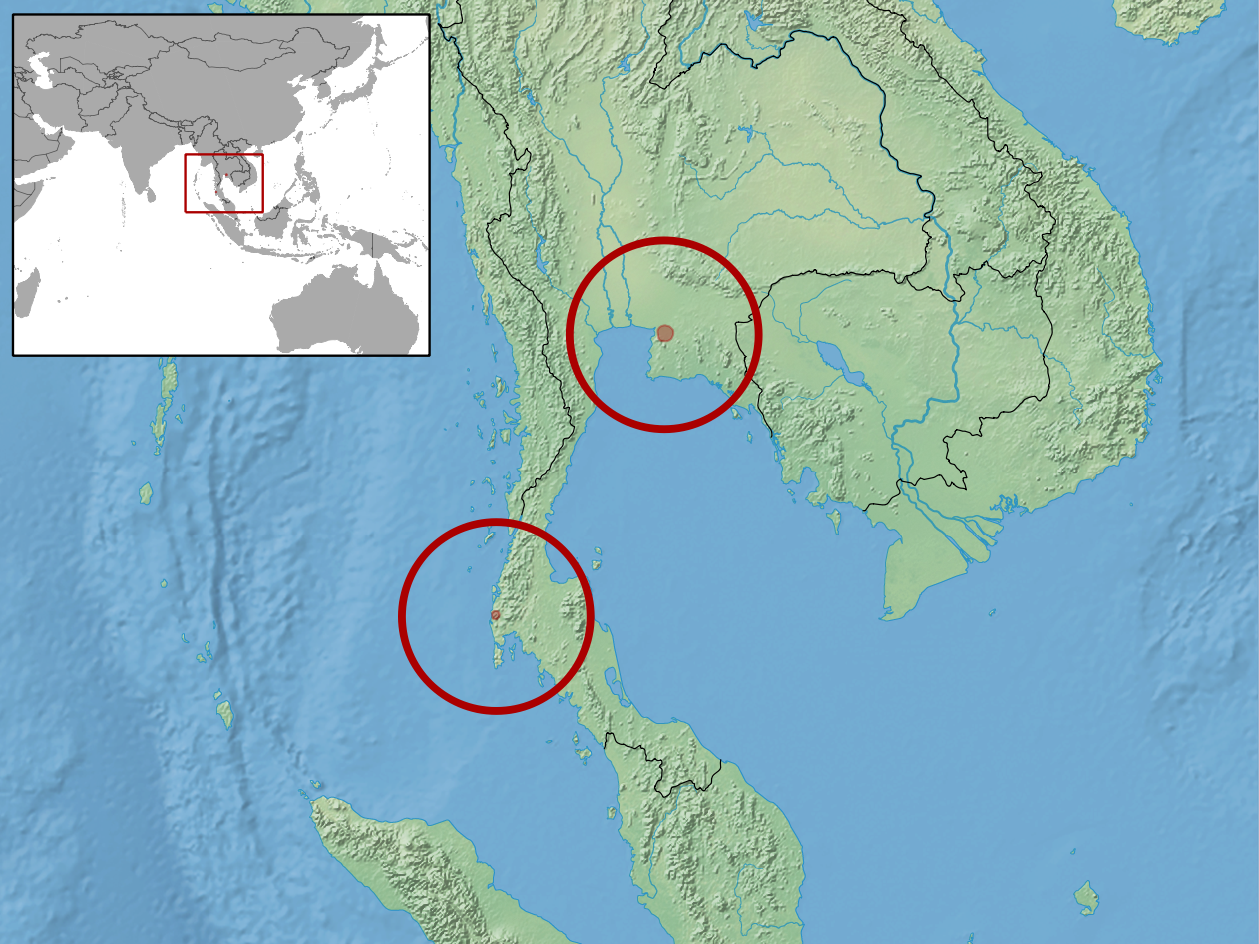

Synonyms
- Typhloseps roulei Angel, 1920

Species of lizard

Isopachys roulei, also known as the Chonburi snake skink, is a species of limbless skink. It is endemic to Thailand and known from Chonburi and Nakhon Ratchasima Provinces.
