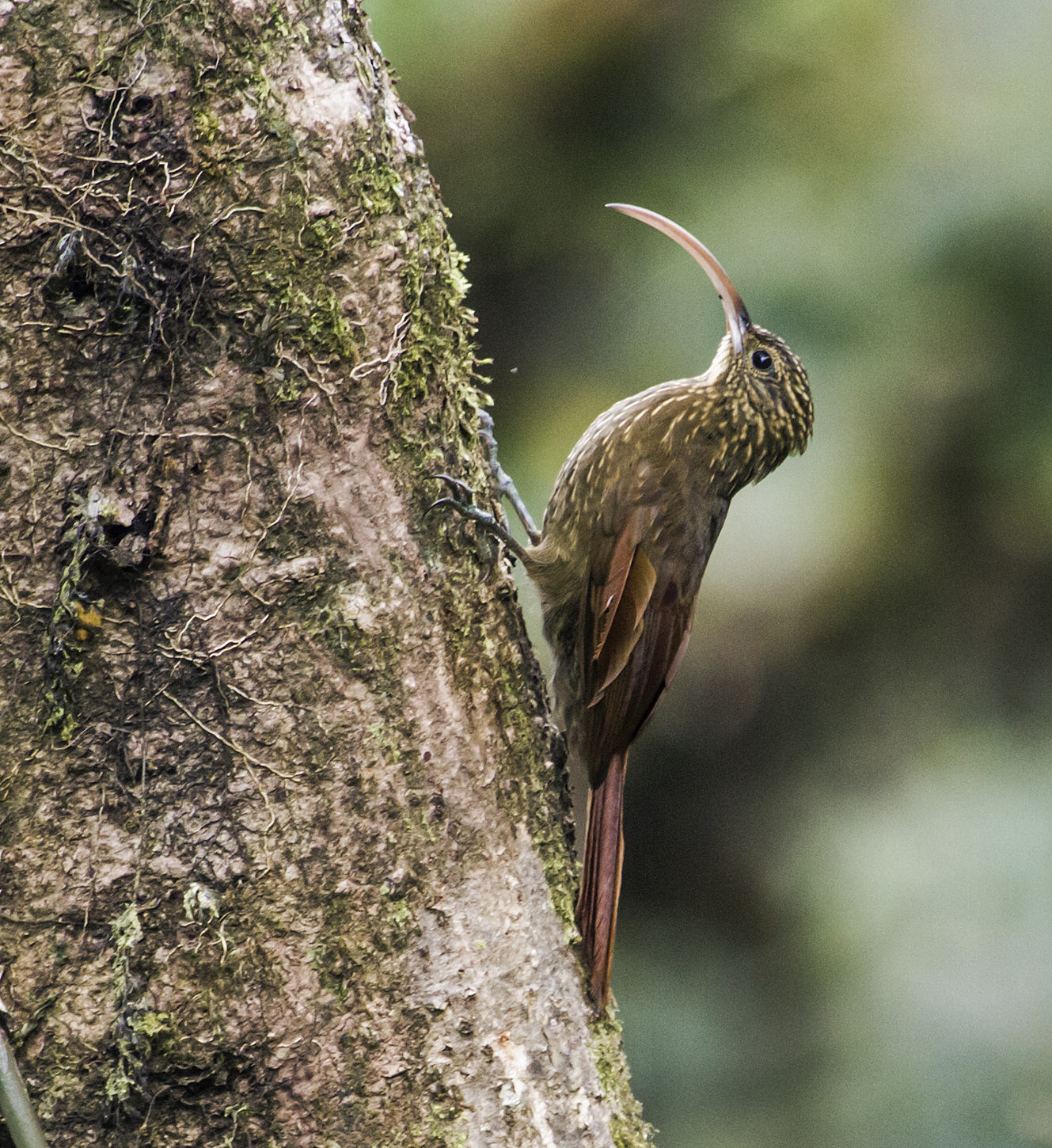
- C. p. pusillius at Chinapintza, Zamora-Chinchipe, Ecuador

Conservation status
- Least Concern (IUCN 3.1)

Scientific classification
- Kingdom: Animalia
- Phylum: Chordata
- Class: Aves
- Order: Passeriformes
- Family: Furnariidae
- Genus: Campylorhamphus
- Species: C. pusillus

Binomial name
- Campylorhamphus pusillus (Sclater, PL, 1860)

= Brown-billed scythebill =

Species of bird

The brown-billed scythebill (Campylorhamphus pusillus) is a species of bird in the subfamily Dendrocolaptinae of the ovenbird family Furnariidae. It is found in Colombia, Costa Rica, Ecuador, Panama, Peru, and Venezuela.

== Taxonomy and systematics ==
The brown-billed scythebill has five subspecies:

- C. p. borealis Carriker, 1910
- C. p. olivaceus Griscom, 1927
- C. p. tachirensis Phelps, WH & Phelps, WH Jr, 1956
- C. p. guapiensis Romero-Zambrano, 1980
- C. p. pusillus (Sclater, PL, 1860)

Subspecies C. p. borealis has sometimes been treated as a separate species. Some authors have suggested that subspecies C. p. tachirensis and C. p. guapiensis are not valid and should be merged into the nominate C. p. pusillus.

== Description ==
The brown-billed scythebill is 20 to 25 cm (7.9 to 9.8 in) long and weighs 32 to 48 g (1.1 to 1.7 oz). It is a slim, medium-sized woodcreeper with a very long, slim, dramatically decurved bill. The sexes have the same plumage. Adults of the nominate subspecies have a face and neck streaked buff and blackish brown, with a faint buffy supercilium. Their crown and nape are dark brown, with thin deep buff streaks that extend sparsely onto the upper back. Their back and wing coverts are deep reddish brown, their rump is cinnamon-rufous, and their wings and tail are rufous-chestnut. Their primaries have grayish brown edges and dusky tips. Their throat is deep buff with dusky streaks. Their underparts are dark brown to olive-brown that becomes more rufescent on the lower belly and undertail coverts. Their lower neck, breast, and upper belly have thin deep buff streaks; their undertail coverts have lighter buff streaks. Their underwing coverts are cinnamon-buff to ochraceous. Their iris is dark brown to cinnamon-brown, their bill blackish brown to brownish horn, and their legs and feet olive-green to blackish brown. Juveniles are darker and more olivaceous than adults, with wider deeper buff but less distinct streaks, and a shorter and darker bill.

The other subspecies of the brown-billed scythebill differ from the nominate and each other thus:

- C. p. borealis, darker overall than nominate, more blackish crown, more olive underparts, narrower but more extensive and deeper buff streaks above and below, wings and tail deeper chestnut, and darker maxilla
- C. p. olivaceus, smaller and darker than borealis with black crown, deeper brown back and more olive underparts
- C. p. tachirensis, more olive than nominate, especially on underparts
- C. p. guapiensis, smaller than nominate, more brownish, ochraceous streaking only on crown, nape, breast, and upper belly

== Distribution and habitat ==
The subspecies of the brown-billed scythebill have discontinuous ranges and are found thus:

- C. p. borealis, Caribbean slope and part of Pacific slope of Costa Rica; western Panama into Chiriquí and Bocas del Toro provinces; one record in extreme southern Nicaragua
- C. p. olivaceus, central and eastern Panama between Veraguas and Darién provinces
- C. p. tachirensis, northeastern Colombia's Serranía del Perijá and extreme Eastern Andes into northwestern Venezuelan states of Zulia and Táchira
- C. p. guapiensis, coastal areas in southwestern Colombia's Cauca Department
- C. p. pusillus, both slopes of Colombia's Western and Central Andes south through both slopes of Ecuador's Andes and into Peru's Andes on the east slope to the Department of San Martín

The brown-billed scythebill inhabits humid evergreen forest, mostly in highlands but locally in lowlands. It favors middle-elevation cloudforest, where it is found in the interior and edges. It less often occurs in mature secondary forest. In Central America it ranges in elevation mostly between 300 and 1,700 m (1,000 and 5,600 ft) but reaches 2,500 m (8,200 ft) in southern Costa Rica. In Colombia it ranges from 250 to 2,700 m (800 to 8,900 ft). In Ecuador it mostly occurs between 600 and 2,100 m (2,000 and 6,900 ft) but locally is found as low as 300 m (1,000 ft).

== Behavior ==
=== Movement ===
The brown-billed scythebill is believed to be a year-round resident throughout its range, though some elevational movements are suspected in Central America.

=== Feeding ===
The brown-billed scythebill's diet is mostly arthropods. It usually forages singly and occasionally in pairs, and very often as part of a mixed-species feeding flock. It hitches up and along trunks and vines, mostly from the understory to the subcanopy. It typically takes its prey from the surface of the substrate, and also by probing crevices and holes in bark, bromeliads, epiphytes, moss, and vine tangles.

=== Breeding ===
The brown-billed scythebill apparently forms long-term pair bonds. Its breeding season is not well defined but appears to include May to July. Nothing else is known about the species' breeding biology.

=== Vocalization ===
The brown-billed scythebill sings mostly at dawn and dusk. Its song is complex and highly variable, a "series of notes lasting 2·5–5 seconds, beginning with a soft, twittering trill that continues in background during a series of loud whistles that are usually descending (sometimes ascending) and somewhat quavering, e.g. 'wheéwhipwhipwhipaweé, at-t-t-t-t-weeaweéaweé' or 'twe-weo-WEO-weo weo-we-we-we-we-we' ".

== Status ==
The IUCN has assessed the brown-billed scythebill as being of Least Concern. It has a large range and an estimated population of at least 500,000 mature individuals that however is believed to be decreasing. No immediate threats have been identified. It is considered rare to uncommon and local in most of its range, and rare in lowlands. It is "[b]elieved to be highly sensitive to human disturbance, requiring extensive tracts of unbroken forest [and] locally at risk in Chocó of SW Colombia, where it is limited by lack of habitat."
