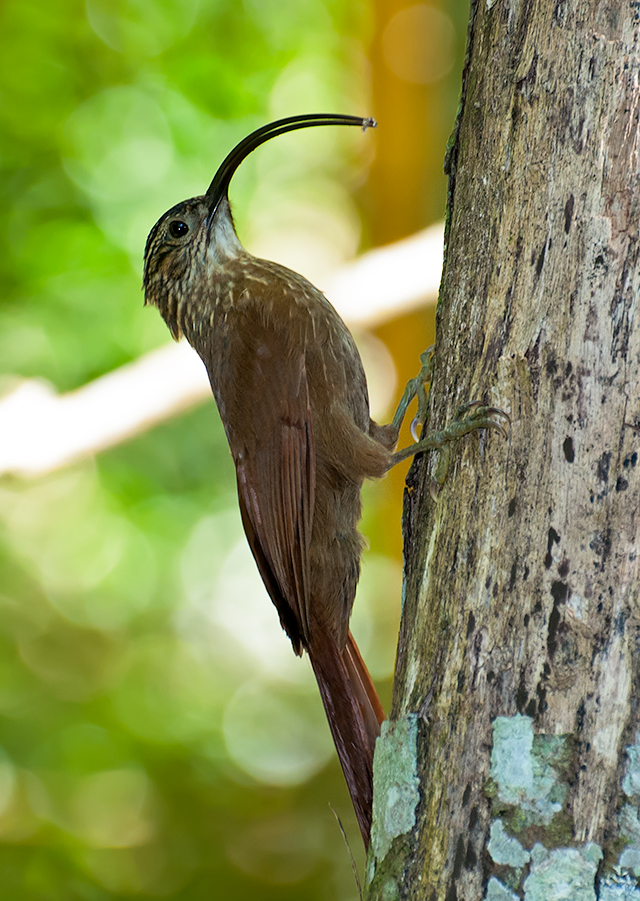
- Black-billed scythebill at Piraju, São Paulo State, Brazil

Conservation status
- Least Concern (IUCN 3.1)

Scientific classification
- Kingdom: Animalia
- Phylum: Chordata
- Class: Aves
- Order: Passeriformes
- Family: Furnariidae
- Genus: Campylorhamphus
- Species: C. falcularius

Binomial name
- Campylorhamphus falcularius (Vieillot, 1822)

= Black-billed scythebill =

Species of bird

The black-billed scythebill (Campylorhamphus falcularius) is a species of bird in the subfamily Dendrocolaptinae of the ovenbird family Furnariidae. It is native to the Atlantic Forest.

== Taxonomy and systematics ==
The black-billed scythebill and red-billed scythebill (C. trochilirostris) have at times been considered conspecific and also as sister species, but genetic data indicate neither is true.

The black-billed scythebill is monotypic.

== Description ==
The black-billed scythebill is 24 to 28 cm (9.4 to 11 in) long and weighs 37 to 42 g (1.3 to 1.5 oz). It is a slim, medium-sized woodcreeper with a very long, slim, dramatically decurved bill. The sexes have the same plumage. Adults have a thinly streaked face of buff and blackish with a narrow buffy-white supercilium. Their neck has the same colored streaks but they are coarser. Their crown and nape are blackish, with thin whitish to ochre streaks that extend onto the upper back. Their back, wing coverts, and rump are brownish to olive-brown. Their wings, uppertail coverts, and tail are rufous-chestnut; the tips of the primaries are blackish brown and the tail feathers have blackish shafts. Their throat is whitish with dark olive-brown streaks. Their underparts are pale brown to olive-brown that becomes more cinnamon on the undertail coverts. Their breast has indistinct thin whitish to creamy buff streaks that disappear on the belly and reappear faintly on the undertail coverts. Their underwing coverts are rosy cinnamon. Their iris is dark cinnamon-brown, their bill brownish black to black, and their legs and feet yellowish green, greenish gray, or dark gray. The population in Brazil is generally more rufescent and has a somewhat browner crown than those further south. Juveniles have brown legs and a shorter bill than adults.

== Distribution and habitat ==
The black-billed scythebill is found from the Chapada Diamantina in southeastern Brazil's Bahia state south into northern Rio Grande do Sul, in eastern Paraguay's Alto Paraná and Itapúa departments, and in northeastern Argentina's Misiones and Corrientes provinces. It primarily inhabits the humid and semi-deciduous Atlantic Forest but its range also extends into drier caatinga and cerrado where forest penetrates them. It favors mature evergreen forest, cloudforest, mature secondary forest, and thickets of Guadua bamboo. In elevation it reaches from near sea level to at least 1,600 m (5,200 ft) in the southern part of its range but in the northern part is seldom found below 600 m (2,000 ft).

== Behavior ==
=== Movement ===
The black-billed scythebill is believed to be a year-round resident throughout its range.

=== Feeding ===
The black-billed scythebill's diet is virtually unknown; the one stomach examined contained only arthropods. It usually forages singly, though sometimes in pairs, and regularly joins mixed-species feeding flocks. It hitches up and along trunks, branches, and bamboo, mostly from the understory to the subcanopy. It typically takes its prey by probing crevices and holes in bark, bamboo, bromeliads, and epiphytes.

=== Vocalization ===
The black-billed scythebill's song is a "level or descending, raspy 'sree-sree-sree- -' " repeated five or six times. Its call is a "very high, piercing 'pjeetpjeet'."

== Status ==
The IUCN has assessed the black-billed scythebill as being of Least Concern. It has a fairly large range but its population size is not known and is believed to be decreasing. No immediate threats have been identified. It is considered rare to locally uncommon in most of its range, though it appears to be fairly common at some southeastern Brazilian sites. It is found in several protected areas in Brazil. "A forest-dependent species believed to be highly sensitive to human disturbance, which has been extensive throughout its range; present only in largest fragment surveyed in one study, and not recorded at all in most studies concentrating on forest fragments."
