= Isopachys borealis =

Conservation status
- Least Concern (IUCN 3.1)

Scientific classification
- Kingdom: Animalia
- Phylum: Chordata
- Class: Reptilia
- Order: Squamata
- Family: Scincidae
- Genus: Isopachys
- Species: I. borealis

Binomial name
- Isopachys borealis Lang & Böhme, 1990

Species of lizard

Isopachys borealis, also known as Lang's isopachys, is a species of skink. It is found in Thailand and Myanmar. Isopachys borealis is limbless and fossorial, occurring in the moist topsoil of tuber and fruit plantations; its natural habitat preferences are poorly known.
