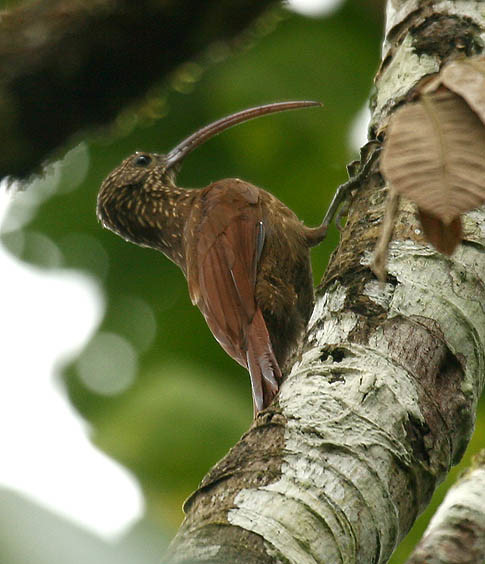
- Red-billed scythebill (Campylorhamphus trochilirostris)

Scientific classification
- Kingdom: Animalia
- Phylum: Chordata
- Class: Aves
- Order: Passeriformes
- Family: Furnariidae
- Subfamily: Dendrocolaptinae
- Genus: Campylorhamphus; Bertoni, AW, 1901

Type species
- Campylorhamphus longirostris Bertoni, 1901

Synonyms
- Campyloramphus (lapsus)

= Campylorhamphus =

Genus of birds

Campylorhamphus is a bird genus in the woodcreeper subfamily (Dendrocolaptinae). They are found in wooded habitats in South America and southern Central America, and all have very long, somewhat scythe-shaped bills.

The greater scythebill was formerly included in this genus, but it is closer to the scimitar-billed woodcreeper.

== Species ==
Image	Scientific name	Common name	Distribution
	Campylorhamphus trochilirostris	Red-billed scythebill	Argentina, Bolivia, Brazil, Colombia, Ecuador, Panama, Paraguay, Peru, and Venezuela.
	Campylorhamphus pusillus	Brown-billed scythebill	Colombia, Costa Rica, Ecuador, Panama, Peru, and Venezuela.
	Campylorhamphus falcularius	Black-billed scythebill	eastern Brazil, eastern Paraguay and far northeastern Argentina.
	Campylorhamphus procurvoides	Curve-billed scythebill	Amazonia.
	Campylorhamphus probatus	Tapajos scythebill	Amazonia.
	Campylorhamphus multostriatus	Xingu scythebill	Amazonia.
