= Gyldenstolpe's worm skink =

Conservation status
- Least Concern (IUCN 3.1)

Scientific classification
- Kingdom: Animalia
- Phylum: Chordata
- Class: Reptilia
- Order: Squamata
- Family: Scincidae
- Genus: Isopachys
- Species: I. gyldenstolpei

Binomial name
- Isopachys gyldenstolpei Lönnberg, 1916

Synonyms
- Isopachys gyldenstolpei Lönnberg, 1916; Ophioscincus gyldenstolpei — M.A. Smith, 1935; Rhodona gyldenstolpei — M.A. Smith, 1937; Isopachys gyldenstolpei — Taylor, 1963

Species of lizard

Gyldenstolpe's worm skink (Isopachys gyldenstolpei), also known commonly as Gyldenstolpe's isopachys and Gyldenstolpe's snake skink, is a species of lizard in the family Scincidae. The species is endemic to Thailand.

== Etymology ==
The specific name, gyldenstolpei, is in honor of Swedish ornithologist Nils Gyldenstolpe.

== Geographic range ==
I. gyldenstolpei is found only in Thailand.

== Habitat ==
The preferred natural habitat of I. gyldenstolpei is forest.

== Description ==
The maximum total length (including tail) of I. gyldenstolpei is 300 mm (12 in). The species is limbless.

== Behavior ==
I. gyldenstolpei is terrestrial and fossorial.

== Reproduction ==
I. gyldenstolpei is viviparous.
