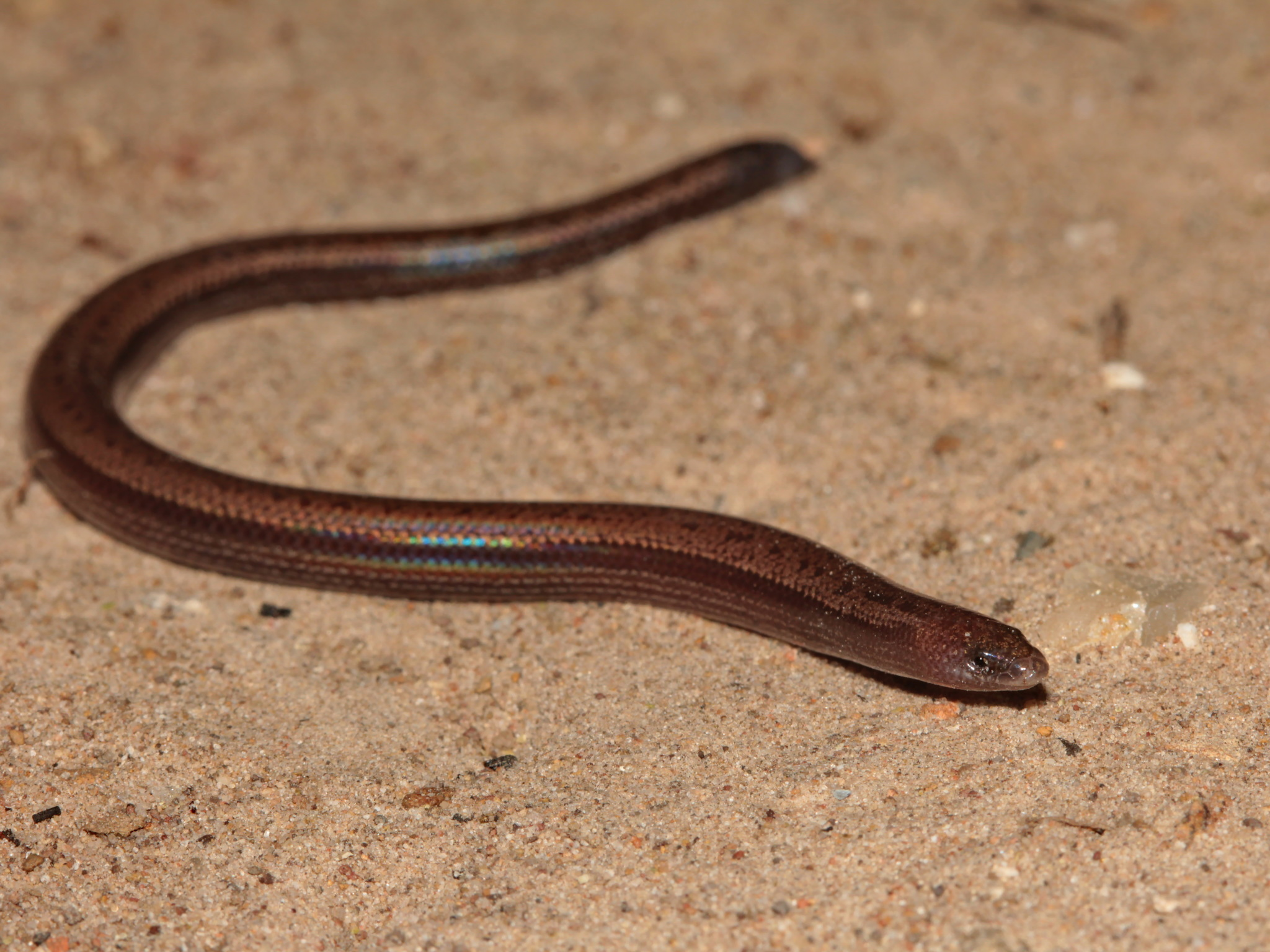

Conservation status
- Least Concern (IUCN 3.1)

Scientific classification
- Kingdom: Animalia
- Phylum: Chordata
- Class: Reptilia
- Order: Squamata
- Family: Scincidae
- Genus: Isopachys
- Species: I. anguinoides

Binomial name
- Isopachys anguinoides (Boulenger, 1914)
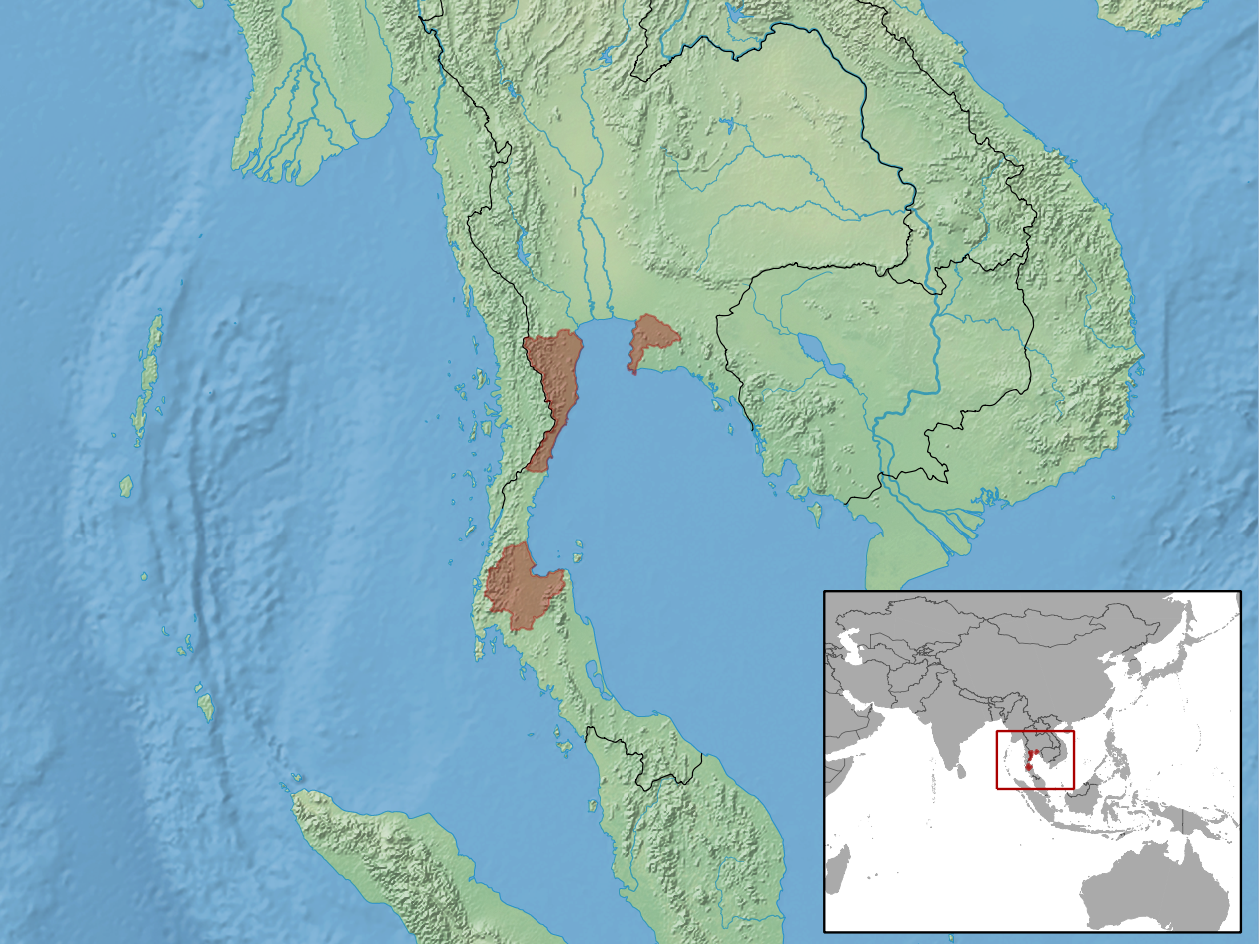

Synonyms
- Lygosoma anguinoides Boulenger, 1914; Ophioscincus anguinoides — M.A. Smith, 1935; Rhodona anguinoides — M.A. Smith, 1937; Ophioscincus anguinoides — Taylor, 1963; Isopachys anguinoides — Chan-ard et al. 1999

= Isopachys anguinoides =

Species of lizard

Isopachys anguinoides, commonly known as the Thai snake skink or Heyer's isopachys, is a species of skink in the family Scincidae.

== Geographic range ==
I. anguinoides is found in Thailand and Myanmar.
