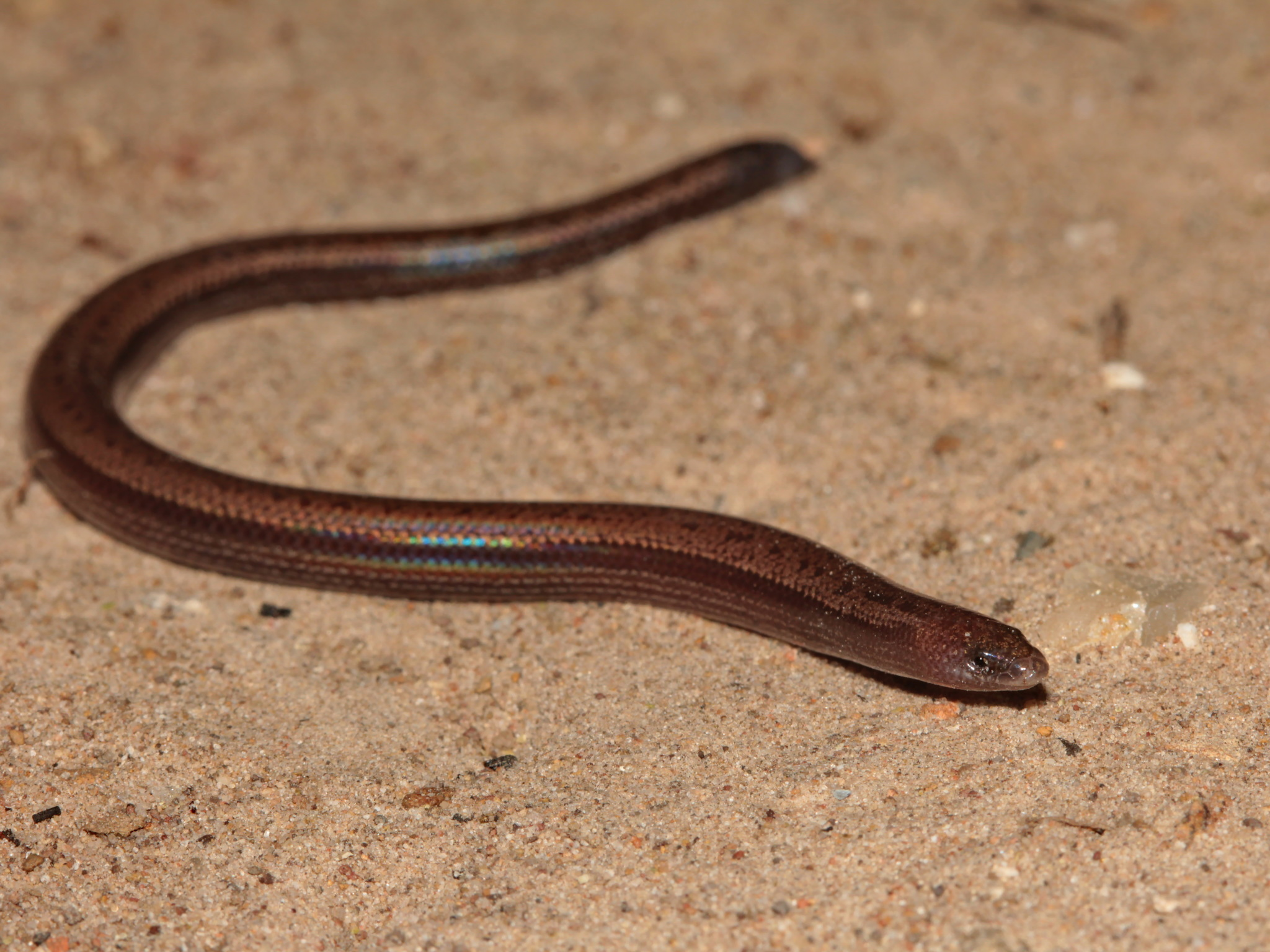
- I. anguinoides

Scientific classification
- Kingdom: Animalia
- Phylum: Chordata
- Class: Reptilia
- Order: Squamata
- Family: Scincidae
- Subfamily: Sphenomorphinae
- Genus: Isopachys; Lönnberg, 1916

= Isopachys =

Genus of lizards

Isopachys is a genus of skinks, lizards in the family Scincidae. The genus is endemic to Asia.

== Geographic range ==
Species in the genus Isopachys are found in Thailand and Myanmar.

== Species ==
There are four species in this genus.

- Isopachys anguinoides (Boulenger, 1914) – Thai snake skink, Heyer's isopachys
- Isopachys borealis Lang & Böhme, 1990 – Lang's isopachys
- Isopachys gyldenstolpei Lönnberg, 1916 – Gyldenstolpe's worm skink, Gyldenstolpe's isopachys, Gyldenstolpe's snake skink
- Isopachys roulei (Angel, 1920) – Chonburi snake skink

Nota bene: A binomial authority in parentheses indicates that the species was originally described in a genus other than Isopachys.
