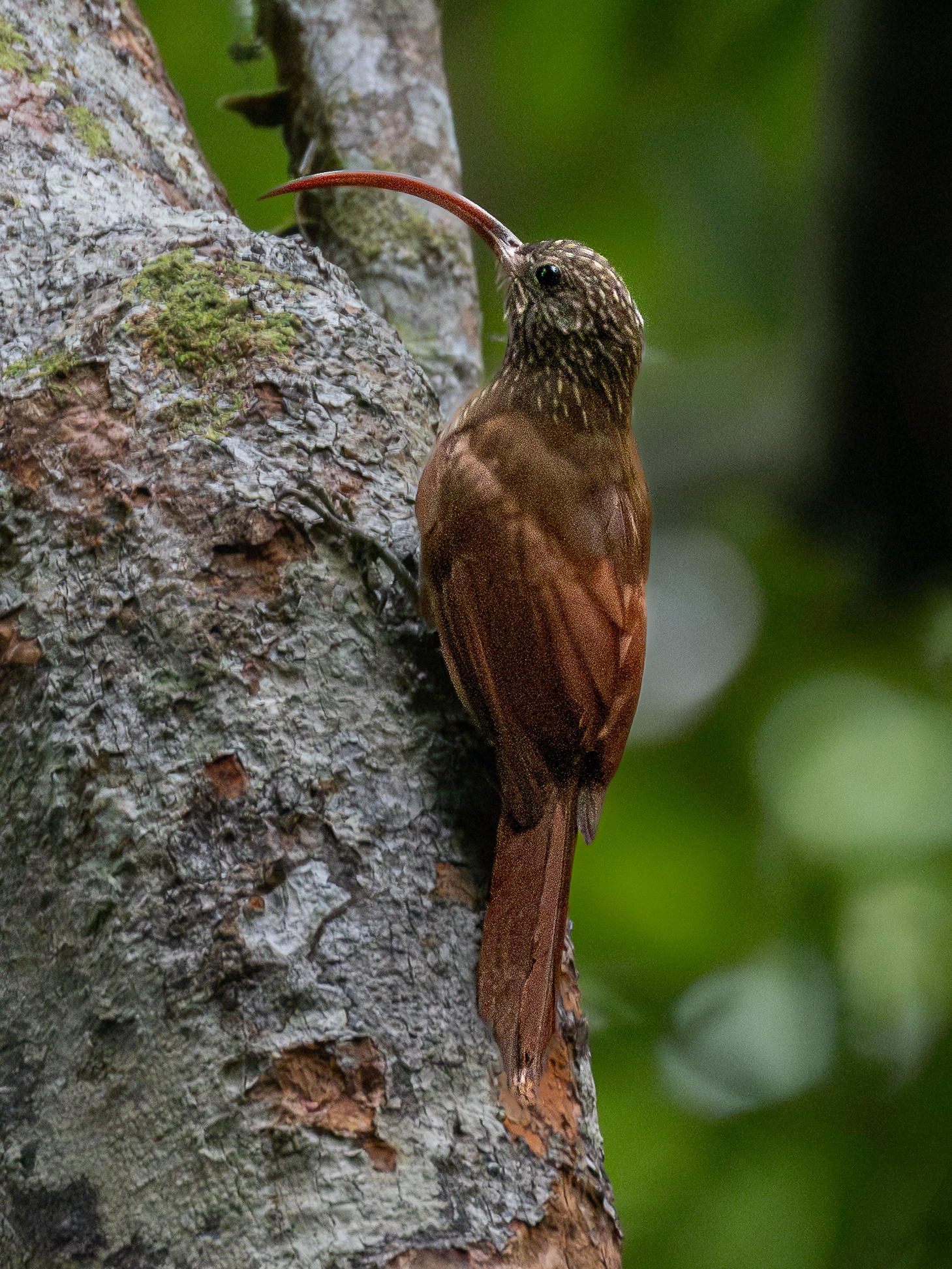
- subsp. probatus
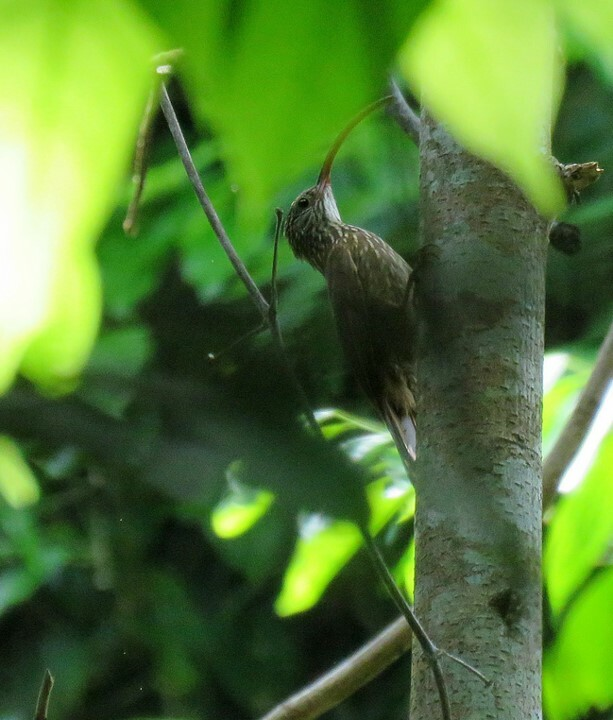
- subsp. cardosoi

Conservation status
- Least Concern (IUCN 3.1)

Scientific classification
- Kingdom: Animalia
- Phylum: Chordata
- Class: Aves
- Order: Passeriformes
- Family: Furnariidae
- Genus: Campylorhamphus
- Species: C. probatus

Binomial name
- Campylorhamphus probatus JT Zimmer, 1934

= Tapajos scythebill =

Species of bird found in the Amazon

The Tapajos scythebill (Campylorhamphus probatus) is a species of bird in the subfamily Dendrocolaptinae of the ovenbird family Furnariidae. It is endemic to Brazil.

== Taxonomy and systematics ==
The Tapajos scythebill was long considered conspecific with the curve-billed scythebill (C. procurvoides). By the early 2010s BirdLife International's Handbook of the Birds of the World (HBW) had separated it as this species. In July 2023 the International Ornithological Committee (IOC) adopted the split and in October 2023 the Clements taxonomy followed suit. The three systems assign it these two subspecies:

- C. p. probatus Zimmer, JT, 1934 — Madeira-Tapajos interfluve
- C. p. cardosoi Portes et al., 2013 — Tapajos-Xingu interfluve

Subspecies C. p. cardosoi was initially described as a species in its own right.

The South American Classification Committee of the American Ornithological Society retains these two taxa within the curve-billed scythebill.

== Description ==
The Tapajos scythebill is 22.5 to 25 cm (8.9 to 9.8 in) long and weighs 31.5 to 38 g (1.1 to 1.3 oz). It is a slim, medium-sized woodcreeper with a very long, slim, dramatically decurved bill. The sexes have the same plumage. Adults of the nominate subspecies C. p. probatus have a light blackish head. Their back and wing coverts are dull rufous-brown with inconspicuous lighter streaks. Their rump and tail are chestnut. Their throat is dull white with a streaked appearance. Their underparts are dull brown with narrow buffy streaks with indistinct darker borders on the breast that don't continue onto the belly. Their iris is dark brown to chestnut and their bill has a blackish maxilla and a paler mandible. Subspecies C. p. cardosoi has much narrower streaks on the upper back that minimally extend to the lower back, whitish streaks on the breast with well defined darker borders, and a brown maxilla.

== Distribution and habitat ==
Subspecies C. p. probatus of the Tapajos scythebill is found in southwestern Amazonian Brazil south of the Amazon River between the Madeira and Tapajós rivers. C. p. cardosoi is found in eastern Amazonian Brazil south of the Amazon between the Tapajós and Xingu rivers and south into Mato Grosso state. The species inhabits humid evergreen forest. It greatly favors terra firme but occasionally occurs in floodplain and seasonally flooded forest. It often occurs in bamboo thickets or vine-rich areas. In all forest types the species favors the interior though it does visit the forest edges. In elevation it occurs below 500 m (1,600 ft).

== Behavior ==
=== Movement ===
The Tapajos scythebill is assumed to be a year-round resident throughout its range.

=== Feeding ===
The Tapajos scythebill's diet has not been described but is assumed to be mostly if not entirely arthropods. It almost always forages as part of mixed-species feeding flocks and will occasionally follow army ant swarms. It forages by gleaning and probing while hitching up and along trunks, branches, vines, and bamboo.

=== Breeding ===
Nothing is known about the Tapajos scythebill's breeding biology.

=== Vocalization ===
The nominate Tapajos scythebill's song is "a rapid trill...often (not always) with [a] longer introductory note, 'wheee, di, di-di-di-di-di-di-di-di-di-di-di-di-di-dew' ". That of C. p. cardosoi is similar, but with a higher-pitched introductory note and a faster pace. The species's usual call is "an explosive, relatively harsh 'chit-di-dit' ".

== Status ==
The IUCN has assessed the Tapajos scythebill as being of Least Concern. It has a large range, but its population size is not known and is believed to be decreasing. No immediate threats have been identified. It is fairly common in areas with bamboo and vine thickets and occurs in several conservation areas. However, cardosoi might be classed Vulnerable. It is "[h]ighly sensitive to habitat modification, requiring nearly continuous forest".
