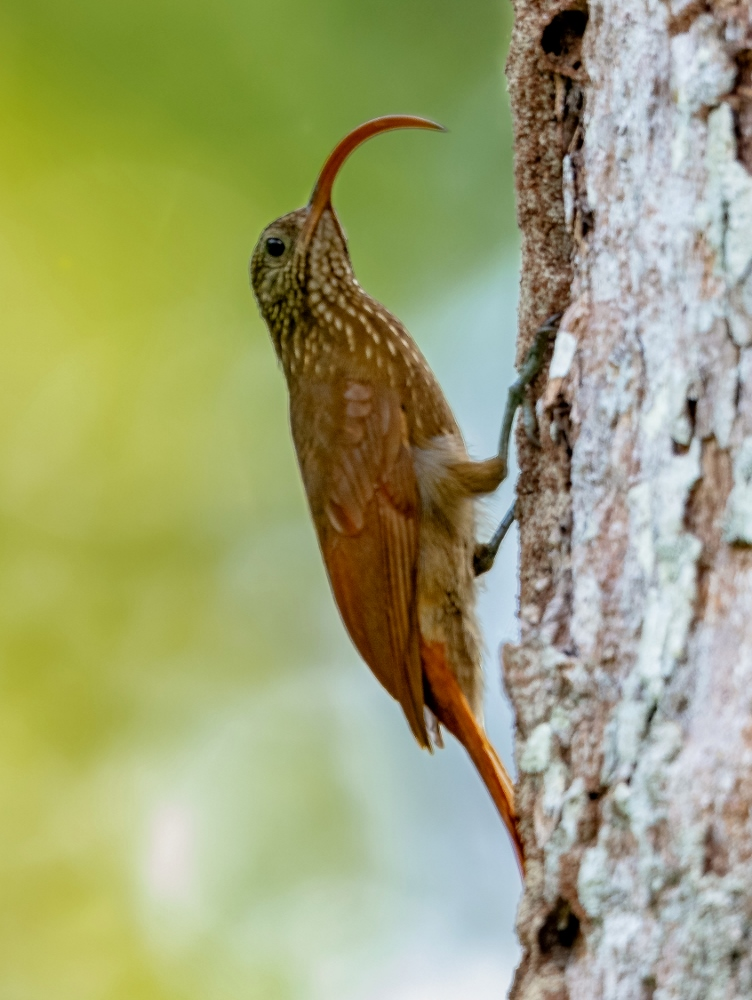
- At Manaus, Amazonas, Brazil

Conservation status
- Least Concern (IUCN 3.1)

Scientific classification
- Kingdom: Animalia
- Phylum: Chordata
- Class: Aves
- Order: Passeriformes
- Family: Furnariidae
- Genus: Campylorhamphus
- Species: C. procurvoides

Binomial name
- Campylorhamphus procurvoides (Lafresnaye, 1850)

= Curve-billed scythebill =

Species of bird

The curve-billed scythebill (Campylorhamphus procurvoides) is a species of bird in the subfamily Dendrocolaptinae of the ovenbird family Furnariidae. It is found in Brazil, Colombia, Ecuador, French Guyana, Guiana, Peru, Suriname, and Venezuela.

== Taxonomy and systematics ==
Taxonomists have not reached agreement on the curve-billed scythebill. The International Ornithological Committee (IOC), BirdLife International's Handbook of the Birds of the World (HBW), and the Clements taxonomy assign it these three subspecies:

- C. p. sanus Zimmer, JT, 1934
- C. p. gyldenstolpei Aleixo et al., 2013
- C. p. procurvoides (Lafresnaye, 1850)

The South American Classification Committee of the American Ornithological Society adds three others, C. p. probatus, C. p. cardosoi, and C. p. multostriatus. Until 2023 the IOC and Clements also included them. In July the IOC split off probatus and carsosoi to create the Tapajos scythebill and multostriatus to create the Xingu scythebill. Clements followed suit in October 2023. HBW had previously made those splits.

Subspecies C. p. gyldenstolpei was originally proposed as a full species.

This article follows the three-subspecies model.

== Description ==
The curve-billed scythebill is 22.5 to 25 cm (8.9 to 9.8 in) long and weighs 30 to 38 g (1.1 to 1.3 oz). It is a slim, medium-sized woodcreeper with a very long, slim, dramatically decurved bill. The sexes have the same plumage. Adults of the nominate subspecies C. p. procurvoides have a dark brown head and neck with thin whitish to buffy streaks on them and the face. Their back and wing coverts are olive-brown to reddish brown. Their flight feathers, rump, and tail ares rufous-chestnut that contrasts with the back. Their throat is buffy-white with a fine scaly appearance. Their underparts are dull brown with buffy-white arrow-shaped marks that become narrow streaks on the belly but don't continue onto the undertail coverts. Their underwing coverts are cinnamon-rufous. Their iris is dark brown to chestnut, their bill dark red to reddish brown (often with a dusky brown base and a paler mandible), and their legs and feet dusky green, brown, or dark gray.

Subspecies C. p. gyldenstolpei is very similar to the nominate. C. p. sanus is smaller than the nominate. It is more warmly colored with a whiter throat that is streaked instead of scaly. Its bill is shorter and more strongly decurved.

== Distribution and habitat ==
The subspecies of the curve-billed scythebill are found thus:

- C. p. sanus, the Amazon Basin from southeastern Colombia, northeastern Ecuador, and extreme northeastern Peru east through southern and eastern Venezuela, extreme northwestern Brazil to the Negro River, and Guyana
- C. p. gyldenstolpei, southwestern Brazil south of the Amazon and west of the Madeira River; probably also in adjacent Peru
- C. p. procurvoides, the northeastern Amazon Basin in Brazil north of the Amazon between the Negro River and Amapá state, Suriname, and French Guiana The IOC and Clements also place it in eastern Venezuela and Guyana

The curve-billed scythebill inhabits humid evergreen forest. It greatly favors terra firme but occasionally occurs in floodplain forest. In southern Amazonia it often occurs in bamboo thickets. Subspecies C. p. gyldenstolpei tends to be in forest on sandy soils. In all forest types the species favors the interior though it does visit the forest edges. In elevation it mostly occurs below 500 m (1,600 ft) but reaches 700 m (2,300 ft) in Suriname. There is also a sight record in Venezuela at 900 m (3,000 ft).

== Behavior ==
=== Movement ===
The curve-billed scythebill is assumed to be a year-round resident throughout its range.

=== Feeding ===
The curve-billed scythebill's diet is mostly if not entirely arthropods. Single birds and pairs usually forage as part of mixed-species feeding flocks in the forest understory to its mid-level, though it will feed up to the subcanopy. It forages by gleaning and probing while hitching up and along trunks, branches, vines, and bamboo.

=== Breeding ===
The curve-billed scythebill's breeding season has not been fully defined but appears to include at least February to April. It nests in cavities in trees, either natural or made by a woodpecker. The clutch size is two eggs. The incubation period, time to fledging, and details of parental care are not known.

=== Vocalization ===
The curve-billed scythebill sings mostly at dawn and only in short bursts. The subspecies' songs differ. That of the nominate is "an accelerating series...of 7–9 somewhat melancholy whistles on even pitch or falling slightly...'weeee, weé, wee, we, we, wew' or 'kuweee, kuwee, kwee, wee-wee-we-we-we. ". That of C. p. sanus "begins as series of drawn-out whistles, rapidly accelerates into fast and relatively harsh rattle, 'tweee, weee, weee, weee, weee, twe-we-we-wi-wi-i-i-i-i-wik!' ". That of C. p. gyldenstolpei has not been put into words, but "differs from that of other members in the complex in the shape and syntax of the notes, it being the only taxon to possess notes characterized by an abrupt frequency peak before their end". All subspecies give "an explosive, relatively harsh 'chit-di-dit' " call.

== Status ==
The IUCN has assessed the curve-billed scythebill as being of Least Concern. It has a very large range, but its population size is not known and is believed to be decreasing. No immediate threats have been identified. It is considered uncommon and patchily distributed in most of its range and is rare along its western edge in Colombia, Ecuador, and Peru. It is "[h]ighly sensitive to habitat modification, requiring nearly continuous forest" and has quickly abandoned fragmented forest.
