= Slaty antshrike =

The slaty antshrikes are several species of birds in the family Thamnophilidae that used to be considered conspecific under the name slaty antshrike (Thamnophilus punctatus). The species are entirely para- or allopatric:

- Black-crowned antshrike, Thamnophilus atrinucha
- Northern slaty antshrike, Thamnophilus punctatus
  - Guianan slaty antshrike, Thamnophilus (p.) punctatus
  - Marañón (or Peruvian) slaty antshrike, Thamnophilus (punctatus) leucogaster
- Natterer's slaty antshrike, Thamnophilus stictocephalus
- Bolivian slaty antshrike, Thamnophilus sticturus
- Planalto slaty antshrike, Thamnophilus pelzelni
- Sooretama slaty antshrike, Thamnophilus ambiguus
