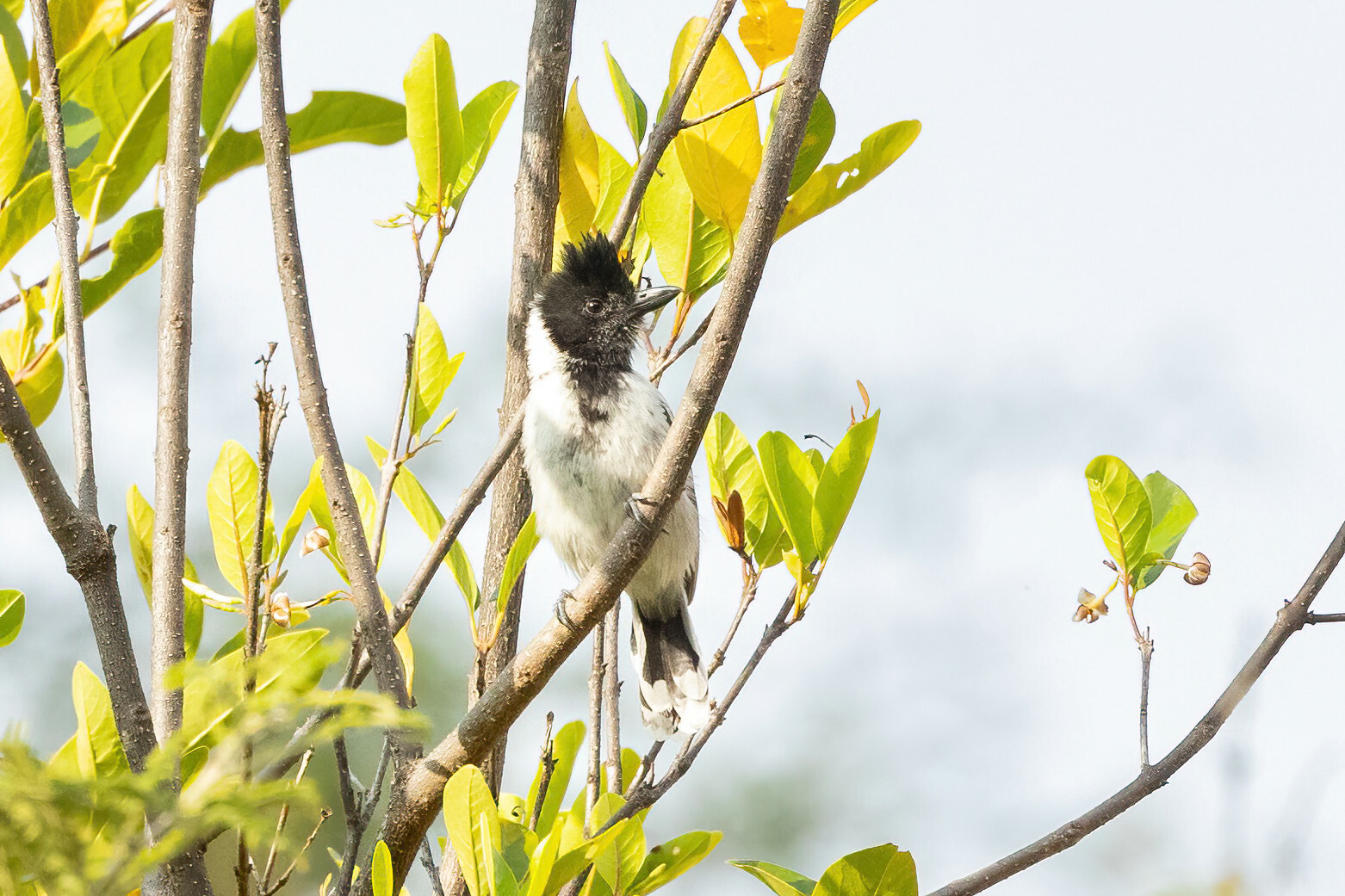

Conservation status
- Vulnerable (IUCN 3.1)

Scientific classification
- Kingdom: Animalia
- Phylum: Chordata
- Class: Aves
- Order: Passeriformes
- Family: Thamnophilidae
- Genus: Thamnophilus
- Species: T. shumbae

Binomial name
- Thamnophilus shumbae (Carriker, 1934)

= Maranon antshrike =

Species of bird

The Maranon antshrike (Thamnophilus shumbae) is a passerine bird in the family Thamnophilidae according to some taxonomists. This non-migratory bird is native to Peru.

== Etymology ==
The specific name "shumbae" derives from the locality of Shumba, Cajamarca, Peru.

== Taxonomy ==
This species was previously classified by BirdLife International's Handbook of the Birds of the World as a subspecies of the collared antshrike (T. bernardi). The South American Classification Committee of the American Ornithological Society, the International Ornithological Committee, and the Clements taxonomy have not accepted the split and retain the taxon's subspecies status.

== Description ==
Thamnophilus shumbae are usually between 15 and 16 cm. They display significant sexual dimorphism. Males are observed to have a black throat, upper breast, and head with their bills being speckled in white. The crown on females is said to be entirely rufous.

== Distribution and habitat ==
The species is said to inhabit in lowland tropical and subtropical deciduous forest. They are also thought to occur in riparian zones and shrubland. They are found in the basin of Marañón River in Peru. The maximum in which the Maranon antshrike occurs is 1,000 m.

== See also ==
- Collared antshrike - a closely related bird species
