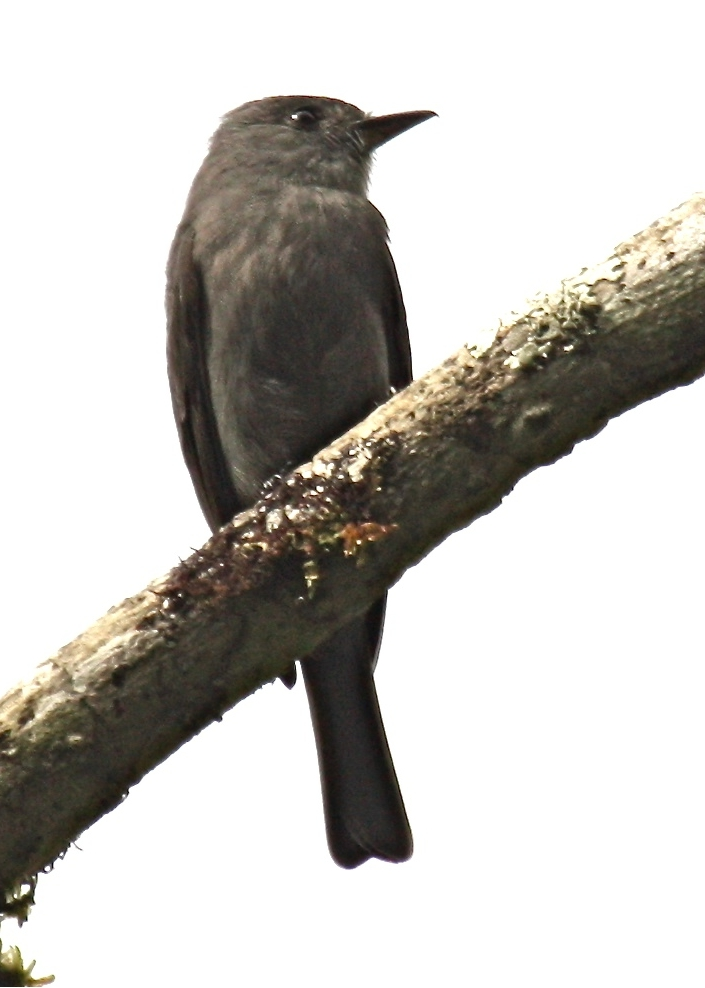

Conservation status
- Least Concern (IUCN 3.1)

Scientific classification
- Kingdom: Animalia
- Phylum: Chordata
- Class: Aves
- Order: Passeriformes
- Family: Thamnophilidae
- Genus: Thamnophilus
- Species: T. unicolor

Binomial name
- Thamnophilus unicolor (Sclater, PL, 1859)

= Uniform antshrike =

Species of bird

The uniform antshrike (Thamnophilus unicolor) is a species of bird in subfamily Thamnophilinae of family Thamnophilidae, the "typical antbirds". It is found in Colombia, Ecuador, and Peru.

== Taxonomy and systematics ==
The uniform antshrike was described by the English zoologist Philip Sclater in 1859 and given the binomial name Dysithamnus unicolor. It was later transferred to genus Thamnophilus, which had been erected in 1816 by Louis Pierre Vieillot. The uniform antshrike, the white-shouldered antshrike (T. aethiops), and the upland antshrike (T. aroyae) form a superspecies or are sister species.

The uniform antshrike has three subspecies, the nominate T. u. unicolor (Sclater, PL, 1859), T. u. grandior (Hellmayr, 1924), and T. u. caudatus (Carriker, 1933).

== Description ==
The uniform antshrike is 14.5 to 17 cm (5.7 to 6.7 in) long and weighs about 24 g (0.85 oz). Members of genus Thamnophilus are largish members of the antbird family; all have stout bills with a hook like those of true shrikes. This species exhibits significant sexual dimorphism. Adult males of the nominate subspecies are mostly deep gray or blackish gray. They sometimes have white tips on their outer tail feathers. Adult females have a rufous crown and a gray face. Their upperparts are rufous brown and their underparts pale rufous brown. Immatures of both sexes are similar to adult females. Both sexes have a gray-white to whitish gray iris, a black bill, and gray or blue-gray legs and feet. Subspecies T. u. grandior is very similar to the nominate, though males more frequently have small white tips on their outer tail feathers. Males of T. u. caudatus are essentially the same as males of grandior. Females are darker and more rufous than the nominate and grandior females.

== Distribution and habitat ==
The uniform antshrike has a disjunct distribution. The nominate subspecies is found on the Pacific slope of the Andes for almost their entire length in Ecuador. Subspecies T. u. grandior is found in all three ranges of the Colombian Andes and also on the east slope of the Andes from southern Morona-Santiago Province in southeastern Ecuador south into northern Peru as far as northern San Martín Department. T. u. caudatus is found on the eastern slope of the Andes from southern San Martín south locally to Cuzco Department. The species inhabits the understorey of humid montane forest. Though it does occur in the forest interior it favors the forest's edges and gaps caused by fallen trees. In elevation it ranges between 1,200 and 2,200 m (3,900 and 7,200 ft) in Colombia, mostly between 1,000 and 2,000 m (3,300 and 6,600 ft) in Ecuador, and between 1,250 and 2,300 m (4,100 and 7,500 ft) in Peru.

== Behavior ==
=== Movement ===
The uniform antshrike is presumed to be a year-round resident throughout its range.

=== Feeding ===
The uniform antshrike's diet is not known in detail but is thought to be mostly insects and other arthropods; seeds are also eaten. It usually forages singly or in pairs and almost entirely in dense vegetation. It seldom joins mixed-species feeding flocks. It usually forages very low to the ground but does occasionally feed as high as 8 m (26 ft) above it. It forages while hopping among branches, commonly reaching from a perch to glean prey from leaves, stems, vines, and branches. It occasionally probes clusters of dead leaves and makes short flights to glean.

=== Breeding ===
The uniform antshrike is believed to be monogamous. Its breeding season has not been defined but appears to span from February to June in Colombia. It makes a deep cup nest of plant fibers, usually covered with moss that dangles below the cup. The clutch size, incubation period, time to fledging, and details of parental care are not known.

=== Vocalization ===
The uniform antshrike's song has been described as "a simple short series of nasal notes, each note sometimes with rising inflection, 'anh, anh, anh, anh' (sometimes 3 or 5 notes)" and as "a slightly accelerating and rising, slow series of 4–8 high, descending notes NYAH NYAH-nyah-nyah". The song of subspecies T. u. caudatus is similar to that of the other two but higher pitched. One call is "a rattled 'kar'r'r'r' " also described as "a gruff bark-rattle...trr-grr'r'r". Others are "a descending whine...and a throaty, descending caw: raahhh".

== Status ==
The IUCN has assessed the uniform antshrike as being of Least Concern. It has a large range; its population size is not known and is believed to be decreasing. No immediate threats have been identified. It is considered fairly common in Colombia, uncommon in Ecuador though more numerous in the west, and uncommon to fairly common in Peru. "Human activity has little short-term direct effect on Uniform Antshrike, other than the local effects of habitat destruction".
