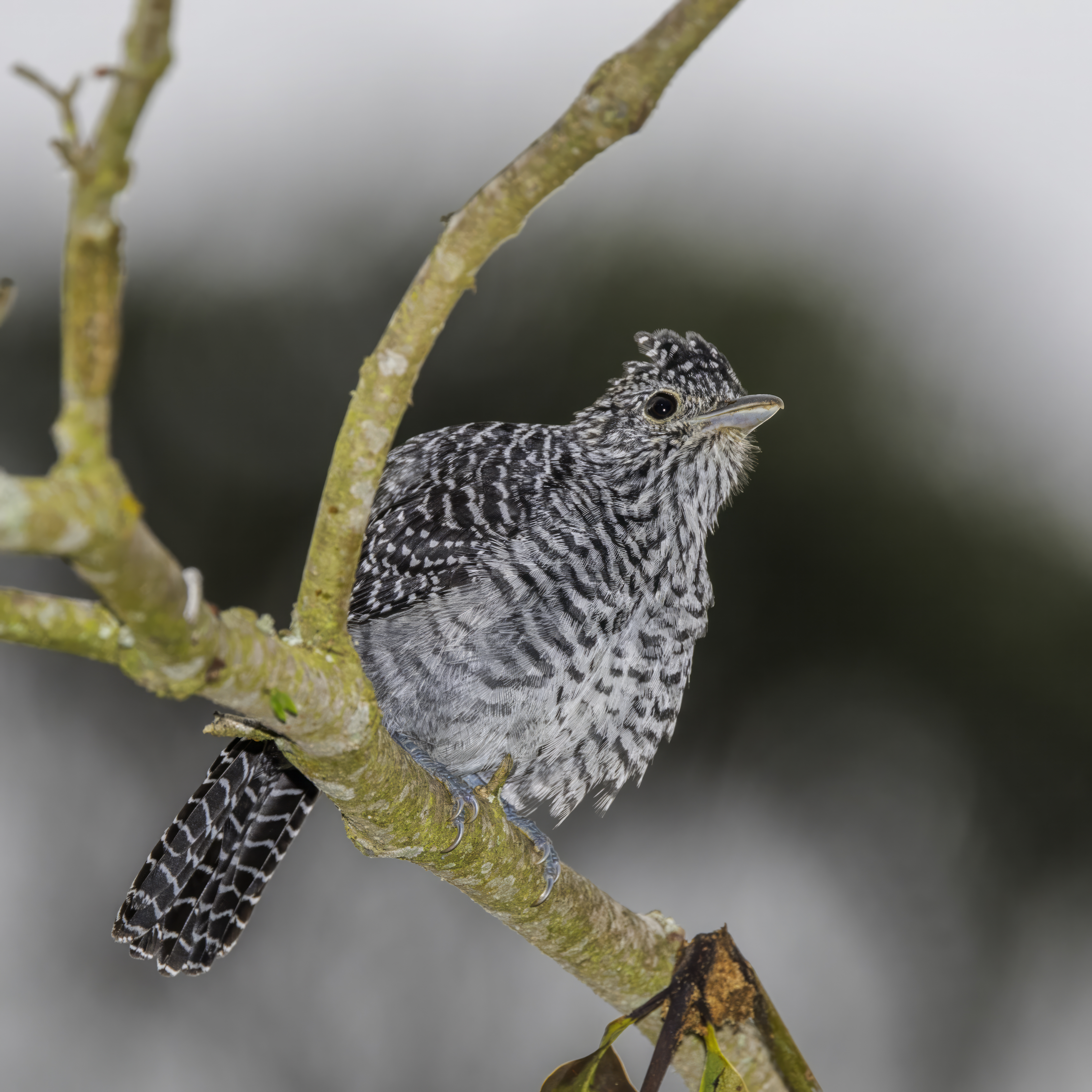
- Male T. m. multistriatus in Cundinamarca, Colombia
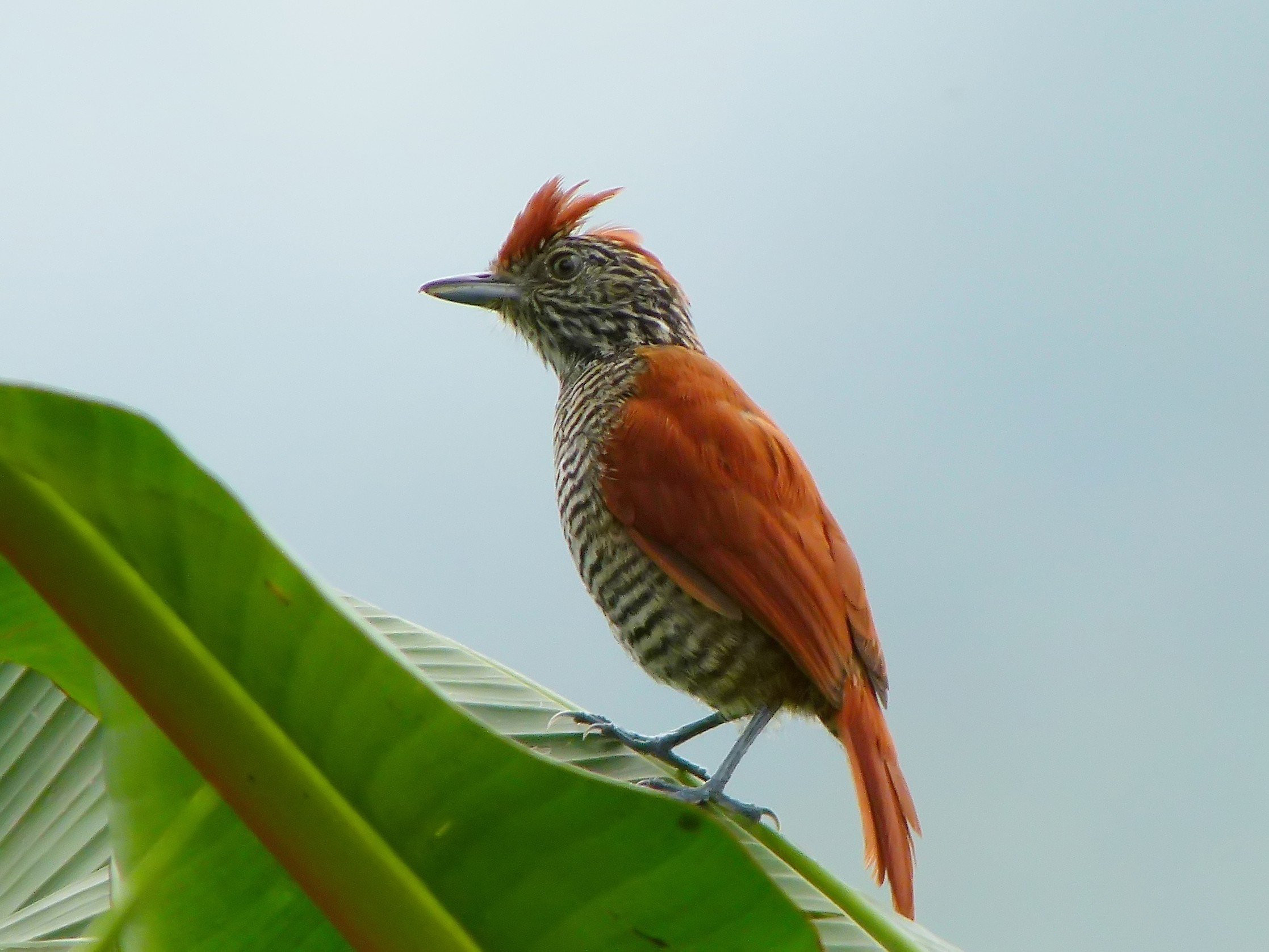
- Female in Manizales, Colombia

Conservation status
- Least Concern (IUCN 3.1)

Scientific classification
- Kingdom: Animalia
- Phylum: Chordata
- Class: Aves
- Order: Passeriformes
- Family: Thamnophilidae
- Genus: Thamnophilus
- Species: T. multistriatus

Binomial name
- Thamnophilus multistriatus Lafresnaye, 1844

= Bar-crested antshrike =

Species of bird

The bar-crested antshrike (Thamnophilus multistriatus) is a species of bird in subfamily Thamnophilinae of family Thamnophilidae, the "typical antbirds". It is found in Colombia and Venezuela.

== Taxonomy and systematics ==
Some researchers suspected that the bar-crested antshrike should be treated as a subspecies of the chestnut-backed antshrike (T. palliatus). This treatment was never accepted, and a study published in 2007 confirmed that the bar-crested antshrike is a full species.

The bar-crested antshrike has these four subspecies:

- T. m. brachyurus Todd, 1927
- T. m. selvae Meyer de Schauensee, 1950
- T. m. multistriatus Lafresnaye, 1844
- T. m. oecotonophilus Borrero & Hernández-Camacho, 1958

== Description ==
The bar-crested antshrike is 15 to 16.5 cm (5.9 to 6.5 in) long and weighs 21 to 23 g (0.74 to 0.81 oz). Members of genus Thamnophilus are largish members of the antbird family; all have stout bills with a hook like those of true shrikes. This species exhibits marked sexual dimorphism though both sexes have a crest. Adult males of the nominate subspecies T. m. multistriatus are almost entirely plumaged with alternating black and white bars, including their crest. The exception is their face and throat, which are streaked black and white. Adult females have a cinnamon-rufous crest, crown, upperparts, wings, and tail. Their nape has a narrow band of black and white. The sides of their head and throat are streaked black and white. The rest of their underparts are barred with black and white with a reddish brown tinge on their lower flanks. Adults of both sexes have a yellowish iris. Subadult males resemble adult males with a yellowish-brown tinge on their body and flight feathers.

Subspecies T. m. brachyurus has a shorter tail than the nominate and the white bars on its underparts are wider. T. m. selvae also has a shorter tail than the nominate but its underparts' black bars are wider. T. m. oecotonophilus resembles selvae but with a longer tail.

== Distribution and habitat ==
The bar-crested antshrike has a disjunct distribution. The subspecies are found thus:

- T. m. brachyurus: Colombia, in the Western Andes except the headwaters of the San Juan River, and the western slope of the Central Andes between the departments of Antioquia and Cauca
- T. m. selvae: Colombia, at the headwaters of the San Juan River on western slope of the western Andes in Risaralda and Caldas departments
- T. m. multistriatus: Colombia, on the eastern slope of the Central Andes and the western slope of the Eastern Andes from Antioquia and Santander departments south to Nariño Department
- T. m. oecotonophilus: Colombia, on the western slope of the Eastern Andes in Norte de Santander and Boyacá departments; also nominally in the Serranía del Perijá in extreme western Venezuela though as of 2003 the most recent record was a specimen taken in 1951

The bar-crested antshrike inhabits all levels of dry to humid deciduous and evergreen forest and second-growth scrub. It favors the forest edge with thickets and shrubby borders and also occurs in somewhat open areas like cultivated lands, gardens, orchards, and well-vegetated parks. In elevation it mostly ranges between 900 and 2,200 m (3,000 and 7,200 ft) but occurs locally as low as 250 m (800 ft) on the Pacific side of Colombia. The 1951 specimen from Venezuela was taken at 1,650 m (5,400 ft).

== Behavior ==
=== Movement ===
The bar-crested antshrike is a year-round resident throughout its range.

=== Feeding ===
The bar-crested antshrike's diet is not known in detail but is thought to be mostly insects and other arthropods. Its foraging behavior is also little known, but is assumed to be similar to that of the barred antshrike (T. doliatus), which see here.

=== Breeding ===
The bar-crested antshrike's breeding season has not been fully documented but appears to include March to June. Nothing else is known about its breeding biology.

=== Vocalization ===
The bar-crested antshrike's song is "much like Barred Antshrike but lazier with marked acceleration at end; typically 6-10 notes, dū, dü dü dü du du-du-da'da".

== Status ==
The IUCN has assessed the bar-crested antshrike as being of Least Concern. It has a large range; its population size is not known but is believed to be stable. No immediate threats have been identified. It is considered locally fairly common to overall common. "Its preference for edge and second-growth habitats renders it of low sensitivity to environmental disturbance."
