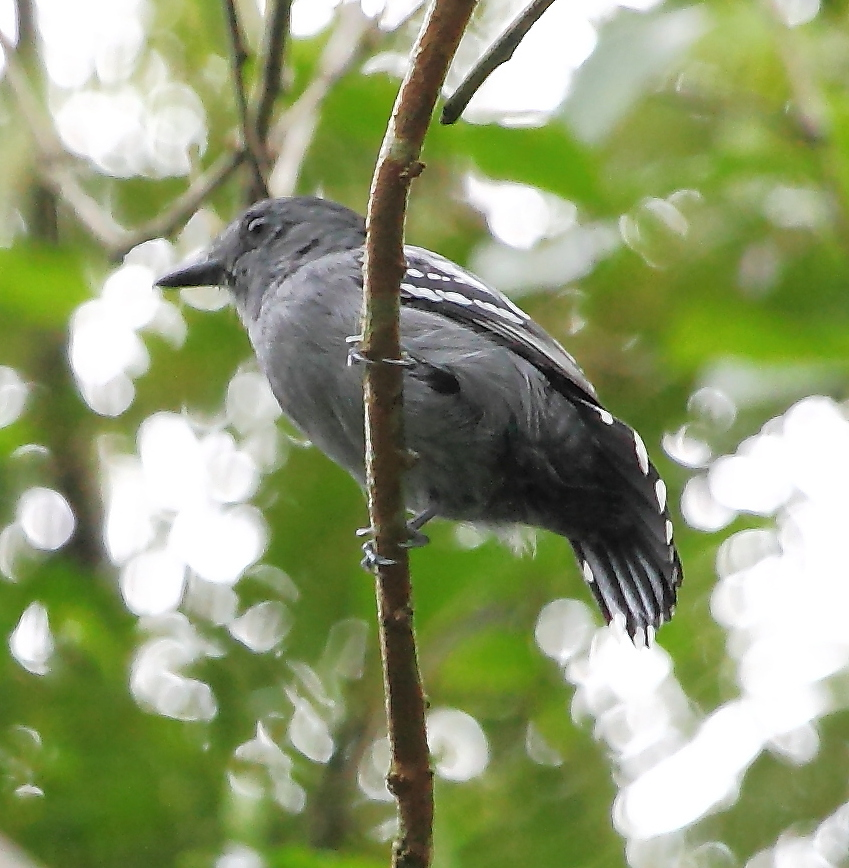
- Male
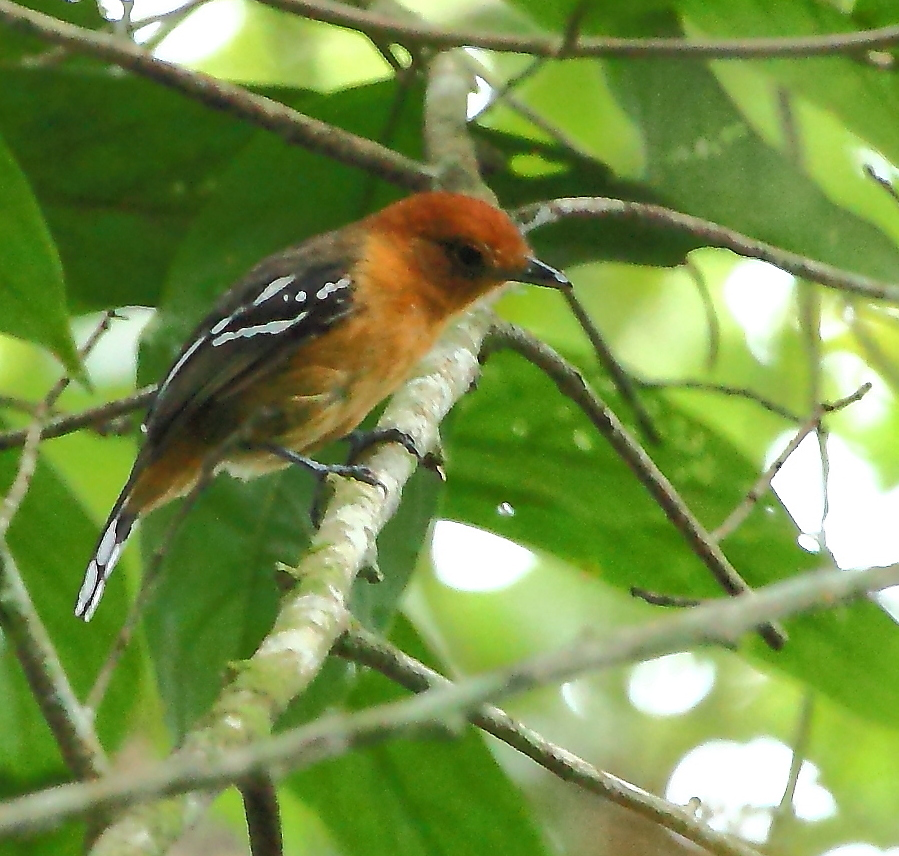
- Female

Conservation status
- Least Concern (IUCN 3.1)

Scientific classification
- Kingdom: Animalia
- Phylum: Chordata
- Class: Aves
- Order: Passeriformes
- Family: Thamnophilidae
- Genus: Thamnophilus
- Species: T. amazonicus

Binomial name
- Thamnophilus amazonicus Sclater, PL, 1858

= Amazonian antshrike =

Species of bird

The Amazonian antshrike (Thamnophilus amazonicus) is a species of bird in subfamily Thamnophilinae of family Thamnophilidae, the "typical antbirds". It is found in every mainland South American country except Argentina, Chile, Paraguay, and Uruguay.

== Taxonomy and systematics ==
The Amazonian antshrike was described and illustrated by the English zoologist Philip Sclater in 1858 and given its current binomial name Thamnophilus amazonicus. It has these five subspecies:

- T. a. cinereiceps Pelzeln, 1868
- T. a. divaricatus Mees, 1974
- T. a. amazonicus Sclater, PL, 1858
- T. a. obscurus Zimmer, JT, 1933
- T. a. paraensis Todd, 1927

Subspecies T. a. cinereiceps was originally described as a species and some early twentieth century authors maintained that treatment when others recognized it in its current subspecies status. What is now the northern slaty antshrike subspecies T. punctatus huallagae was for a time included as a subspecies of the Amazonian antshrike.

== Description ==
The Amazonian antshrike is 14 to 15 cm (5.5 to 5.9 in) long and weighs 17 to 21 g (0.60 to 0.74 oz). Members of genus Thamnophilus are largish members of the antbird family; all have stout bills with a hook like those of true shrikes. This species exhibits significant sexual dimorphism. Adult males of the nominate subspecies T. a. amazonicus are black on the center of the forehead and crown; the rest of their head is gray. Their back is mostly black with a gray rump and a hidden white patch between the scapulars. Their wings, scapulars, and wing coverts are black with white spots and edges. Their tail is black with white tips and spots on the outer feathers. Their underparts are gray. Adult females have a bright rufous crown. The rest of their head and their underparts to the belly are bright yellowish red-brown; their belly is buff. Their back is deep olive. Their wings and tail are similar to the male's but browner with pale olive edges on the flight feathers.

Both sexes of subspecies T. a. cinereiceps are smaller and paler than the nominate. Males have a gray crown and gray upperparts with a few black feathers. Females have gray mixed into their yellowish red-brown breast, olive-gray flanks, and buff-tinged smoky white belly and crissum. Males of subspecies T. a. divaricatus have a blackish gray face and a mixed black and gray back. Females have paler and grayer underparts than the nominate. Subspecies T. a. obscurus is the darkest of all. Males have nearly or entirely black upperparts and dark gray underparts. Females are dark and their tail feathers often lack pale tips. Males of T. a. paraensis have paler underparts than the nominate and often have faint white bars on their belly. Females have a reddish tinge on their tail and pale cinnamon-buff belly and crissum.

== Distribution and habitat ==
The Amazonian antshrike is found throughout the Amazon Basin. The subspecies are distributed thus:

- T. a. cinereiceps: from western Amazonas in Venezuela south in east-central Colombia and into northwestern Brazil along the upper Negro River and its lower right bank to the Solimões River (upper Amazon)
- T. a. divaricatus: eastern Bolívar state in extreme eastern Venezuela and east through the Guianas and northeastern Brazil north of the Amazon to the Atlantic in Amapá and Pará
- T. a. amazonicus: from southern Amazonas Department in Colombia south through Ecuador's eastern Orellana Province and eastern Peru into northern Bolivia and in western Brazil south of the Amazon east to the Tapajós River and south to Acre, Rondônia, and western Mato Grosso
- T. a. obscurus: south-central Brazil south of the Amazon between the Tapajós and Tocantins rivers
- T. a. paraensis: Brazil south of the Amazon east from the Tocantins River to western Maranhão

The Amazonian antshrike inhabits somewhat different landscapes across its range. In general they are evergreen forest and secondary forest. In all forest types it is found from the understorey to the mid-storey. Subspecies T. a. cinereiceps occurs mostly in areas of sandy soil such as low-stature savanna woodlands on white sand and the edges of taller terra firme and igapó forest. Subspecies T. a. divaricatus primarily occurs in terra firme that is heavy with vines but also near the summits of tepuis and along rivers. The nominate T. a. amazonicus is almost confined to seasonally flooded várzea and igapó, where it favors to viny edges and interior light-gaps such as those caused by fallen trees. T. a. obscurus also inhabits edges but occurs as well in the forest interior, dense secondary forest, and stands of Guadua bamboo in terra firme and transitional forest. T. a. paraensis occurs mostly in secondary forest, less often in light-gaps within terra firme and igapó, and rarely in várzea. In elevation it occurs below 400 m (1,300 ft) in Colombia, below 200 m (700 ft) in Ecuador, and below 400 m (1,300 ft) in Venezuela but for a single record at 1,300 m (4,300 ft).

== Behavior ==
=== Movement ===
The Amazonian antshrike is presumed to be a year-round resident throughout its range.

=== Feeding ===
The Amazonian antshrike's diet has not been detailed but is mostly insects and other arthropods. It usually forages singly and in pairs, mostly between 5 and 17 m (15 and 55 ft) of the ground though sometimes as low as 1 m (3 ft). It hops through thickets and vine tangles, gleaning prey from leaves, branches, bamboo, and individual vines and vine tangles. It reaches and lunges from a perch and makes short upward sallies to capture prey. It often joins mixed-species feeding flocks as they move through its territory and has occasionally been observed following army ant swarms.

=== Breeding ===
The Amazonian antshrike breeds between May and January in Brazil; its season elsewhere has not been defined. Its nest is a deep cup made from a wide variety of plant and fungal fibers and often covered with moss on its outside. It is suspended by its rim from a branch fork, typically between 1 and 3 m (3 and 10 ft) above the ground. The clutch size is two eggs. The incubation period, time to fledging, and details of parental care are not known.

=== Vocalization ===
The Amazonian antshrike's song is "a long...uncountable series that typically increases in speed and pitch initially, gradually levels off, then most often descends". The final notes are somewhat variable in quality and volume. One author writes it as "kur kur kur-kur-kur-kur-kur'ke'ke'ke'ke'kahkahkahkah". Its calls include a "long, downslurred, complaining 'caw' ", "an emphatic note with quality of a bark", and a "long raspy growl resembling a short rattle".

== Status ==
The IUCN has assessed the Amazonian antshrike as being of Least Concern. It has a very large range, and though its population size is not known it is believed to be stable. No immediate threats have been identified. It is considered fairly common in Colombia, local in Ecuador, uncommon and local in Peru, locally common in Venezuela, and uncommon to locally common elsewhere. It occurs in "vast areas of protected suitable habitat" and "adapts well to second growth in some portions of its range, thus rendering it less vulnerable to habitat disturbance".
