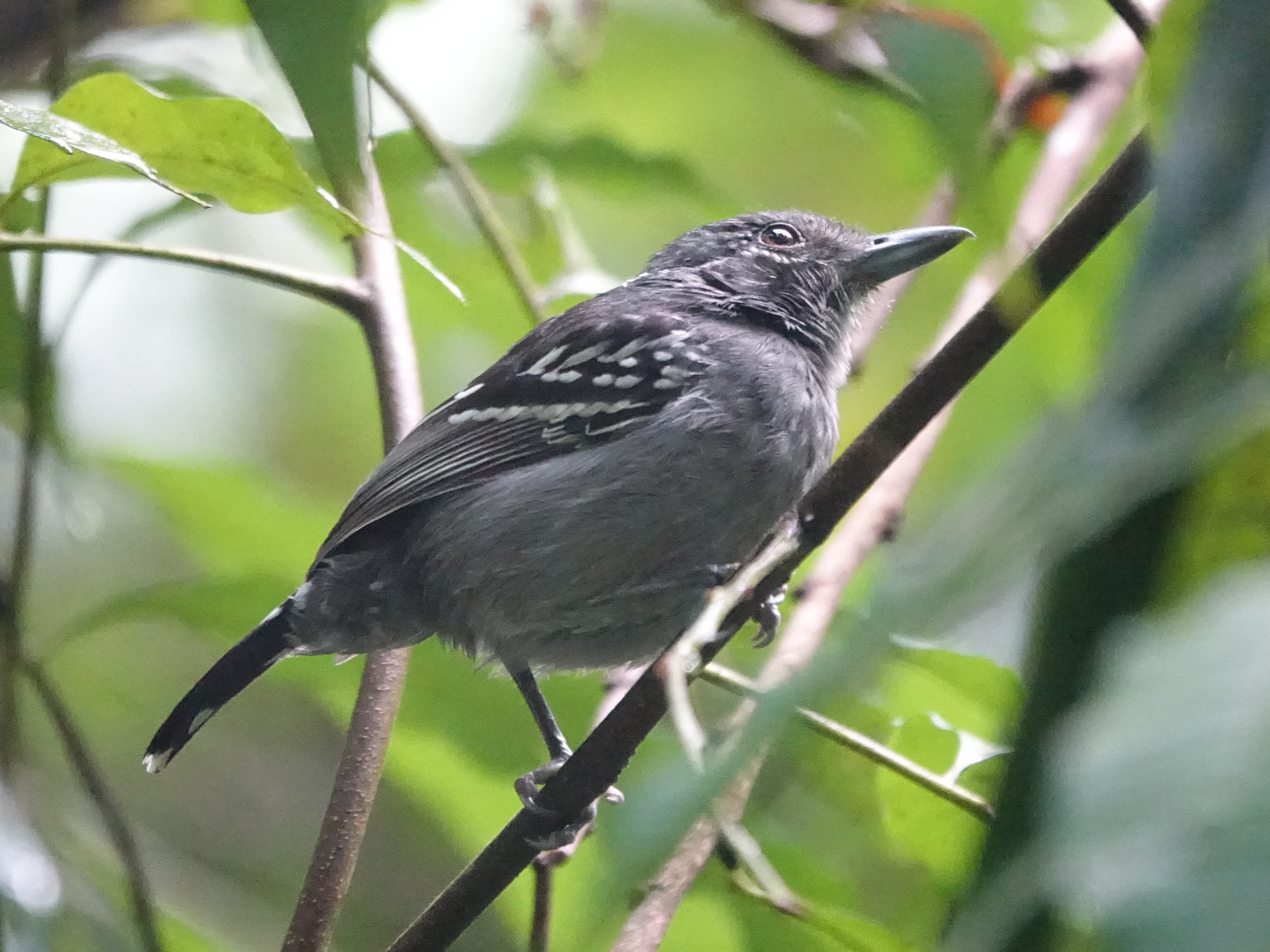

Conservation status
- Least Concern (IUCN 3.1)

Scientific classification
- Kingdom: Animalia
- Phylum: Chordata
- Class: Aves
- Order: Passeriformes
- Family: Thamnophilidae
- Genus: Thamnophilus
- Species: T. atrinucha

Binomial name
- Thamnophilus atrinucha Salvin & Godman, 1892

Synonyms
- Thamnophilus punctatus atrinucha

Audio
- Song of a black-crowned antshrike

= Black-crowned antshrike =

Species of bird

The black-crowned antshrike (Thamnophilus atrinucha) is a species of bird in subfamily Thamnophilinae of family Thamnophilidae, the "typical antbirds". It is found in every Central American country except El Salvador and in Colombia, Ecuador, Peru, and Venezuela.

== Taxonomy and systematics ==
What is now the black-crowned antshrike was long included as a subspecies of Thamnophilus punctatus, which at that time was called the slaty antshrike. Following the results of a study published in 1997, the slaty antshrike was split into six species. The remnant T. punctatus was named the northern slaty antshrike and the new T. atrinucha was named the western slaty antshrike. By 2012 taxonomists determined that T. atrinucha was not closely related to other slaty antshrikes so its English name was changed to black-crowned antshrike and its position within a linear presentation of genus Thamnophilus was adjusted. The black-crowned and black-hooded antshrike (T. bridgesi) are sister species.

The black-crowned antshrike has two subspecies, the nominate T. a. atrinucha (Salvin & Godman, 1892) and T. a. gorgonae (Thayer & Bangs, 1905).

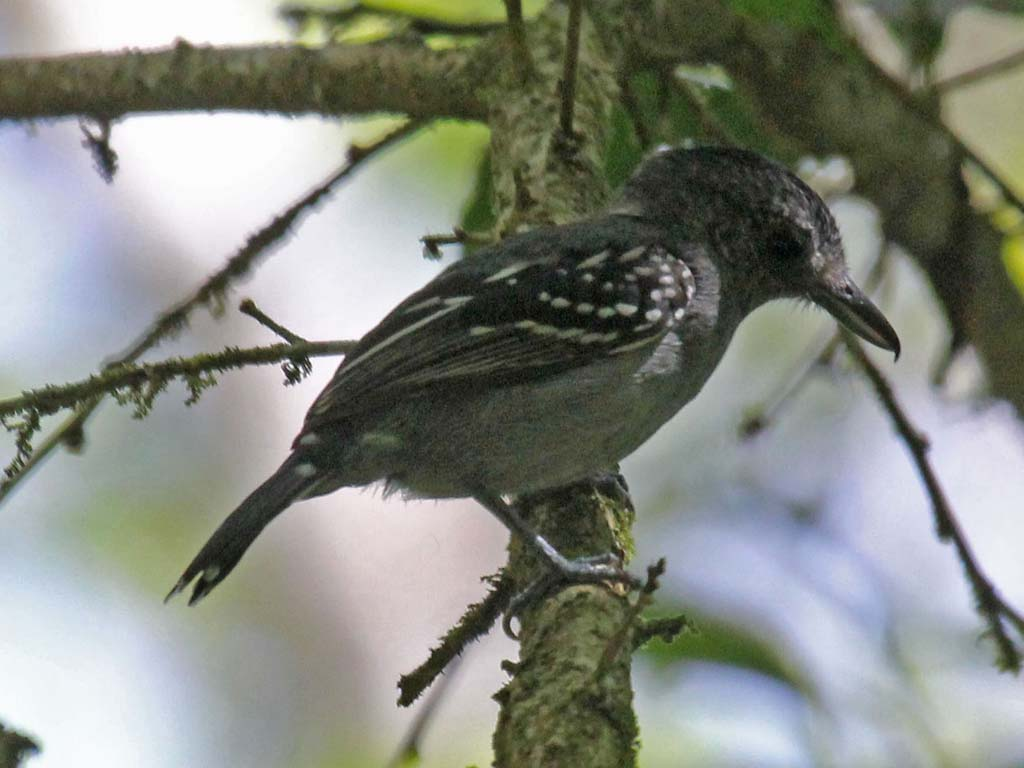
Male - Panama

== Description ==
The black-crowned antshrike is 14 to 15 cm (5.5 to 5.9 in) long and weighs 20 to 28.5 g (0.71 to 1.0 oz). Members of genus Thamnophilus are largish members of the antbird family; all have stout bills with a hook like those of true shrikes. This species exhibits significant sexual dimorphism. Adult males of the nominate subspecies have slaty gray upperparts with a gray forehead, a black crown and nape, a hidden white patch between their scapulars, and white-tipped black uppertail coverts. Their face is grizzled gray. Their wings are black with white tips on the coverts and white or gray edges on the flight feathers. Their tail is black with a white spot at the end of each feather. Their underparts, including the underside of their tail, are slaty gray. Adult females have brown to buffy brown upperparts. Their wings are fuscous-black with brown edges and white tips on the flight feathers. Their underparts are buffy brown to grayish brown. Both sexes have a brownish red to chocolate-brown iris and medium to dark gray legs and feet. Males have a dark gray bill and females light gray. Juveniles have dull cinnamon-brown upperparts and grayish white underparts. Males of subspecies T. a. gorgonae have more gray on their forehead and lighter gray underparts than the nominate. Females of gorgonae have a much darker crown, more rufous upperparts, and darker underparts than the nominate.

== Distribution and habitat ==
The nominate subspecies of the black-crowned antshrike has by far the larger range of the two. In Central America it is found on the Caribbean slope from southern Belize through Panama and on the Pacific slope in northwestern Costa Rica and in Panama from Coclé Province east. In South America it is found across northern Colombia including the Magdalena Valley and northwestern Venezuela as far as Trujillo state, and along the Pacific slope of Colombia and Ecuador into far northwestern Peru's Department of Tumbes. Subspecies T. a. gorgonae is found only on Gorgona Island of the southwestern coast of Colombia.

The black-crowned antshrike inhabits a variety of forested landscapes including primary and secondary semi-deciduous and evergreen forests. It favors the forest interior but does occur at its edges. It also favors the understorey to mid-storey but occurs all the way to the canopy. In elevation it ranges from sea level to 1,250 m (4,100 ft) in Central America, to 1,500 m (4,900 ft) in Colombia, mostly below 1,100 m (3,600 ft) in Ecuador, and to 1,000 m (3,300 ft) in Venezuela. In Peru it occurs between 400 and 800 m (1,300 and 2,600 ft).

== Behavior ==
=== Movement ===
The black-crowned antshrike is a year-round resident throughout its range.

=== Feeding ===
The black-crowned antshrike feeds on a wide variety of insects and other arthropods, and has been observed capturing small lizards. It usually forages singly or in pairs and almost always joins mixed-species feeding flocks that pass through its territory. It usually forages in the understorey and mid-storey but has been observed feeding as high as 22 m (70 ft). It forages methodically, by gleaning prey while perched, with short upward sallies, while briefly hovering, by chasing in mid-air, and by flipping over leaves on the ground. It takes prey from live and dead leaves and palm fronds, branches, vines, spiderwebs, and moss. It sometimes follows the edges of army ant swarms in its territory.

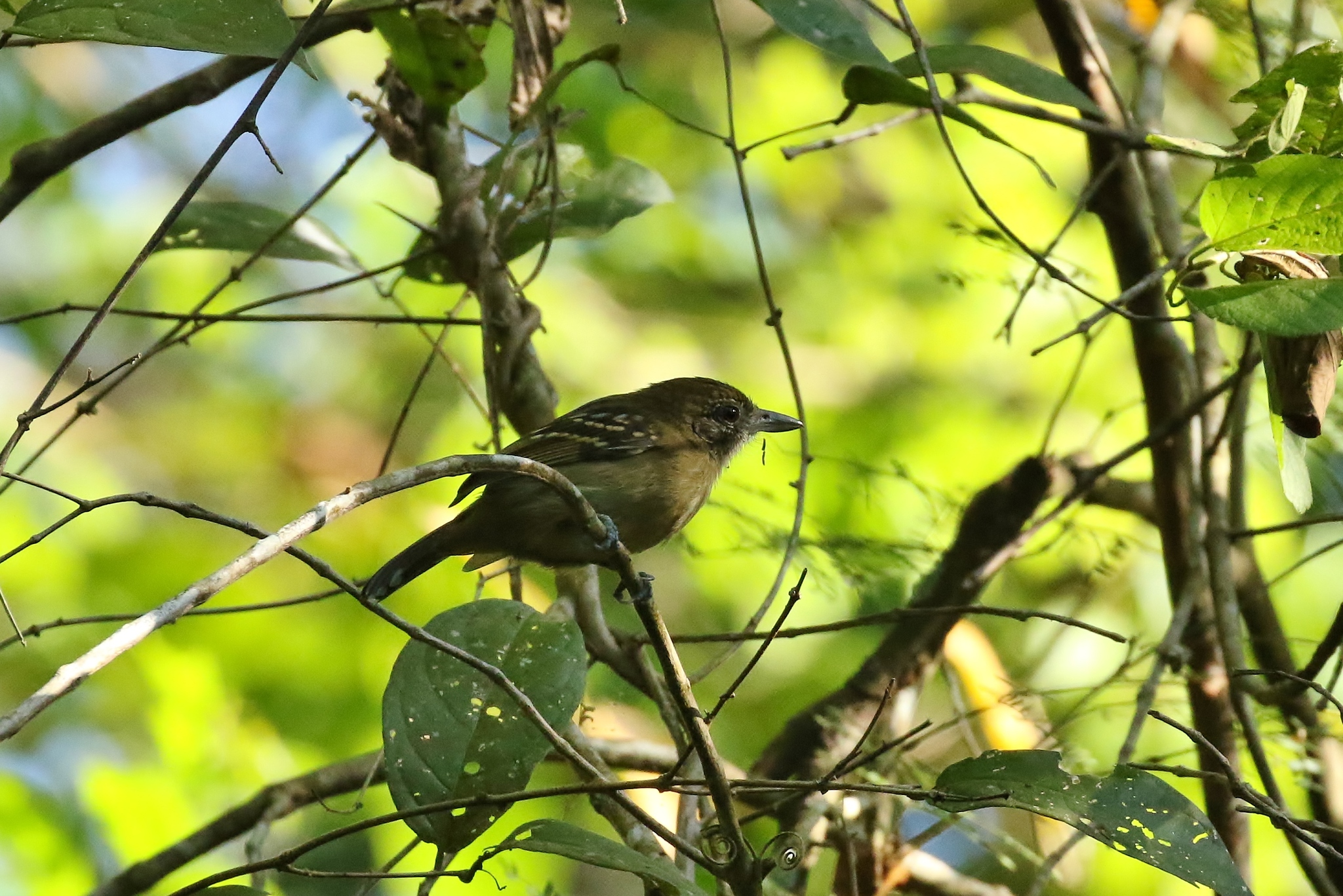
Female - Panama

=== Breeding ===
The black-crowned antshrike's breeding season varies geographically and from year to year. The peak season generally is between April and July. The nest is a cup woven from fungal rhizomorphs, moss, and sometimes rootlets and spider silk, and is lined with rhizomorphs. It is suspended by the rim from a branch fork up to about 7 m (23 ft) above the ground but more commonly within 2 m (7 ft) of it. The usual clutch size is two eggs and both parent incubate. The incubation period is 14 to 16 days and fledging occurs about 10 days after hatch. Both parents provision nestlings.

=== Vocalization ===
The black-crowned antshrike's most common song is "a series of uh notes ending with a single erk at a higher pitch". Both sexes sing, commonly in the morning but at any time of day. The song has been written as "wur wur wur-wur-wur-wur'wur'wur'wur; AH" and "anhanhanhanhanhanhanhanhanhánh". Its calls include "a 1–4-note (usually 2) caw arr-arr and a bark-rattle: arr-grr'r'r'r".

== Status ==
The IUCN has assessed the black-crowned antshrike as being of Least Concern. It has a very large range, and though its population size is not known it is believed to be stable. No immediate threats have been identified. It is considered fairly common to common across its range. "This species appears resilient, maintaining populations in forests where other understory insectivores have declined or gone extinct [but] the reluctance of many forest-interior birds to cross non-forest matrix, including Western Slaty-Antshrikes, may increase their vulnerability to habitat loss."
