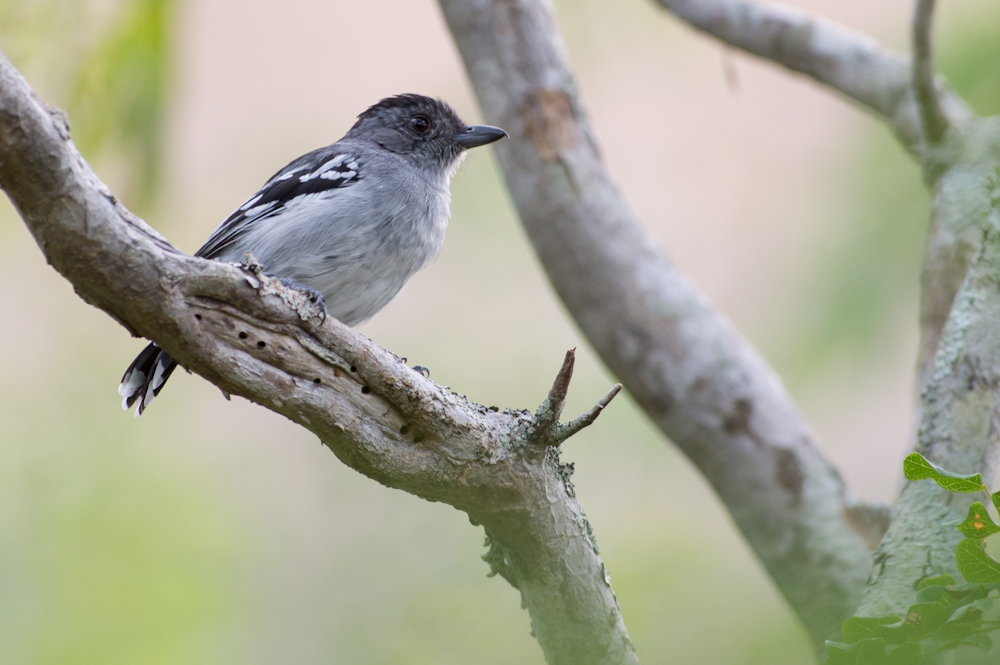

Conservation status
- Least Concern (IUCN 3.1)

Scientific classification
- Kingdom: Animalia
- Phylum: Chordata
- Class: Aves
- Order: Passeriformes
- Family: Thamnophilidae
- Genus: Thamnophilus
- Species: T. pelzelni

Binomial name
- Thamnophilus pelzelni Hellmayr, 1924

Synonyms
- Thamnophilus punctatus pelzelni

= Planalto slaty antshrike =

Species of bird

The planalto slaty antshrike (Thamnophilus pelzelni) is a species of bird in subfamily Thamnophilinae of family Thamnophilidae, the "typical antbirds". It is endemic to Brazil.

== Taxonomy and systematics ==
The planalto slaty antshrike was long treated as a subspecies of T. punctatus, which was then called the slaty antshrike. Following the results of a study published in 1997, the slaty antshrike was split into six species, of which the planalto slaty antshrike is one. To avoid confusion the remnant T. punctatus was given its present name of northern slaty antshrike.

The planalto slaty antshrike is monotypic.

== Description ==
The planalto slaty antshrike is about 14 cm (5.5 in) long and weighs 16 to 20 g (0.56 to 0.71 oz). Members of genus Thamnophilus are largish members of the antbird family; all have stout bills with a hook like those of true shrikes. This species exhibits significant sexual dimorphism. Adult males have a mixed black and gray forehead and a black crown. Their back is gray with a few black spots and a hidden white patch between their scapulars. Their face is gray. Their wings and wing coverts are brownish black with white spots and edges. Their tail is black with white tips and spots on the feathers. Their throat and belly are white and the latter often has a faint buff tinge. The rest of their underparts are gray. Adult females have a bright rufous crown and cinnamon-rufous upperparts, sometimes with a few black feather tips. Their wings are dark brown with white spots and edges and pale buff edges on the flight feathers. Their tail is dark brown with white tips on the feathers. Their underparts are light cinnamon-buff becoming almost white on the throat and belly.

== Distribution and habitat ==
The planalto slaty antshrike is found in central and eastern Brazil in a wide swath from eastern Maranhão, Ceará, and Paraíba southwest to northern Mato Grosso do Sul, extreme northern Paraná, and western São Paulo. In the northern part of its range it mostly inhabits deciduous and semi-deciduous forest, especially areas heavy with vines. In the southern and western parts it is mainly a bird of gallery forest. It also occurs locally in the edges of evergreen forest. In most of its range it occurs between 400 and 800 m (1,300 and 2,600 ft) of elevation and reaches 1,100 m (3,600 ft) in the central part. In all forest types it mainly keeps to the understorey to mid-storey.

== Behavior ==
=== Movement ===
The planalto slaty antshrike is presumed to be a year-round resident throughout its range.

=== Feeding ===
The planalto slaty antshrike's diet has not been detailed but is mostly insects and other arthropods. It usually forages singly, in pairs, or in small family groups, mostly between 1 and 5 m (3 and 16 ft) of the ground though sometimes as high as 15 m (49 ft). In general it feeds higher in areas with many vines than in other sites. It hops through vegetation, gleaning prey while reaching and lunging from a perch; it also makes short upward sallies and takes prey from the top of leaf litter on the ground. It takes prey from leaves, branches, and vines. It frequently joins mixed-species feeding flocks and has been observed following army ant swarms.

=== Breeding ===
The planalto slaty antshrike's breeding season has not been defined, but two active nests have been observed in October and one in January. The nests were cups suspended in a branch fork near the ground. Two contained two eggs and a third three eggs. Both parents incubated the eggs and provisioned the nestlings.

=== Vocalization ===
The planalto slaty antshrike's song is a "short, rising, cackling series, finishing as [a] rattle, the last note lower pitched". Its call is a "downslurred, cackling 'krrrruh' ".

== Status ==
The IUCN has assessed the planalto slaty antshrike as being of Least Concern. It has a very large range; its population size is not known and is believed to be decreasing. No immediate threats have been identified. It is considered common in most of its range, which includes several large protected areas. However, in the northeastern part of its range, its habitats are "largely unprotected and are being continually cleared for agricultural development and for cutting of firewood".
