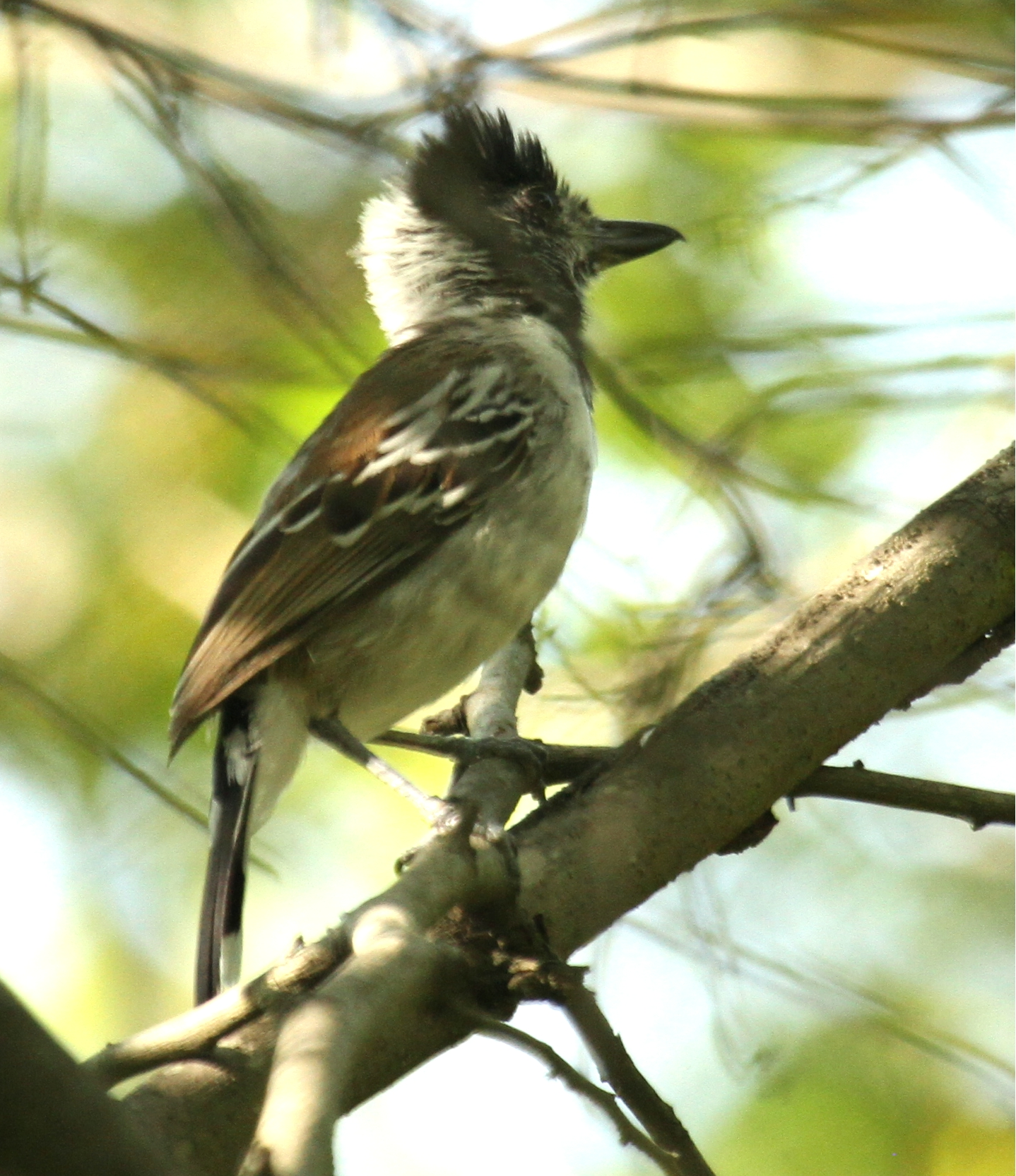

Conservation status
- Least Concern (IUCN 3.1)

- Vulnerable (IUCN 3.1)

Scientific classification
- Kingdom: Animalia
- Phylum: Chordata
- Class: Aves
- Order: Passeriformes
- Family: Thamnophilidae
- Genus: Thamnophilus
- Species: T. bernardi

Binomial name
- Thamnophilus bernardi Lesson, 1844

Synonyms
- Sakesphorus bernardi

= Collared antshrike =

Species of bird

The collared antshrike (Thamnophilus bernardi) is a species of bird in subfamily Thamnophilinae of family Thamnophilidae, the "typical antbirds". It is found in Ecuador and Peru.

== Taxonomy and systematics ==
The collared antshrike was described by the French naturalist René Lesson in 1844 and given the binomial name Thamnophilus bernardi (the genus was misspelled as Tamnophilus) with the type locality of Guayaquil in Ecuador. The specific epithet honors Captain Bernard, a French mariner and collector from Bordeaux. The collared antshrike was subsequently placed in the genus Sakesphorus. A molecular phylogenetic study published in 2007 found that Sakesphorus was polyphyletic and that three species including the collared antshrike were embedded within a clade containing members of Thamnophilus. The collared antshrike was therefore moved back to its original genus.

The collared antshrike's further taxonomy is unsettled. The South American Classification Committee of the American Ornithological Society, the International Ornithological Committee, and the Clements taxonomy assign it two subspecies, the nominate T. b. bernardi (Lesson, 1844) and T. b. shumbae (Carriker, 1934). Carriker described shumbae as a subspecies but BirdLife International's Handbook of the Birds of the World (HBW) treats it as a separate species, the "Maranon antshrike".

This article follows the one-species two-subspecies model.

== Description ==
The collared antshrike is 16.5 to 18 cm (6.5 to 7.1 in) long and weighs 30 to 38 g (1.1 to 1.3 oz). Members of genus Thamnophilus are largish members of the antbird family; all have stout bills with a hook like those of true shrikes. Both sexes of this species have a bushy crest. Adult males of the nominate subspecies have a black crown and crest; their forehead has white spots. Their lores are grayish white on an otherwise black face. They have a white collar that connects to the white underparts. Their upperparts are mostly dull rufous brown with a hidden white patch between the scapulars. Their wings are dark brown with white or buffy brown edges on the coverts and flight feathers. Their tail is black with white tips on the feathers and white edges on the outermost pair. Their throat is black with white scaling on its upper part and sides; the black extends onto the breast as a point. The rest of their underparts are mostly white with a buff wash on the flanks. Adult females have a black and white forehead, a dark rufous brown crest, and a black rear crown. (Some individuals have an almost entirely black crown.) Their face is dark gray with thin white streaks. Their collar is buff and like the male's connects to their upperparts. Their back is dark reddish brown with some white on the feather bases and wide white edges on the scapulars; their rump is a paler reddish brown than their back. Their wing coverts are dark brown or blackish with wide buff edges and tips; their flight feathers are brown with reddish brown edges. Their tail is dull rufous. Their throat is white or whitish buff with gray mottling and their breast and belly are buff. Immature males resemble adult females with the addition of a black patch on the center of the throat and upper breast. Both sexes have a chestnut brown iris, a black maxilla, a black-tipped blue-gray mandible, and blue-gray legs and feet.

Both sexes of subspecies T. b. shumbae differ from the nominate. Males have more white on the lores and face. Their upperparts are gray-brown. Their chin is white or pale gray with black only on the center of the lower throat and upper breast. Females are paler overall than the nominate, especially their underparts. Their crown is a brighter rufous than the nominate's, they have minimal black on their hindcrown, and their face has more white. The edges and tips of their wing coverts are white and their flight feathers have pale cinnamon edges. Their underparts are white with a pale buff wash on the breast and flanks. Their crissum is pale buff.

== Distribution and habitat ==
The collared antshrike has a disjunct distribution. The nominate subspecies has by far the larger range. It is found along the Pacific slope from west-central Ecuador's Manabí and Guayas provinces south into northwestern and north-central Peru as far as northern Ancash Department. Subspecies T. b. shumbae is found in north-central Peru in the watersheds of the Marañón River and its tributary the Chinchipe River. The species inhabits deciduous forest, arid scrublands, and shrubby secondary forest. In elevation it mostly ranges up to 1,500 m (4,900 ft) but locally to 1,850 m (6,100 ft) in Ecuador, to 1,200 m (3,900 ft) in western Peru, and to 1,950 m (6,400 ft) in the Marañón Valley.

== Behavior ==
=== Movement ===
The collared antshrike is a year-round resident throughout its range.

=== Feeding ===
The collared antshrike's diet is primarily insects and probably also includes other small invertebrates. It forages mostly in pairs and sometimes as part of a mixed-species feeding flock. It forages mostly on and near the ground, though it will feed as high as 10 m (33 ft) above it. It feeds by gleaning and often with quick stabs as well.

=== Breeding ===
The collared antshrike breeds between February and April in southwestern Ecuador; its season elsewhere is not known for certain but appears to span at least from February to May in Peru. Its nest is a deep cup loosely woven from dead grass and plant stems, and usually suspended in a branch fork 0.7 to 1.85 m (2 to 6 ft) above the ground. The clutch size is two to three eggs, and only the female is known to incubate although males are suspected to. The incubation period is about 14 to 16 days and fledging occurs 11 to 12 days after hatch. Other details of parental care are not known. The nests are known to be parasitized by shiny cowbirds (Molothrus bonariensis).

=== Vocalization ===
The two subspecies of the collared antshrike have different songs. That of the nominate is "a slow, accelerating, monotone series of deep barking notes: WUR-wur-wur-wur-wur-wur-WURL!". That of T. b. shumbae is "much faster with distinct introductory and terminal notes: WURKtr'r'r'r'r'r'r'r'r'r'r'r'r'rWURK!". The species' calls include "a distinctive 'ánk, ar-r-r-r-r-r' " and "a series of complaining or mewing caws: AWW aww aww awr" and "mewing whines".

== Status ==
The IUCN follows HBW taxonomy and so has separately assessed the collared antshrike's two subspecies, treating them as species. Subspecies T. b. bernardi is assessed as being of Least Concern. It has a large range; its population size is not known but is believed to be stable. No immediate threats have been identified. Subspecies T. b. shumbae is assessed as Vulnerable. It has a small range and its estimated population of between 600 and 6000 mature individuals is believed to be decreasing. "The only threat that is possibly affecting the species is the loss and degradation of its habitat, though it appears to tolerate habitat conversion and degradation." It is considered common in Ecuador and fairly common to common in Peru.

== See also ==
- Fauna of Peru
