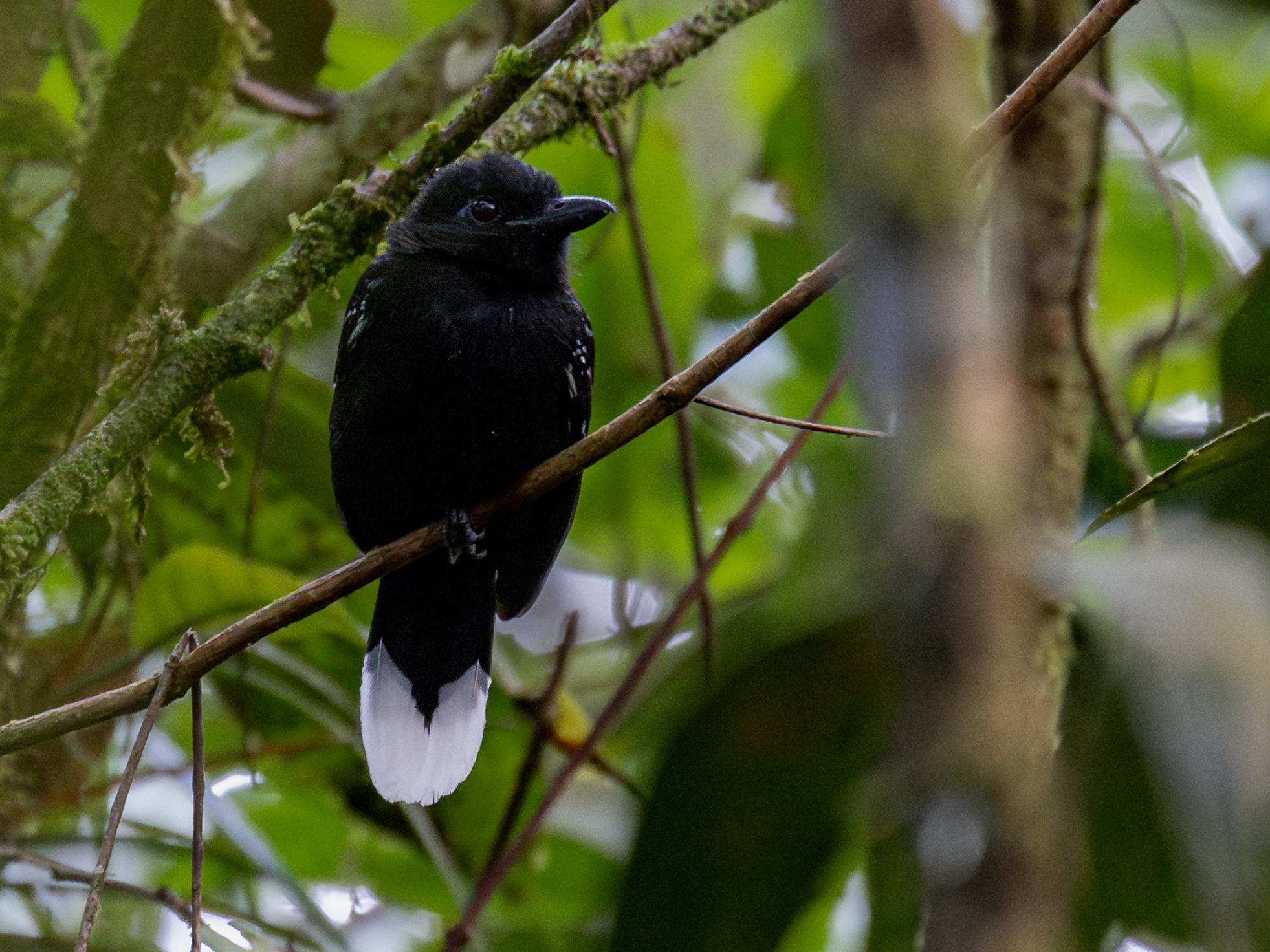
- Male

Conservation status
- Least Concern (IUCN 3.1)

Scientific classification
- Kingdom: Animalia
- Phylum: Chordata
- Class: Aves
- Order: Passeriformes
- Family: Thamnophilidae
- Genus: Thamnophilus
- Species: T. melanothorax

Binomial name
- Thamnophilus melanothorax Sclater, PL, 1857

Synonyms
- Sakesphorus melanothorax

= Band-tailed antshrike =

Species of bird

The band-tailed antshrike (Thamnophilus melanothorax) is a species of bird in subfamily Thamnophilinae of family Thamnophilidae, the "typical antbirds". It is found in Brazil, French Guiana, Guyana, and Suriname.

== Taxonomy and systematics ==
The band-tailed antshrike was described by the English zoologist Philip Sclater in 1857 and given the binomial name Thamnophilus melanothorax. It was subsequently placed in the genus Sakesphorus. A molecular phylogenetic study published in 2007 found that Sakesphorus was polyphyletic and that three species including the band-tailed antshrike were embedded within a clade containing members of Thamnophilus. The band-tailed antshrike was therefore moved back to its original genus.

The band-tailed antshrike is monotypic.

== Description ==
The band-tailed antshrike is 16 to 17 cm (6.3 to 6.7 in) long; one individual weighed 31 g (1.1 oz). Members of genus Thamnophilus are largish members of the antbird family; all have stout bills with a hook like those of true shrikes. Adult males are almost entirely black except for a hidden white patch between the scapulars, small white spots on the wing coverts, and the eponymous wide white band at the end of the tail. Adult females have a bright deep rufous crown, upperparts, wings, and tail. Their face, throat, and breast are black. The rest of their underparts are gray with a reddish brown cast on the flanks and crissum.

== Distribution and habitat ==
The band-tailed antshrike is found from southern Guyana across Suriname and French Guiana and into northeastern Brazil's Amapá state; there is also one good sight record near Manaus in Brazil's Amazonas state. It primarily inhabits the understorey of evergreen forest though it also occurs higher into the mid-storey. It favors dense vines and other vegetation growing in gaps made by fallen trees and abandoned human-made openings. It also occurs in swampy depressions and in dense riverside thickets. In elevation it ranges from near sea level to 550 m (1,800 ft).

== Behavior ==
=== Movement ===
The band-tailed antshrike is thought to be a year-round resident throughout its range.

=== Feeding ===
The band-tailed antshrike's diet is not well known but is assumed to be insects and other small arthropods. It forages singly or in pairs and seldom as part of a mixed-species feeding flock. It forages mostly in dense cover on and near the ground up to about 10 m (35 ft) high. It feeds by gleaning from vegetation, vines, branches, and the ground.

=== Breeding ===
Nothing is known about the band-tailed antshrike's breeding biology.

=== Vocalization ===
The band-tailed antshrike's song is a "slow, slightly accelerating series of 7-9 low, hollow 'ah' notes". Its call is "a muffled, nasal growl, sometimes doubled".

== Status ==
The IUCN has assessed the band-tailed antshrike as being of Least Concern. It has a large range; its population size is not known and is believed to be decreasing. No immediate threats have been identified. It "[a]ppears to be a rare, low-density species throughout its range" but "there would appear to be large intact areas of potentially suitable habitat remaining in Surinam [sic], French Guiana and Brazil (Amapá)".
