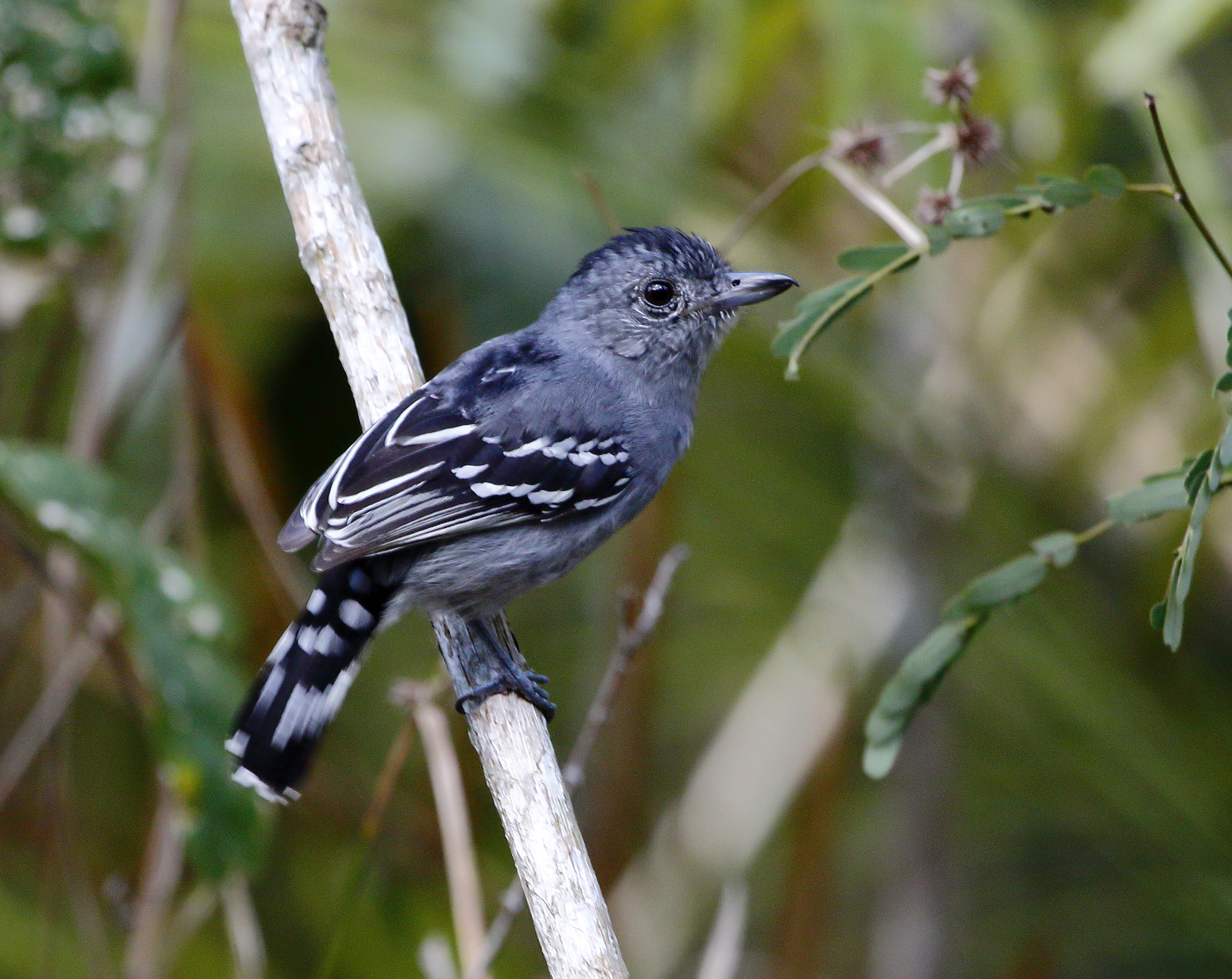

Conservation status
- Least Concern (IUCN 3.1)

Scientific classification
- Kingdom: Animalia
- Phylum: Chordata
- Class: Aves
- Order: Passeriformes
- Family: Thamnophilidae
- Genus: Thamnophilus
- Species: T. ambiguus

Binomial name
- Thamnophilus ambiguus Swainson, 1825

Synonyms
- Thamnophilus punctatus ambiguus

= Sooretama slaty antshrike =

Species of bird in Brazil

The Sooretama slaty antshrike (Thamnophilus ambiguus) is a species of bird in subfamily Thamnophilinae of family Thamnophilidae, the "typical antbirds". It is endemic to Brazil.

== Taxonomy and systematics ==
The Sooretama slaty antshrike was described by the English naturalist William Swainson in 1825 and given its current binomial name Thamnophilus ambiguus. It was later treated as a subspecies of T. punctatus, which was then called the slaty antshrike. Following the results of a study published in 1997, the slaty antshrike was split into six species, of which the Sooretama slaty antshrike is one. To avoid confusion the remnant T. punctatus was given its present name of northern slaty antshrike.

The Sooretama slaty antshrike is monotypic.

== Description ==
The Sooretama slaty antshrike is 14 to 15 cm (5.5 to 5.9 in) long. Members of genus Thamnophilus are largish members of the antbird family; all have stout bills with a hook like those of true shrikes. This species exhibits significant sexual dimorphism. Adult males have a black forehead and crown with a few gray spots on the former. Their back is gray with a black spot in the middle and a hidden white patch between the scapulars. Their face is gray. Their wings and wing coverts are black with white spots and edges. Their tail is black with white tips and spots on the feathers. Their underparts are gray that is often whiter on the throat and belly. Adult females have a warm tawny-brown crown. Their back is olive-gray with a clay-colored tinge and a few black feather tips. Their wings are dark brown with white spots and edges and pale clay edges on the flight feathers. Their tail is dark brown with white tips and spots on the feathers. Their underparts are mixed clay and smoke-gray and are whiter on the throat and belly.

== Distribution and habitat ==
The Sooretama slaty antshrike is found in southeastern Brazil coastally from southern Sergipe to Rio de Janeiro state and inland up the Doce River valley in Minas Gerais. It inhabits the understorey to mid-storey of evergreen forest, woodlands on sandy soil, and nearby secondary forest. It everywhere favors the forest edge and gaps within it caused by fallen trees. In elevation it occurs from sea level to 700 m (2,300 ft).

== Behavior ==
=== Movement ===
The Sooretama slaty antshrike is presumed to be a year-round resident throughout its range.

=== Feeding ===
The Sooretama slaty antshrike's diet has not been detailed but is mostly insects and other arthropods. It usually forages singly, in pairs, or in small family groups, mostly between 1 and 10 m (3 and 33 ft) of the ground though sometimes as high as 25 m (82 ft). It hops through thickets and vine tangles, gleaning prey from leaves, branches, and vines while reaching and lunging from a perch; it also makes short upward sallies and takes prey from leaf litter on the ground. It often joins mixed-species feeding flocks and has only seldom been observed following army ant swarms.

=== Breeding ===
The Sooretama slaty antshrike's breeding season has not been defined, but recently fledged young have been seen in November. Its nest is a cup suspended in a branch fork. The clutch size, incubation period, time to fledging, and details of parental care are not known.

=== Vocalization ===
The Sooretama slaty antshrike's song is a "cackling series, starting high and rising, then finishing as a short, sometimes descending rattle". Its call is a "level high, cackling 'witwitwit' or 'witrrr' ".

== Status ==
The IUCN has assessed the Sooretama slaty antshrike as being of Least Concern. Its population size is not known and is believed to be stable. No immediate threats have been identified. It is considered fairly common and occurs in several protected areas. Among them is its namesake Sooretama Biological Reserve, "an important focal point for the conservation of lowland east Brazilian avifauna".
