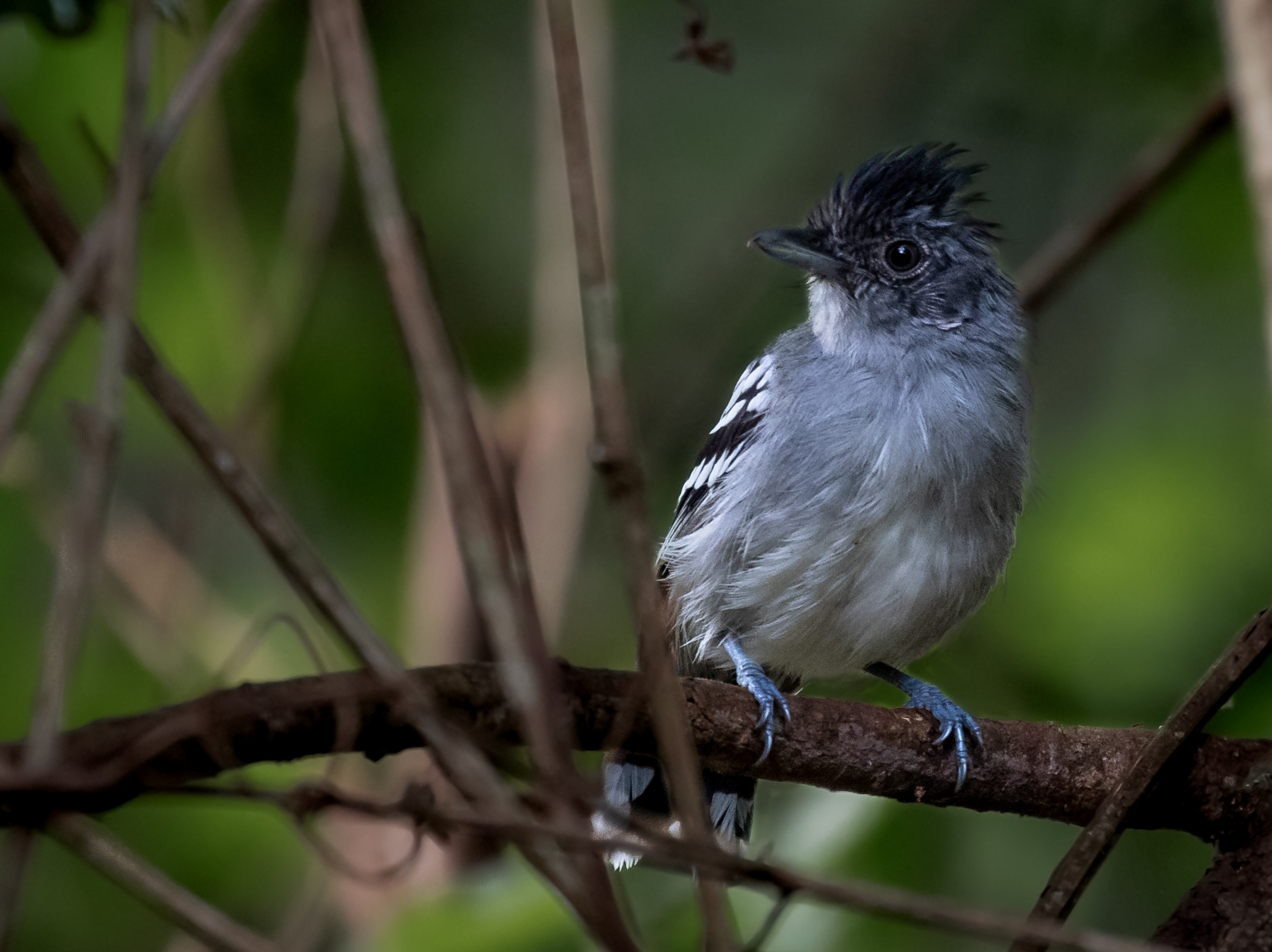
- Male
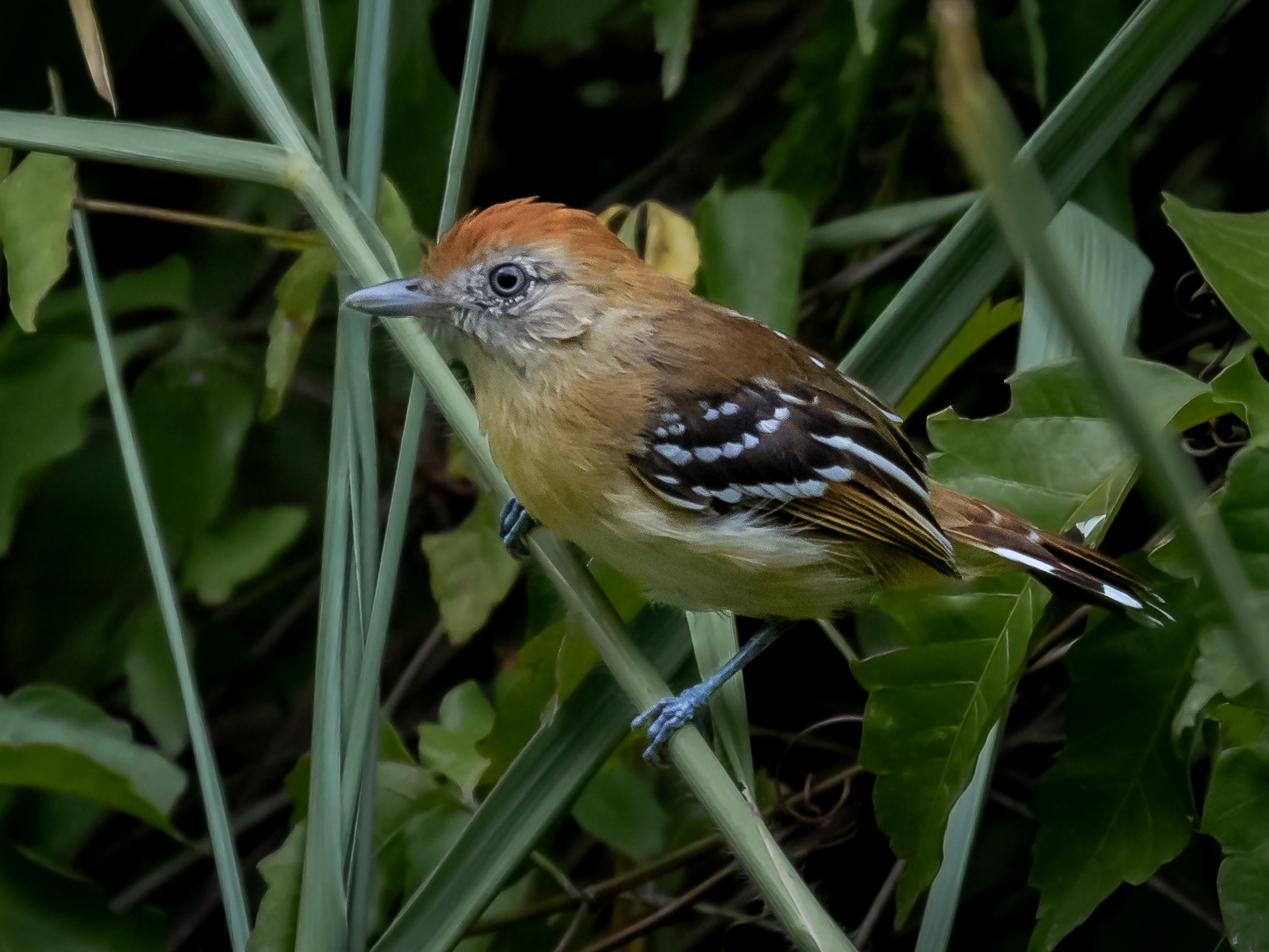
- Female

Conservation status
- Least Concern (IUCN 3.1)

Scientific classification
- Kingdom: Animalia
- Phylum: Chordata
- Class: Aves
- Order: Passeriformes
- Family: Thamnophilidae
- Genus: Thamnophilus
- Species: T. sticturus

Binomial name
- Thamnophilus sticturus Pelzeln, 1868

Synonyms
- Thamnophilus punctatus sticturus

= Bolivian slaty antshrike =

Species of bird

The Bolivian slaty antshrike (Thamnophilus sticturus) is a species of bird in subfamily Thamnophilinae of family Thamnophilidae, the "typical antbirds". It is found in Bolivia, Brazil, and Paraguay.

== Taxonomy and systematics ==
The Bolivian slaty antshrike was described by the Austrian ornithologist August von Pelzeln in 1868 and given its current binomial name Thamnophilus sticturus. It was later treated as a subspecies of T. punctatus, which was then called the slaty antshrike. Following the results of a study published in 1997, the slaty antshrike was split into six species, of which the Bolivian slaty antshrike is one. To avoid confusion the remnant T. punctatus was given its present name of northern slaty antshrike.

The Bolivian slaty antshrike is monotypic.

== Description ==
The Bolivian slaty antshrike is about 14 cm (5.5 in) long and weighs 18 to 20 g (0.63 to 0.71 oz). Members of genus Thamnophilus are largish members of the antbird family; all have stout bills with a hook like those of true shrikes. This species exhibits significant sexual dimorphism. Adult males have a gray forehead and a black crown. Their back is gray with a few black spots and a hidden white patch between their scapulars. Their face is gray. Their wings, scapulars, and wing coverts are black with white spots and edges. Their tail is black with white tips and spots on the feathers. Their underparts are light gray with much white on the belly. Adult females have a bright reddish-brown crown and yellowish olive-brown upperparts. Their wings are dark brown with white spots and edges on the scapulars and pale buff edges on the flight feathers. Their tail is dark brown with white tips and spots on the feathers. Their underparts are white in the center and light yellowish brown across the breast and on the sides, flanks, and crissum.

== Distribution and habitat ==
The Bolivian slaty antshrike is found in the central Bolivian departments of Beni, Cochabamba, and Santa Cruz, in adjoining extreme western parts of the Brazilian the states of Mato Grosso and Mato Grosso do Sul, and in far northern Paraguay's Alto Paraguay department. It inhabits the understorey to mid-storey of dry semi-deciduous forest, gallery forest, larger areas of more humid forest, and secondary forest. In elevation it reaches 600 m (2,000 ft) in Brazil and 950 m (3,100 ft) in Bolivia.

== Behavior ==
=== Movement ===
The Bolivian slaty antshrike is presumed to be a year-round resident throughout its range.

=== Feeding ===
The diet of the Bolivian slaty antshrike has not been detailed but is assumed to be arthropods. It usually forages singly or in pairs. It usually forages in the understorey to mid-storey, mostly between 1 and 7 m (3 and 23 ft) of the ground. It hops through vegetation, gleaning prey while reaching from a perch; it also makes short upward sallies. It takes prey from leaves, branches, and vines. It is not known to join mixed-species feeding flocks or follow army ant swarms.

=== Breeding ===
Nothing is known about the Bolivian slaty antshrike's breeding biology.

=== Vocalization ===
The Bolivian slaty antshrike's song is "a series starting slowly and speeding up into rattling trill, rises in frequency and intensity, reaching peak near end of trill, then falls off". Its call is "a 'caw' note" of variable length that sometimes becomes a "harsh, downward inflected growl".

== Status ==
The IUCN has assessed the Bolivian slaty antshrike as being of Least Concern. Its population size and trend are not known. No immediate threats have been identified. It is considered locally fairly common though its range is rather small. "[T]his region lacks large protected areas and has recently come under increased logging pressure."
