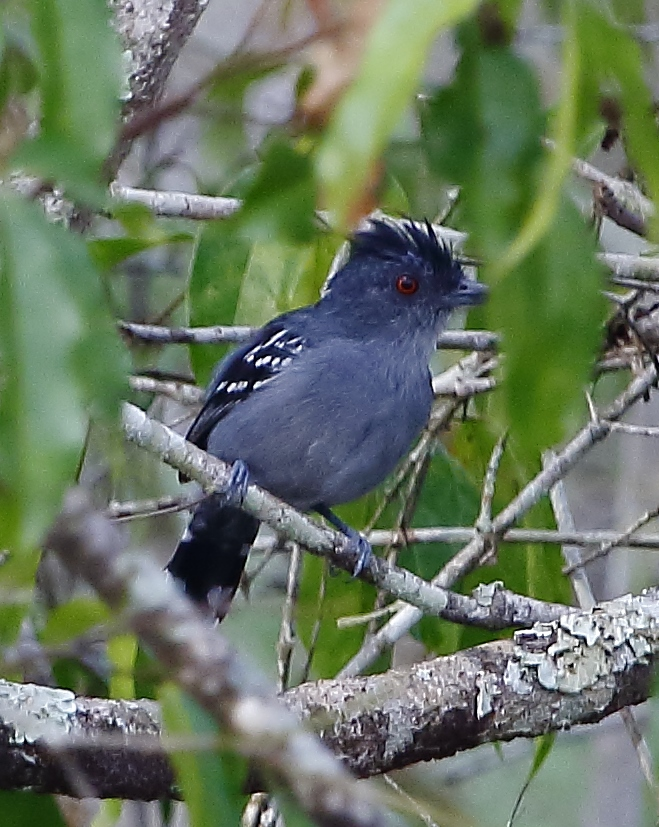

Conservation status
- Least Concern (IUCN 3.1)

Scientific classification
- Kingdom: Animalia
- Phylum: Chordata
- Class: Aves
- Order: Passeriformes
- Family: Thamnophilidae
- Genus: Thamnophilus
- Species: T. stictocephalus

Binomial name
- Thamnophilus stictocephalus Pelzeln, 1868

Synonyms
- Thamnophilus punctatus stictocephalus

= Natterer's slaty antshrike =

Species of bird

Natterer's slaty antshrike (Thamnophilus stictocephalus) is a species of bird in subfamily Thamnophilinae of family Thamnophilidae, the "typical antbirds". It is found in Bolivia and Brazil.

== Taxonomy and systematics ==
Natterer's slaty antshrike was described by the Austrian ornithologist August von Pelzeln in 1868 and given its current binomial name Thamnophilus stictocephalus.

Natterer's slaty antshrike has two subspecies, the nominate T. s. stictocephalus (Pelzeln, 1868) and T. s. parkeri (Isler, ML, Isler, PR & Whitney, 1997). The nominate subspecies previously had long been treated as a subspecies of T. punctatus, which was then called the slaty antshrike. Following the results of a study published in 1997, the slaty antshrike was split into six species. One of them is Natterer's slaty antshrike; the same study determined that the former T. p. stictocephalus was actually the two subspecies that make up Natterer's. To avoid confusion the remnant T. punctatus was given its present name of northern slaty antshrike.

== Description ==
Natterer's slaty antshrike is 14 to 15 cm (5.5 to 5.9 in) long and weighs 19 to 22 g (0.67 to 0.78 oz). Members of genus Thamnophilus are largish members of the antbird family; all have stout bills with a hook like those of true shrikes. This species exhibits significant sexual dimorphism. Adult males of the nominate subspecies have a black forehead with gray spots and a black crown. Their back is mixed black and gray with a hidden white patch between their scapulars. Their face is gray. Their wings and wing coverts are black with white spots and edges. Their tail is black with white tips on the feathers. Their underparts are gray with a whitish belly. Adult females have a rufous crown and reddish yellow-brown upperparts with dark brown scapulars. Their wings are dark brown with white spots on the coverts and clay colored edges on the flight feathers. Their tail is dark brown with white tips on the feathers. Their underparts are a mix of light clay and light gray that is paler on the throat and belly. Males of subspecies T. s. parkeri have a gray forehead, a gray back with a few black spots, and paler underparts than the nominate; their belly center is white. Females have less reddish upperparts than the nominate.

== Distribution and habitat ==
The nominate subspecies of Natterer's slaty antshrike is found in Brazil south of the Amazon between the Madeira and Tocantins rivers and southwest into Rondônia and northern and western Mato Grosso Brazilian states and northern Beni Department in extreme northern Bolivia. Subspecies T. s. parkeri is found only in the Serranía de Huanchaca in extreme northeastern Bolivia's Santa Cruz Department. The species inhabits different landscapes across its range. Along the Amazon it mostly occurs in patches of forest on white-sand soil, on the edges of humid evergreen forest, and in forest clearings such as those caused by fallen trees. At the southern end of its Brazilian range it occurs in semi-deciduous forest and gallery forest. In the Serranía de Huanchaca it occurs on the edges of evergreen forest within grasslands and cerrado. In elevation it ranges from near sea level to 700 m (2,300 ft).

== Behavior ==
=== Movement ===
Natterer's slaty antshrike is presumed to be a year-round resident throughout its range.

=== Feeding ===
The diet of Natterer's slaty antshrike has not been detailed but includes insects and other arthropods. It usually forages singly or in pairs and is not known to join mixed-species feeding flocks. It usually forages in the understorey to mid-storey, mostly between 1 and 10 m (3 and 33 ft) of the ground. It hops through vegetation, gleaning prey while reaching or lunging from a perch; it also makes short upward sallies. It takes prey from leaves, branches, and vines. It occasionally follows army ant swarms in its territory.

=== Breeding ===
Nothing is known about the breeding biology of Natterer's slaty antshrike.

=== Vocalization ===
The song of Natterer's slaty antshrike is a "series of level, nasal notes, starting slowly, but accelerating to a level, bouncing rattle (3-4 sec)". Its calls include "short and long 'caw' notes" and an "abrupt growl".

== Status ==
The IUCN has assessed Natterer's slaty antshrike as being of Least Concern. It has a large range; its population size is not known and is believed to be decreasing. No immediate threats have been identified. It is considered locally fairly common across its range and occurs in large protected areas in both countries. "[S]ubstantial populations exist within humid-forest regions that are largely intact and under no threat of development."
