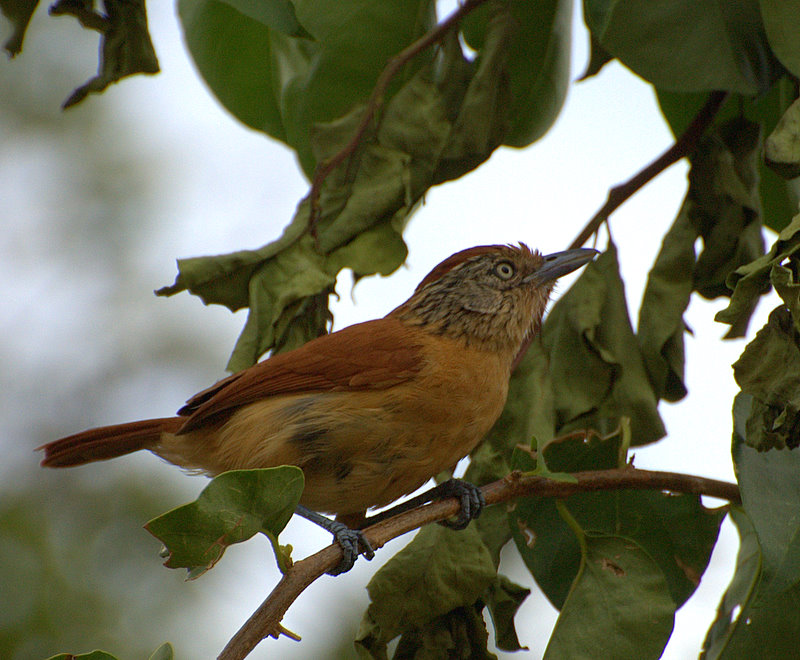
- female barred antshrike (Thamnophilus doliatus)

Scientific classification
- Kingdom: Animalia
- Phylum: Chordata
- Class: Aves
- Order: Passeriformes
- Family: Thamnophilidae
- Genus: Thamnophilus; Vieillot, 1816

Type species
- Lanius doliatus Linnaeus, 1766

Species
- see text.

= Thamnophilus =

Genus of birds

Thamnophilus is a genus of antbird in the antbird family, Thamnophilidae. The species in this genus are commonly known as antshrikes. They are insectivores that feed by gleaning prey from foliage and are found in the Neotropics.

The genus Thamnophilus was introduced by the French ornithologist Louis Pierre Vieillot in 1816. The name combines the Ancient Greek words thamnos "bush" and philos "loving". The type species was subsequently designated as the barred antshrike.

The genus contains the following species:

Image	Common name	Scientific name	Distribution
	Collared antshrike	Thamnophilus bernardi	southwestern Ecuador to north-central Peru
	Black-backed antshrike	Thamnophilus melanonotus	northern Colombia/Venezuela
	Band-tailed antshrike	Thamnophilus melanothorax	eastern Guiana Shield
	Barred antshrike	Thamnophilus doliatus	central and South America
	Chapman's antshrike	Thamnophilus zarumae	Tumbes
	Bar-crested antshrike	Thamnophilus multistriatus	Colombian Andes
	Chestnut-backed antshrike	Thamnophilus palliatus	southern Amazonia and Atlantic Forest
	Lined antshrike	Thamnophilus tenuepunctatus	eastern slope of northern Andes
	Black-hooded antshrike	Thamnophilus bridgesi	southern Costa Rica/Panama
	Black antshrike	Thamnophilus nigriceps	northern Colombia and Darién Gap
	Cocha antshrike	Thamnophilus praecox	northeastern Ecuador
	Blackish-grey antshrike	Thamnophilus nigrocinerus	Amazonia
	Castelnau's antshrike	Thamnophilus cryptoleucus	riverine Amazonia
	White-shouldered antshrike	Thamnophilus aethiops	Amazonia
	Uniform antshrike	Thamnophilus unicolor	northern Andes
	Upland antshrike	Thamnophilus aroyae	Puna grassland
	Plain-winged antshrike	Thamnophilus schistaceus	Amazonia
	Mouse-colored antshrike	Thamnophilus murinus	Amazonia
	Black-crowned antshrike	Thamnophilus atrinucha	Central America, northern Colombia and El Chocó
	Northern slaty antshrike	Thamnophilus punctatus	Guiana Shield and northern Andes
	Natterer's slaty antshrike	Thamnophilus strictocephalus	southeastern Amazonia
	Bolivian slaty antshrike	Thamnophilus structurus	eastern Bolivia
	Planalto slaty antshrike	Thamnophilus pelzelni	Brazil
	Sooretama slaty antshrike	Thamnophilus ambiguous	Atlantic Forest
	Acre antshrike	Thamnophilus divisorius	Acre and eastern Peru
	Streak-backed antshrike	Thamnophilus insignis	Tepuis
	Amazonian antshrike	Thamnophilus amazonicus	Amazonia
	Variable antshrike	Thamnophilus caerulescens	eastern Andean slope and centre/eastern South America
	Rufous-winged antshrike	Thamnophilus torquatus	Brazil
	Rufous-capped antshrike	Thamnophilus ruficapillus	Puna grassland and eastern South America
