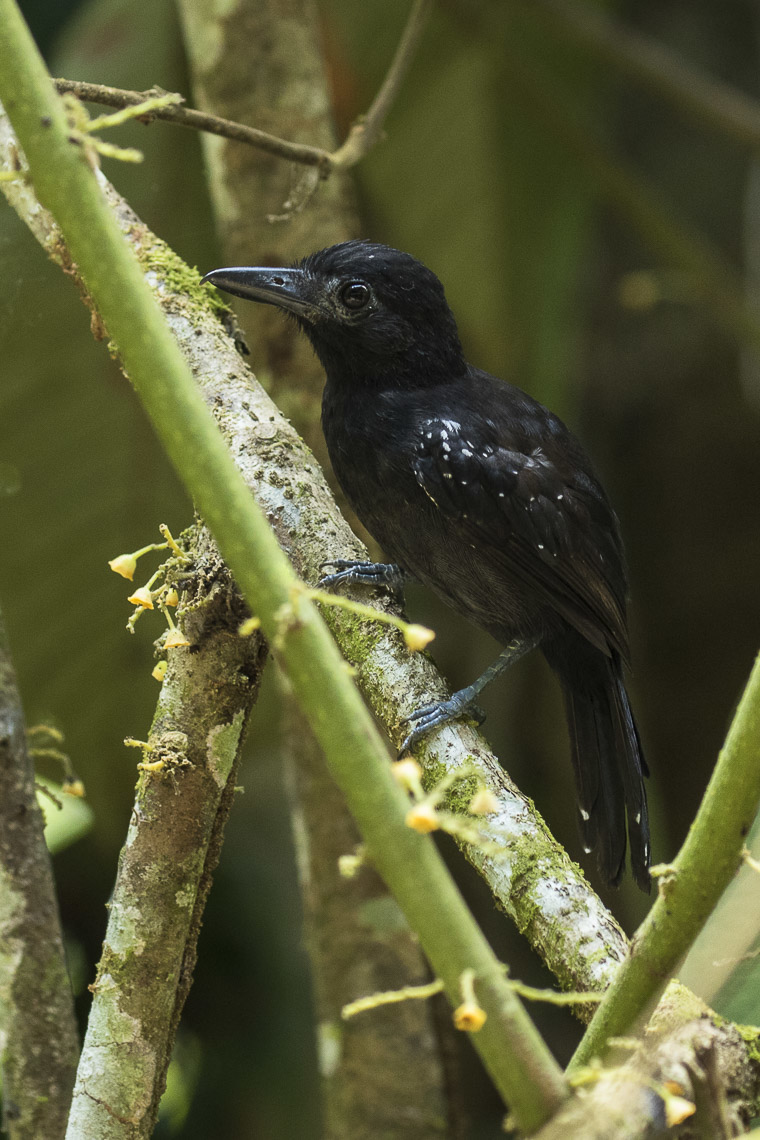
- Male
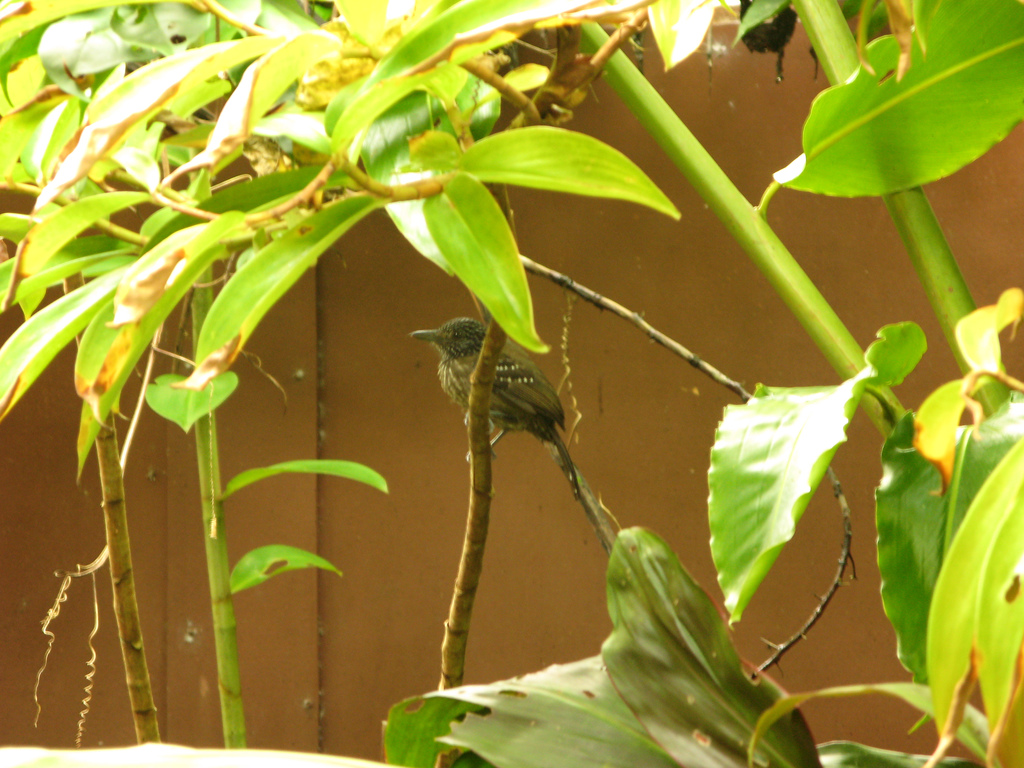
- Female

Conservation status
- Least Concern (IUCN 3.1)

Scientific classification
- Kingdom: Animalia
- Phylum: Chordata
- Class: Aves
- Order: Passeriformes
- Family: Thamnophilidae
- Genus: Thamnophilus
- Species: T. bridgesi

Binomial name
- Thamnophilus bridgesi Sclater, PL, 1856

= Black-hooded antshrike =

Species of bird

The black-hooded antshrike (Thamnophilus bridgesi) is a species of bird in subfamily Thamnophilinae of family Thamnophilidae, the "typical antbirds". It is found in Costa Rica and Panama.

== Taxonomy and systematics ==
The black-hooded antshrike was described by the English zoologist Philip Sclater in 1856 and given its current binomial name Thamnophilus bridgesi. The specific epithet honors a Mr. Bridges who collected the holotype. (Sclater did not publish Bridges' given name.)

The black-hooded antshrike is monotypic.

== Description ==
The black-hooded antshrike is 15 to 17 cm (5.9 to 6.7 in) long and weighs 26 to 27 g (0.92 to 0.95 oz). Members of genus Thamnophilus are largish members of the antbird family; all have stout bills with a hook like those of true shrikes. This species exhibits some sexual dimorphism. Adult males are mostly black. They have a white patch between their scapulars, small white dots on their wing coverts, and dark gray belly and undertail coverts. Adult females have blackish gray forehead, crown, and face with narrow white streaks. Their upperparts and wings are very dark grayish brown with white-edged scapulars and white-spotted wing coverts. Their tail is blackish brown with white spots on the outer feathers. Their underparts are olive that is darker at the upper end, and with white streaks on the throat, breast, and belly. Juveniles are similar to adult but browner with larger white spots on the wing coverts. Subadult males resemble adults but are more brownish and with white streaks on their breast.

== Distribution and habitat ==
The black-hooded antshrike is found from southern Guanacaste Province in Costa Rica south on the Pacific slope through western Panama as far as Los Santos Province. It inhabits the edges of lowland evergreen forest, semi-deciduous forest, gallery forest, taller secondary woodland, and mangroves. It generally stays from the understorey to the mid-storey, favoring shrubby areas and vine tangles. It does occur in the interior of gallery forest. In elevation it mostly occurs below 1,000 m (3,300 ft) but ranges as high as 1,200 m (3,900 ft) in Costa Rica.

== Behavior ==
=== Movement ===
The black-hooded antshrike is presumed to be a year-round resident throughout its range.

=== Feeding ===
The black-hooded antshrike's diet is not known in detail but includes a variety insects and also other arthropods like spiders. It usually forages singly or in pairs and often joins mixed-species feeding flocks. It forages sluggishly in dense vegetation from near the ground to about 15 m (50 ft) above it. It hops between branches to glean prey with quick stabs and lunges from leaves, stems, branches, and trunks. In drier areas it commonly forages on the ground, probing and flipping leaf litter. It occasionally follows army ant swarms to capture prey fleeing the ants.

=== Breeding ===
The black-hooded antshrike breeds between February and September in Costa Rica; its season in Panama has not been defined. Its nest is a fairly large cup constructed of fine rootlets and other fibers and often with green moss on the outside. It is typically attached with cobwebs by its rim in a branch fork between about 0.6 and 3.6 m (2 and 12 ft) above the ground amid foliage. The clutch size is two eggs. The incubation period is 14 to 15 days; the time to fledging is not known. Both parents incubate during the day and the female alone at night, and both parents provision nestlings.

=== Vocalization ===
Garrigues and Dean describe the black-hooded antshrike's song as "an accelerating series of staccato notes that end in a longer, lower note". VanPerlo describes it as a "high wooden wekwekwekkerwikkerwek, varied in speed and length". Its call is "an extended, complaining note, usually repeated 2–3 times".

== Status ==
The IUCN has assessed the black-hooded antshrike as being of Least Concern. It has a large range and an estimated population of at least 50,000 mature individuals; the latter is believed to be decreasing. No immediate threats have been identified. It is considered rare in northern Costa Rica and common in the southern part of the country. "Although seemingly capable of persisting in disturbed habitats, it has gradually disappeared from much of its now deforested former range in Panama." It occurs in several protected areas in Costa Rica which "should, with continued protection, support an adequate population of this species".
