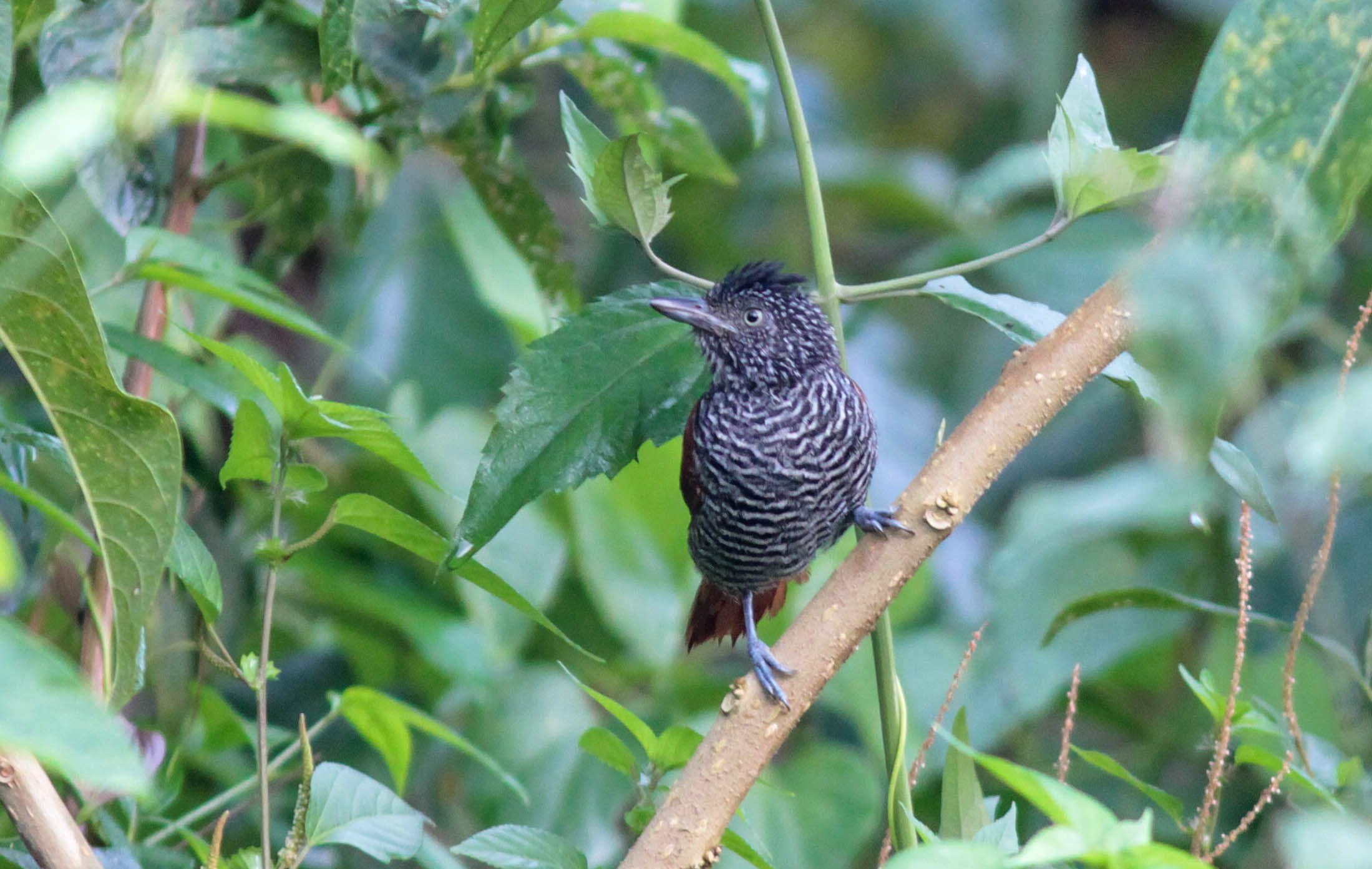
- male

Conservation status
- Least Concern (IUCN 3.1)

Scientific classification
- Kingdom: Animalia
- Phylum: Chordata
- Class: Aves
- Order: Passeriformes
- Family: Thamnophilidae
- Genus: Thamnophilus
- Species: T. palliatus

Binomial name
- Thamnophilus palliatus (Lichtenstein, MHC, 1823)

= Chestnut-backed antshrike =

Species of bird

The chestnut-backed antshrike (Thamnophilus palliatus) is a species of bird in subfamily Thamnophilinae of family Thamnophilidae, the "typical antbirds". It is found in Bolivia, Brazil, and Peru.

== Taxonomy and systematics ==
The chestnut-backed antshrike has these four subspecies:

- T. p. palliatus (Lichtenstein, MHC, 1823)
- T. p. vestitus (Lesson, RP, 1831)
- T. p. puncticeps Sclater, PL, 1890
- T. p. similis Zimmer, JT, 1933

What is now the lined antshrike (T. tenuepunctatus) was previously treated by several authors as a subspecies of the chestnut-backed antshrike. A study published in 2007 confirmed that the lined antshrike is a full species and sister to the chestnut-backed.

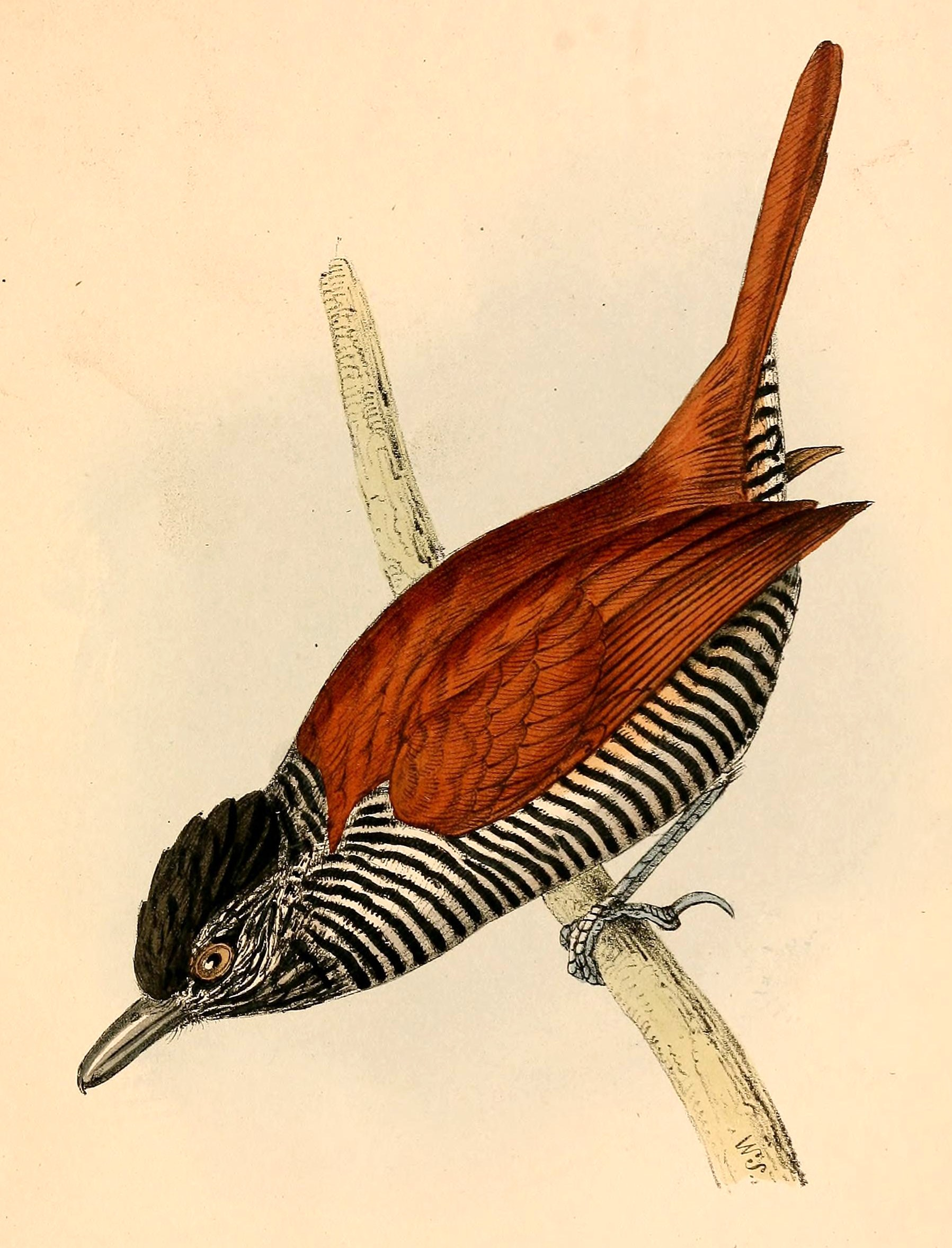
Thamnophilus palliatus illustration by Swainson, 1841

== Description ==
The lined antshrike is 16 to 17 cm (6.3 to 6.7 in) long and weighs 26 to 28 g (0.92 to 0.99 oz). Members of genus Thamnophilus are largish members of the antbird family; all have stout bills with a hook like those of true shrikes. This species exhibits some sexual dimorphism though both sexes have a crest. Adult males of the nominate subspecies T. p. palliatus have a black crown with white spots on the forehead. Their face and nape are black with white spots. Their upperparts, wings, and tail are rufous-brown. Their throat has black and white stripes and the rest of their underparts are barred black and white with a rufous tinge on the flanks. Adult females are very like males but have a deep rufous-brown crown and wider white bars on their underparts. Adults of both sexes have a pale iris that is variable in color. Subadult males resemble adult males with a mix of black and deep reddish brown on their forehead and a reddish-brown tinge on their lower underparts. Subadult females resemble adults with narrower black bars on their underparts and a strong yellow-ochre wash on their lower underparts.

Subspecies T. p. similis is similar to the nominate. Both sexes of subspecies T. p. puncticeps are paler overall than the nominate, and females have a strong yellow-ochre wash on their nape. Subspecies T. p. vestitus has even paler upperparts than puncticeps and wider dark bars on their underparts than the other three subspecies.

== Distribution and habitat ==
The chestnut-backed antshrike has a disjunct distribution. Subspecies T. p. vestitus is found separately from the other three, in coastal eastern Brazil from southern Bahia south to Rio de Janeiro state and with a few records in São Paulo state. Subspecies T. p. puncticeps is the most widespread. It is found in southeastern Peru's Cuzco and Puno departments, across northern Bolivia, and in Brazil south of the Amazon east to the Tapajós River. The nominate subspecies T. p. palliatus is found in Brazil south of the Amazon from the Tapajós east to the Atlantic between Paraíba and northern Bahia. Subspecies T. p. similis is found in central Peru between the departments of Huánuco and Junín.

The chestnut-backed antshrike inhabits a variety of landscapes most of which are somewhat open. They include the edges of evergreen forest and mature secondary forest, and regrowing clearings and abandoned plantations (especially those with bamboo). In the lowlands of Amazonia it also occurs in várzea and in some areas pure stands of Guadua bamboo. In coastal southeastern Brazil it adds shrubby parks and gardens. In the Peruvian Andes it mostly is found at elevations between 400 and 1,700 m (1,300 and 5,600 ft) and in Bolivia as high as 2,200 m (7,200 ft). In southeastern Brazil it mostly occurs below 300 m (1,000 ft) but is found as high as 1,000 m (3,300 ft).

== Behavior ==
=== Movement ===
The chestnut-backed antshrike is presumed to be a year-round resident throughout its range.

=== Feeding ===
The chestnut-backed antshrike's diet is not known in detail but includes a variety insects and also other arthropods like spiders. It usually forages singly or in pairs and often joins mixed-species feeding flocks as they pass through its territory. It forages in dense vegetation from near the ground to about 15 m (50 ft) above it. It hops between branches to glean prey with quick stabs and lunges from leaves, stems, branches, and trunks. In eastern Brazil it has been observed following army ant swarms but only in dense vegetation.

=== Breeding ===
The chestnut-backed antshrike's breeding season has not been fully defined but spans October to January in southeastern Brazil. It appears to start in November in Amazonian Brazil and perhaps extends to June. The species' nest is a small deep cup loosely woven from fungus, root, and other plant fibers and sometimes covered with green moss. It is hung by its rim in a branch fork, often between 1.5 and 3 m (5 and 10 ft) above the ground in a dense thicket. The usual clutch size is two eggs. The incubation period, time to fledging, and details of parental care are not known.

=== Vocalization ===
The chestnut-backed antshrike's song is "a moderately long...accelerating series of similar, rapidly delivered, somewhat nasal notes, pitch rising slightly initially, more clearly falling towards end, terminating in longer, firmly accented, downslurred note". It has been written as kah kah-kah-kah-ka'ka'ka'kaka'pah". Its calls include an "emphatic short nasal note" and a "longer, upward-inflected, squeal". The first has been written as "awr!; another call is "a mewing whistled wheeu".

== Status ==
The IUCN has assessed the chestnut-backed antshrike as being of Least Concern. It has a very large range; its population size is not known but is believed to be stable. No immediate threats have been identified. It is considered fairly common in much of its range and occurs in several protected areas. It is "[a]dapted to a variety of habitats, including highly disturbed woodland and second growth, rendering it of low vulnerability".
