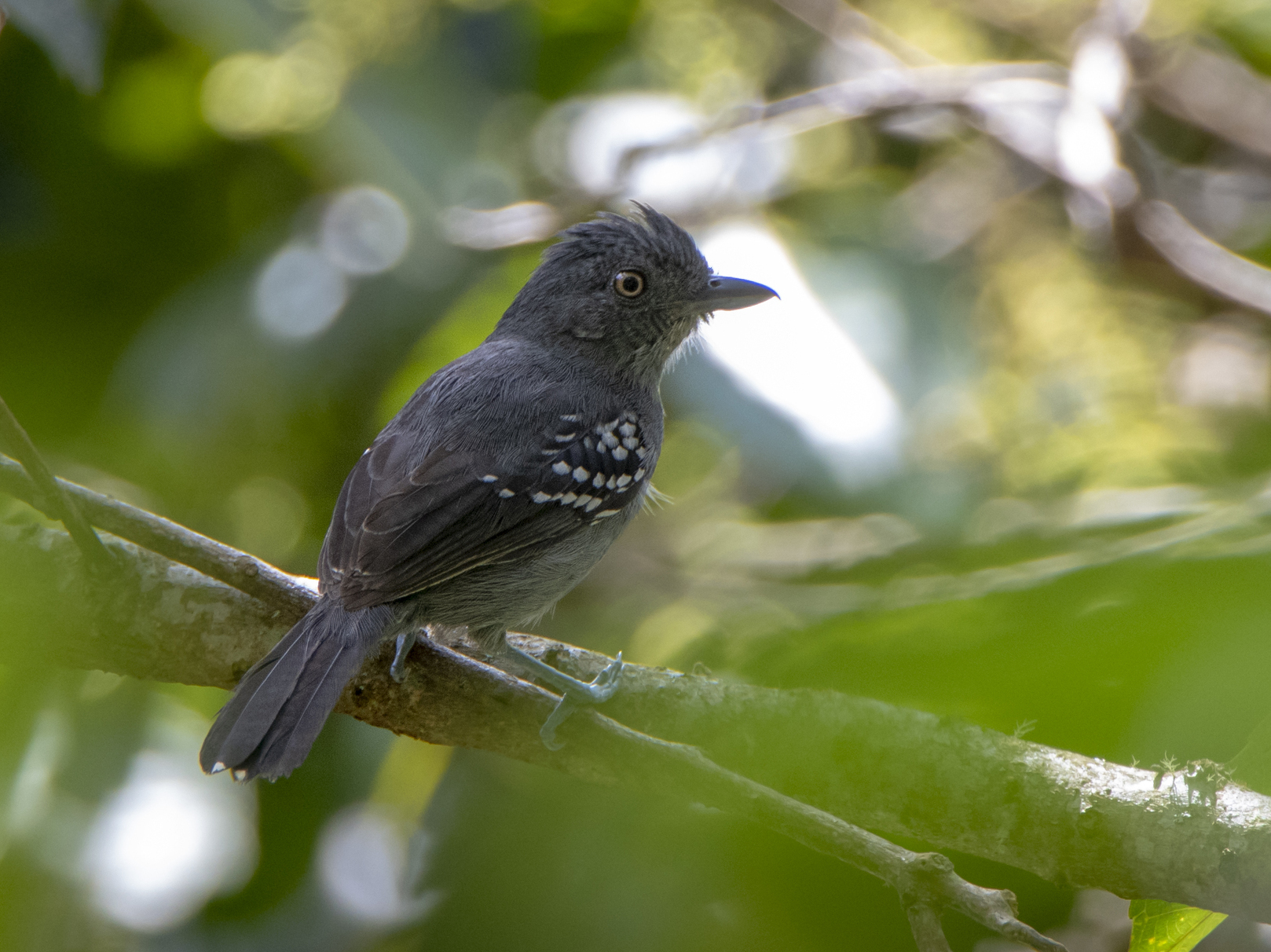

Conservation status
- Least Concern (IUCN 3.1)

Scientific classification
- Kingdom: Animalia
- Phylum: Chordata
- Class: Aves
- Order: Passeriformes
- Family: Thamnophilidae
- Genus: Thamnophilus
- Species: T. aroyae

Binomial name
- Thamnophilus aroyae (Hellmayr, 1904)

= Upland antshrike =

Species of bird

The upland antshrike (Thamnophilus aroyae) is a species of bird in subfamily Thamnophilinae of family Thamnophilidae, the "typical antbirds". It is found in the eastern Andes of Bolivia and southeastern Peru.

== Taxonomy and systematics ==
The upland antshrike is monotypic.

== Description ==
The upland antshrike is 14.5 to 15 cm (5.7 to 5.9 in) long and weighs about 20 g (0.71 oz). Members of genus Thamnophilus are largish members of the antbird family; all have stout bills with a hook like those of true shrikes. This species exhibits significant sexual dimorphism. Adult males have medium gray upperparts with a blacker crown and a hidden white patch between their scapulars. Their wings are black or brownish black and their wing coverts have white tips. Their tail is black or brownish black with white tips on all but the central pair of feathers. Their underparts are a slightly paler gray than their upperparts. Adult females have a dark rufous crown and nape and a gray face with white streaks or spots. Their upperparts are dark olive-brown. Their underparts are tawny olive or tawny brown. Both sexes have a highly variable (from buffy white to brown) iris color, a black maxilla, a paler mandible, and gray or blue-gray legs and feet. Juvenile males are similar to adult females but have buff spots on their wing coverts and buff tips on their tail feathers.

== Distribution and habitat ==
The upland antshrike is found in the Andean foothills from the Department of Puno in extreme southeastern Peru southeast to Cochabamba and western Santa Cruz departments in Bolivia. It inhabits the edges of humid montane forest, where it favors dense shrubby areas and vine tangles, and almost never penetrates far into the forest interior. It also occurs in newer regrowth in landslide scars and along roads. One publication states its elevational range as between 800 and 1,000 m (2,600 and 3,300 ft) in Peru and up to 1,700 m (5,600 ft) in Bolivia. Another states a wider range in Bolivia of 600 to 1,900 m (2,000 to 6,200 ft).

== Behavior ==
=== Movement ===
The upland antshrike is presumed to be a year-round resident throughout its range.

=== Feeding ===
The upland antshrike's diet is not known in detail but is mostly insects. It usually forages singly or in pairs and infrequently joins mixed-species feeding flocks. It usually forages between 1.5 and 3 m (5 and 10 ft) above the ground but will feed as high as 6 m (20 ft). It gleans prey from leaves, stems, vines, and branches while perched and with short upward sallies. It also searches in clusters of dead leaves caught in vine tangles.

=== Breeding ===
Nothing is known about the upland antshrike's breeding biology.

=== Vocalization ===
The upland antshrike's song is "a fast-paced, accelerating series of nasal notes, ending in a downslurred terminal note...wur wur-wur-wur-wur'rrrr". Its calls include "high whines; a drawn-out, modulated, throaty, descending caw aarrrr; and a mewing awww".

== Status ==
The IUCN originally in 1988 assessed the upland antshrike as Near Threatened, in 1994 as Unknown, and since 2004 as of Least Concern. Its population size is not known and is believed to be decreasing. No immediate threats have been identified. It is considered "poorly known" in Peru and "uncommon to locally fairly common" in Bolivia. "At least in the short term, Upland Antshrike may even benefit from disturbance, as it can colonize newly created young second growth and edge habitats; but presumably it remains vulnerable to larger-scale habitat modifications, such as whole conversion of forests to agriculture."
