= Melbourne Armstrong Carriker =

American ornithologist and entomologist

- Born: February 14, 1879
- Died: July 27, 1965 (aged 86)
- Known for: World's authority on bird lice; described numerous families, genera and species
- Scientific career
- Fields: Ornithology, entomology

Melbourne Armstrong Carriker Jr. (February 14, 1879 – July 27, 1965) was an American ornithologist and entomologist.

== Biography ==
=== Life ===
Carriker was born in Sullivan, Illinois, in 1879. He attended the University of Nebraska, where he studied Mallophaga (bird lice) under Lawrence Bruner. He had a son, Melbourne Romaine Carriker, who was a marine malacologist.

He Moved with his family in Beachwood, New Jersey, after returning to the United States in 1927.

He died in 1965.

=== Career ===
Carriker began collecting the skins of birds and studying avian habits when he graduated from high school. He held an interest in bird lice, and became a world authority on genera from the neotropics. He communicated with global Mallophaga systematists and published numerous papers in both Spanish and English. He also described two families, four subfamilies, 53 genera and subgenera, and approximately 866 species and subspecies of bird lice throughout his career. He traveled extensively throughout South America and collected specimens for the Carnegie Museum, the American Museum of Natural History in Manhattan, New York, the Academy of Natural Sciences of Drexel University (then the Academy of Natural Sciences of Philadelphia), the United States National Museum, the Peabody Museum, the Field Museum of Natural History in Chicago, Illinois, and the Natural History Museum of Los Angeles County.

Carriker worked as an assistant curator of birds at Carnegie Museum from 1907 to 1909. He became an honorary collaborator in the Department of Entomology, at the United States National Museum, in 1953. A posthumous collection of his articles and catalog of the lice he described was published in the Bulletin of the U.S. National Museum in 1967.
