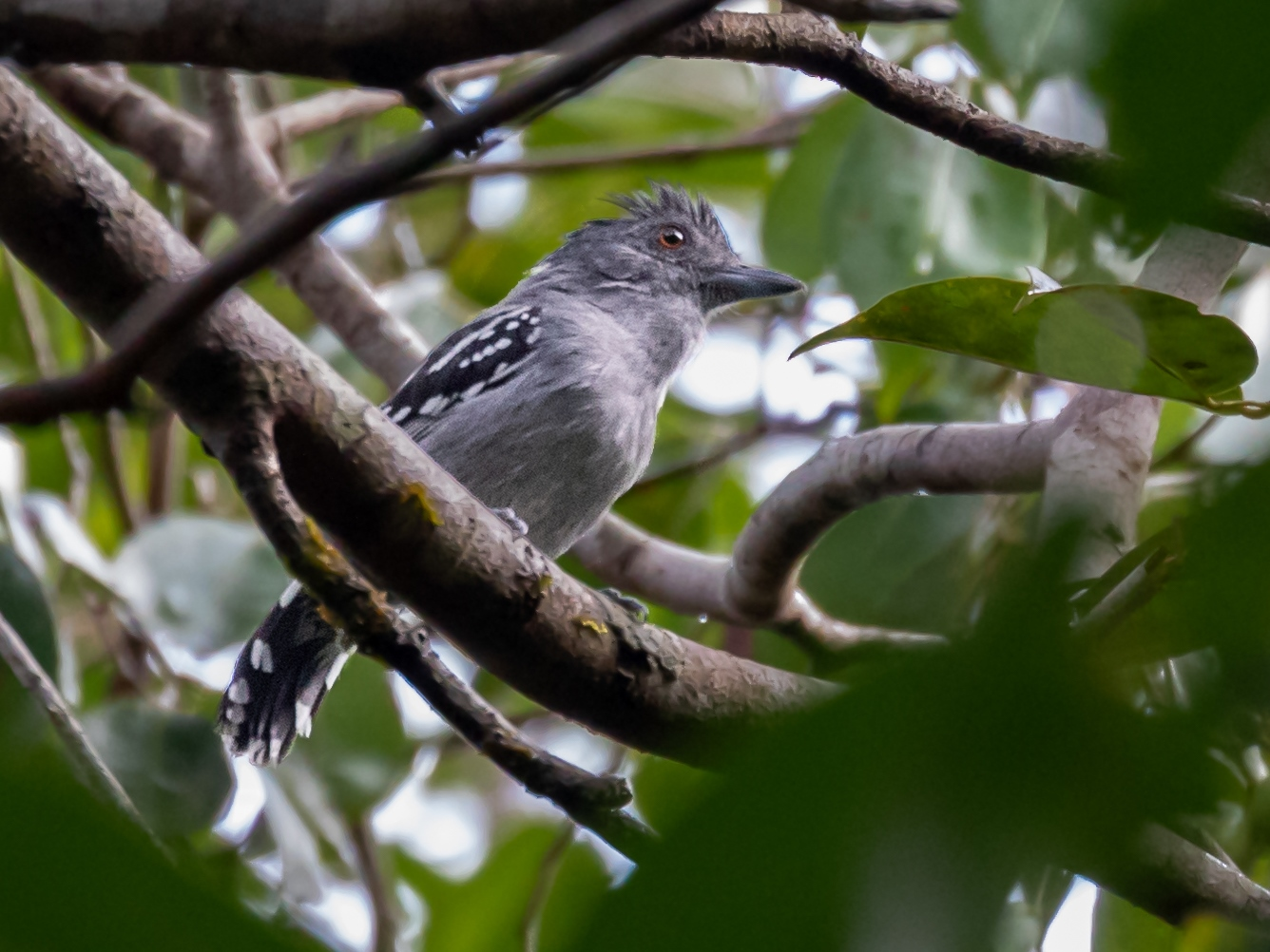

Conservation status
- Least Concern (IUCN 3.1)

Scientific classification
- Kingdom: Animalia
- Phylum: Chordata
- Class: Aves
- Order: Passeriformes
- Family: Thamnophilidae
- Genus: Thamnophilus
- Species: T. punctatus

Binomial name
- Thamnophilus punctatus (Shaw, 1809)

Synonyms
- Thamnophilus punctatus punctatus

= Northern slaty antshrike =

Species of bird

The northern slaty antshrike (Thamnophilus punctatus) is a species of bird in subfamily Thamnophilinae of family Thamnophilidae, the "typical antbirds". It is found in Brazil, Colombia, Ecuador, French Guiana, Guyana, Peru, Suriname, and Venezuela.

== Taxonomy and systematics ==
The northern slaty antshrike's binomial Thamnophilus punctatus previously applied to a species called the slaty antshrike which included 11 subspecies. Following the results of a study published in 1997, the slaty antshrike was split into six species. To avoid confusion the remnant T. punctatus was given its present name of northern slaty antshrike.

The northern slaty antshrike has these four subspecies:

- T. p. interpositus Hartert, EJO & Goodson, 1917
- T. p. punctatus (Shaw, 1809)
- T. p. leucogaster Hellmayr, 1924
- T. p. huallagae Carriker, 1934

The Clements taxonomy groups the first two as the "Northern Slaty-Antshrike (Guianan)" and the last two as the "Northern Slaty-Antshrike (Peruvian)". Some authors have treated leucogaster and huallagae as a species called the "Marañón slaty-antshrike" and the other two as the "Guianan" or "eastern" slaty(-)antshrike.

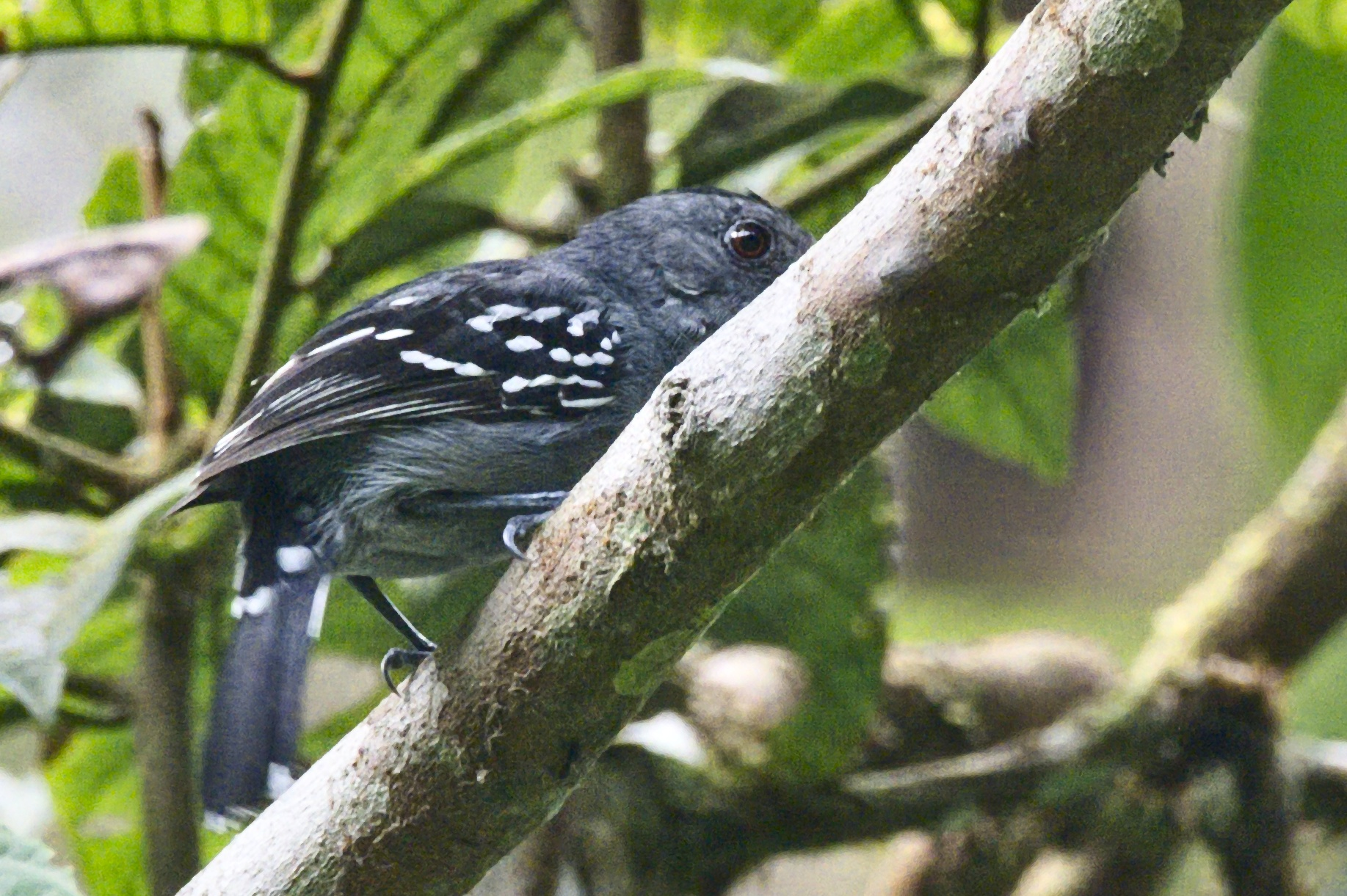
Northern slaty antshrike T. p. interpositus

== Description ==
The northern slaty antshrike is 13 to 15 cm (5.1 to 5.9 in) long and weighs 16 to 18 g (0.56 to 0.63 oz). Members of genus Thamnophilus are largish members of the antbird family; all have stout bills with a hook like those of true shrikes. This species exhibits significant sexual dimorphism. Adult males of the nominate subspecies T. p. punctatus have a gray forehead and a black crown. Their back is gray with a few black feather tips and a hidden white patch between their scapulars. Their face is gray. Their wings and wing coverts are black with white spots and edges. Their tail is black with white spots and tips on the outer feathers. Their underparts are slaty gray with sometimes a whitish belly. Adult females have a tawny crown and yellowish olive-brown upperparts. Their wings are dark brown with white spots on the coverts and pale buff edges on the flight feathers. Their tail is reddish yellow-brown with white spots and tips on the outer feathers. Their underparts are light buffy olive that is whiter on the throat and belly.

Males of subspecies T. p. interpositus have a black forehead, crown, and upperparts and dark gray underparts. Females are a darker clay color than the nominate. Males of subspecies T. p. leucogaster have a mostly black forehead, many white spots on their black crown, dark gray upperparts with minimal black spotting, and gray underparts with a white center to their belly. Females have a brown back and mostly white underparts with light buffy olive across their breast and on their sides and flanks. Males of T. p. huallagae have a black forehead, many white spots on their black crown, and darker gray upper- and underparts than the nominate. Females' underparts are more olive (less yellow) than the nominates'.

== Distribution and habitat ==
The northern slaty antshrike has a disjunct distribution: Each subspecies has a separate range. The nominate subspecies T. p. punctatus has by far the largest range. It is found from eastern and southern Venezuela east across the Guianas and Brazil east of the Negro River and north of the Amazon to the Atlantic in Pará and Amapá states. There are also sight records from extreme eastern Colombia that are attributed to punctatus. Subspecies T. p. interpositus is found on the east side of the Andes from western Venezuela south into Colombia as far as Caquetá Department. T. p. leucogaster is found in the watersheds of the Marañón River and its tributary Chinchipe River in far southern Ecuador's Zamora-Chinchipe Province and northern Peru's departments of Cajamarca and Amazonas. T. p. huallagae is found only in the Huallaga River watershed in northern Peru's Department of San Martín.

The northern slaty antshrike inhabits a variety of forested and wooded landscapes, where it favors the understorey to mid-storey. In Brazil and the Guianas it occurs in forest on white-sand soil, semi-open woodlands, and older secondary forest from sea level to 1,000 m (3,300 ft). In Colombia it favors the edges of several forest and woodland types below 600 m (2,000 ft). In Ecuador and Peru it occurs in dryish deciduous woodland, in Ecuador at about 650 m (2,100 ft) and Peru up to 1,200 m (3,900 ft). In Venezuela it occurs up to 1,500 m (4,900 ft) in semi-humid evergreen forest, drier deciduous forest, gallery forest, and secondary forest; in mature forest it favors the edges.

== Behavior ==
=== Movement ===
The northern slaty antshrike is presumed to be a year-round resident throughout its range.

=== Feeding ===
The northern slaty antshrike's diet has not been detailed but includes insects and other arthropods. It usually forages singly or in pairs and sometimes joins mixed-species feeding flocks that pass through its territory. It usually forages in the understorey and mid-storey, mostly between 1 and 6 m (3 and 20 ft) of the ground but as high as 12 m (39 ft). It usually forages by gleaning prey while perched or with short upward sallies. It has been observed flipping over leaves on the ground. It takes prey from leaves, branches, and vines. It sometimes follows army ant swarms in its territory.

=== Breeding ===
The northern slaty antshrike's breeding season has not been fully defined but appears to vary geographically. Active nests have been found in different parts of Brazil in August and between October and December and in August in French Guiana. The species' nest is a cup made from shredded plant fibers lined with fine grass and fungal rhizomorphs and sometimes with green moss on the outside. It is suspended by its rim from a branch fork low to the ground. The usual clutch is two eggs. The incubation period, time to fledging, and details of parental care are not known.

=== Vocalization ===
The northern slaty antshrike's song is "an accelerating series of usually 10–15 progressively shorter notes starting with laboured, slow-paced notes that are countable, ending with trill of abrupt uncountable notes often sounding higher in pitch". Its pace varies among the subspecies; that of T. p. leucogaster is the fastest. Another description is a "series of 9-10 nasal notes, starting very slowly, but accelerating and rising very sharply". The song has been written as "oank, oank, ank, ank, ank, ank-ank-ankank" and as "kah kah kah-kah-kah'ka'ka'ka'ka'kr". Its calls include a "short 'caw' ", a "longer 'caw' ", and an "abrupt raspy note".

== Status ==
The IUCN has assessed the northern slaty antshrike as being of Least Concern. Its population size and trend are not known. No immediate threats have been identified. The nominate subspecies has a large range, is considered fairly common to common, and occurs in many habitat types. Subspecies T. p. leucogaster and T. p. huallagae "should be considered at risk, as their respective geographical ranges are extremely limited, and the dry-forest habitats which they occupy are under intensive pressure from agricultural development". The latter has a very small range and suitable habitat is badly fragmented.
