= List of birds of Ecuador =

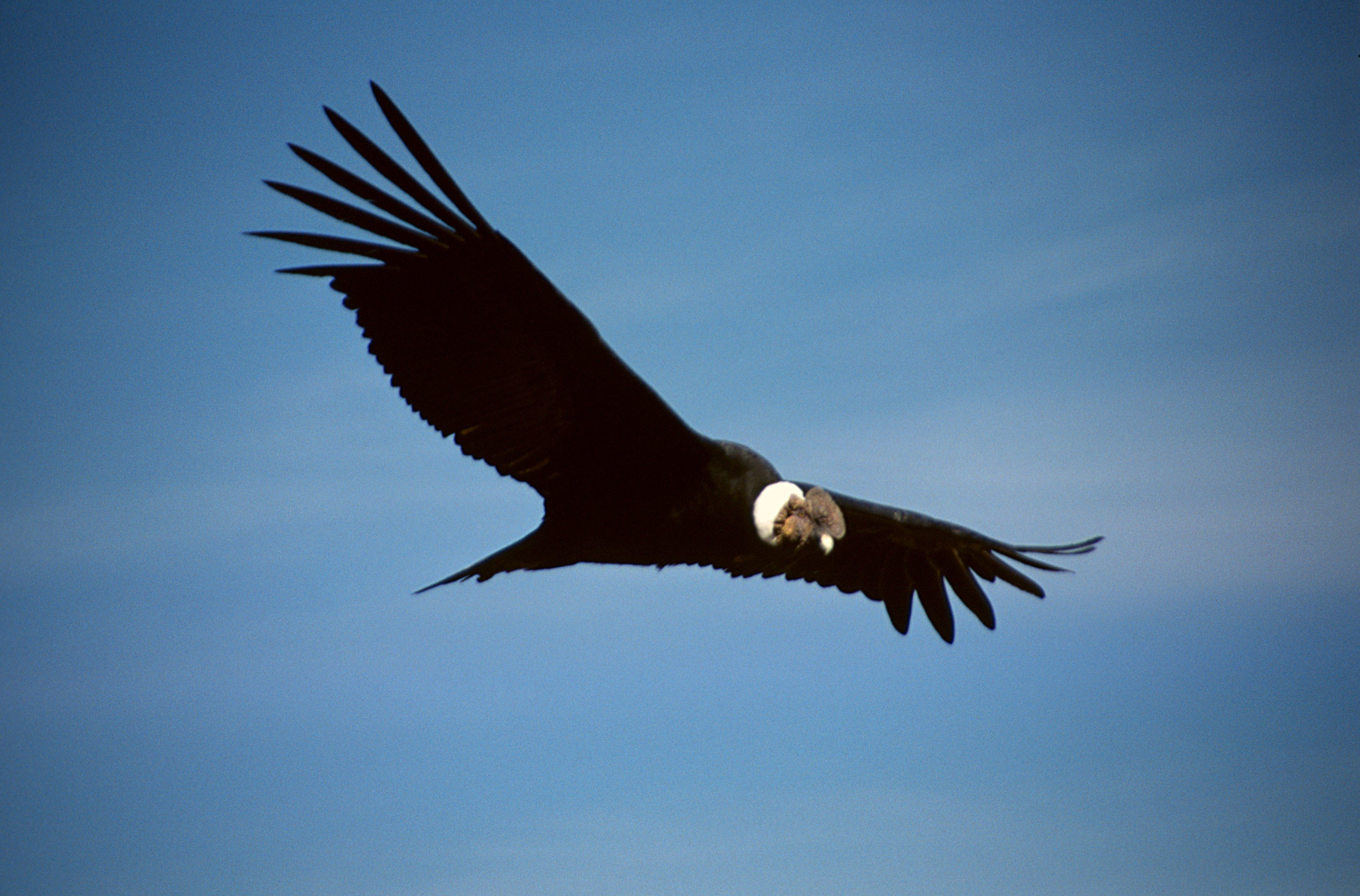
The Andean condor is the national bird of Ecuador.

This is a list of the bird species recorded in Ecuador including those of the Galápagos Islands. The avifauna of Ecuador has 1682 confirmed species, of which eight are endemic to the mainland and 29 are endemic to the Galápagos. Another four breed only on the Galápagos but range more widely, and almost the entire population of a fifth breeds only there. Five have been introduced by humans, 85 are rare or vagrants, and one has been extirpated. An additional 37 species are unconfirmed (see below).

Except as an entry is cited otherwise, the list of species is that of the South American Classification Committee (SACC). Those noted as Galápagos endemics are identified on the Charles Darwin Foundation list. The list's taxonomic treatment (designation and sequence of orders, families, and species) and nomenclature (common and scientific names) are also those of the SACC unless noted otherwise. Capitalization within English names follows Wikipedia practice, i.e. only the first word of a name is capitalized unless a place name such as São Paulo is used.

The following tags have been used to highlight certain categories of occurrence.

- (V) Vagrant - a species that rarely or accidentally occurs in Ecuador
- (EG) Endemic - Galápagos - a species endemic to the Galápagos Islands
- (EM) Endemic - mainland - a species endemic to mainland Ecuador
- (I) Introduced - a species introduced to Ecuador as a consequence, direct or indirect, of human actions
- (U) Unconfirmed - a species recorded but with "no tangible evidence" according to the SACC

== Tinamous ==
Order: Tinamiformes Family: Tinamidae

The tinamous are one of the most ancient groups of bird. Although they look similar to other ground-dwelling birds like quail and grouse, they have no close relatives and are classified as a single family, Tinamidae, within their own order, the Tinamiformes. Seventeen species have been recorded in Ecuador.

- Tawny-breasted tinamou, Nothocercus julius
- Highland tinamou, Nothocercus bonapartei
- Gray tinamou, Tinamus tao
- Black tinamou, Tinamus osgoodi
- Great tinamou, Tinamus major
- White-throated tinamou, Tinamus guttatus
- Berlepsch's tinamou, Crypturellus berlepschi
- Cinereous tinamou, Crypturellus cinereus
- Little tinamou, Crypturellus soui
- Brown tinamou, Crypturellus obsoletus
- Undulated tinamou, Crypturellus undulatus
- Pale-browed tinamou, Crypturellus transfasciatus
- Variegated tinamou, Crypturellus variegatus
- Bartlett's tinamou, Crypturellus bartletti
- Tataupa tinamou, Crypturellus tataupa
- Andean tinamou, Nothoprocta pentlandii
- Curve-billed tinamou, Nothoprocta curvirostris

== Screamers ==
Order: Anseriformes Family: Anhimidae

The screamers are a small family of birds related to the ducks. They are large, bulky birds, with a small downy head, long legs, and large feet which are only partially webbed. They have large spurs on their wings which are used in fights over mates and in territorial disputes. One species has been recorded in Ecuador.

- Horned screamer, Anhima cornuta

== Ducks ==
Order: Anseriformes Family: Anatidae

Anatidae includes the ducks and most duck-like waterfowl, such as geese and swans. These birds are adapted to an aquatic existence with webbed feet, flattened bills, and feathers that are excellent at shedding water due to an oily coating. Twenty-one species have been recorded in Ecuador.

- Fulvous whistling-duck, Dendrocygna bicolor
- Black-bellied whistling-duck, Dendrocygna autumnalis
- Orinoco goose, Neochen jubatus
- Muscovy duck, Cairina moschata
- Comb duck, Sarkidiornis sylvicola
- Brazilian teal, Amazonetta brasiliensis
- Torrent duck, Merganetta armata
- Northern shoveler, Spatula clypeata
- Blue-winged teal, Spatula discors
- Cinnamon teal, Spatula cyanoptera
- American wigeon, Mareca americana (V)
- White-cheeked pintail, Anas bahamensis
- Northern pintail, Anas acuta (V)
- Yellow-billed pintail, Anas georgica
- Green-winged teal, Anas crecca (V)
- Andean teal, Anas andium
- Southern pochard, Netta erythrophthalma
- Ring-necked duck, Aythya collaris (V)
- Lesser scaup, Aythya affinis
- Masked duck, Nomonyx dominicus
- Ruddy duck, Oxyura jamaicensis

== Guans ==
Order: Galliformes Family: Cracidae

The Cracidae are large birds, similar in general appearance to turkeys. The guans and curassows live in trees, but the smaller chachalacas are found in more open scrubby habitats. They are generally dull-plumaged, but the curassows and some guans have colorful facial ornaments. Fourteen species have been recorded in Ecuador.

- Sickle-winged guan, Chamaepetes goudotii
- Bearded guan, Penelope barbata
- Baudo guan, Penelope ortoni
- Andean guan, Penelope montagnii
- Spix's guan, Penelope jacquacu
- Crested guan, Penelope purpurascens
- Blue-throated piping-guan, Pipile cumanensis
- Wattled guan, Aburria aburri
- Rufous-headed chachalaca, Ortalis erythroptera
- Speckled chachalaca, Ortalis guttata
- Nocturnal curassow, Nothocrax urumutum
- Great curassow, Crax rubra
- Wattled curassow, Crax globulosa
- Salvin's curassow, Mitu salvini

== New World quails ==
Order: Galliformes Family: Odontophoridae

The New World quails are small, plump terrestrial birds only distantly related to the quails of the Old World, but named for their similar appearance and habits. Six species have been recorded in Ecuador.

- Tawny-faced quail, Rhynchortyx cinctus
- Marbled wood-quail, Odontophorus gujanensis
- Rufous-fronted wood-quail, Odontophorus erythrops
- Dark-backed wood-quail, Odontophorus melanonotus
- Rufous-breasted wood-quail, Odontophorus speciosus
- Starred wood-quail, Odontophorus stellatus

== Flamingos ==
Order: Phoenicopteriformes Family: Phoenicopteridae

Flamingos are gregarious wading birds, usually 3 to 5 feet (0.9 to 1.5 m) tall, found in both the Western and Eastern Hemispheres. Flamingos filter-feed on shellfish and algae. Their oddly shaped beaks are specially adapted to separate mud and silt from the food they consume and, uniquely, are used upside down. Two species have been recorded in Ecuador.

- Chilean flamingo, Phoenicopterus chilensis
- American flamingo, Phoenicopterus ruber

== Grebes ==
Order: Podicipediformes Family: Podicipedidae

Grebes are small to medium-large freshwater diving birds. They have lobed toes and are excellent swimmers and divers. However, they have their feet placed far back on the body, making them quite ungainly on land. Four species have been recorded in Ecuador.

- Least grebe, Tachybaptus dominicus
- Pied-billed grebe, Podilymbus podiceps
- Great grebe, Podiceps major
- Silvery grebe, Podiceps occipitalis

== Pigeons ==
Order: Columbiformes Family: Columbidae

Pigeons and doves are stout-bodied birds with short necks and short slender bills with a fleshy cere. Twenty-nine species have been recorded in Ecuador.

- Rock pigeon, Columba livia (I)
- Scaled pigeon, Patagioenas speciosa
- Band-tailed pigeon, Patagioenas fasciata
- Pale-vented pigeon, Patagioenas cayennensis
- Peruvian pigeon, Patagioenas oenops (U)
- Plumbeous pigeon, Patagioenas plumbea
- Ruddy pigeon, Patagioenas subvinacea
- Dusky pigeon, Patagioenas goodsoni
- Purple quail-dove, Geotrygon purpurata
- Sapphire quail-dove, Geotrygon saphirina
- Ruddy quail-dove, Geotrygon montana
- Olive-backed quail-dove, Leptotrygon veraguensis
- White-tipped dove, Leptotila verreauxi
- Ochre-bellied dove, Leptotila ochraceiventris
- Gray-fronted dove, Leptotila rufaxilla
- Pallid dove, Leptotila pallida
- White-throated quail-dove, Zentrygon frenata
- West Peruvian dove, Zenaida meloda
- Galapagos dove, Zenaida galapagoensis (EG)
- Eared dove, Zenaida auriculata
- Blue ground dove, Claravis pretiosa
- Maroon-chested ground dove, Paraclaravis mondetoura
- Black-winged ground dove, Metriopelia melanoptera
- Common ground dove, Columbina passerina
- Plain-breasted ground dove, Columbina minuta
- Ruddy ground dove, Columbina talpacoti
- Ecuadorian ground dove, Columbina buckleyi
- Scaled dove, Columbina squammata
- Croaking ground dove, Columbina cruziana

== Cuckoos ==
Order: Cuculiformes Family: Cuculidae

Cuculidae includes cuckoos, roadrunners, and anis. These are birds of variable size with slender bodies, long tails, and strong legs. Eighteen species have been recorded in Ecuador.

- Greater ani, Crotophaga major
- Smooth-billed ani, Crotophaga ani
- Groove-billed ani, Crotophaga sulcirostris
- Striped cuckoo, Tapera naevia
- Pheasant cuckoo, Dromococcyx phasianellus
- Pavonine cuckoo, Dromococcyx pavoninus
- Rufous-vented ground-cuckoo, Neomorphus geoffroyi
- Banded ground-cuckoo, Neomorphus radiolosus
- Red-billed ground-cuckoo, Neomorphus pucheranii (U)
- Little cuckoo, Coccycua minuta
- Dwarf cuckoo, Coccycua pumila
- Squirrel cuckoo, Piaya cayana
- Black-bellied cuckoo, Piaya melanogaster
- Dark-billed cuckoo, Coccyzus melacoryphus
- Yellow-billed cuckoo, Coccyzus americanus
- Pearly-breasted cuckoo, Coccyzus euleri
- Black-billed cuckoo, Coccyzus erythropthalmus
- Gray-capped cuckoo, Coccyzus lansbergi

== Oilbird ==
Order: Steatornithiformes Family: Steatornithidae

The oilbird is a slim, long-winged bird related to the nightjars. It is nocturnal and a specialist feeder on the fruit of the oil palm.

- Oilbird, Steatornis caripensis

== Potoos ==
Order: Nyctibiiformes Family: Nyctibiidae

The potoos (sometimes called poor-me-ones) are large near passerine birds related to the nightjars and frogmouths. They are nocturnal insectivores which lack the bristles around the mouth found in the true nightjars. Five species have been recorded in Ecuador.

- Rufous potoo, Phyllaemulor bracteatus
- Great potoo, Nyctibius grandis
- Long-tailed potoo, Nyctibius aethereus
- Common potoo, Nyctibius griseus
- Andean potoo, Nyctibius maculosus

== Nightjars ==
Order: Caprimulgiformes Family: Caprimulgidae

Nightjars are medium-sized nocturnal birds which usually nest on the ground. They have long wings, short legs, and very short bills. Most have small feet, of little use for walking, and long pointed wings. Their soft plumage is camouflaged to resemble bark or leaves. Nineteen species have been recorded in Ecuador.

- Nacunda nighthawk, Chordeiles nacunda (V)
- Sand-colored nighthawk, Chordeiles rupestris
- Lesser nighthawk, Chordeiles acutipennis
- Common nighthawk, Chordeiles minor
- Band-tailed nighthawk, Nyctiprogne leucopyga
- Short-tailed nighthawk, Lurocalis semitorquatus
- Rufous-bellied nighthawk, Lurocalis rufiventris
- Blackish nightjar, Nyctipolus nigrescens
- Common pauraque, Nyctidromus albicollis
- Scrub nightjar, Nyctidromus anthonyi
- Swallow-tailed nightjar, Uropsalis segmentata
- Lyre-tailed nightjar, Uropsalis lyra
- Spot-tailed nightjar, Hydropsalis maculicaudus
- White-tailed nightjar, Hydropsalis cayennensis
- Ladder-tailed nightjar, Hydropsalis climacocerca
- Band-winged nightjar, Systellura longirostris
- Choco poorwill, Nyctiphrynus rosenbergi
- Ocellated poorwill, Nyctiphrynus ocellatus
- Rufous nightjar, Antrostomus rufus

== Swifts ==
Order: Apodiformes Family: Apodidae

Swifts are small birds which spend the majority of their lives flying. These birds have very short legs and never settle voluntarily on the ground, perching instead only on vertical surfaces. Many swifts have long swept-back wings which resemble a crescent or boomerang. Fifteen species have been recorded in Ecuador.

- Spot-fronted swift, Cypseloides cherriei
- White-chinned swift, Cypseloides cryptus
- Black swift, Cypseloides niger (U)
- White-chested swift, Cypseloides lemosi
- Chestnut-collared swift, Streptoprocne rutila
- White-collared swift, Streptoprocne zonaris
- Gray-rumped swift, Chaetura cinereiventris
- Band-rumped swift, Chaetura spinicaudus
- Pale-rumped swift, Chaetura egregia
- Chimney swift, Chaetura pelagica
- Chapman's swift, Chaetura chapmani (V)
- Short-tailed swift, Chaetura brachyura
- White-tipped swift, Aeronautes montivagus
- Fork-tailed palm-swift, Tachornis squamata
- Lesser swallow-tailed swift, Panyptila cayennensis

== Hummingbirds ==
Order: Apodiformes Family: Trochilidae

Hummingbirds are small birds capable of hovering in mid-air due to the rapid flapping of their wings. They are the only birds that can fly backwards. One hundred thirty-six species have been recorded in Ecuador.

- Fiery topaz, Topaza pyra
- White-necked jacobin, Florisuga mellivora
- White-tipped sicklebill, Eutoxeres aquila
- Buff-tailed sicklebill, Eutoxeres condamini
- Bronzy hermit, Glaucis aeneus
- Rufous-breasted hermit, Glaucis hirsutus
- Band-tailed barbthroat, Threnetes ruckeri
- Pale-tailed barbthroat, Threnetes leucurus
- Black-throated hermit, Phaethornis atrimentalis
- Stripe-throated hermit, Phaethornis striigularis
- Gray-chinned hermit, Phaethornis griseogularis
- Reddish hermit, Phaethornis ruber
- White-bearded hermit, Phaethornis hispidus
- White-whiskered hermit, Phaethornis yaruqui
- Green hermit, Phaethornis guy
- Tawny-bellied hermit, Phaethornis syrmatophorus
- Straight-billed hermit, Phaethornis bourcieri
- Long-billed hermit, Phaethornis longirostris
- Great-billed hermit, Phaethornis malaris
- Green-fronted lancebill, Doryfera ludovicae
- Blue-fronted lancebill, Doryfera johannae
- White-throated daggerbill, Schistes albogularis
- Geoffroy's daggerbill, Schistes geoffroyi
- Brown violetear, Colibri delphinae
- Lesser violetear, Colibri cyanotus
- Sparkling violetear, Colibri coruscans
- Tooth-billed hummingbird, Androdon aequatorialis
- Purple-crowned fairy, Heliothryx barroti
- Black-eared fairy, Heliothryx auritus
- Green-tailed goldenthroat, Polytmus theresiae (U)
- Fiery-tailed awlbill, Avocettula recurvirostris
- Black-throated mango, Anthracothorax nigricollis
- Amethyst-throated sunangel, Heliangelus amethysticollis
- Gorgeted sunangel, Heliangelus strophianus
- Tourmaline sunangel, Heliangelus exortis
- Little sunangel, Heliangelus micraster
- Purple-throated sunangel, Heliangelus viola
- Royal sunangel, Heliangelus regalis
- Green thorntail, Discosura conversii
- Wire-crested thorntail, Discosura popelairii
- Black-bellied thorntail, Discosura langsdorffi
- Rufous-crested coquette, Lophornis delattrei (U)
- Spangled coquette, Lophornis stictolophus
- Butterfly coquette, Lophornis verreauxii
- Ecuadorian piedtail, Phlogophilus hemileucurus
- Speckled hummingbird, Adelomyia melanogenys
- Long-tailed sylph, Aglaiocercus kingii
- Violet-tailed sylph, Aglaiocercus coelestis
- Ecuadorian hillstar, Oreotrochilus chimborazo
- Blue-throated hillstar, Oreotrochilus cyanolaemus (EM)
- Green-headed hillstar, Oreotrochilus stolzmanni
- Mountain avocetbill, Opisthoprora euryptera
- Black-tailed trainbearer, Lesbia victoriae
- Green-tailed trainbearer, Lesbia nuna
- Purple-backed thornbill, Ramphomicron microrhynchum
- Rufous-capped thornbill, Chalcostigma ruficeps
- Blue-mantled thornbill, Chalcostigma stanleyi
- Rainbow-bearded thornbill, Chalcostigma herrani
- Tyrian metaltail, Metallura tyrianthina
- Viridian metaltail, Metallura williami
- Violet-throated metaltail, Metallura baroni (EM)
- Neblina metaltail, Metallura odomae
- Greenish puffleg, Haplophaedia aureliae
- Hoary puffleg, Haplophaedia lugens
- Black-breasted puffleg, Eriocnemis nigrivestis (EM)
- Glowing puffleg, Eriocnemis vestita
- Black-thighed puffleg, Eriocnemis derbyi
- Turquoise-throated puffleg, Eriocnemis godini
- Sapphire-vented puffleg, Eriocnemis luciani
- Golden-breasted puffleg, Eriocnemis mosquera
- Emerald-bellied puffleg, Eriocnemis aline
- Shining sunbeam, Aglaeactis cupripennis
- Bronzy Inca, Coeligena coeligena
- Brown Inca, Coeligena wilsoni
- Collared Inca, Coeligena torquata
- Rainbow starfrontlet, Coeligena iris
- Buff-winged starfrontlet, Coeligena lutetiae
- Mountain velvetbreast, Lafresnaya lafresnayi
- Sword-billed hummingbird, Ensifera ensifera
- Great sapphirewing, Pterophanes cyanopterus
- Buff-tailed coronet, Boissonneaua flavescens
- Chestnut-breasted coronet, Boissonneaua matthewsii
- Velvet-purple coronet, Boissonneaua jardini
- Booted racket-tail, Ocreatus underwoodii
- Rufous-gaped hillstar, Urochroa bougueri
- Green-backed hillstar, Urochroa leucura
- Purple-bibbed whitetip, Urosticte benjamini
- Rufous-vented whitetip, Urosticte ruficrissa
- Pink-throated brilliant, Heliodoxa gularis
- Black-throated brilliant, Heliodoxa schreibersii
- Gould's jewelfront, Heliodoxa aurescens
- Fawn-breasted brilliant, Heliodoxa rubinoides
- Green-crowned brilliant, Heliodoxa jacula
- Empress brilliant, Heliodoxa imperatrix
- Violet-fronted brilliant, Heliodoxa leadbeateri
- Northern giant-hummingbird, Patagona peruviana
- Long-billed starthroat, Heliomaster longirostris
- Blue-tufted starthroat, Heliomaster furcifer (U)
- Purple-collared woodstar, Myrtis fanny
- Peruvian sheartail, Thaumastura cora
- White-bellied woodstar, Chaetocercus mulsant
- Little woodstar, Chaetocercus bombus
- Gorgeted woodstar, Chaetocercus heliodor
- Esmeraldas woodstar, Chaetocercus berlepschi (EM)
- Short-tailed woodstar, Myrmia micrura
- Amethyst woodstar, Calliphlox amethystina
- Purple-throated woodstar, Philodice mitchellii
- Western emerald, Chlorostilbon melanorhynchus
- Blue-tailed emerald, Chlorostilbon mellisugus
- Violet-headed hummingbird, Klais guimeti
- Gray-breasted sabrewing, Campylopterus largipennis
- Lazuline sabrewing, Campylopterus falcatus
- Napo sabrewing, Campylopterus villaviscensio
- White-vented plumeleteer, Chalybura buffonii
- Bronze-tailed plumeleteer, Chalybura urochrysia
- Crowned woodnymph, Thalurania colombica
- Fork-tailed woodnymph, Thalurania furcata
- Tumbes hummingbird, Thaumasius baeri
- Spot-throated hummingbird, Thaumasius taczanowskii
- Many-spotted hummingbird, Taphrospilus hypostictus
- Olive-spotted hummingbird, Talaphorus chlorocercus
- Rufous-tailed hummingbird, Amazilia tzacatl
- Amazilia hummingbird, Amazilis amazilia
- Andean emerald, Uranomitra franciae
- Golden-tailed sapphire, Chrysuronia oenone
- Humboldt's sapphire, Chrysuronia humboldtii
- Blue-headed sapphire, Chrysuronia grayi
- Glittering-throated emerald, Chionomesa fimbriata
- Sapphire-spangled emerald, Chionomesa lactea (U)
- Rufous-throated sapphire, Hylocharis sapphirina
- Blue-chested hummingbird, Polyerata amabilis
- Purple-chested hummingbird, Polyerata rosenbergi
- White-chinned sapphire, Chlorestes cyanus
- Violet-bellied hummingbird, Chlorestes julie
- Blue-chinned sapphire, Chlorestes notata

== Hoatzin ==
Order: Opisthocomiformes Family: Opisthocomidae

The hoatzin is pheasant-sized, but much slimmer; it has a long tail, long neck, and small head. It has an unfeathered blue face with red eyes, and its head is topped by a spiky crest. It is a weak flier and is found in the swamps of the Amazon and Orinoco rivers.

- Hoatzin, Opisthocomus hoazin

== Limpkin ==
Order: Gruiformes Family: Aramidae

The limpkin resembles a large rail. It has drab-brown plumage and a grayer head and neck.

- Limpkin, Aramus guarauna

== Trumpeters ==
Order: Gruiformes Family: Psophiidae

The trumpeters are dumpy birds with long necks and legs and chicken-like bills. They are named for the trumpeting call of the males. One species has been recorded in Ecuador.

- Gray-winged trumpeter, Psophia crepitans

== Rails ==
Order: Gruiformes Family: Rallidae

Rallidae is a large family of small to medium-sized birds which includes the rails, crakes, coots, and gallinules. Typically they inhabit dense vegetation in damp environments near lakes, swamps, or rivers. In general they are shy and secretive birds, making them difficult to observe. Most species have strong legs and long toes which are well adapted to soft uneven surfaces. They tend to have short, rounded wings and to be weak fliers. Twenty-eight species have been recorded in Ecuador.

- Mangrove rail, Rallus longirostris
- Virginia rail, Rallus limicola
- Purple gallinule, Porphyrio martinica
- Azure gallinule, Porphyrio flavirostris
- Chestnut-headed crake, Anurolimnas castaneiceps
- Russet-crowned crake, Anurolimnas viridis
- Black-banded crake, Anurolimnas fasciatus
- Rufous-sided crake, Laterallus melanophaius
- White-throated crake, Laterallus albigularis
- Gray-breasted crake, Laterallus exilis
- Galapagos rail, Laterallus spilonota (EG)
- Ocellated crake, Micropygia schomburgkii
- Ash-throated crake, Mustelirallus albicollis
- Colombian crake, Mustelirallus colombianus
- Paint-billed crake, Mustelirallus erythrops
- Spotted rail, Pardirallus maculatus
- Blackish rail, Pardirallus nigricans
- Plumbeous rail, Pardirallus sanguinolentus
- Uniform crake, Amaurolimnas concolor
- Brown wood-rail, Aramides wolfi
- Gray-cowled wood-rail, Aramides cajaneus
- Rufous-necked wood-rail, Aramides axillaris
- Red-winged wood-rail, Aramides calopterus
- Yellow-breasted crake, Porzana flaviventer
- Sora, Porzana carolina
- Common gallinule, Gallinula galeata
- American coot, Fulica americana (V)
- Slate-colored coot, Fulica ardesiaca

== Finfoots ==
Order: Gruiformes Family: Heliornithidae

Heliornithidae is a small family of tropical birds with webbed lobes on their feet similar to those of grebes and coots. One species has been recorded in Ecuador.

- Sungrebe, Heliornis fulica

== Plovers ==
Order: Charadriiformes Family: Charadriidae

The family Charadriidae includes the plovers, dotterels, and lapwings. They are small to medium-sized birds with compact bodies, short, thick necks, and long, usually pointed, wings. They are found in open country worldwide, mostly in habitats near water. Thirteen species have been recorded in Ecuador.

- Black-bellied plover, Pluvialis squatarola
- American golden-plover, Pluvialis dominica
- Pacific golden-plover, Pluvialis fulva (V)
- Tawny-throated dotterel, Oreopholus ruficollis (V)
- Pied lapwing, Holoxypterus cayanus
- Killdeer, Charadrius vociferus
- Semipalmated plover, Charadrius semipalmatus
- Piping plover, Charadrius melodus (V)
- Southern lapwing, Vanellus chilensis
- Andean lapwing, Vanellus resplendens
- Wilson's plover, Anarynchus wilsonia
- Collared plover, Anarynchus collaris
- Snowy plover, Anarynchus nivosus

== Oystercatchers ==
Order: Charadriiformes Family: Haematopodidae

The oystercatchers are large and noisy plover-like birds, with strong bills used for smashing or prising open molluscs. Two species have been recorded in Ecuador.

- American oystercatcher, Haematopus palliatus
- Blackish oystercatcher, Haematopus ater

== Avocets and stilts ==
Order: Charadriiformes Family: Recurvirostridae

Recurvirostridae is a family of large wading birds which includes the avocets and stilts. The avocets have long legs and long up-curved bills. The stilts have extremely long legs and long, thin, straight bills. Two species have been recorded in Ecuador.

- Black-necked stilt, Himantopus mexicanus
- American avocet, Recurvirostra americana (V)

== Thick-knees ==
Order: Charadriiformes Family: Burhinidae

The thick-knees are a group of largely tropical waders in the family Burhinidae. They are found worldwide within the tropical zone, with some species also breeding in temperate Europe and Australia. They are medium to large waders with strong black or yellow-black bills, large yellow eyes, and cryptic plumage. Despite being classed as waders, most species have a preference for arid or semi-arid habitats. One species has been recorded in Ecuador.

- Peruvian thick-knee, Hesperoburhinus superciliaris

== Sandpipers ==
Order: Charadriiformes Family: Scolopacidae

Scolopacidae is a large diverse family of small to medium-sized shorebirds including the sandpipers, curlews, godwits, shanks, tattlers, woodcocks, snipes, dowitchers, and phalaropes. The majority of these species eat small invertebrates picked out of the mud or soil. Variation in length of legs and bills enables multiple species to feed in the same habitat, particularly on the coast, without direct competition for food. Thirty-eight species have been recorded in Ecuador.

- Upland sandpiper, Bartramia longicauda
- Whimbrel, Numenius phaeopus
- Long-billed curlew, Numenius americanus (V)
- Hudsonian godwit, Limosa haemastica
- Marbled godwit, Limosa fedoa (V)
- Ruddy turnstone, Arenaria interpres
- Red knot, Calidris canutus (V)
- Surfbird, Calidris virgata
- Ruff, Calidris pugnax (V)
- Sharp-tailed sandpiper, Calidris acuminata (U)
- Stilt sandpiper, Calidris himantopus
- Curlew sandpiper, Calidris ferruginea (V)
- Sanderling, Calidris alba
- Dunlin, Calidris alpina (V)
- Baird's sandpiper, Calidris bairdii
- Least sandpiper, Calidris minutilla
- White-rumped sandpiper, Calidris fuscicollis
- Buff-breasted sandpiper, Calidris subruficollis
- Pectoral sandpiper, Calidris melanotos
- Semipalmated sandpiper, Calidris pusilla
- Western sandpiper, Calidris mauri
- Short-billed dowitcher, Limnodromus griseus
- Long-billed dowitcher, Limnodromus scolopaceus (V)
- Imperial snipe, Gallinago imperialis
- Jameson's snipe, Gallinago jamesoni
- Noble snipe, Gallinago nobilis
- Wilson's snipe, Gallinago delicata
- Pantanal snipe, Gallinago paraguaiae (V)
- Puna snipe, Gallinago andina (U)
- Wilson's phalarope, Phalaropus tricolor
- Red-necked phalarope, Phalaropus lobatus
- Red phalarope, Phalaropus fulicarius
- Spotted sandpiper, Actitis macularius
- Solitary sandpiper, Tringa solitaria
- Wandering tattler, Tringa incana
- Greater yellowlegs, Tringa melanoleuca
- Willet, Tringa semipalmata
- Lesser yellowlegs, Tringa flavipes

== Seedsnipes ==
Order: Charadriiformes Family: Thinocoridae

The seedsnipes are a small family of birds that superficially resemble sparrows. They have short legs and long wings and are herbivorous waders. Two species have been recorded in Ecuador.

- Rufous-bellied seedsnipe, Attagis gayi
- Least seedsnipe, Thinocorus rumicivorus (V)

== Jacanas ==
Order: Charadriiformes Family: Jacanidae

The jacanas are a family of waders found throughout the tropics. They are identifiable by their huge feet and claws which enable them to walk on floating vegetation in the shallow lakes that are their preferred habitat. One species has been recorded in Ecuador.

- Wattled jacana, Jacana jacana

== Skuas ==
Order: Charadriiformes Family: Stercorariidae

The family Stercorariidae are, in general, medium to large birds, typically with gray or brown plumage, often with white markings on the wings. They nest on the ground in temperate and arctic regions and are long-distance migrants. Five species have been recorded in Ecuador.

- Chilean skua, Stercorarius chilensis (U)
- South polar skua, Stercorarius maccormicki (U)
- Pomarine jaeger, Stercorarius pomarinus (V)
- Parasitic jaeger, Stercorarius parasiticus (V)
- Long-tailed jaeger, Stercorarius longicaudus (V)

== Gulls ==
Order: Charadriiformes Family: Laridae

Laridae is a family of medium to large seabirds and includes gulls, kittiwakes, terns, and skimmers. Gulls are typically gray or white, often with black markings on the head or wings. They have longish bills and webbed feet. Terns are a group of generally medium to large seabirds typically with gray or white plumage, often with black markings on the head. Most terns hunt fish by diving but some pick insects off the surface of fresh water. Terns are generally long-lived birds, with several species known to live in excess 30 years. Thirty-five species of Laridae have been recorded in Ecuador.

- Brown noddy, Anous stolidus
- Black noddy, Anous minutus (V)
- Blue-billed white-tern, Gygis candida (U)
- Black skimmer, Rynchops niger
- Swallow-tailed gull, Creagrus furcatus (essentially EG; a few pairs breed in Colombia)
- Sabine's gull, Xema sabini
- Bonaparte's gull, Chroicocephalus philadelphia (V)
- Andean gull, Chroicocephalus serranus
- Gray-hooded gull, Chroicocephalus cirrocephalus
- Little gull, Hydrocoloeus minutus (V)
- Gray gull, Leucophaeus modestus
- Laughing gull, Leucophaeus atricilla
- Franklin's gull, Leucophaeus pipixcan
- Lava gull, Leucophaeus fuliginosus (EG)
- Belcher's gull, Larus belcheri
- Ring-billed gull, Larus delawarensis (V)
- California gull, Larus californicus (V)
- Kelp gull, Larus dominicanus
- Lesser black-backed gull, Larus fuscus (V)
- Herring gull, Larus argentatus (V)
- Sooty tern, Onychoprion fuscatus
- Bridled tern, Onychoprion anaethetus
- Least tern, Sternula antillarum (V)
- Yellow-billed tern, Sternula superciliaris
- Peruvian tern, Sternula lorata
- Large-billed tern, Phaetusa simplex
- Gull-billed tern, Gelochelidon nilotica
- Caspian tern, Hydroprogne caspia
- Inca tern, Larosterna inca
- Black tern, Chlidonias niger
- Common tern, Sterna hirundo
- Arctic tern, Sterna paradisaea
- South American tern, Sterna hirundinacea
- Elegant tern, Thalasseus elegans
- Sandwich tern, Thalasseus sandvicensis
- Royal tern, Thalasseus maximus

== Sunbittern ==
Order: Eurypygiformes Family: Eurypygidae

The sunbittern is a bittern-like bird of tropical regions of the Americas, and the sole member of the family Eurypygidae (sometimes spelled Eurypigidae) and genus Eurypyga.

- Sunbittern, Eurypyga helias

== Tropicbirds ==
Order: Phaethontiformes Family: Phaethontidae

Tropicbirds are slender white birds of tropical oceans, with exceptionally long central tail feathers. Their heads and long wings have black markings. Two species have been recorded in Ecuador.

- Red-billed tropicbird, Phaethon aethereus
- Red-tailed tropicbird, Phaethon rubricauda (U)

== Penguins ==
Order: Sphenisciformes Family: Spheniscidae

The penguins are a group of aquatic, flightless birds living almost exclusively in the Southern Hemisphere. Most penguins feed on krill, fish, squid, and other forms of sealife caught while swimming underwater. Two species have been recorded in Ecuador.

- Humboldt penguin, Spheniscus humboldti (V)
- Galapagos penguin, Spheniscus mendiculus (considered a breeding endemic)

== Albatrosses ==
Order: Procellariiformes Family: Diomedeidae

The albatrosses are among the largest flying birds, and the great albatrosses from the genus Diomedea have the largest wingspans of any extant birds. Four species have been recorded in Ecuador.

- Waved albatross, Phoebastria irrorata (considered a breeding endemic)
- Black-browed albatross, Thalassarche melanophris (V)
- Buller's albatross, Thalassarche bulleri (V)
- Salvin's albatross, Thalassarche salvini (V)

== Southern storm-petrels ==
Order: Procellariiformes Family: Oceanitidae

The storm-petrels are the smallest seabirds, relatives of the petrels, feeding on planktonic crustaceans and small fish picked from the surface, typically while hovering. The flight is fluttering and sometimes bat-like. Until 2018, this family's species were included with the other storm-petrels in family Hydrobatidae. Four species have been recorded in Ecuador.

- White-bellied storm-petrel, Fregetta grallaria (V)
- Wilson's storm-petrel, Oceanites oceanicus (V)
- Elliot's storm-petrel, Oceanites gracilis
- White-faced storm-petrel, Pelagodroma marina (V)

== Northern storm-petrels ==
Order: Procellariiformes Family: Hydrobatidae

Though the members of this family are similar in many respects to the southern storm-petrels, including their general appearance and habits, there are enough genetic differences to warrant their placement in a separate family. Seven species have been recorded in Ecuador.

- Least storm-petrel, Hydrobates microsoma
- Wedge-rumped storm-petrel, Hydrobates tethys
- Band-rumped storm-petrel, Hydrobates castro
- Leach's storm-petrel, Hydrobates leucorhous (V)
- Markham's storm-petrel, Hydrobates markhami (V)
- Hornby's storm-petrel, Hydrobates hornbyi (V)
- Black storm-petrel, Hydrobates melania (V)

== Shearwaters ==
Order: Procellariiformes Family: Procellariidae

The procellariids are the main group of medium-sized "true petrels", characterised by united nostrils with medium septum and a long outer functional primary. Nineteen species have been recorded in Ecuador.

- Southern giant-petrel, Macronectes giganteus (V)
- Northern giant-petrel, Macronectes halli (V)
- Southern fulmar, Fulmarus glacialoides (U)
- Pintado petrel, Daption capense (V)
- Kermadec petrel, Pterodroma neglecta (U)
- Mottled petrel, Pterodroma inexpectata (U)
- Galapagos petrel, Pterodroma phaeopygia (considered a breeding endemic)
- Juan Fernandez petrel, Pterodroma externa (V)
- Antarctic prion, Pachyptila desolata (V)
- White-chinned petrel, Procellaria aequinoctialis (V)
- Parkinson's petrel, Procellaria parkinsoni
- Wedge-tailed shearwater, Ardenna pacifica (V)
- Buller's shearwater, Ardenna bulleri (V)
- Sooty shearwater, Ardenna grisea
- Pink-footed shearwater, Ardenna creatopus (V)
- Flesh-footed shearwater, Ardenna carneipes (U)
- Christmas shearwater, Puffinus navtitatis (V)
- Manx shearwater, Puffinus puffinus (V)
- Galapagos shearwater, Puffinus subalaris (considered a breeding endemic)
- Peruvian diving-petrel, Pelecanoides garnotii (V)

== Storks ==
Order: Ciconiiformes Family: Ciconiidae

Storks are large, long-legged, long-necked wading birds with long, stout bills. Storks are mute, but bill-clattering is an important mode of communication at the nest. Their nests can be large and may be reused for many years. Many species are migratory. Two species have been recorded in Ecuador.

- Jabiru, Jabiru mycteria (V)
- Wood stork, Mycteria americana

== Frigatebirds ==
Order: Suliformes Family: Fregatidae

Frigatebirds are large seabirds usually found over tropical oceans. They are large, black-and-white, or completely black, with long wings and deeply forked tails. The males have colored inflatable throat pouches. They do not swim or walk and cannot take off from a flat surface. Having the largest wingspan-to-body-weight ratio of any bird, they are essentially aerial, able to stay aloft for more than a week. Two species have been recorded in Ecuador.

- Magnificent frigatebird, Fregata magnificens
- Great frigatebird, Fregata minor

== Boobies ==
Order: Suliformes Family: Sulidae

The sulids comprise the gannets and boobies. Both groups are medium to large coastal seabirds that plunge-dive for fish. Seven species have been recorded in Ecuador.

- Cape gannet, Morus capensis (U)
- Blue-footed booby, Sula nebouxii
- Peruvian booby, Sula variegata
- Masked booby, Sula dactylatra (V)
- Nazca booby, Sula granti
- Red-footed booby, Sula sula
- Brewster's booby, Sula brewsteri

== Anhingas ==
Order: Suliformes Family: Anhingidae

Anhingas are often called "snake-birds" because of their long thin neck, which gives a snake-like appearance when they swim with their bodies submerged. The males have black and dark-brown plumage, an erectile crest on the nape, and a larger bill than the female. The females have much paler plumage especially on the neck and underparts. The darters have completely webbed feet and their legs are short and set far back on the body. Their plumage is somewhat permeable, like that of cormorants, and they spread their wings to dry after diving. One species has been recorded in Ecuador.

- Anhinga, Anhinga anhinga

== Cormorants ==
Order: Suliformes Family: Phalacrocoracidae

Phalacrocoracidae is a family of medium to large coastal, fish-eating seabirds that includes cormorants and shags. Plumage coloration varies, with the majority having mainly dark plumage, some species being black-and-white, and a few being colorful. Four species have been recorded in Ecuador.

- Red-legged cormorant, Phalacrocorax gaimardi (V)
- Flightless cormorant, Phalacrocorax harrisi (EG)
- Neotropic cormorant, Phalacrocorax brasilianus
- Guanay cormorant, Phalacrocorax bougainvillii

== Pelicans ==
Order: Pelecaniformes Family: Pelecanidae

Pelicans are large water birds with a distinctive pouch under their beak. As with other members of the order Pelecaniformes, they have webbed feet with four toes. Two species have been recorded in Ecuador.

- Brown pelican, Pelecanus occidentalis
- Peruvian pelican, Pelecanus thagus

== Herons ==
Order: Pelecaniformes Family: Ardeidae

The family Ardeidae contains the bitterns, herons, and egrets. Herons and egrets are medium to large wading birds with long necks and legs. Bitterns tend to be shorter-necked and more wary. Members of Ardeidae fly with their necks retracted, unlike other long-necked birds such as storks, ibises, and spoonbills. Twenty-two species have been recorded in Ecuador.

- Rufescent tiger-heron, Tigrisoma lineatum
- Fasciated tiger-heron, Tigrisoma fasciatum
- Boat-billed heron, Cochlearius cochlearius
- Agami heron, Agamia agami
- Zigzag heron, Zebrilus undulatus
- Stripe-backed bittern, Ixobrychus involucris (U)
- Least bittern, Ixobrychus exilis
- Pinnated bittern, Botaurus pinnatus
- Capped heron, Pilherodius pileatus
- Whistling heron, Syrigma sibilatrix
- Little blue heron, Egretta caerulea
- Tricolored heron, Egretta tricolor
- Reddish egret, Egretta rufescens (V)
- Snowy egret, Egretta thula
- Yellow-crowned night-heron, Nyctanassa violacea
- Black-crowned night-heron, Nycticorax nycticorax
- Striated heron, Butorides striata
- Green heron, Butorides virescens
- Cattle egret, Ardea ibis
- Great egret, Ardea alba
- Great blue heron, Ardea herodias
- Cocoi heron, Ardea cocoi

== Ibises ==
Order: Pelecaniformes Family: Threskiornithidae

Threskiornithidae is a family of large terrestrial and wading birds which includes the ibises and spoonbills. They have long, broad wings with 11 primary and about 20 secondary feathers. They are strong fliers and despite their size and weight, very capable soarers. Eight species have been recorded in Ecuador.

- White ibis, Eudocimus albus
- Scarlet ibis, Eudocimus ruber
- Glossy ibis, Plegadis falcinellus
- Puna ibis, Plegadis ridgwayi (V)
- Green ibis, Mesembrinibis cayennensis
- Bare-faced ibis, Phimosus infuscatus
- Andean ibis, Theristicus branickii
- Roseate spoonbill, Platalea ajaja

== New World vultures ==
Order: Cathartiformes Family: Cathartidae

The New World vultures are not closely related to Old World vultures, but superficially resemble them because of convergent evolution. Like the Old World vultures, they are scavengers. However, unlike Old World vultures, which find carcasses by sight, New World vultures have a good sense of smell with which they locate carrion. Six species have been recorded in Ecuador.

- King vulture, Sarcoramphus papa
- Andean condor, Vultur gryphus
- Black vulture, Coragyps atratus
- Turkey vulture, Cathartes aura
- Lesser yellow-headed vulture, Cathartes burrovianus (V)
- Greater yellow-headed vulture, Cathartes melambrotus

== Osprey ==
Order: Accipitriformes Family: Pandionidae

The family Pandionidae contains only one species, the osprey. The osprey is a medium-large raptor which is a specialist fish-eater with a worldwide distribution.

- Osprey, Pandion haliaetus

== Hawks ==
Order: Accipitriformes Family: Accipitridae

Accipitridae is a family of birds of prey, which includes hawks, eagles, kites, harriers, and Old World vultures. These birds have powerful hooked beaks for tearing flesh from their prey, strong legs, powerful talons, and keen eyesight. Forty-eight species have been recorded in Ecuador.

- Pearl kite, Gampsonyx swainsonii
- White-tailed kite, Elanus leucurus
- Hook-billed kite, Chondrohierax uncinatus
- Gray-headed kite, Leptodon cayanensis
- Swallow-tailed kite, Elanoides forficatus
- Crested eagle, Morphnus guianensis
- Harpy eagle, Harpia harpyja
- Black hawk-eagle, Spizaetus tyrannus
- Black-and-white hawk-eagle, Spizaetus melanoleucus
- Ornate hawk-eagle, Spizaetus ornatus
- Black-and-chestnut eagle, Spizaetus isidori
- Black-collared hawk, Busarellus nigricollis
- Snail kite, Rostrhamus sociabilis
- Slender-billed kite, Helicolestes hamatus
- Double-toothed kite, Harpagus bidentatus
- Rufous-thighed kite, Harpagus diodon (U)
- Mississippi kite, Ictinia mississippiensis (U)
- Plumbeous kite, Ictinia plumbea
- Gray-bellied hawk, Accipiter poliogaster
- Sharp-shinned hawk, Accipiter striatus
- Bicolored hawk, Astur bicolor
- Cinereous harrier, Circus cinereus
- Tiny hawk, Microspizias superciliosus
- Semicollared hawk, Microspizias collaris
- Crane hawk, Geranospiza caerulescens
- Plumbeous hawk, Cryptoleucopteryx plumbea
- Slate-colored hawk, Buteogallus schistaceus
- Common black hawk, Buteogallus anthracinus
- Savanna hawk, Buteogallus meridionalis
- Great black hawk, Buteogallus urubitinga
- Solitary eagle, Buteogallus solitarius
- Barred hawk, Morphnarchus princeps
- Roadside hawk, Rupornis magnirostris
- Harris's hawk, Parabuteo unicinctus
- White-rumped hawk, Parabuteo leucorrhous
- Variable hawk, Geranoaetus polyosoma
- Black-chested buzzard-eagle, Geranoaetus melanoleucus
- White hawk, Pseudastur albicollis
- Gray-backed hawk, Pseudastur occidentalis
- Semiplumbeous hawk, Leucopternis semiplumbeus
- Black-faced hawk, Leucopternis melanops
- Gray-lined hawk, Buteo nitidus
- Broad-winged hawk, Buteo platypterus
- White-throated hawk, Buteo albigula
- Short-tailed hawk, Buteo brachyurus
- Swainson's hawk, Buteo swainsoni
- Galapagos hawk, Buteo galapagoensis (EG)
- Zone-tailed hawk, Buteo albonotatus

== Barn owls ==
Order: Strigiformes Family: Tytonidae

Barn owls are medium to large owls with large heads and characteristic heart-shaped faces. They have long strong legs with powerful talons. One species has been recorded in Ecuador.

- American barn owl, Tyto furcata

== Owls ==
Order: Strigiformes Family: Strigidae

The typical owls are small to large solitary nocturnal birds of prey. They have large forward-facing eyes and ears, a hawk-like beak, and a conspicuous circle of feathers around each eye called a facial disk. Twenty-nine species have been recorded in Ecuador.

- White-throated screech-owl, Megascops albogularis
- Tropical screech-owl, Megascops choliba
- Koepcke's screech-owl, Megascops koepckeae
- Rufescent screech-owl, Megascops ingens
- Cinnamon screech-owl, Megascops petersoni
- Choco screech-owl, Megascops centralis
- Foothill screech-owl, Megascops roraimae
- Peruvian screech-owl, Megascops roboratus
- Tawny-bellied screech-owl, Megascops watsonii
- Crested owl, Lophostrix cristata
- Spectacled owl, Pulsatrix perspicillata
- Band-bellied owl, Pulsatrix melanota
- Paramo horned owl, Bubo nigrescens
- Mottled owl, Strix virgata
- Black-and-white owl, Strix nigrolineata
- Black-banded owl, Strix huhula
- Rufous-banded owl, Strix albitarsis
- Cloud-forest pygmy-owl, Glaucidium nubicola
- Andean pygmy-owl, Glaucidium jardinii
- Subtropical pygmy-owl, Glaucidium parkeri
- Central American pygmy-owl, Glaucidium griseiceps
- Ferruginous pygmy-owl, Glaucidium brasilianum
- Peruvian pygmy-owl, Glaucidium peruanum
- Burrowing owl, Athene cunicularia
- Buff-fronted owl, Aegolius harrisii
- Striped owl, Asio clamator
- Stygian owl, Asio stygius
- Short-eared owl, Asio flammeus

== Trogons ==
Order: Trogoniformes Family: Trogonidae

The family Trogonidae includes trogons and quetzals. Found in tropical woodlands worldwide, they feed on insects and fruit, and their broad bills and weak legs reflect their diet and arboreal habits. Although their flight is fast, they are reluctant to fly any distance. Trogons have soft, often colorful, feathers with distinctive male and female plumage. Sixteen species have been recorded in Ecuador.

- Pavonine quetzal, Pharomachrus pavoninus
- Golden-headed quetzal, Pharomachrus auriceps
- Crested quetzal, Pharomachrus antisianus
- Slaty-tailed trogon, Trogon massena
- Blue-tailed trogon, Trogon comptus
- Ecuadorian trogon, Trogon mesurus
- Black-tailed trogon, Trogon melanurus
- White-tailed trogon, Trogon chionurus
- Green-backed trogon, Trogon viridis
- Gartered violaceous-trogon, Trogon caligatus
- Amazonian violaceous-trogon, Trogon ramonianus
- Blue-crowned trogon, Trogon curucui
- Kerr's black-throated trogon, Trogon cupreicauda
- Amazonian black-throated trogon, Trogon rufus
- Collared trogon, Trogon collaris
- Masked trogon, Trogon personatus

== Motmots ==
Order: Coraciiformes Family: Momotidae

The motmots have colorful plumage and long, graduated tails which they display by waggling back and forth. In most of the species, the barbs near the ends of the two longest (central) tail feathers are weak and fall off, leaving a length of bare shaft and creating a racket-shaped tail. Five species have been recorded in Ecuador.

- Broad-billed motmot, Electron platyrhynchum
- Rufous motmot, Baryphthengus martii
- Whooping motmot, Momotus subrufescens
- Amazonian motmot, Momotus momota
- Andean motmot, Momotus aequatorialis

== Kingfishers ==
Order: Coraciiformes Family: Alcedinidae

Kingfishers are medium-sized birds with large heads, long pointed bills, short legs, and stubby tails. Six species have been recorded in Ecuador.

- Ringed kingfisher, Megaceryle torquata
- Belted kingfisher, Megaceryle alcyon (V)
- Amazon kingfisher, Chloroceryle amazona
- American pygmy kingfisher, Chloroceryle aenea
- Green kingfisher, Chloroceryle americana
- Green-and-rufous kingfisher, Chloroceryle inda

== Jacamars ==
Order: Galbuliformes Family: Galbulidae

The jacamars are near passerine birds from tropical South America with a range that extends up to Mexico. They feed on insects caught on the wing, and are glossy, elegant birds with long bills and tails. In appearance and behavior they resemble the Old World bee-eaters, although they are more closely related to puffbirds. Ten species have been recorded in Ecuador.

- White-eared jacamar, Galbalcyrhynchus leucotis
- Brown jacamar, Brachygalba lugubris
- Yellow-billed jacamar, Galbula albirostris
- Rufous-tailed jacamar, Galbula ruficauda
- White-chinned jacamar, Galbula tombacea
- Bluish-fronted jacamar, Galbula cyanescens
- Coppery-chested jacamar, Galbula pastazae
- Purplish jacamar, Galbula chalcothorax
- Paradise jacamar, Galbula dea
- Great jacamar, Jacamerops aureus

== Puffbirds ==
Order: Galbuliformes Family: Bucconidae

The puffbirds are related to the jacamars and have the same range, but lack the iridescent colors of that family. They are mainly brown, rufous, or gray, with large heads and flattened bills with hooked tips. The loose abundant plumage and short tails makes them look stout and puffy, giving rise to the English common name of the family. Twenty-one species have been recorded in Ecuador.

- White-necked puffbird, Notharchus hyperrhynchus
- Black-breasted puffbird, Notharchus pectoralis
- Pied puffbird, Notharchus tectus
- Chestnut-capped puffbird, Bucco macrodactylus
- Spotted puffbird, Bucco tamatia
- Collared puffbird, Bucco capensis
- Barred puffbird, Nystalus radiatus
- Western striolated-puffbird, Nystalus obamai
- White-chested puffbird, Malacoptila fusca
- White-whiskered puffbird, Malacoptila panamensis
- Black-streaked puffbird, Malacoptila fulvogularis
- Moustached puffbird, Malacoptila mystacalis
- Lanceolated monklet, Micromonacha lanceolata
- Rusty-breasted nunlet, Nonnula rubecula
- Brown nunlet, Nonnula brunnea
- White-faced nunbird, Hapaloptila castanea
- Rufous-capped nunlet, Nonnula ruficapilla
- Black-fronted nunbird, Monasa nigrifrons
- White-fronted nunbird, Monasa morphoeus
- Yellow-billed nunbird, Monasa flavirostris
- Swallow-winged puffbird, Chelidoptera tenebrosa

== New World barbets ==
Order: Piciformes Family: Capitonidae

The barbets are plump birds, with short necks and large heads. They get their name from the bristles which fringe their heavy bills. Most species are brightly colored. Six species have been recorded in Ecuador.

- Scarlet-crowned barbet, Capito aurovirens
- Orange-fronted barbet, Capito squamatus
- Five-colored barbet, Capito quinticolor
- Gilded barbet, Capito auratus
- Lemon-throated barbet, Eubucco richardsoni
- Red-headed barbet, Eubucco bourcierii

== Toucan-barbets ==
Order: Piciformes Family: Semnornithidae

The toucan-barbets are birds of montane forests in the Neotropics. They are highly social and non-migratory.

- Toucan barbet, Semnornis ramphastinus

== Toucans ==
Order: Piciformes Family: Ramphastidae

Toucans are near passerine birds from the Neotropics. They are brightly marked and have enormous, colorful bills which in some species amount to half their body length. Seventeen species have been recorded in Ecuador.

- Yellow-throated toucan, Ramphastos ambiguus
- White-throated toucan, Ramphastos tucanus
- Choco toucan, Ramphastos brevis
- Channel-billed toucan, Ramphastos vitellinus
- Southern emerald-toucanet, Aulacorhynchus albivitta
- Chestnut-tipped toucanet, Aulacorhynchus derbianus
- Crimson-rumped toucanet, Aulacorhynchus haematopygus
- Gray-breasted mountain-toucan, Andigena hypoglauca
- Plate-billed mountain-toucan, Andigena laminirostris
- Black-billed mountain-toucan, Andigena nigrirostris
- Yellow-eared toucanet, Selenidera spectabilis
- Golden-collared toucanet, Selenidera reinwardtii
- Lettered aracari, Pteroglossus inscriptus
- Collared aracari, Pteroglossus torquatus
- Chestnut-eared aracari, Pteroglossus castanotis
- Many-banded aracari, Pteroglossus pluricinctus
- Ivory-billed aracari, Pteroglossus azara

== Woodpeckers ==
Order: Piciformes Family: Picidae

Woodpeckers are small to medium-sized birds with chisel-like beaks, short legs, stiff tails, and long tongues used for capturing insects. Some species have feet with two toes pointing forward and two backward, while several species have only three toes. Many woodpeckers have the habit of tapping noisily on tree trunks with their beaks. Thirty-four species have been recorded in Ecuador.

- Lafresnaye's piculet, Picumnus lafresnayi
- Ecuadorian piculet, Picumnus sclateri
- Rufous-breasted piculet, Picumnus rufiventris
- Olivaceous piculet, Picumnus olivaceus
- Yellow-tufted woodpecker, Melanerpes cruentatus
- Black-cheeked woodpecker, Melanerpes pucherani
- Smoky-brown woodpecker, Dryobates fumigatus
- Red-rumped woodpecker, Dryobates kirkii
- Little woodpecker, Dryobates passerinus
- Scarlet-backed woodpecker, Dryobates callonotus
- Yellow-vented woodpecker, Dryobates dignus
- Bar-bellied woodpecker, Dryobates nigriceps
- Red-stained woodpecker, Dryobates affinis
- Choco woodpecker, Dryobates chocoensis
- Powerful woodpecker, Campephilus pollens
- Crimson-bellied woodpecker, Campephilus haematogaster
- Red-necked woodpecker, Campephilus rubricollis
- Crimson-crested woodpecker, Campephilus melanoleucos
- Guayaquil woodpecker, Campephilus gayaquilensis
- Lineated woodpecker, Dryocopus lineatus
- Cinnamon woodpecker, Celeus loricatus
- Ringed woodpecker, Celeus torquatus
- Variable woodpecker, Celeus undatus
- Cream-colored woodpecker, Celeus flavus
- Rufous-headed woodpecker, Celeus spectabilis
- Chestnut woodpecker, Celeus elegans
- White-throated woodpecker, Piculus leucolaemus
- Lita woodpecker, Piculus litae
- Yellow-throated woodpecker, Piculus flavigula
- Golden-green woodpecker, Piculus chrysochloros
- Golden-olive woodpecker, Colaptes rubiginosus
- Crimson-mantled woodpecker, Colaptes rivolii
- Spot-breasted woodpecker, Colaptes punctigula
- Andean flicker, Colaptes rupicola

== Falcons ==
Order: Falconiformes Family: Falconidae

Falconidae is a family of diurnal birds of prey. They differ from hawks, eagles, and kites in that they kill with their beaks instead of their talons. Nineteen species have been recorded in Ecuador.

- Laughing falcon, Herpetotheres cachinnans
- Barred forest-falcon, Micrastur ruficollis
- Plumbeous forest-falcon, Micrastur plumbeus
- Lined forest-falcon, Micrastur gilvicollis
- Slaty-backed forest-falcon, Micrastur mirandollei
- Collared forest-falcon, Micrastur semitorquatus
- Buckley's forest-falcon, Micrastur buckleyi
- Crested caracara, Caracara plancus
- Red-throated caracara, Ibycter americanus
- Carunculated caracara, Phalcoboenus carunculatus
- Mountain caracara, Phalcoboenus megalopterus
- Black caracara, Daptrius ater
- Yellow-headed caracara, Milvago chimachima
- American kestrel, Falco sparverius
- Merlin, Falco columbarius
- Bat falcon, Falco rufigularis
- Orange-breasted falcon, Falco deiroleucus
- Aplomado falcon, Falco femoralis
- Peregrine falcon, Falco peregrinus

== New World and African parrots ==
Order: Psittaciformes Family: Psittacidae

Parrots are small to large birds with a characteristic curved beak. Their upper mandibles have slight mobility in the joint with the skull and they have a generally erect stance. All parrots are zygodactyl, having the four toes on each foot placed two at the front and two to the back. Forty-seven species have been recorded in Ecuador.

- Scarlet-shouldered parrotlet, Touit huetii
- Blue-fronted parrotlet, Touit dilectissimus
- Sapphire-rumped parrotlet, Touit purpuratus
- Spot-winged parrotlet, Touit stictopterus
- Barred parakeet, Bolborhynchus lineola
- Tui parakeet, Brotogeris sanctithomae (U)
- Canary-winged parakeet, Brotogeris versicolurus (I)
- Gray-cheeked parakeet, Brotogeris pyrrhoptera
- Cobalt-winged parakeet, Brotogeris cyanoptera
- Rusty-faced parrot, Hapalopsittaca amazonina (U)
- Red-faced parrot, Hapalopsittaca pyrrhops
- Rose-faced parrot, Pyrilia pulchra
- Orange-cheeked parrot, Pyrilia barrabandi
- Red-billed parrot, Pionus sordidus
- Speckle-faced parrot, Pionus tumultuosus
- Blue-headed parrot, Pionus menstruus
- Bronze-winged parrot, Pionus chalcopterus
- Short-tailed parrot, Graydidascalus brachyurus
- Festive amazon, Amazona festiva
- Red-lored amazon, Amazona autumnalis
- Yellow-crowned amazon, Amazona ochrocephala
- Mealy amazon, Amazona farinosa
- Orange-winged amazon, Amazona amazonica
- Scaly-naped amazon, Amazona mercenarius
- Dusky-billed parrotlet, Forpus modestus
- Riparian parrotlet, Forpus crassirostris
- Pacific parrotlet, Forpus coelestis
- Black-headed parrot, Pionites melanocephalus
- Red-fan parrot, Deroptyus accipitrinus
- Rose-fronted parakeet, Pyrrhura roseifrons
- Maroon-tailed parakeet, Pyrrhura melanura
- El Oro parakeet, Pyrrhura orcesi (EM)
- White-necked parakeet, Pyrrhura albipectus (EM)
- Dusky-headed parakeet, Aratinga weddellii
- Red-bellied macaw, Orthopsittaca manilatus
- Blue-and-yellow macaw, Ara ararauna
- Chestnut-fronted macaw, Ara severus
- Military macaw, Ara militaris
- Great green macaw, Ara ambiguus
- Scarlet macaw, Ara macao
- Red-and-green macaw, Ara chloropterus
- Golden-plumed parakeet, Leptosittaca branickii
- Yellow-eared parrot, Ognorhynchus icterotis
- Cordilleran parakeet, Psittacar frontatus
- Red-masked parakeet, Psittacara erythrogenys
- White-eyed parakeet, Psittacara leucophthalmus

== Sapayoa ==
Order: Passeriformes Family: Sapayoidae

The sapayoa is the only member of its family, and is found in the lowland rainforests of Panama and north-western South America. It is usually seen in pairs or mixed-species flocks.

- Sapayoa, Sapayoa aenigma

== Antbirds ==
Order: Passeriformes Family: Thamnophilidae

The antbirds are a large family of small passerine birds of subtropical and tropical Central and South America. They are forest birds which tend to feed on insects at or near the ground. A sizable minority of them specialize in following columns of army ants to eat small invertebrates that leave their hiding places to flee from the ants. Many species lack bright color, with brown, black, and white being the dominant tones. Ninety-four species have been recorded in Ecuador.

- Rufous-rumped antwren, Euchrepomis callinota
- Chestnut-shouldered antwren, Euchrepomis humeralis
- Ash-winged antwren, Euchrepomis spodioptila
- Fasciated antshrike, Cymbilaimus lineatus
- Fulvous antshrike, Frederickena fulva
- Great antshrike, Taraba major
- Barred antshrike, Thamnophilus doliatus
- Chapman's antshrike, Thamnophilus zarumae
- Lined antshrike, Thamnophilus tenuepunctatus
- Collared antshrike, Thamnophilus bernardi
- Black-crowned antshrike, Thamnophilus atrinucha
- Plain-winged antshrike, Thamnophilus schistaceus
- Mouse-colored antshrike, Thamnophilus murinus
- Cocha antshrike, Thamnophilus praecox
- Castelnau's antshrike, Thamnophilus cryptoleucus
- Northern slaty-antshrike, Thamnophilus punctatus
- Uniform antshrike, Thamnophilus unicolor
- White-shouldered antshrike, Thamnophilus aethiops
- Amazonian antshrike, Thamnophilus amazonicus
- Pearly antshrike, Megastictus margaritatus
- Black bushbird, Neoctantes niger
- Russet antshrike, Thamnistes anabatinus
- Plain antvireo, Dysithamnus mentalis
- Spot-crowned antvireo, Dysithamnus puncticeps
- Bicolored antvireo, Dysithamnus occidentalis
- White-streaked antvireo, Dysithamnus leucostictus
- Dusky-throated antshrike, Thamnomanes ardesiacus
- Cinereous antshrike, Thamnomanes caesius
- Plain-throated antwren, Isleria hauxwelli
- Spot-winged antshrike, Pygiptila stellaris
- Checker-throated stipplethroat, Epinecrophylla fulviventris
- Ornate stipplethroat, Epinecrophylla ornata
- Rufous-tailed stipplethroat, Epinecrophylla erythrura
- Rufous-backed stipplethroat, Epinecrophylla haematonota
- Foothill stipplethroat, Epinecrophylla spodionota
- Pygmy antwren, Myrmotherula brachyura
- Moustached antwren, Myrmotherula ignota
- Amazonian streaked-antwren, Myrmotherula multostriata
- Pacific antwren, Myrmotherula pacifica
- Stripe-chested antwren, Myrmotherula longicauda
- White-flanked antwren, Myrmotherula axillaris
- Slaty antwren, Myrmotherula schisticolor
- Rio Suno antwren, Myrmotherula sunensis
- Long-winged antwren, Myrmotherula longipennis
- Plain-winged antwren, Myrmotherula behni
- Gray antwren, Myrmotherula menetriesii
- Banded antbird, Dichrozona cincta
- Dugand's antwren, Herpsilochmus dugandi
- Ancient antwren, Herpsilochmus gentryi
- Yellow-breasted antwren, Herpsilochmus axillaris
- Rusty-winged antwren, Herpsilochmus rufimarginatus
- Dot-winged antwren, Microrhopias quixensis
- Striated antbird, Drymophila devillei
- Streak-headed antbird, Drymophila striaticeps
- Peruvian warbling-antbird, Hypocnemis peruviana
- Yellow-browed antbird, Hypocnemis hypoxantha
- Dusky antbird, Cercomacroides tyrannina
- Black antbird, Cercomacroides serva
- Blackish antbird, Cercomacroides nigrescens
- Riparian antbird, Cercomacroides fuscicauda
- Gray antbird, Cercomacra cinerascens
- Jet antbird, Cercomacra nigricans
- Western fire-eye, Pyriglena maura
- White-browed antbird, Myrmoborus leucophrys
- Ash-breasted antbird, Myrmoborus lugubris
- Black-faced antbird, Myrmoborus myotherinus
- Black-chinned antbird, Hypocnemoides melanopogon
- Black-and-white antbird, Myrmochanes hemileucus
- Silvered antbird, Sclateria naevia
- Slate-colored antbird, Myrmelastes schistaceus
- Plumbeous antbird, Myrmelastes hyperythrus
- Spot-winged antbird, Myrmelastes leucostigma
- Chestnut-backed antbird, Poliocrania exsul
- Gray-headed antbird, Ampelornis griseiceps
- Esmeraldas antbird, Sipia nigricauda
- Stub-tailed antbird, Sipia berlepschi
- Zimmer's antbird, Sciaphylax castanea
- White-shouldered antbird, Akletos melanoceps
- Sooty antbird, Hafferia fortis
- Zeledon's antbird, Hafferia zeledoni
- Black-throated antbird, Myrmophylax atrothorax
- Wing-banded antbird, Myrmornis torquata
- White-plumed antbird, Pithys albifrons
- Bicolored antbird, Gymnopithys bicolor
- White-cheeked antbird, Gymnopithys leucaspis
- Lunulated antbird, Oneillornis lunulatus
- Hairy-crested antbird, Rhegmatorhina melanosticta
- Spotted antbird, Hylophylax naevioides
- Spot-backed antbird, Hylophylax naevius
- Dot-backed antbird, Hylophylax punctulatus
- Common scale-backed antbird, Willisornis poecilinotus
- Black-spotted bare-eye, Phlegopsis nigromaculata
- Reddish-winged bare-eye, Phlegopsis erythroptera
- Ocellated antbird, Phaenostictus mcleannani

== Crescentchests ==
Order: Passeriformes Family: Melanopareiidae

These are smallish birds which inhabit regions of arid scrub. They have a band across the chest which gives them their name.

- Marañon crescentchest, Melanopareia maranonica
- Elegant crescentchest, Melanopareia elegans

== Gnateaters ==
Order: Passeriformes Family: Conopophagidae

The gnateaters are round, short-tailed, and long-legged birds which are closely related to the antbirds. Four species have been recorded in Ecuador.

- Rufous-crowned antpitta, Pittasoma rufopileatum
- Chestnut-belted gnateater, Conopophaga aurita
- Ash-throated gnateater, Conopophaga peruviana
- Chestnut-crowned gnateater, Conopophaga castaneiceps

== Antpittas ==
Order: Passeriformes Family: Grallariidae

Antpittas resemble the true pittas with strong, longish legs, very short tails, and stout bills. Twenty-three species have been recorded in Ecuador.

- Undulated antpitta, Grallaria squamigera
- Giant antpitta, Grallaria gigantea
- Moustached antpitta, Grallaria alleni
- Scaled antpitta, Grallaria guatimalensis
- Plain-backed antpitta, Grallaria haplonota
- Ochre-striped antpitta, Grallaria dignissima
- Chestnut-crowned antpitta, Grallaria ruficapilla
- Watkins's antpitta, Grallaria watkinsi
- Jocotoco antpitta, Grallaria ridgelyi
- Chestnut-naped antpitta, Grallaria nuchalis
- Yellow-breasted antpitta, Grallaria flavotincta
- White-bellied antpitta, Grallaria hypoleuca
- Bicolored antpitta, Grallaria rufocinerea
- Equatorial antpitta, Grallaria saturata
- Tawny antpitta, Grallaria quitensis
- Ochre-breasted antpitta, Grallaricula flavirostris
- Crescent-faced antpitta, Grallaricula lineifrons
- Leymebamba antpitta, Grallaricula leymebambae
- Peruvian antpitta, Grallaricula peruviana
- Slate-crowned antpitta, Grallaricula nana
- Streak-chested antpitta, Hylopezus perspicillatus
- White-lored antpitta, Myrmothera fulviventris
- Thrush-like antpitta, Myrmothera campanisona

== Tapaculos ==
Order: Passeriformes Family: Rhinocryptidae

The tapaculos are small suboscine passeriform birds with numerous species in South and Central America. They are terrestrial species that fly only poorly on their short wings. They have strong legs, well-suited to their habitat of grassland or forest undergrowth. The tail is cocked and pointed towards the head. Thirteen species have been recorded in Ecuador.

- Rusty-belted tapaculo, Liosceles thoracicus
- Ocellated tapaculo, Acropternis orthonyx
- Ash-colored tapaculo, Myornis senilis
- Blackish tapaculo, Scytalopus latrans
- Long-tailed tapaculo, Scytalopus micropterus
- White-crowned tapaculo, Scytalopus atratus
- Choco tapaculo, Scytalopus chocoensis
- Ecuadorian tapaculo, Scytalopus robbinsi (EM)
- Nariño tapaculo, Scytalopus vicinior
- Spillmann's tapaculo, Scytalopus spillmanni
- Chusquea tapaculo, Scytalopus parkeri
- Paramo tapaculo, Scytalopus opacus
- Loja tapaculo, Scytalopus androstictus

== Antthrushes ==
Order: Passeriformes Family: Formicariidae

Antthrushes resemble small rails with strong, longish legs, very short tails, and stout bills. Seven species have been recorded in Ecuador.

- Rufous-capped antthrush, Formicarius colma
- Black-faced antthrush, Formicarius analis
- Black-hooded antthrush, Formicarius destructus
- Rufous-breasted antthrush, Formicarius rufipectus
- Short-tailed antthrush, Chamaeza campanisona
- Striated antthrush, Chamaeza nobilis
- Barred antthrush, Chamaeza mollissima

== Ovenbirds ==
Order: Passeriformes Family: Furnariidae

Ovenbirds comprise a large family of small sub-oscine passerine bird species found in Central and South America. They are a diverse group of insectivores which gets its name from the elaborate "oven-like" clay nests built by some species, although others build stick nests or nest in tunnels or clefts in rock. The woodcreepers are brownish birds which maintain an upright vertical posture, supported by their stiff tail vanes. They feed mainly on insects taken from tree trunks. One hundred seven species have been recorded in Ecuador.

- South American leaftosser, Sclerurus obscurior
- Short-billed leaftosser, Sclerurus rufigularis
- Scaly-throated leaftosser, Sclerurus guatemalensis
- Black-tailed leaftosser, Sclerurus caudacutus
- Gray-throated leaftosser, Sclerurus albigularis
- Slender-billed miner, Geositta tenuirostris
- Spot-throated woodcreeper, Certhiasomus stictolaemus
- Olivaceous woodcreeper, Sittasomus griseicapillus
- Mournful long-tailed woodcreeper, Deconychura pallida
- Tyrannine woodcreeper, Dendrocincla tyrannina
- White-chinned woodcreeper, Dendrocincla merula
- Plain-brown woodcreeper, Dendrocincla fuliginosa
- Wedge-billed woodcreeper, Glyphorynchus spirurus
- Cinnamon-throated woodcreeper, Dendrexetastes rufigula
- Long-billed woodcreeper, Nasica longirostris
- Northern barred-woodcreeper, Dendrocolaptes sanctithomae
- Amazonian barred-woodcreeper, Dendrocolaptes certhia
- Black-banded woodcreeper, Dendrocolaptes picumnus
- Bar-bellied woodcreeper, Hylexetastes stresemanni
- Strong-billed woodcreeper, Xiphocolaptes promeropirhynchus
- Striped woodcreeper, Xiphorhynchus obsoletus
- Ocellated woodcreeper, Xiphorhynchus ocellatus
- Elegant woodcreeper, Xiphorhynchus elegans
- Buff-throated woodcreeper, Xiphorhynchus guttatus
- Black-striped woodcreeper, Xiphorhynchus lachrymosus
- Spotted woodcreeper, Xiphorhynchus erythropygius
- Olive-backed woodcreeper, Xiphorhynchus triangularis
- Straight-billed woodcreeper, Dendroplex picus
- Red-billed scythebill, Campylorhamphus trochilirostris
- Curve-billed scythebill, Campylorhamphus procurvoides
- Brown-billed scythebill, Campylorhamphus pusillus
- Greater scythebill, Drymotoxeres pucheranii
- Streak-headed woodcreeper, Lepidocolaptes souleyetii
- Montane woodcreeper, Lepidocolaptes lacrymiger
- Duida woodcreeper, Lepidocolaptes duidae
- Slender-billed xenops, Xenops tenuirostris
- Northern plain-xenops, Xenops mexicanus
- Amazonian plain-xenops, Xenops genibarbis
- Streaked xenops, Xenops rutilans
- Point-tailed palmcreeper, Berlepschia rikeri
- Rufous-tailed xenops, Microxenops milleri
- Pacific tuftedcheek, Pseudocolaptes johnsoni
- Streaked tuftedcheek, Pseudocolaptes boissonneautii
- Rusty-winged barbtail, Premnornis guttuliger
- Pale-legged hornero, Furnarius leucopus
- Pale-billed hornero, Furnarius torridus (U)
- Lesser hornero, Furnarius minor
- Sharp-tailed streamcreeper, Lochmias nematura
- Chestnut-winged cinclodes, Cinclodes albidiventris
- Stout-billed cinclodes, Cinclodes excelsior
- Dusky-cheeked foliage-gleaner, Anabazenops dorsalis
- Slaty-winged foliage-gleaner, Neophilydor fuscipenne
- Rufous-rumped foliage-gleaner, Neophilydor erythrocercum
- Cinnamon-rumped foliage-gleaner, Philydor pyrrhodes
- Montane foliage-gleaner, Anabacerthia striaticollis
- Scaly-throated foliage-gleaner, Anabacerthia variegaticeps
- Rufous-tailed foliage-gleaner, Anabacerthia ruficaudata
- Buff-browed foliage-gleaner, Syndactyla rufosuperciliata
- Lineated foliage-gleaner, Syndactyla subalaris
- Rufous-necked foliage-gleaner, Syndactyla ruficollis
- Chestnut-winged hookbill, Ancistrops strigilatus
- Buff-fronted foliage-gleaner, Dendroma rufa
- Chestnut-winged foliage-gleaner, Dendroma erythroptera
- Henna-hooded foliage-gleaner, Clibanornis erythrocephalus
- Ruddy foliage-gleaner, Clibanornis rubiginosus
- Uniform treehunter, Thripadectes ignobilis
- Flammulated treehunter, Thripadectes flammulatus
- Striped treehunter, Thripadectes holostictus
- Streak-capped treehunter, Thripadectes virgaticeps
- Black-billed treehunter, Thripadectes melanorhynchus
- Chestnut-crowned foliage-gleaner, Automolus rufipileatus
- Brown-rumped foliage-gleaner, Automolus melanopezus
- Buff-throated foliage-gleaner, Automolus ochrolaemus
- Striped woodhaunter, Automolus subulatus
- Olive-backed foliage-gleaner, Automolus infuscatus
- Spotted barbtail, Premnoplex brunnescens
- Fulvous-dotted treerunner, Margarornis stellatus
- Pearled treerunner, Margarornis squamiger
- Andean tit-spinetail, Leptasthenura andicola
- Rufous-fronted thornbird, Phacellodomus rufifrons
- White-browed spinetail, Hellmayrea gularis
- Many-striped canastero, Asthenes flammulata
- Streak-backed canastero, Asthenes wyatti
- White-chinned thistletail, Asthenes fuliginosa
- Mouse-colored thistletail, Asthenes griseomurina
- Orange-fronted plushcrown, Metopothrix aurantiaca
- Double-banded graytail, Xenerpestes minlosi
- Equatorial graytail, Xenerpestes singularis
- Spectacled prickletail, Siptornis striaticollis
- Plain softtail, Thripophaga fusciceps
- Parker's spinetail, Cranioleuca vulpecula
- Red-faced spinetail, Cranioleuca erythrops
- Ash-browed spinetail, Cranioleuca curtata
- Line-cheeked spinetail, Cranioleuca antisiensis
- Speckled spinetail, Cranioleuca gutturata
- White-bellied spinetail, Mazaria propinqua
- Plain-crowned spinetail, Synallaxis gujanensis
- Marañon spinetail, Synallaxis maranonica
- Necklaced spinetail, Synallaxis stictothorax
- Slaty spinetail, Synallaxis brachyura
- Dusky spinetail, Synallaxis moesta
- Dark-breasted spinetail, Synallaxis albigularis
- Azara's spinetail, Synallaxis azarae
- Blackish-headed spinetail, Synallaxis tithys
- Rufous spinetail, Synallaxis unirufa
- Ruddy spinetail, Synallaxis rutilans
- Chestnut-throated spinetail, Synallaxis cherriei

== Manakins ==
Order: Passeriformes Family: Pipridae

The manakins are a family of subtropical and tropical mainland Central and South America and Trinidad and Tobago. They are compact forest birds, the males typically being brightly colored, although the females of most species are duller and usually green-plumaged. Manakins feed on small fruits, berries, and insects. Sixteen species have been recorded in Ecuador.

- Dwarf tyrant-manakin, Tyranneutes stolzmanni
- Jet manakin, Chloropipo unicolor
- Blue-backed manakin, Chiroxiphia pareola
- Golden-winged manakin, Masius chrysopterus
- Green manakin, Cryptopipo holochlora
- Velvety manakin, Lepidothrix velutina
- Blue-capped manakin, Lepidothrix coronata
- Blue-rumped manakin, Lepidothrix isidorei
- Orange-crowned manakin, Heterocercus aurantiivertex
- White-bearded manakin, Manacus manacus
- Wire-tailed manakin, Pipra filicauda
- Club-winged manakin, Machaeropterus deliciosus
- Striolated manakin, Machaeropterus striolatus
- White-crowned manakin, Pseudopipra pipra
- Red-capped manakin, Ceratopipra mentalis
- Golden-headed manakin, Ceratopipra erythrocephala

== Cotingas ==
Order: Passeriformes Family: Cotingidae

The cotingas are birds of forests or forest edges in tropical South America. Comparatively little is known about this diverse group, although all have broad bills with hooked tips, rounded wings, and strong legs. The males of many of the species are brightly colored or decorated with plumes or wattles. Twenty-eight species have been recorded in Ecuador.

- Green-and-black fruiteater, Pipreola riefferii
- Barred fruiteater, Pipreola arcuata
- Orange-breasted fruiteater, Pipreola jucunda
- Black-chested fruiteater, Pipreola lubomirskii
- Scarlet-breasted fruiteater, Pipreola frontalis
- Fiery-throated fruiteater, Pipreola chlorolepidota
- Scaled fruiteater, Ampelioides tschudii
- Chestnut-bellied cotinga, Doliornis remseni
- Red-crested cotinga, Ampelion rubrocristatus
- Chestnut-crested cotinga, Ampelion rufaxilla
- Black-necked red-cotinga, Phoenicircus nigricollis
- Andean cock-of-the-rock, Rupicola peruvianus
- Gray-tailed piha, Snowornis subalaris
- Olivaceous piha, Snowornis cryptolophus
- Purple-throated fruitcrow, Querula purpurata
- Red-ruffed fruitcrow, Pyroderus scutatus
- Amazonian umbrellabird, Cephalopterus ornatus
- Long-wattled umbrellabird, Cephalopterus penduliger
- Blue cotinga, Cotinga nattererii
- Plum-throated cotinga, Cotinga maynana
- Spangled cotinga, Cotinga cayana
- Rufous piha, Lipaugus unirufus
- Screaming piha, Lipaugus vociferans
- Dusky piha, Lipaugus fuscocinereus
- Purple-throated cotinga, Porphyrolaema porphyrolaema
- Black-tipped cotinga, Carpodectes hopkei
- Pompadour cotinga, Xipholena punicea
- Bare-necked fruitcrow, Gymnoderus foetidus

== Tityras ==
Order: Passeriformes Family: Tityridae

Tityridae are suboscine passerine birds found in forest and woodland in the Neotropics. The species in this family were formerly spread over the families Tyrannidae, Pipridae, and Cotingidae. They are small to medium-sized birds. They do not have the sophisticated vocal capabilities of the songbirds. Most, but not all, have plain coloring. Twenty-three species have been recorded in Ecuador.

- Black-crowned tityra, Tityra inquisitor
- Black-tailed tityra, Tityra cayana
- Masked tityra, Tityra semifasciata
- Varzea schiffornis, Schiffornis major
- Northern schiffornis, Schiffornis veraepacis
- Foothill schiffornis, Schiffornis aenea
- Brown-winged schiffornis, Schiffornis turdina
- Speckled mourner, Laniocera rufescens
- Cinereous mourner, Laniocera hypopyrra
- White-browed purpletuft, Iodopleura isabellae
- Shrike-like cotinga, Laniisoma elegans
- Green-backed becard, Pachyramphus viridis
- Barred becard, Pachyramphus versicolor
- Slaty becard, Pachyramphus spodiurus
- Cinnamon becard, Pachyramphus cinnamomeus
- Chestnut-crowned becard, Pachyramphus castaneus
- Cryptic becard, Pachyramphus salvini
- White-winged becard, Pachyramphus polychopterus
- Black-and-white becard, Pachyramphus albogriseus
- Black-capped becard, Pachyramphus marginatus
- One-colored becard, Pachyramphus homochrous
- Pink-throated becard, Pachyramphus minor

== Sharpbill ==
Order: Passeriformes Family: Oxyruncidae

The sharpbill is a small bird of dense forests in Central and South America. It feeds mostly on fruit but also eats insects.

- Sharpbill, Oxyruncus cristatus

== Royal flycatchers ==
Order: Passeriformes Family: Onychorhynchidae

In 2019 the SACC determined that these five species, which were formerly considered tyrant flycatchers, belonged in their own family.

- Tropical royal-flycatcher, Onychorhynchus coronatus
- Ruddy-tailed flycatcher, Terenotriccus erythrurus
- Tawny-breasted flycatcher, Myiobius villosus
- Sulphur-rumped flycatcher, Myiobius barbatus
- Black-tailed flycatcher, Myiobius atricaudus

== Tyrant flycatchers ==
Order: Passeriformes Family: Tyrannidae

Tyrant flycatchers are passerine birds which occur throughout North and South America. They superficially resemble the Old World flycatchers, but are more robust and have stronger bills. They do not have the sophisticated vocal capabilities of the songbirds. Most, but not all, have plain coloring. As the name implies, most are insectivorous. Two hundred nine species have been recorded in Ecuador.

- Wing-barred piprites, Piprites chloris
- Cinnamon manakin-tyrant, Neopipo cinnamomea
- Cinnamon-crested spadebill, Platyrinchus saturatus
- White-throated spadebill, Platyrinchus mystaceus
- Golden-crowned spadebill, Platyrinchus coronatus
- Yellow-throated spadebill, Platyrinchus flavigularis
- White-crested spadebill, Platyrinchus platyrhynchos
- Bronze-olive pygmy-tyrant, Pseudotriccus pelzelni
- Rufous-headed pygmy-tyrant, Pseudotriccus ruficeps
- Ringed antpipit, Corythopis torquatus
- Marble-faced bristle-tyrant, Pogonotriccus ophthalmicus
- Variegated bristle-tyrant, Pogonotriccus poecilotis
- Spectacled bristle-tyrant, Pogonotriccus orbitalis
- Ecuadorian tyrannulet, Phylloscartes gualaquizae
- Rufous-browed tyrannulet, Phylloscartes superciliaris
- Streak-necked flycatcher, Mionectes striaticollis
- Olive-striped flycatcher, Mionectes olivaceus
- Ochre-bellied flycatcher, Mionectes oleagineus
- Sepia-capped flycatcher, Leptopogon amaurocephalus
- Slaty-capped flycatcher, Leptopogon superciliaris
- Rufous-breasted flycatcher, Leptopogon rufipectus
- Brownish twistwing, Cnipodectes subbrunneus
- Olivaceous flatbill, Rhynchocyclus olivaceus
- Pacific flatbill, Rhynchocyclus pacificus
- Fulvous-breasted flatbill, Rhynchocyclus fulvipectus
- Yellow-winged flatbill, Tolmomyias flavotectus
- Orange-eyed flatbill, Tolmomyias traylori
- Yellow-margined flatbill, Tolmomyias assimilis
- Gray-crowned flatbill, Tolmomyias poliocephalus
- Olive-faced flatbill, Tolmomyias viridiceps
- Yellow-olive flatbill, Tolmomyias sulphurescens
- White-bellied pygmy-tyrant, Myiornis albiventris
- Black-capped pygmy-tyrant, Myiornis atricapillus
- Short-tailed pygmy-tyrant, Myiornis ecaudatus
- Scale-crested pygmy-tyrant, Lophotriccus pileatus
- Double-banded pygmy-tyrant, Lophotriccus vitiosus
- White-eyed tody-tyrant, Hemitriccus zosterops
- Johannes's tody-tyrant, Hemitriccus iohannis
- Zimmer's tody-tyrant, Hemitriccus minimus
- Black-throated tody-tyrant, Hemitriccus granadensis
- Cinnamon-breasted tody-tyrant, Hemitriccus cinnamomeipectus
- Buff-throated tody-tyrant, Hemitriccus rufigularis
- Rufous-crowned tody-flycatcher, Poecilotriccus ruficeps
- Black-and-white tody-flycatcher, Poecilotriccus capitalis
- Rusty-fronted tody-flycatcher, Poecilotriccus latirostris
- Golden-winged tody-flycatcher, Poecilotriccus calopterus
- Spotted tody-flycatcher, Todirostrum maculatum
- Common tody-flycatcher, Todirostrum cinereum
- Black-headed tody-flycatcher, Todirostrum nigriceps
- Yellow-browed tody-flycatcher, Todirostrum chrysocrotaphum
- Ornate flycatcher, Myiotriccus ornatus
- Handsome flycatcher, Nephelomyias pulcher
- Orange-banded flycatcher, Nephelomyias lintoni
- Cliff flycatcher, Hirundinea ferruginea
- Cinnamon flycatcher, Pyrrhomyias cinnamomeus
- Choco tyrannulet, Zimmerius albigularis
- Red-billed tyrannulet, Zimmerius cinereicapilla
- Slender-footed tyrannulet, Zimmerius gracilipes
- Golden-faced tyrannulet, Zimmerius chrysops
- Peruvian tyrannulet, Zimmerius viridiflavus
- Lesser wagtail-tyrant, Stigmatura napensis
- Fulvous-faced scrub-tyrant, Euscarthmus fulviceps
- Yellow-bellied elaenia, Elaenia flavogaster
- Large elaenia, Elaenia spectabilis
- White-crested elaenia, Elaenia albiceps
- Small-billed elaenia, Elaenia parvirostris
- Slaty elaenia, Elaenia strepera (V)
- Mottle-backed elaenia, Elaenia gigas
- Brownish elaenia, Elaenia pelzelni (U)
- Lesser elaenia, Elaenia chiriquensis
- Coopmans's elaenia, Elaenia brachyptera
- Highland elaenia, Elaenia obscura
- Sierran elaenia, Elaenia pallatangae
- Yellow-crowned tyrannulet, Tyrannulus elatus
- Forest elaenia, Myiopagis gaimardii
- Gray elaenia, Myiopagis caniceps
- Foothill elaenia, Myiopagis olallai
- Pacific elaenia, Myiopagis subplacens
- Yellow-crowned elaenia, Myiopagis flavivertex
- Greenish elaenia, Myiopagis viridicata
- Yellow tyrannulet, Capsiempis flaveola
- White-tailed tyrannulet, Mecocerculus poecilocercus
- White-banded tyrannulet, Mecocerculus stictopterus
- White-throated tyrannulet, Mecocerculus leucophrys
- Rufous-winged tyrannulet, Mecocerculus calopterus
- Sulphur-bellied tyrannulet, Mecocerculus minor
- Sooty-headed tyrannulet, Phyllomyias griseiceps
- Plumbeous-crowned tyrannulet, Phyllomyias plumbeiceps
- White-fronted tyrannulet, Acrochordopus zeledoni
- Ashy-headed tyrannulet, Tyranniscus cinereiceps
- Black-capped tyrannulet, Tyranniscus nigrocapillus
- Tawny-rumped tyrannulet, Tyranniscus uropygialis
- Pacific beardless-tyrannulet, Camptostoma sclateri
- Amazonian beardless-tyrannulet, Camptostoma napaeum
- Brown-capped tyrannulet, Ornithion brunneicapillus
- White-lored tyrannulet, Ornithion inerme
- Mouse-colored tyrannulet, Nesotriccus murinus
- Marañon tyrannulet, Nesotriccus maranonicus
- Tumbesian tyrannulet, Nesotriccus tumbezanus
- Gray-and-white tyrannulet, Pseudelaenia leucospodia
- Black-crested tit-tyrant, Anairetes nigrocristatus
- Tufted tit-tyrant, Anairetes parulus
- Subtropical doradito, Pseudocolopteryx acutipennis
- Torrent tyrannulet, Serpophaga cinerea
- River tyrannulet, Serpophaga hypoleuca
- Agile tit-tyrant, Uromyias agilis
- Short-tailed field tyrant, Muscigralla brevicauda
- Cinnamon attila, Attila cinnamomeus
- Ochraceous attila, Attila torridus
- Citron-bellied attila, Attila citriniventris
- Bright-rumped attila, Attila spadiceus
- Piratic flycatcher, Legatus leucophaius
- Large-headed flatbill, Ramphotrigon megacephalum
- Rufous-tailed flatbill, Ramphotrigon ruficauda
- Dusky-tailed flatbill, Ramphotrigon fuscicauda
- Great kiskadee, Pitangus sulphuratus
- Lesser kiskadee, Philohydor lictor
- Cattle tyrant, Machetornis rixosa
- Sulphury flycatcher, Tyrannopsis sulphurea
- Boat-billed flycatcher, Megarynchus pitangua
- Golden-bellied flycatcher, Myiodynastes hemichrysus
- Baird's flycatcher, Myiodynastes bairdii
- Sulphur-bellied flycatcher, Myiodynastes luteiventris
- Streaked flycatcher, Myiodynastes maculatus
- Rusty-margined flycatcher, Myiozetetes cayanensis
- Social flycatcher, Myiozetetes similis
- Gray-capped flycatcher, Myiozetetes granadensis
- Dusky-chested flycatcher, Myiozetetes luteiventris
- White-ringed flycatcher, Conopias albovittatus
- Yellow-throated flycatcher, Conopias parvus
- Three-striped flycatcher, Conopias trivirgatus
- Lemon-browed flycatcher, Conopias cinchoneti
- Variegated flycatcher, Empidonomus varius
- Crowned slaty flycatcher, Empidonomus aurantioatrocristatus
- Snowy-throated kingbird, Tyrannus niveigularis
- White-throated kingbird, Tyrannus albogularis
- Tropical kingbird, Tyrannus melancholicus
- Fork-tailed flycatcher, Tyrannus savana
- Eastern kingbird, Tyrannus tyrannus
- Gray kingbird, Tyrannus dominicensis (V)
- Rufous mourner, Rhytipterna holerythra
- Grayish mourner, Rhytipterna simplex
- Choco sirystes, Sirystes albogriseus
- Rufous flycatcher, Myiarchus semirufus (V)
- White-rumped sirystes, Sirystes albocinereus
- Dusky-capped flycatcher, Myiarchus tuberculifer
- Swainson's flycatcher, Myiarchus swainsoni
- Panama flycatcher, Myiarchus panamensis
- Short-crested flycatcher, Myiarchus ferox
- Sooty-crowned flycatcher, Myiarchus phaeocephalus
- Pale-edged flycatcher, Myiarchus cephalotes
- Great crested flycatcher, Myiarchus crinitus
- Brown-crested flycatcher, Myiarchus tyrannulus (U)
- Galapagos flycatcher, Myiarchus magnirostris (EG)
- Long-tailed tyrant, Colonia colonus
- Flavescent flycatcher, Myiophobus flavicans
- Orange-crested flycatcher, Myiophobus phoenicomitra
- Roraiman flycatcher, Myiophobus roraimae
- Olive-chested flycatcher, Myiophobus cryptoxanthus
- Bran-colored flycatcher, Myiophobus fasciatus
- Mouse-gray flycatcher, Myiophobus crypterythrus
- Crowned chat-tyrant, Silvicultrix frontalis
- Yellow-bellied chat-tyrant, Silvicultrix diadema
- Jelski's chat-tyrant, Silvicultrix jelskii
- Slaty-backed chat-tyrant, Ochthoeca cinnamomeiventris
- Rufous-breasted chat-tyrant, Ochthoeca rufipectoralis
- Piura chat-tyrant, Ochthoeca piurae (U)
- Brown-backed chat-tyrant, Ochthoeca fumicolor
- White-browed chat-tyrant, Ochthoeca leucophrys
- Tumbes tyrant, Tumbezia salvini
- Amazonian scrub-flycatcher, Sublegatus obscurior
- Southern scrub-flycatcher, Sublegatus modestus (V)
- Vermilion flycatcher, Pyrocephalus rubinus
- Brujo flycatcher, Pyrocephalus nanus (EG)
- Pied water tyrant, Fluvicola pica (V)
- Masked water tyrant, Fluvicola nengeta
- White-headed marsh tyrant, Arundinicola leucocephala (U)
- Riverside tyrant, Knipolegus orenocensis
- Rufous-tailed tyrant, Knipolegus poecilurus
- Amazonian black-tyrant, Knipolegus poecilocercus
- Jelski's black-tyrant, Knipolegus signatus
- Little ground-tyrant, Muscisaxicola fluviatilis (V)
- Spot-billed ground-tyrant, Muscisaxicola maculirostris
- Dark-faced ground-tyrant, Muscisaxicola maclovianus (V)
- White-browed ground-tyrant, Muscisaxicola albilora
- Plain-capped ground-tyrant, Muscisaxicola alpinus
- Red-rumped bush-tyrant, Cnemarchus erythropygius
- Black-billed shrike-tyrant, Agriornis montanus
- White-tailed shrike-tyrant, Agriornis albicauda
- Streak-throated bush-tyrant, Myiotheretes striaticollis
- Smoky bush-tyrant, Myiotheretes fumigatus
- Drab water tyrant, Ochthornis littoralis
- Fuscous flycatcher, Cnemotriccus fuscatus
- Euler's flycatcher, Lathrotriccus euleri
- Gray-breasted flycatcher, Lathrotriccus griseipectus
- Tufted flycatcher, Mitrephanes phaeocercus
- Black phoebe, Sayornis nigricans
- Acadian flycatcher, Empidonax virescens
- Willow flycatcher, Empidonax traillii
- Alder flycatcher, Empidonax alnorum
- Olive-sided flycatcher, Contopus cooperi
- Smoke-colored pewee, Contopus fumigatus
- Western wood-pewee, Contopus sordidulus
- Eastern wood-pewee, Contopus virens
- Tropical pewee, Contopus cinereus
- Blackish pewee, Contopus nigrescens

== Vireos ==
Order: Passeriformes Family: Vireonidae

The vireos are a group of small to medium-sized passerine birds. They are typically greenish in color and resemble wood warblers apart from their heavier bills. Seventeen species have been recorded in Ecuador.

- Rufous-browed peppershrike, Cyclarhis gujanensis
- Black-billed peppershrike, Cyclarhis nigrirostris
- Olivaceous greenlet, Hylophilus olivaceus
- Lemon-chested greenlet, Hylophilus thoracicus
- Slaty-capped shrike-vireo, Vireolanius leucotis
- Ochre-crowned brownlet, Tunchiornis ochraceiceps
- Rufous-fronted brownlet, Tunchiornis ferrugineifrons
- Lesser greenlet, Pachysylvia decurtata
- Dusky-capped greenlet, Pachysylvia hypoxantha
- Rufous-naped greenlet, Pachysylvia semibrunnea
- Yellow-throated vireo, Vireo flavifrons (V)
- Choco vireo, Vireo masteri
- Philadelphia vireo, Vireo philadelphicus (V)
- Brown-capped vireo, Vireo leucophrys
- Red-eyed vireo, Vireo olivaceus
- Chivi vireo, Vireo chivi
- Yellow-green vireo, Vireo flavoviridis
- Black-whiskered vireo, Vireo altiloquus (V)

== Jays ==
Order: Passeriformes Family: Corvidae

The family Corvidae includes crows, ravens, jays, choughs, magpies, treepies, nutcrackers, and ground jays. Corvids are above average in size for the Passeriformes. Some of the larger species show high levels of intelligence. Six species have been recorded in Ecuador.

- Black-collared jay, Cyanolyca armillata
- Turquoise jay, Cyanolyca turcosa
- Beautiful jay, Cyanolyca pulchra
- Violaceous jay, Cyanocorax violaceus
- White-tailed jay, Cyanocorax mystacalis
- Green jay, Cyanocorax yncas

== Swallows ==
Order: Passeriformes Family: Hirundinidae

The family Hirundinidae is adapted to aerial feeding. They have a slender streamlined body, long pointed wings, and a short bill with a wide gape. The feet are adapted to perching rather than walking, and the front toes are partially joined at the base. Twenty species have been recorded in Ecuador.

- Blue-and-white swallow, Pygochelidon cyanoleuca
- Black-collared swallow, Pygochelidon melanoleuca (U)
- Brown-bellied swallow, Orochelidon murina
- Pale-footed swallow, Orochelidon flavipes
- White-banded swallow, Atticora fasciata
- White-thighed swallow, Atticora tibialis
- Southern rough-winged swallow, Stelgidopteryx ruficollis
- Brown-chested martin, Progne tapera
- Purple martin, Progne subis
- Gray-breasted martin, Progne chalybea
- Southern martin, Progne elegans
- Galapagos martin, Progne modesta (EG)
- Tree swallow, Tachycineta bicolor (U)
- Tumbes swallow, Tachycineta stolzmanni
- White-winged swallow, Tachycineta albiventer
- White-rumped swallow, Tachycineta leucorrhoa (V)
- Bank swallow, Riparia riparia
- Barn swallow, Hirundo rustica
- Cliff swallow, Petrochelidon pyrrhonota
- Chestnut-collared swallow, Petrochelidon rufocollaris

== Wrens ==
Order: Passeriformes Family: Troglodytidae

The wrens are mainly small and inconspicuous except for their loud songs. These birds have short wings and thin down-turned bills. Several species often hold their tails upright. All are insectivorous. Twenty-five species have been recorded in Ecuador.

- Scaly-breasted wren, Microcerculus marginatus
- Wing-banded wren, Microcerculus bambla
- Gray-mantled wren, Odontorchilus branickii
- Southern house-wren, Troglodytes musculus
- Mountain wren, Troglodytes solstitialis
- Grass wren, Cistothorus platensis
- Band-backed wren, Campylorhynchus zonatus
- Fasciated wren, Campylorhynchus fasciatus
- Thrush-like wren, Campylorhynchus turdinus
- Plain-tailed wren, Pheugopedius euophrys
- Whiskered wren, Pheugopedius mystacalis
- Coraya wren, Pheugopedius coraya
- Speckle-breasted wren, Pheugopedius sclateri
- Stripe-throated wren, Cantorchilus leucopogon
- Bay wren, Cantorchilus nigricapillus
- Superciliated wren, Cantorchilus superciliaris
- Buff-breasted wren, Cantorchilus leucotis
- Rufous wren, Cinnycerthia unirufa
- Sharpe's wren, Cinnycerthia olivascens
- White-breasted wood-wren, Henicorhina leucosticta
- Bar-winged wood-wren, Henicorhina leucoptera
- Gray-breasted wood-wren, Henicorhina leucophrys
- Chestnut-breasted wren, Cyphorhinus thoracicus
- Song wren, Cyphorhinus phaeocephalus
- Musician wren, Cyphorhinus arada

== Gnatcatchers ==
Order: Passeriformes Family: Polioptilidae

These dainty birds resemble Old World warblers in their build and habits, moving restlessly through the foliage seeking insects. The gnatcatchers and gnatwrens are mainly soft bluish gray in color and have the typical insectivore's long sharp bill. They are birds of fairly open woodland or scrub which nest in bushes or trees. Five species have been recorded in Ecuador.

- Collared gnatwren, Microbates collaris
- Half-collared gnatwren, Microbates cinereiventris
- Trilling gnatwren, Ramphocaenus melanurus
- Tropical gnatcatcher, Polioptila plumbea
- Slate-throated gnatcatcher, Polioptila schistaceigula

== Donacobius ==
Order: Passeriformes Family: Donacobiidae

The black-capped donacobius is found in wet habitats from Panama across northern South America and east of the Andes to Argentina and Paraguay.

- Black-capped donacobius, Donacobius atricapilla

== Dippers ==
Order: Passeriformes Family: Cinclidae

Dippers are a group of perching birds whose habitat includes aquatic environments in the Americas, Europe and Asia. They are named for their bobbing or dipping movements. One species has been recorded in Ecuador.

- White-capped dipper, Cinclus leucocephalus

== Waxwings ==
Order: Passeriformes Family: Bombycillidae

The waxwings are a group of birds with soft silky plumage and unique red tips to some of the wing feathers. In the Bohemian and cedar waxwings, these tips look like sealing wax and give the group its name. These are arboreal birds of northern forests. They live on insects in summer and berries in winter. One species has been recorded in Ecuador.

- Cedar waxwing, Bombycilla cedrorum (U)

== Thrushes ==
Order: Passeriformes Family: Turdidae

The thrushes are a group of passerine birds that occur mainly in the Old World. They are plump, soft plumaged, small to medium-sized insectivores or sometimes omnivores, often feeding on the ground. Many have attractive songs. Twenty-two species have been recorded in Ecuador.

- Andean solitaire, Myadestes ralloides
- Slaty-backed nightingale-thrush, Catharus fuscater
- Speckled nightingale thrush, Catharus maculatus
- Gray-cheeked thrush, Catharus minimus
- Swainson's thrush, Catharus ustulatus
- Black solitaire, Entomodestes coracinus
- Rufous-brown solitaire, Cichlopsis leucogenys
- Pale-eyed thrush, Turdus leucops
- Plumbeous-backed thrush, Turdus reevei
- Hauxwell's thrush, Turdus hauxwelli
- Pale-vented thrush, Turdus obsoletus
- Ecuadorian thrush, Turdus maculirostris
- Lawrence's thrush, Turdus lawrencii
- Black-billed thrush, Turdus ignobilis
- Marañon thrush, Turdus maranonicus
- Chestnut-bellied thrush, Turdus fulviventris
- Andean slaty thrush, Turdus nigriceps
- Great thrush, Turdus fuscater
- Chiguanco thrush, Turdus chiguanco
- Glossy-black thrush, Turdus serranus
- Dagua thrush, Turdus daguae
- Gray-flanked thrush, Turdus phaeopygus

== Mockingbirds ==
Order: Passeriformes Family: Mimidae

The mimids are a family of passerine birds that includes thrashers, mockingbirds, tremblers, and the New World catbirds. These birds are notable for their vocalizations, especially their ability to mimic a wide variety of birds and other sounds heard outdoors. Their coloring tends towards dull-grays and browns. Six species have been recorded in Ecuador.

- Tropical mockingbird, Mimus gilvus
- Long-tailed mockingbird, Mimus longicaudatus
- Galapagos mockingbird, Mimus parvulus (EG)
- Floreana mockingbird, Mimus trifasciatus (EG)
- Española mockingbird, Mimus macdonaldi (EG)
- San Cristobal mockingbird, Mimus melanotis (EG)

== Estreldids ==
Order: Passeriformes Family: Estrildidae

The estrildid finches are small passerine birds of the Old World tropics and Australasia. They are gregarious and often colonial seed eaters with short thick but pointed bills. They are all similar in structure and habits, but have wide variation in plumage colors and patterns. One species has been recorded in Ecuador

- Tricolored munia, Lonchura malacca (I)

== Old World sparrows ==
Order: Passeriformes Family: Passeridae

Sparrows are small passerine birds. In general, sparrows tend to be small, plump, brown or gray birds with short tails and short powerful beaks. Sparrows are seed eaters, but they also consume small insects. One species has been recorded in Ecuador.

- House sparrow, Passer domesticus (I)

== Pipits and wagtails ==
Order: Passeriformes Family: Motacillidae

Motacillidae is a family of small passerine birds with medium to long tails. They include the wagtails, longclaws and pipits. They are slender, ground feeding insectivores of open country. Two species have been recorded in Ecuador.

- Red-throated pipit, Anthus cervinus (V)
- Paramo pipit, Anthus bogotensis

== Finches ==
Order: Passeriformes Family: Fringillidae

Finches are seed-eating passerine birds that are small to moderately large and have a strong beak, usually conical and in some species very large. All have twelve tail feathers and nine primaries. These birds have a bouncing flight with alternating bouts of flapping and gliding on closed wings, and most sing well. Nineteen species have been recorded in Ecuador.

- Andean siskin, Spinus spinescens
- Hooded siskin, Spinus magellanicus
- Saffron siskin, Spinus siemiradzkii
- Olivaceous siskin, Spinus olivaceus
- Yellow-bellied siskin, Spinus xanthogastrus
- Lesser goldfinch, Spinus psaltria
- Golden-rumped euphonia, Chlorophonia cyanocephala
- Blue-naped chlorophonia, Chlorophonia cyanea
- Chestnut-breasted chlorophonia, Chlorophonia pyrrhophrys
- Yellow-collared chlorophonia, Chlorophonia flavirostris
- Orange-crowned euphonia, Euphonia saturata
- Purple-throated euphonia, Euphonia chlorotica
- Golden-bellied euphonia, Euphonia chrysopasta
- White-vented euphonia, Euphonia minuta
- Thick-billed euphonia, Euphonia laniirostris
- Fulvous-vented euphonia, Euphonia fulvicrissa
- Orange-bellied euphonia, Euphonia xanthogaster
- Bronze-green euphonia, Euphonia mesochrysa
- Rufous-bellied euphonia, Euphonia rufiventris

== Sparrows ==
Order: Passeriformes Family: Passerellidae

Most of the species are known as sparrows, but these birds are not closely related to the Old World sparrows which are in the family Passeridae. Many of these have distinctive head patterns. Twenty-seven species have been recorded in Ecuador.

- Tanager finch, Oreothraupis arremonops
- Yellow-throated chlorospingus, Chlorospingus flavigularis
- Short-billed chlorospingus, Chlorospingus parvirostris
- Ashy-throated chlorospingus, Chlorospingus canigularis
- Common chlorospingus, Chlorospingus flavopectus
- Dusky chlorospingus, Chlorospingus semifuscus
- Tumbes sparrow, Rhynchospiza stolzmanni
- Grasshopper sparrow, Ammodramus savannarum (extirpated)
- Yellow-browed sparrow, Ammodramus aurifrons
- Black-striped sparrow, Arremonops conirostris
- Gray-browed brushfinch, Arremon assimilis
- Orange-billed sparrow, Arremon aurantiirostris
- Black-capped sparrow, Arremon abeillei
- Chestnut-capped brushfinch, Arremon brunneinucha
- Olive finch, Arremon castaneiceps
- Rufous-collared sparrow, Zonotrichia capensis
- White-naped brushfinch, Atlapetes albinucha
- White-rimmed brushfinch, Atlapetes leucopis
- White-headed brushfinch, Atlapetes albiceps
- Tricolored brushfinch, Atlapetes tricolor
- Slaty brushfinch, Atlapetes schistaceus
- Pale-naped brushfinch, Atlapetes pallidinucha
- Yellow-breasted brushfinch, Atlapetes latinuchus
- White-winged brushfinch, Atlapetes leucopterus
- Pale-headed brushfinch, Atlapetes pallidiceps (EM)
- Bay-crowned brushfinch, Atlapetes seebohmi

== Blackbirds ==
Order: Passeriformes Family: Icteridae

The icterids are a group of small to medium-sized, often colorful, passerine birds restricted to the New World which include the grackles, New World blackbirds, and New World orioles. Most species have black as the predominant plumage color, often enlivened by yellow, orange, or red. Thirty-two species have been recorded in Ecuador.

- Bobolink, Dolichonyx oryzivorus (V)
- Eastern meadowlark, Sturnella magna (U)
- Red-breasted meadowlark, Leistes militaris
- Peruvian meadowlark, Leistes bellicosus
- Yellow-billed cacique, Amblycercus holosericeus
- Russet-backed oropendola, Psarocolius angustifrons
- Green oropendola, Psarocolius viridis
- Chestnut-headed oropendola, Psarocolius wagleri
- Crested oropendola, Psarocolius decumanus
- Olive oropendola, Psarocolius bifasciatus
- Solitary black cacique, Cacicus solitarius
- Ecuadorian cacique, Cacicus sclateri
- Scarlet-rumped cacique, Cacicus uropygialis
- Yellow-rumped cacique, Cacicus cela
- Mountain cacique, Cacicus chrysonotus
- Band-tailed cacique, Cacicus latirostris
- Red-rumped cacique, Cacicus haemorrhous
- Casqued cacique, Cacicus oseryi
- Orange-backed troupial, Icterus croconotus
- White-edged oriole, Icterus graceannae
- Yellow-tailed oriole, Icterus mesomelas
- Epaulet oriole, Icterus cayanensis
- Orchard oriole, Icterus spurius (U)
- Yellow-backed oriole, Icterus chrysater
- Baltimore oriole, Icterus galbula (V)
- Giant cowbird, Molothrus oryzivorus
- Shiny cowbird, Molothrus bonariensis
- Scrub blackbird, Dives warczewiczi
- Carib grackle, Quiscalus lugubris
- Great-tailed grackle, Quiscalus mexicanus
- Velvet-fronted grackle, Lampropsar tanagrinus
- Oriole blackbird, Gymnomystax mexicanus
- Pale-eyed blackbird, Agelasticus xanthophthalmus

== New World warblers ==
Order: Passeriformes Family: Parulidae

The New World warblers are a group of small, often colorful, passerine birds restricted to the New World. Most are arboreal, but some are terrestrial. Most members of this family are insectivores. Thirty-three species have been recorded in Ecuador.

- Ovenbird, Seiurus aurocapilla (V)
- Northern waterthrush, Parkesia noveboracensis
- Golden-winged warbler, Vermivora chrysoptera
- Black-and-white warbler, Mniotilta varia
- Prothonotary warbler, Protonotaria citrea
- Tennessee warbler, Leiothlypis peregrina
- Connecticut warbler, Oporornis agilis (V)
- Masked yellowthroat, Geothlypis aequinoctialis
- Mourning warbler, Geothlypis philadelphia
- Olive-crowned yellowthroat, Geothlypis semiflava
- American redstart, Setophaga ruticilla
- Cerulean warbler, Setophaga cerulea
- Tropical parula, Setophaga pitiayumi
- Bay-breasted warbler, Setophaga castanea
- Blackburnian warbler, Setophaga fusca
- Yellow warbler, Setophaga petechia
- Chestnut-sided warbler, Setophaga pensylvanica (V)
- Blackpoll warbler, Setophaga striata
- Black-throated blue warbler, Setophaga caerulescens (V)
- Yellow-rumped warbler, Setophaga coronata (U)
- Black-throated green warbler, Setophaga virens (V)
- Citrine warbler, Myiothlypis luteoviridis
- Black-crested warbler, Myiothlypis nigrocristata
- Buff-rumped warbler, Myiothlypis fulvicauda
- Golden-bellied warbler, Myiothlypis chrysogaster
- Gray-and-gold warbler, Myiothlypis fraseri
- Russet-crowned warbler, Myiothlypis coronata
- Three-striped warbler, Basileuterus tristriatus
- Three-banded warbler, Basileuterus trifasciatus
- Canada warbler, Cardellina canadensis
- Wilson's warbler, Cardellina pusilla (V)
- Slate-throated whitestart, Myioborus miniatus
- Spectacled whitestart, Myioborus melanocephalus

== Mitrospingids ==
Order: Passeriformes Family: Mitrospingidae

Until 2017 the four species in this family were included in the family Thraupidae, the "true" tanagers.

- Dusky-faced tanager, Mitrospingus cassinii

== Cardinal grosbeaks ==
Order: Passeriformes Family: Cardinalidae

The cardinals are a family of robust seed-eating birds with strong bills. They are typically associated with open woodland. The sexes usually have distinct plumages. Nineteen species have been recorded in Ecuador.

- Hepatic tanager, Piranga flava
- Summer tanager, Piranga rubra
- Scarlet tanager, Piranga olivacea
- Western tanager, Piranga ludoviciana (V)
- Red-hooded tanager, Piranga rubriceps
- White-winged tanager, Piranga leucoptera
- Red-crowned ant-tanager, Habia rubica
- Ochre-breasted tanager, Chlorothraupis stolzmanni
- Lemon-spectacled tanager, Chlorothraupis olivacea
- Yellow-lored tanager, Chlorothraupis frenata
- Golden grosbeak, Pheucticus chrysogaster
- Black-backed grosbeak, Pheucticus aureoventris
- Rose-breasted grosbeak, Pheucticus ludovicianus
- Ecuadorian seedeater, Amaurospiza aequatorialis
- Blue-black grosbeak, Cyanoloxia cyanoides
- Amazonian grosbeak, Cyanoloxia rothschildii
- Blue grosbeak, Passerina caerulea (V)
- Indigo bunting, Passerina cyanea (V)
- Dickcissel, Spiza americana (V)

== Tanagers ==
Order: Passeriformes Family: Thraupidae

The tanagers are a large group of small to medium-sized passerine birds restricted to the New World, mainly in the tropics. Many species are brightly colored. As a family they are omnivorous, but individual species specialize in eating fruits, seeds, insects, or other types of food. Most have short, rounded wings. One hundred seventy-seven species have been recorded in Ecuador.

- White-capped tanager, Sericossypha albocristata
- Yellow-shouldered grosbeak, Parkerthraustes humeralis
- Plushcap, Catamblyrhynchus diadema
- Green honeycreeper, Chlorophanes spiza
- Golden-collared honeycreeper, Iridophanes pulcherrimus
- Scarlet-and-white tanager, Chrysothlypis salmoni
- Scarlet-browed tanager, Heterospingus xanthopygius
- Guira tanager, Hemithraupis guira
- Yellow-backed tanager, Hemithraupis flavicollis
- Bicolored conebill, Conirostrum bicolor
- Pearly-breasted conebill, Conirostrum margaritae (U)
- Chestnut-vented conebill, Conirostrum speciosum
- Giant conebill, Conirostrum binghami
- Blue-backed conebill, Conirostrum sitticolor
- Capped conebill, Conirostrum albifrons
- Cinereous conebill, Conirostrum cinereum
- Saffron finch, Sicalis flaveola
- Grassland yellow-finch, Sicalis luteola
- Sulphur-throated finch, Sicalis taczanowskii
- Plumbeous sierra finch, Geospizopsis unicolor
- Ash-breasted sierra finch, Geospizopsis plebejus
- Band-tailed sierra finch, Rhopospina alaudina
- Band-tailed seedeater, Catamenia analis
- Plain-colored seedeater, Catamenia inornata
- Paramo seedeater, Catamenia homochroa
- Glossy flowerpiercer, Diglossa lafresnayii
- Black flowerpiercer, Diglossa humeralis
- Black-throated flowerpiercer, Diglossa brunneiventris
- White-sided flowerpiercer, Diglossa albilatera
- Indigo flowerpiercer, Diglossa indigotica
- Rusty flowerpiercer, Diglossa sittoides
- Deep-blue flowerpiercer, Diglossa glauca
- Bluish flowerpiercer, Diglossa caerulescens
- Warbling masked-flowerpiercer, Diglossa cyanea (E-SA)
- Tit-like dacnis, Xenodacnis parina
- Slaty finch, Haplospiza rustica
- Blue-black grassquit, Volatinia jacarina
- Black-and-white tanager, Conothraupis speculigera
- Rufous-crested tanager, Creurgops verticalis
- Flame-crested tanager, Loriotus cristatus
- White-shouldered tanager, Loriotus luctuosus
- Fulvous-crested tanager, Tachyphonus surinamus
- Tawny-crested tanager, Tachyphonus delatrii
- White-lined tanager, Tachyphonus rufus
- Gray-headed tanager, Eucometis penicillata
- Red-crested finch, Coryphospingus cucullatus
- Masked crimson tanager, Ramphocelus nigrogularis
- Silver-beaked tanager, Ramphocelus carbo
- Flame-rumped tanager, Ramphocelus flammigerus
- Fulvous shrike-tanager, Lanio fulvus
- Crimson-breasted finch, Rhodospingus cruentus
- Short-billed honeycreeper, Cyanerpes nitidus
- Purple honeycreeper, Cyanerpes caeruleus
- Red-legged honeycreeper, Cyanerpes cyaneus
- Swallow tanager, Tersina viridis
- White-bellied dacnis, Dacnis albiventris
- Yellow-tufted dacnis, Dacnis egregia
- Black-faced dacnis, Dacnis lineata
- Yellow-bellied dacnis, Dacnis flaviventer
- Scarlet-thighed dacnis, Dacnis venusta
- Blue dacnis, Dacnis cayana
- Scarlet-breasted dacnis, Dacnis berlepschi
- Lesson's seedeater, Sporophila bouvronides
- Lined seedeater, Sporophila lineola
- Parrot-billed seedeater, Sporophila peruviana
- Chestnut-throated seedeater, Sporophila telasco
- Drab seedeater, Sporophila simplex
- Chestnut-bellied seedeater, Sporophila castaneiventris
- Ruddy-breasted seedeater, Sporophila minuta
- Thick-billed seed-finch, Sporophila funerea
- Chestnut-bellied seed-finch, Sporophila angolensis
- Large-billed seed-finch, Sporophila crassirostris
- Black-billed seed-finch, Sporophila atrirostris
- Variable seedeater, Sporophila corvina
- Gray seedeater, Sporophila intermedia (U)
- Wing-barred seedeater, Sporophila americana
- Black-and-white seedeater, Sporophila luctuosa
- Yellow-bellied seedeater, Sporophila nigricollis
- Slate-colored seedeater, Sporophila schistacea
- Buff-throated saltator, Saltator maximus
- Black-winged saltator, Saltator atripennis
- Bluish-gray saltator, Saltator coerulescens
- Streaked saltator, Saltator striatipectus
- Black-cowled saltator, Saltator nigriceps
- Masked saltator, Saltator cinctus
- Slate-colored grosbeak, Saltator grossus
- Wedge-tailed grass-finch, Emberizoides herbicola
- Cinereous finch, Piezorina cinerea (U)
- Black-headed hemispingus, Pseudospingus verticalis
- Pink-billed cnemoscopus, Cnemoscopus rubrirostris
- Collared warbling finch, Poospiza hispaniolensis
- Black-capped hemispingus, Kleinothraupis atropileus
- Oleaginous hemispingus, Sphenopsis frontalis
- Black-eared hemispingus, Sphenopsis melanotis
- Orange-headed tanager, Thlypopsis sordida
- Buff-bellied tanager, Thlypopsis inornata
- Superciliaried hemispingus, Thlypopsis superciliaris
- Rufous-chested tanager, Thlypopsis ornata
- Black-backed bush tanager, Urothraupis stolzmanni
- Bananaquit, Coereba flaveola
- Yellow-faced grassquit, Tiaris olivaceus
- Dull-colored grassquit, Asemospiza obscura
- Green warbler-finch, Certhidea olivacea (EG)
- Gray warbler-finch, Certhidea fusca (EG)
- Vegetarian finch, Platyspiza crassirostris (EG)
- Woodpecker finch, Camarhynchus pallidus (EG)
- Large tree-finch, Camarhynchus psittacula (EG)
- Medium tree-finch, Camarhynchus pauper (EG)
- Small tree-finch, Camarhynchus parvulus (EG)
- Mangrove finch, Camarhynchus heliobates (EG)
- Sharp-beaked ground-finch, Geospiza difficilis (EG)
- Vampire ground-finch, Geospiza septentrionalis (EG)
- Small ground-finch, Geospiza fuliginosa (EG)
- Medium ground-finch, Geospiza fortis (EG)
- Genovesa ground-finch, Geospiza acutirostris (EG)
- Common cactus-finch, Geospiza scandens (EG)
- Genovesa cactus-finch, Geospiza propinqua (EG)
- Large ground-finch, Geospiza magnirostris (EG)
- Española ground-finch, Geospiza conirostris (EG)
- Glistening-green tanager, Chlorochrysa phoenicotis
- Orange-eared tanager, Chlorochrysa calliparaea
- Red-crested cardinal, Paroaria coronata
- Red-capped cardinal, Paroaria gularis
- Black-faced tanager, Schistochlamys melanopis
- Magpie tanager, Cissopis leverianus
- Vermilion tanager, Calochaetes coccineus
- Purplish-mantled tanager, Iridosornis porphyrocephalus
- Yellow-throated tanager, Iridosornis analis
- Golden-crowned tanager, Iridosornis rufivertex
- Fawn-breasted tanager, Pipraeidea melanonota
- Blue-and-yellow tanager, Rauenia bonariensis
- Buff-banded mountain tanager, Dubusia taeniata
- Lacrimose mountain tanager, Anisognathus lacrymosus
- Scarlet-bellied mountain tanager, Anisognathus igniventris
- Blue-winged mountain tanager, Anisognathus somptuosus
- Black-chinned mountain tanager, Anisognathus notabilis
- Hooded mountain tanager, Buthraupis montana
- Masked mountain tanager, Tephrophilus wetmorei
- Blue-capped tanager, Sporathraupis cyanocephala
- Grass-green tanager, Chlorornis riefferii
- Black-chested mountain tanager, Cnemathraupis eximia
- Orange-throated tanager, Wetmorethraupis sterrhopteron
- Yellow-green tanager, Bangsia flavovirens
- Golden-chested tanager, Bangsia rothschildi
- Moss-backed tanager, Bangsia edwardsi
- Golden-naped tanager, Chalcothraupis ruficervix
- Gray-and-gold tanager, Poecilostreptus palmeri
- Silvery tanager, Stilpnia viridicollis
- Black-capped tanager, Stilpnia heinei
- Green-throated tanager, Stilpnia argyrofenges
- Scrub tanager, Stilpnia vitriolina
- Masked tanager, Stilpnia nigrocincta
- Golden-hooded tanager, Stilpnia larvata
- Blue-necked tanager, Stilpnia cyanicollis
- Blue-and-black tanager, Tangara vassorii
- Beryl-spangled tanager, Tangara nigroviridis
- Metallic-green tanager, Tangara labradorides
- Blue-browed tanager, Tangara cyanotis
- Turquoise tanager, Tangara mexicana
- Paradise tanager, Tangara chilensis
- Opal-rumped tanager, Tangara velia
- Opal-crowned tanager, Tangara callophrys
- Rufous-winged tanager, Tangara lavinia
- Bay-headed tanager, Tangara gyrola
- Golden-eared tanager, Tangara chrysotis
- Saffron-crowned tanager, Tangara xanthocephala
- Flame-faced tanager, Tangara parzudakii
- Green-and-gold tanager, Tangara schrankii
- Blue-whiskered tanager, Tangara johannae
- Golden tanager, Tangara arthus
- Emerald tanager, Tangara florida
- Silver-throated tanager, Tangara icterocephala
- Blue-gray tanager, Thraupis episcopus
- Palm tanager, Thraupis palmarum
- Rufous-throated tanager, Ixothraupis rufigula
- Speckled tanager, Ixothraupis guttata
- Yellow-bellied tanager, Ixothraupis xanthogastra
- Spotted tanager, Ixothraupis punctata

== See also ==
- List of birds
- Lists of birds by region
