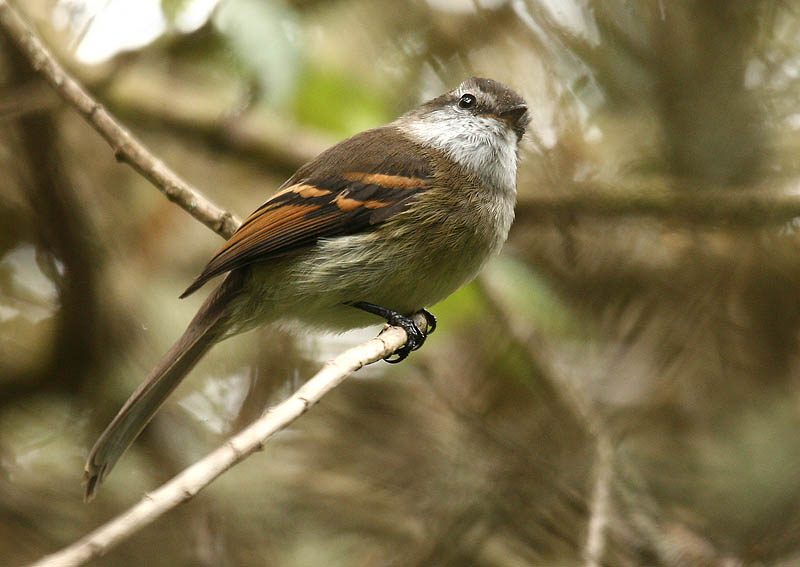
- White-throated tyrannulet (Mecocerculus leucophrys)

Scientific classification
- Kingdom: Animalia
- Phylum: Chordata
- Class: Aves
- Order: Passeriformes
- Family: Tyrannidae
- Genus: Mecocerculus; P.L. Sclater, 1862

Type species
- Tyrannula setophagoides Bonaparte, 1845

= Mecocerculus =

Genus of birds

Mecocerculus is a genus of birds in the large tyrant flycatcher family Tyrannidae.

It contains the following 6 species:

Image	Scientific name	Common name	Distribution
	Mecocerculus leucophrys	White-throated tyrannulet	Argentina, Bolivia, Brazil, Colombia, Ecuador, Peru, and Venezuela.
	Mecocerculus poecilocercus	White-tailed tyrannulet	Colombia, Ecuador, and Peru
	Mecocerculus hellmayri	Buff-banded tyrannulet	Argentina, Bolivia, and Peru
	Mecocerculus calopterus	Rufous-winged tyrannulet	Ecuador and Peru
	Mecocerculus minor	Sulphur-bellied tyrannulet	Colombia, Ecuador and Peru
	Mecocerculus stictopterus	White-banded tyrannulet	Bolivia, Colombia, Ecuador, Peru, and Venezuela
