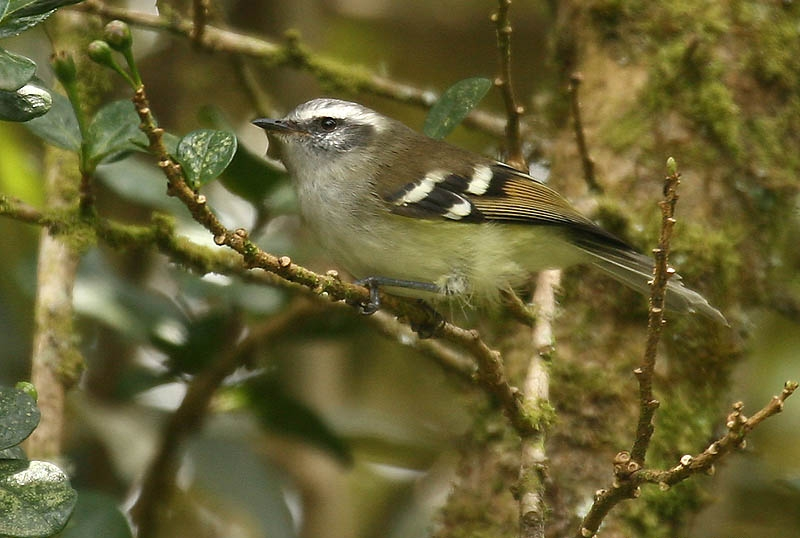

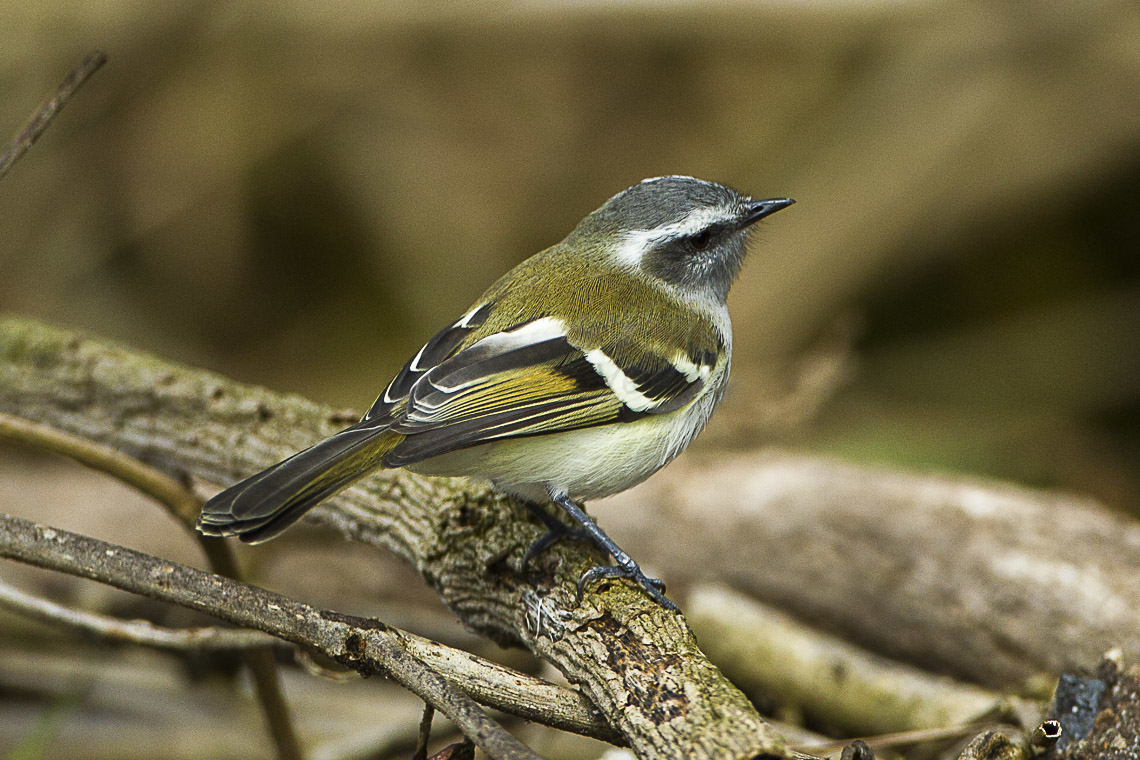

Conservation status
- Least Concern (IUCN 3.1)

Scientific classification
- Kingdom: Animalia
- Phylum: Chordata
- Class: Aves
- Order: Passeriformes
- Family: Tyrannidae
- Genus: Mecocerculus
- Species: M. stictopterus

Binomial name
- Mecocerculus stictopterus (Sclater, PL, 1859)

= White-banded tyrannulet =

Species of bird

The white-banded tyrannulet (Mecocerculus stictopterus) is a species of bird in subfamily Elaeniinae of family Tyrannidae, the tyrant flycatchers. It is found in Bolivia, Colombia, Ecuador, Peru, and Venezuela.

== Taxonomy and systematics ==
The white-banded tyrannulet has three subspecies, the nominate M. s. stictopterus (Sclater, PL, 1859), M. s. albocaudatus (Phelps, WH & Gilliard, 1941), and M. s. taeniopterus (Cabanis, 1874).

== Description ==
The white-banded tyrannulet is 12.5 to 13 cm (4.9 to 5.1 in) long and weighs 8 to 11 g (0.28 to 0.39 oz). The sexes have the same plumage. Adults of the nominate subspecies have a medium gray crown. They have a white supercilium, a blackish stripe through the eye, and a faint dusky crescent behind the ear coverts on an otherwise whitish face. Their upperparts are dark brownish olive. Their wings are dark dusky with bright yellow to ochraceous edges on the flight feathers. Their wing coverts have wide pure white tips that show as two bars on the closed wing. Their tail is dusky olive. Their throat is grayish white, their breast grayish white with a darker grayish wash, their belly whitish, and their undertail coverts pale yellow. Subspecies M. s. albocaudatus differs from the nominate only by having dull buffy white outermost tail feathers. M. s. taeniopterus has a paler gray crown, slightly lighter greener and less brown upperparts, and a paler gray wash on the breast than the nominate. Both sexes of all subspecies have a brown iris, a long thin black bill with a dull pinkish base to the mandible, and gray legs and feet.

== Distribution and habitat ==
The nominate subspecies of the white-banded tyrannulet is found from the Colombian Andes south through Ecuador on both slopes of the Andes and on the western slope into the northern Peru departments of Piura, Cajamarca, and Amazonas. Subspecies M. s. albocaudatus is found in the Andes of western Venezuela's Trujillo, Mérida, and Táchira states. M. s. taeniopterus is found on the eastern slope of the Andes from eastern La Libertad Department in northern Peru south into northern Bolivia to Santa Cruz Department. The white-banded tyrannulet inhabits humid montane evergreen forest in the temperate zone. It favors cloudforest with much moss, stunted elfin forest, somewhat open woodlands, thickets of alder (Alnus) along landslide scars, and brushy areas near treeline. In elevation it occurs between 2,000 and 3,600 m (6,600 and 11,800 ft) in Colombia, mostly between 2,400 and 3,500 m (7,900 and 11,500 ft) in Ecuador, 2,400 and 3,600 m (7,900 and 11,800 ft) in Peru, and 1,900 and 3,050 m (6,200 and 10,000 ft) in Venezuela.

== Behavior ==
=== Movement ===
The white-banded tyrannulet is a year-round resident throughout its range.

=== Feeding ===
The white-banded tyrannulet feeds mostly on insects and also includes small fruits in its diet. It usually forages in pairs or small groups and often joins mixed-species feeding flocks. It forages mostly at the outer edges of trees from the forest's mid-story to the canopy, though it also forages lower at forest edges. It takes its food by gleaning from leaves and twigs while perched (often hanging upside down) and also makes short upward flights to briefly hover.

=== Breeding ===
Observations suggest that the white-banded tyrannulet's breeding season in Colombia includes January and February and in Peru includes October and November. Nothing else is known about the species' breeding biology.

=== Vocalization ===
What is thought to be the white-banded tyrannulet's song is "a rising, wheezy rhzeee?, sometimes followed by a rich chew-bit or a scratchy, thin, rising-falling chatter".

== Status ==
The IUCN has assessed the white-banded tyrannulet as being of Least Concern. It has a large range; its population size is not known and is believed to be stable. No immediate threats have been identified. It is considered common in Colombia, widespread in Ecuador, common in Peru, and fairly common in Venezuela. It occurs in many protected areas including at least one in every country in its range.
