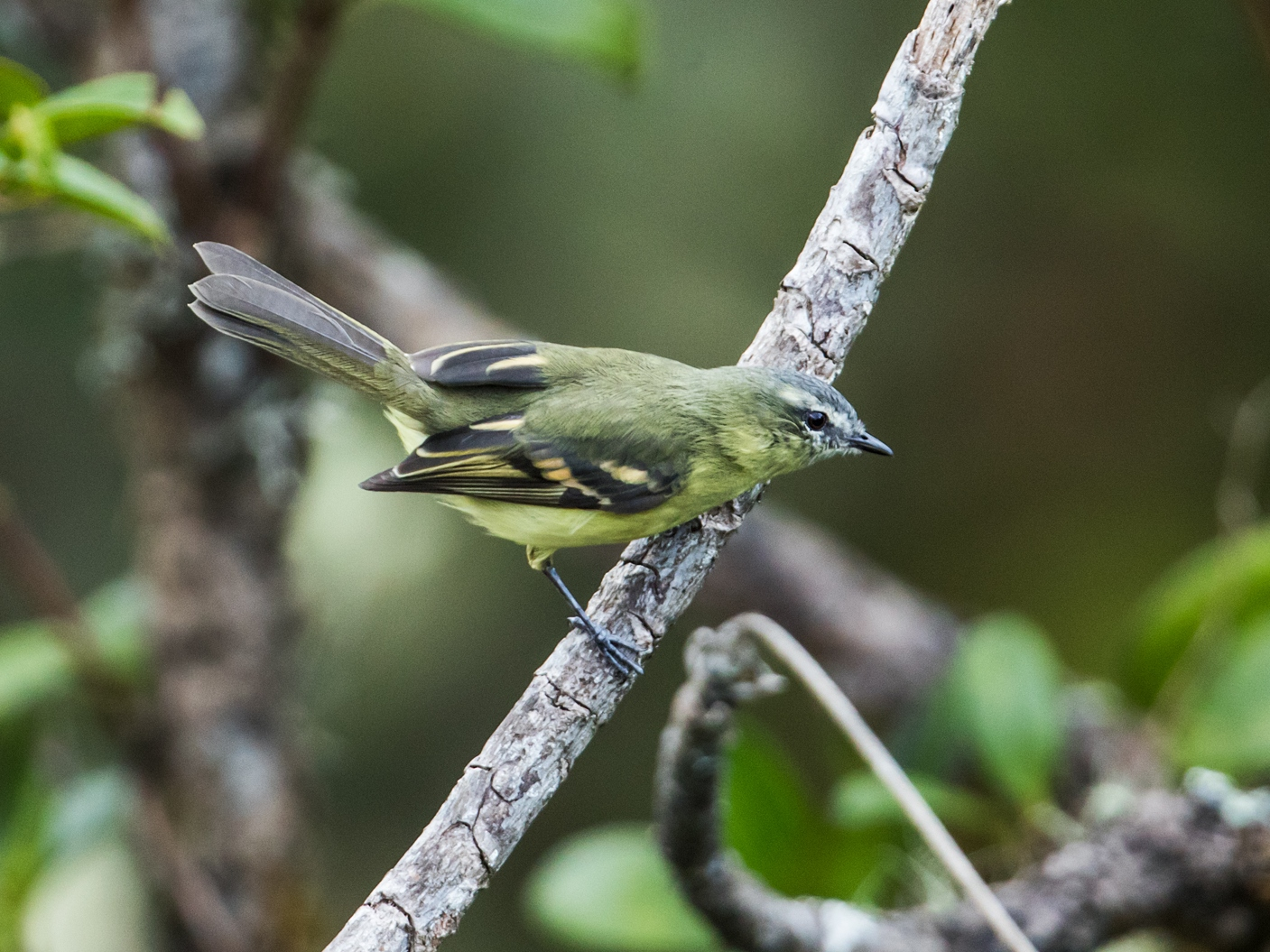

Conservation status
- Least Concern (IUCN 3.1)

Scientific classification
- Kingdom: Animalia
- Phylum: Chordata
- Class: Aves
- Order: Passeriformes
- Family: Tyrannidae
- Genus: Mecocerculus
- Species: M. minor

Binomial name
- Mecocerculus minor (Taczanowski, 1879)

= Sulphur-bellied tyrannulet =

Species of bird

The sulphur-bellied tyrannulet (Mecocerculus minor) is a species of bird in subfamily Elaeniinae of family Tyrannidae, the tyrant flycatchers. It is found in Colombia, Ecuador, Peru, and Venezuela.

== Taxonomy and systematics ==
The sulphur-bellied tyrannulet is monotypic.

== Description ==
The sulphur-bellied tyrannulet is 11 to 12 cm (4.3 to 4.7 in) long and weighs about 11 g (0.39 oz). The sexes have the same plumage. Adults have a medium gray crown. They have a thin white supercilium and a blackish stripe through the eye on an otherwise grayish white face. Their upperparts are dark olive. Their wings are dark dusky with wide buff edges on the flight feathers. Their wing coverts have wide buffy tips that show as two bars on the closed wing. Their tail is dusky olive with buffy-tinged edges on the feathers. Their upper throat is white, their lower throat and breast deep yellow with a darker olive wash, and their belly and undertail coverts unmarked bright yellow. Both sexes have a brown iris, a thin, pointed, black bill with a pale base to the mandible, and medium gray legs and feet.

== Distribution and habitat ==
The sulphur-bellied tyrannulet is found primarily on the east slope of the Andes from central Colombia through Ecuador and into Peru as far as Huánuco Department, though it is patchily distributed along the chain. There are also a few scattered records in western Venezuela's Táchira state and on the west side of the Andes in northern Ecuador. It inhabits humid montane forest in the subtropical and temperate zones. It favors secondary forest, forest edges, patchy cloudforest, and clearings with scattered trees rather than unbroken mature forest.

== Behavior ==
=== Movement ===
The sulphur-bellied tyrannulet is a year-round resident throughout its range.

=== Feeding ===
The sulphur-bellied tyrannulet feeds mostly on insects and also includes small fruits in its diet. It usually forages singly or in pairs and often joins mixed-species feeding flocks. It forages mostly at the outer edges of trees, though it also forages lower at forest edges. It takes most of its food by gleaning from leaves and twigs while perched and also makes short upward flights to briefly hover.

=== Breeding ===
Juvenile sulphur-bellied tyrannulets have been seen in July in Ecuador and between August and November in Peru. Nothing else is known about the species' breeding biology.

=== Vocalization ===
The sulphur-breasted tyrannulet's calls include "a sharp and fast 'chew-chew-chew' " that sometimes continues with more notes and "a squeakier, more nasal 'skwi-skwe-skwu-skwu' ".

== Status ==
The IUCN has assessed the sulphur-bellied tyrannulet as being of Least Concern. It has a large range; its population size is not known and is believed to be increasing. No immediate threats have been identified. It is considered locally common in Colombia, uncommon to fairly common in Peru, and rare in Venezuela. It occurs in several protected areas along the Andes. It "[s]eems to favour edge habitats; may be expanding range and becoming more common as a consequence of forest clearance by humans".
