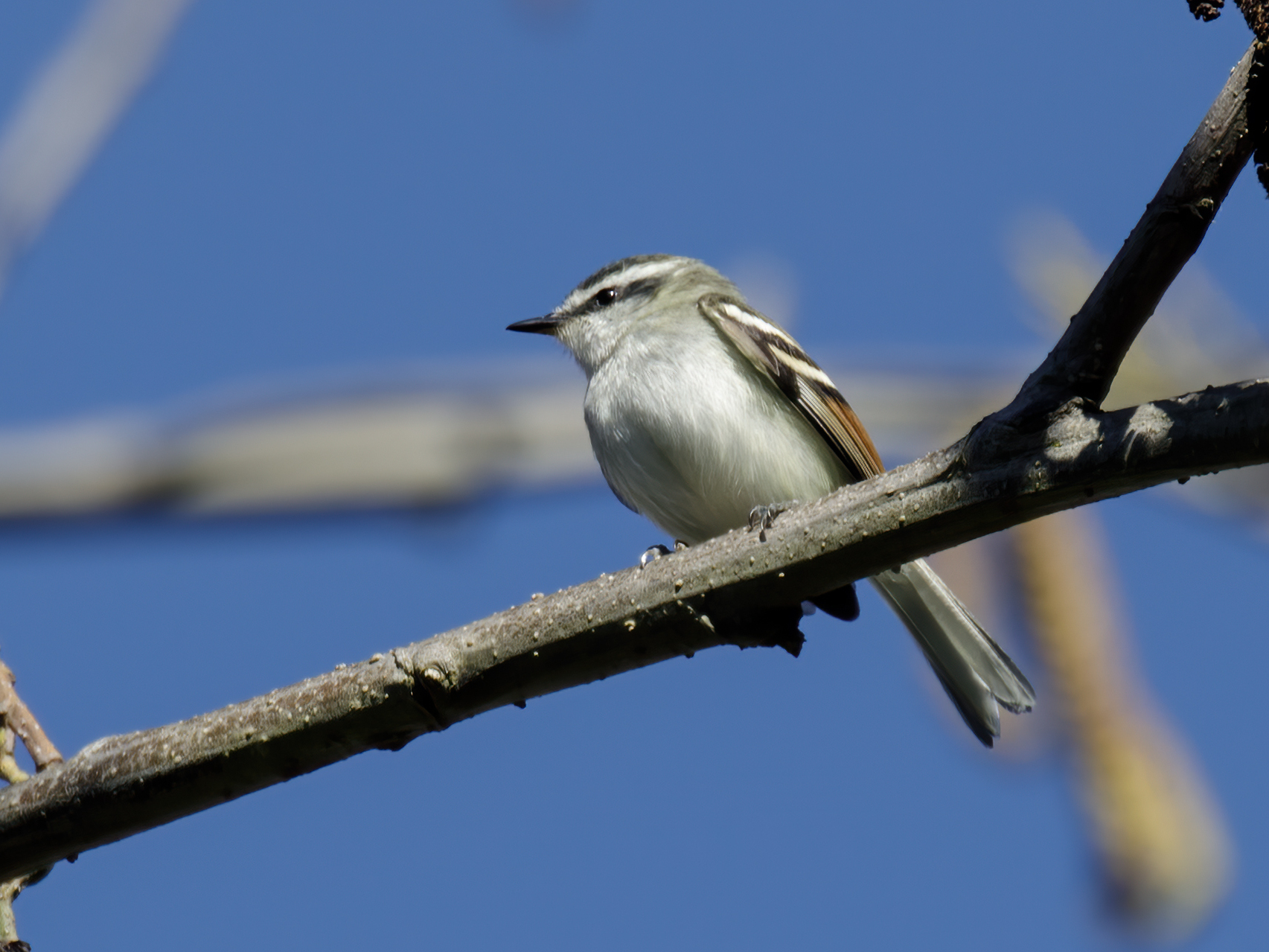

Conservation status
- Least Concern (IUCN 3.1)

Scientific classification
- Kingdom: Animalia
- Phylum: Chordata
- Class: Aves
- Order: Passeriformes
- Family: Tyrannidae
- Genus: Mecocerculus
- Species: M. calopterus

Binomial name
- Mecocerculus calopterus (Sclater, PL, 1859)

= Rufous-winged tyrannulet =

Species of bird

The rufous-winged tyrannulet (Mecocerculus calopterus) is a species of bird in subfamily Elaeniinae of family Tyrannidae, the tyrant flycatchers. It is found in Ecuador and Peru.

== Taxonomy and systematics ==
The rufous-winged tyrannulet is monotypic.

== Description ==
The rufous-winged tyrannulet is about 11 cm (4.3 in) long and weighs 10 to 11 g (0.35 to 0.39 oz). The sexes have the same plumage. Adults have a dark gray crown. They have a wide white supercilium, a wide black stripe through the eye, and a black crescent on the ear coverts on an otherwise whitish face. Their upperparts are bright greenish olive. Their wings are dark dusky with bright rufous edges on most of the flight feathers; the innermost and outermost pairs are yellow. Their wing coverts have white tips that show as two bars on the closed wing. Their tail is dusky olive with white on the outer two pairs of feathers. Their throat and breast are pale grayish white, their belly whitish, and their undertail coverts pale yellow. Both sexes have a brown iris, a long thin black bill, and gray legs and feet.

== Distribution and habitat ==
The rufous-winged tyrannulet is found in Ecuador on the western slope of the Andes from Imbabura Province south, on the eastern slope in Zamora-Chinchipe Province, and locally in the west-central coastal mountains. In Peru it is found to Lambayeque Department on the western slope, to San Martín Department on the eastern slope, and in the valley of the Marañón River. The species inhabits humid montane forest, dryer deciduous woodlands and forest, clearings with scattered trees, and plantations. In elevation it mostly occurs between 700 and 2,000 m (2,300 and 6,600 ft) in Ecuador, between 500 and 1,700 m (1,600 and 5,600 ft) on the western slope in Peru, and between 1,100 and 2,400 m (3,600 and 7,900 ft) on the eastern slope there.

== Behavior ==
=== Movement ===
The rufous-winged tyrannulet is believed to be a year-round resident throughout its range.

=== Feeding ===
The rufous-winged tyrannulet feeds mostly on insects. It usually forages singly or in pairs and often joins mixed-species feeding flocks. It forages mostly at the outer edges of trees in the forest canopy, though it also forages lower and sometimes out of the forest. It takes most of its food by gleaning from leaves and twigs while perched, though it occasionally makes short upward flights to briefly hover.

=== Breeding ===
Nothing is known about the rufous-winged tyrannulet's breeding biology.

=== Vocalization ===
The rufous-winged tyrannulet's call is "a slightly husky 'pur-cheé, chi-chichu' ". It also gives "a fast series of emphatic notes, mainly descending, 'kuw-ki-ke-ke-ku-ku' ".

== Status ==
The IUCN has assessed the rufous-winged tyrannulet as being of Least Concern. It has a large range; its population size is not known and is believed to be stable. No immediate threats have been identified. It is considered local throughout Ecuador and overall fairly common in Peru though more common on the western slope than the eastern. It occurs in many protected areas.
