= Andrew Whittaker (ornithologist) =

Andrew Whittaker (born 1960 in Leamington) was a British ornithologist, bioacustician and nature conservationist who mainly worked in Brazil.

== Life ==
Whittaker's fascination for bird world was triggered by his father at the age of seven, who himself was a passionate bird observer. In 1934 he accompanied the ornithologist Clive Minton to several excursions and learned bird ringing, whereby he obtained his first job in 1982 in Israel. This was followed by engagement in the Sandwich Bay observatory, in Borneo, in Long Point, Ontario and Fair Isle. In 1987 he went as a volunteer for a three-year joint project of the WWF with the Smithsonian Institution after Manaus in Brazil. In the second year he became project manager for rainforest birds. From 1993 he organized Victor Emanuel Nature Tours Bird observation tours for the US ecotourism. In 1995 he founded his own company Brazil Birding Tours. Subsequently, he traveled South America, Antarctica, Central America and Europe. His customers also included celebrities, including Prince Philip, Al Gore, Tom Hayden and journalist Tom Brokaw. In 2000 he stood by David Attenborough as a scientific consultant for the television series The Life of Birds. Over 900 hours of bird voices are archived in the British Library of Natural Sounds in London, recorded by Whittaker in Brazil. In 2008, the National Institute for Amazon Research published four of Whittaker's CDs entitled Voices of the Brazilian Amazon, followed by a second edition in 2012. In 2010, a DVD with chants, calls and photos of 1051 Brazilian bird species was published by Avis Brasilis. In 2001, Whittaker co-described the Chapada flycatcher Suiriri Islerorum (considered a junior synonym of Suiri Affinis, formerly described in 1856 by Karl Hermann Konrad Burmeister). In 1997, Whittaker discovered a new falcon species, the Cryptic Forest Falcon (Micrastur Mintoni ) which he described in 2003. In 2013, together with Steven Leon Hilty and David Ascanio, he wrote the first description of the newly discovered Delta Amacuro softtail (Thripophaga amacurensis ). In addition, Whittaker was able to document the occurrence of 19 bird species previously undetected in Brazil.

Furthermore, Whittaker rediscovered three bird species that were previously believed lost, including the Chestnut-headed nunlet ( Nonnula Amaurocephala) (no proof from 1936 to 1992), Pelzeln's tody-tyrant (Hemitriccus inornatus) (no evidence from 1831 to 1992), the White-tailed tityra (Tityra leucura) (no proof from 1829 to 2007). The latter was temporarily viewed as an almost fully grown abnormal hybrid between the Black-crowned tityra subspecies Tityra Inquisitor albitorques and Tityra inquisitor furelni, but was reconfirmed in 2024 by the International Ornithologists' Union as a distinct species.

== Taxa ==
In 2007, Whittaker discovered the Alta Floresta antpitta in the Tapajós National Forest, which from his colleagues Lincoln Silva Carneiro, Luiz Pedreira Gonzaga, Péricles S. Rêgo, Iracilda Sampaio, Horacio Schneider and Alexandre Aleixo was described in 2012 as Hylopezus Whittakeri.
