= Satish Nagarajaiah =

Indian-American distinguished professor

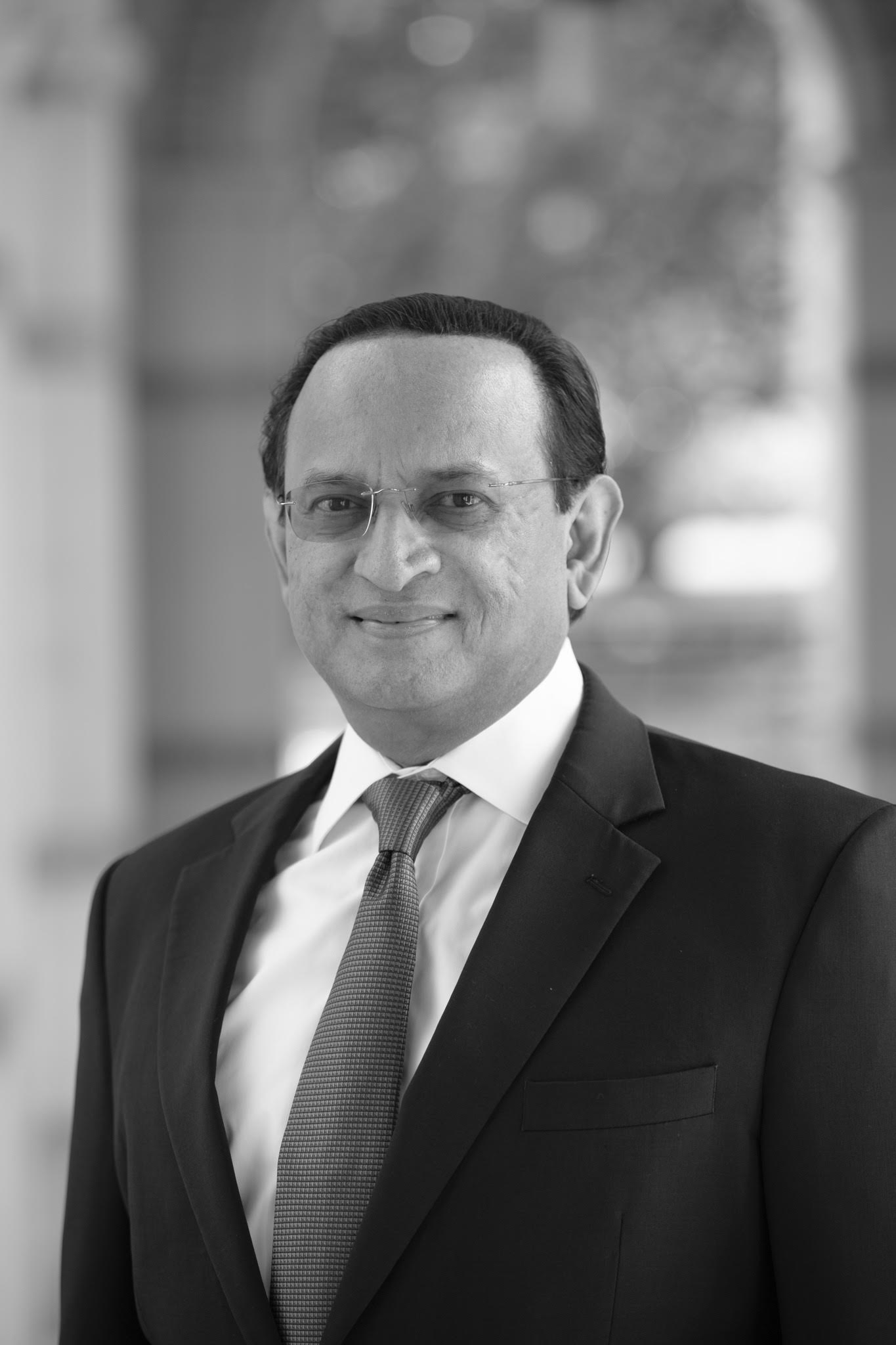
- Satish Nagarajaiah
- Citizenship: American
- Education: Ph.D.
- Alma mater: State University of New York at Buffalo; Indian Institute of Science; Bangalore University - Visvesvaraya College of Engineering
- Occupations: Professor, Engineer, Scientist
- Known for: Structural engineering, Structural dynamics, Seismic base isolation, Structural control and Monitoring, Sparse System Identification, Physics Informed Machine Learning/AI, and Sensing with Nanomaterials.
- Awards: George W. Housner Medal (2025); Nathan N. Newmark Medal (2020); Raymond C. Reese Research Prize (2017); Takuji Kobori Prize (2019); Leon S. Moisseiff Award (2015)
- Website: Official website

Satish Nagarajaiah is an Indian-American professor in the departments of civil and environmental engineering and of mechanical engineering at Rice University, where he holds a courtesy appointment in the department of Materials Science and Nano-Engineering. His fields of study are structural engineering, and engineering mechanics, specifically focused on structural dynamics, seismic base isolation, vibration isolation, adaptive negative stiffness structures, sensing, structural health monitoring, and system identification with machine learning.

== Education ==
Nagarajaiah received a bachelor's degree in structural engineering from Bangalore University in 1980 and completed his Master's in Civil Engineering from the Indian Institute of Science, Bangalore, in 1982. After completing his education in India, he worked as the lead structural engineer with Tata Consulting Engineers till 1986. He earned his Ph.D. (1987-1990) from The State University of New York at Buffalo, where he worked as a postdoctoral researcher till 1993, and then as an assistant professor at the University of Missouri in Columbia from the year 1993 to 1998. In 1999, he joined Rice University as an Associate Professor, and became a full professor in 2006.

== Career and Impact ==
Nagarajaiah began his professional career by analyzing and designing structures in thermal power plants while at Tata Consulting Engineers. He started his academic career focused on analytical modeling and algorithms in Structural dynamics, Seismic isolation, and earthquake engineering, and then expanded his studies into allied fields including Structural Control and Monitoring, Adaptive Structures, Sparse Structural System Identification, Physics Informed Machine Learning/AI, and Sensing with Nanomaterials.

During and after obtaining his Ph.D., he worked with UB researchers (Andrei M Reinhorn, Michael C. Constantinou, and other collaborators) and the Multidisciplinary Center for Earthquake Engineering Research (MCEER) on three different federal grants. He developed the 3D-BASIS suite of computer programs for the nonlinear dynamic analysis of seismically isolated buildings while conducting research at MCEER. These programs featured developments that Computers and Structures later adopted to develop the widely used programs, SAP2000 and ETABS.

Nagarajaiah was the primary developer of advanced nonlinear structural dynamic analysis algorithms and methods programed in 3D-BASIS that have been widely used to analyze and design structures, including the United States Court of Appeals for the Ninth Circuit, San Francisco International Airport and many others worldwide. 3D-BASIS has been cited in FEMA 356, NIST and NEHRP specifications.

Satish Nagarajaiah's career evolved from initial forward modeling (3D-BASIS) to inverse modeling (System Identification) while investigating the performance of large base-isolated buildings during the 1994 Northridge Earthquake from recorded input-output response. Since then, he has led the development of sparse structural system identification algorithms based on sparsity, time-frequency methods, wavelets, sparse regularization, statistical learning, filtering, low rank methods, data-driven modeling, physics-informed machine learning, and artificial intelligence. He has graduated and mentored numerous PhD students and post-doctoral researchers, many of whom serve as faculty at universities worldwide.

Nagarajaiah has invented numerous devices and systems to protect structures from damaging vibrations, including those caused by earthquakes. These include semiactive and smart systems with variable stiffness and adaptive passive versions of both tuned mass dampers and negative stiffness systems. He has also co-invented structural monitoring technologies that include strain-sensing nanomaterials and noncontact, laser-based smart strain-sensing skin. He holds four patents in the field of structural engineering, mechanical engineering and sensing. He cofounded a startup, Lumi-Strain, in 2024. S4 Lumi-Strain

Satish Nagarajaiah has served on the ASCE-Structural Engineering Institute Board of Governors from 2015 to 2019 and the Technical Activities Division Executive Committee for a decade before that. He was the founding chair of the ASCE-Engineering Mechanics Institute (EMI) structural health monitoring committee from 2004 to 2006. He also served as chair of the ASCE SEI structural control and sensing committee from 1998 to 2002. He served as the President of the USA-panel of the International Association of Structural Control and Monitoring.

== Publications and Editorial Activities ==
Nagarajaiah has also authored two books and has published nearly 350 journal and conference articles. He served as the managing editor of ASCE's Journal of Structural Engineering from 2011 to 2018. He is the editor of the Structural Control & Health Monitoring International Journal, published by Wiley, senior editor of Mechanical Systems and Signal Processing Journal, published by Elseiver, and editor-in-chief of the Structural Monitoring & Maintenance International Journal (North America edition), published by Techno-press.

=== Books ===
- Computational Methods, Seismic Protection, Hybrid Testing and Resilience in Earthquake Engineering. Springer Science+Business Media. 2014. ISBN 978-3319063935.
- Innovative Developments of Advanced Multifunctional Nanocomposites in Civil and Structural Engineering. Geotechnical, Geological and Earthquake Engineering. Vol. 33. Woodhead Publishing. 2016. doi:10.1007/978-3-319-06394-2. ISBN 978-1782423263.

== Honors and awards ==
Nagarajaiah has received the following honors and awards for his research contributions and practical impact.

- He was awarded the 2025 George W. Housner Medal for his outstanding contributions to structural control and monitoring by the ASCE-Engineering Mechanics Institute.
- In May 2021, Nagarajaiah was named a distinguished member of the American Society of Civil Engineers (ASCE), the highest honor bestowed by ASCE.
- He was awarded the 2020 Nathan N. Newmark Medal from the ASCE-Engineering Mechanics Institute and Structural Engineering Institute in March 2020, for his outstanding contributions in structural engineering and engineering mechanics.
- In November 2020, he with his coauthor, won the Takuji Kobori Prize from the International Association of Structural Control and Monitoring (IASCM) for 2019 based on their paper Bayesian structural identification of a hysteretic negative stiffness earthquake protection system using unscented Kalman filtering.
- He was elected to the National Academy of Inventors in December 2019 for impact of his patented inventions.
- He received the 2017 Raymond C. Reese Research Prize from the Engineering Institute of the American Society of Civil Engineers (ASCE) in February 2017 for Sparse System Identification.
- In 2016, he was ranked among the top 25 most cited researchers in civil engineering in Elsevier and Shanghai's Global Ranking of Academics.
- In January 2015, Satish Nagarajaiah was honored with the Leon S. Moisseiff Award for 2015 by the American Society of Civil Engineers (ASCE) for his research in the field of Structural design.
- In 2012, the Structural Engineering Institute (SEI) of ASCE named him an inaugural fellow of SEI.
- He was honored with a National Science Foundation's Early CAREER award for innovative research in Adaptive and Variable Stiffness Structures in 1999.
