= Andrew Whittaker =

Andrew Whittaker may refer to:

- Jack Whittaker (lottery winner) (Andrew Jackson Whittaker, Jr., born 1947), won a 2002 lottery jackpot
- Andrew Whittaker (engineer) (born 1956), American structural engineer
- Andrew Whittaker (ornithologist) (born 1960)
