= Sensuality =

Sensuality, sensual, sensualist or sensuous may refer to:

== Biology and behaviour ==
- Sense, a biological system used by an organism for sensation
- Sensualism, a doctrine in epistemology
- Sensation play, a group of sensual acts where senses are engaged to heighten erotic pleasure

== Music ==
- Sensuality (album), a 2007 album by German eurodance/trance project S.E.X. Appeal
- Sensuality – The Remix Album, a 2008 remix album by the above artist
- "Sensualité", a 1993 single by Belgian singer-songwriter Axelle Red
- Sensuous, a 2006 experimental pop album by Cornelius
- Sensual Sensual, a 1998 dance album by B-Tribe
- Sensuality (song), a 1998 R&B song by British group Lovestation

== Other uses ==
- Sensuality (film), a 1951 Mexican crime drama film
- The Sensualist, a 1991 Japanese animated historical drama film
- The Sensualist (novella), a novella by the Anglo-Indian author Ruskin Bond

== See also ==
- Sensualidad (disambiguation)
- Sense (disambiguation)
- Sensory (disambiguation)
