= Daniel J. Blumenthal =

- Occupations: Electrical engineer, academic, author

Academic background
- Education: University of Rochester; Columbia University; University of Colorado Boulder

Academic work
- Institutions: University of California, Santa Barbara (UCSB)

Daniel J. Blumenthal is an electrical engineer, academic, and author. He is a distinguished professor at the University of California, Santa Barbara (UCSB).

Blumenthal's research has focused on photonic integration for neutral atoms and trapped ion quantum sensing and computing, integration for optical communications, ultra-low loss silicon nitride waveguides, ultra-low linewidth integrated lasers, and photonic integrated circuits. He is a fellow of the Institute of Electrical and Electronics Engineers (IEEE), the Optica Society, and the National Academy of Inventors (NAI).

== Education ==
Blumenthal earned a B.S. in Electrical Engineering from the University of Rochester in 1981. He received an M.S. in Electrical Engineering from Columbia University in 1988 and a Ph.D. in Electrical Engineering from the University of Colorado Boulder in 1993.

== Career ==
Blumenthal began his professional career as an engineer at StorageTek from 1981 to 1984, followed by a role as a senior engineer at Sievers Research from 1984 to 1985. Later, he began working as a research engineer at Columbia University, where he remained until 1988, and subsequently at the University of Pennsylvania until 1990.

Blumenthal began his academic career at the Georgia Institute of Technology and worked as an assistant professor from 1993 to 1997. He then joined UCSB as an associate professor from 1997 to 2000, before being appointed professor in 2000. He also worked there as associate director of the Multidisciplinary Optical Switching Technology (MOST) Center. He was later named distinguished professor, a position he continues to hold. He is also the head of the Optical Communications and Atomic Quantum Photonic Integration Group (OCAQpi).

Blumenthal held the appointment of chief technology officer (CTO) at Packet Photonics and was president of SiNoptiq. He has been a guest editor of the IEEE Journal of Selected Topics in Quantum Electronics and the IEEE Journal on Selected Areas in Communications.

== Research ==
Blumenthal's research has focused on integrated photonics, the integration of light-matter quantum sensing and computing systems, ultra-low-noise microwave generation, and fiber-optic communications and sensing. He has conducted research on transferring table-scale optical quantum systems onto chip-scale platforms. Some of his research examined silicon nitride (SiN) photonics, demonstrating ultralow propagation losses in silicon nitride waveguides. Other research topics have included optical communications and high-speed networking, photonic switching systems with optical amplification, optical-label switching, and wavelength conversion. He has also worked on integrated photonic platforms, including ultra-low-loss waveguides, narrow-linewidth lasers, and explored silicon nitride photonic integrated circuits (PICs) for applications including communications, beam steering, signal processing, sensing, as well as optical gyroscopes.

Blumenthal's studies have examined optical packet switching for all-optical forwarding of ultra-high bit-rate data packets and optical-label switching for routing IP traffic without payload detection.

== Awards and honors ==
- 1999 – Presidential Early Career Award for Scientists and Engineers (PECASE), White House / United States Department of Defense
- 2003 – Fellow, IEEE
- 2006 – Fellow, Optical Society
- 2017 – Fellow, National Academy of Inventors
- 2020 – C. E. K. Mees Medal, Optical Society
- NSF Young Investigator Award – U.S. National Science Foundation

== Bibliography ==
=== Book ===
- Buus, Jens; Amann, Markus-Christian; Blumenthal, Daniel J. (2005). Tunable Laser Diodes and Related Optical Sources (Second ed.). Wiley-Inerscience, IEEE Press. ISBN 9780470546758.

=== Selected articles ===
- Blumenthal, D.J.; Olsson, B.-E.; Rossi, G.; Dimmick, T.E.; Rau, L.; Masanovic, M.; Lavrova, O.; Doshi, R.; Jerphagnon, O.; Bowers, J.E.; Kaman, V.; Coldren, L.A.; Barton, J. (2000). "All-Optical Label Swapping Networks and Technologies". Journal of Lightwave Technology. 18 (12): 2058–2075. Bibcode:2000JLwT...18.2058B. doi:10.1109/50.908817.
- Bauters, Jared F.; Heck, Martijn J. R.; John, Demis; Dai, Daoxin; Tien, Ming-Chun; Barton, Jonathon S.; Leinse, Arne; Heideman, René G.; Blumenthal, Daniel J.; Bowers, John E. (2011). "Ultra-Low-Loss High-Aspect-Ratio Si3N4 Waveguides". Optics Express. 19 (4): 3163–3174. Bibcode:2011OExpr..19.3163B. doi:10.1364/OE.19.003163. PMID 21369138.
- Blumenthal, Daniel J.; Heideman, Rene; Geuzebroek, Douwe; Leinse, Arne; Roeloffzen, Chris (2018). "Silicon Nitride in Silicon Photonics". Proceedings of the IEEE. 106 (12): 2209–2231. doi:10.1109/JPROC.2018.2861576.
- Gundavarapu, Sarat; Brodnik, Grant M.; Puckett, Matthew; Huffman, Taran; Bose, Debapam; Behunin, Ryan; Wu, Jianfeng; Qiu, Tiequn; Pinho, Cátia; Chauhan, Nitesh; Nohava, Jim; Rakich, Peter T.; Nelson, Karl D.; Salit, Mary; Blumenthal, Daniel J. (2019). "Sub-hertz Fundamental Linewidth Photonic Integrated Brillouin Laser". Nature Photonics. 13 (1): 60–67. arXiv:1709.04512. Bibcode:2019NaPho..13...60G. doi:10.1038/s41566-018-0313-2.
- Moody, Galan; Sorger, Volker J; Blumenthal, Daniel J; Juodawlkis, Paul W; et al. (2022). "2022 Roadmap on Integrated Quantum Photonics". Journal of Physics: Photonics. 4 (1): 012501. arXiv:2102.03323. Bibcode:2022JPhP....4a2501M. doi:10.1088/2515-7647/ac1ef4.
