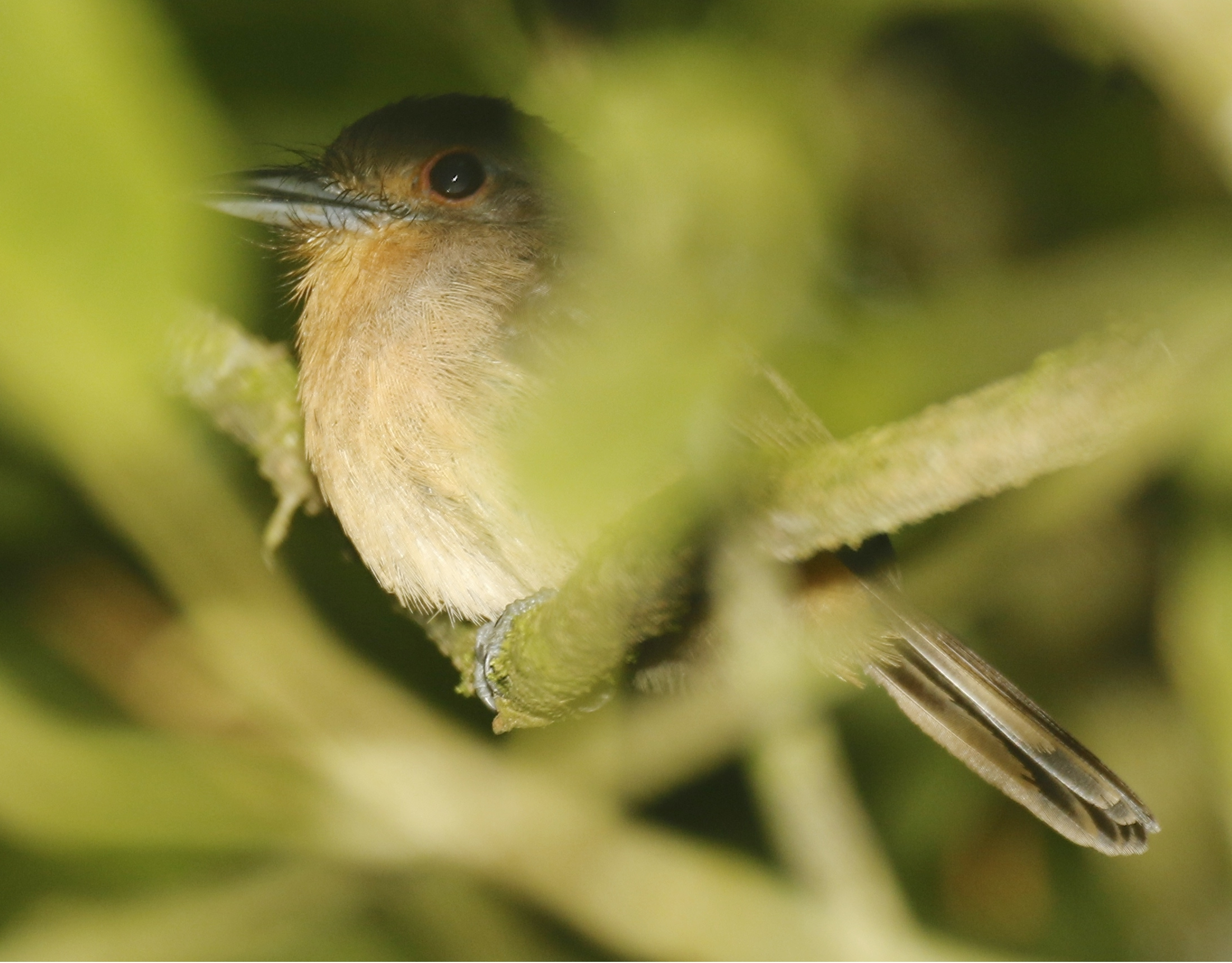

Conservation status
- Least Concern (IUCN 3.1)

Scientific classification
- Kingdom: Animalia
- Phylum: Chordata
- Class: Aves
- Order: Piciformes
- Genus: Nonnula
- Species: N. brunnea

Binomial name
- Nonnula brunnea Sclater, PL, 1881

= Brown nunlet =

Species of bird

The brown nunlet (Nonnula brunnea) is a species of bird in the family Bucconidae, the puffbirds, nunlets, and nunbirds. It is found in Colombia, Ecuador, and Peru.

== Taxonomy and systematics ==
The brown nunlet is monotypic. Its relationship to others of its genus has not been detailed but it is believed to be most closely related to the rusty-breasted nunlet (N. rubecula) and fulvous-chinned nunlet (N. sclateri) and may form a superspecies with them. It has sometimes been considered conspecific with the latter, and alternatively as conspecific with grey-cheeked nunlet (N. frontalis) and rufous-capped nunlet (N. ruficapilla).

== Description ==
The brown nunlet is 14 to 15 cm (5.5 to 5.9 in) long. Its crown and upperparts are plain brown. It has a buffy rufous band from the bill to the eye, a narrow buffy ring around the eye, and dark grayish brown cheeks. The throat and flanks are dark rufous, and the chin and breast pale rufous. The belly is buffy rufous. The bill, eye, and feet are dark.

== Distribution and habitat ==
The brown nunlet is found from south-central Colombia through eastern Ecuador into northern Peru. It inhabits humid lowland terra firme forest and dense secondary forest. It tends to remain below the canopy. In Ecuador it mostly occurs below 400 m (1,300 ft) of elevation but has been recorded as high as 700 m (2,300 ft).

== Behavior ==
=== Feeding ===
Almost nothing is known about the brown nunlet's feeding behavior or diet. It has been observed joining flocks of Myrmotherula antwrens.

=== Breeding ===
One nest of the brown nunlet was a trench excavated in the ground and roofed with sticks and leaves. Its close relative the rusty-breasted nunlet also nests in a shallow scrape that it covers with twigs and leaves. That species' clutch size is usually four eggs.

=== Vocalization ===
The brown nunlet's song is "a series of 20–25 'treeu' notes, repeated steadily, starting quietly, building up, and then fading again towards end."

== Status ==
The IUCN has assessed the brown nunlet as being of Least Concern, though its population is unknown and believed to be decreasing. It appears to be rare to uncommon across its range.
