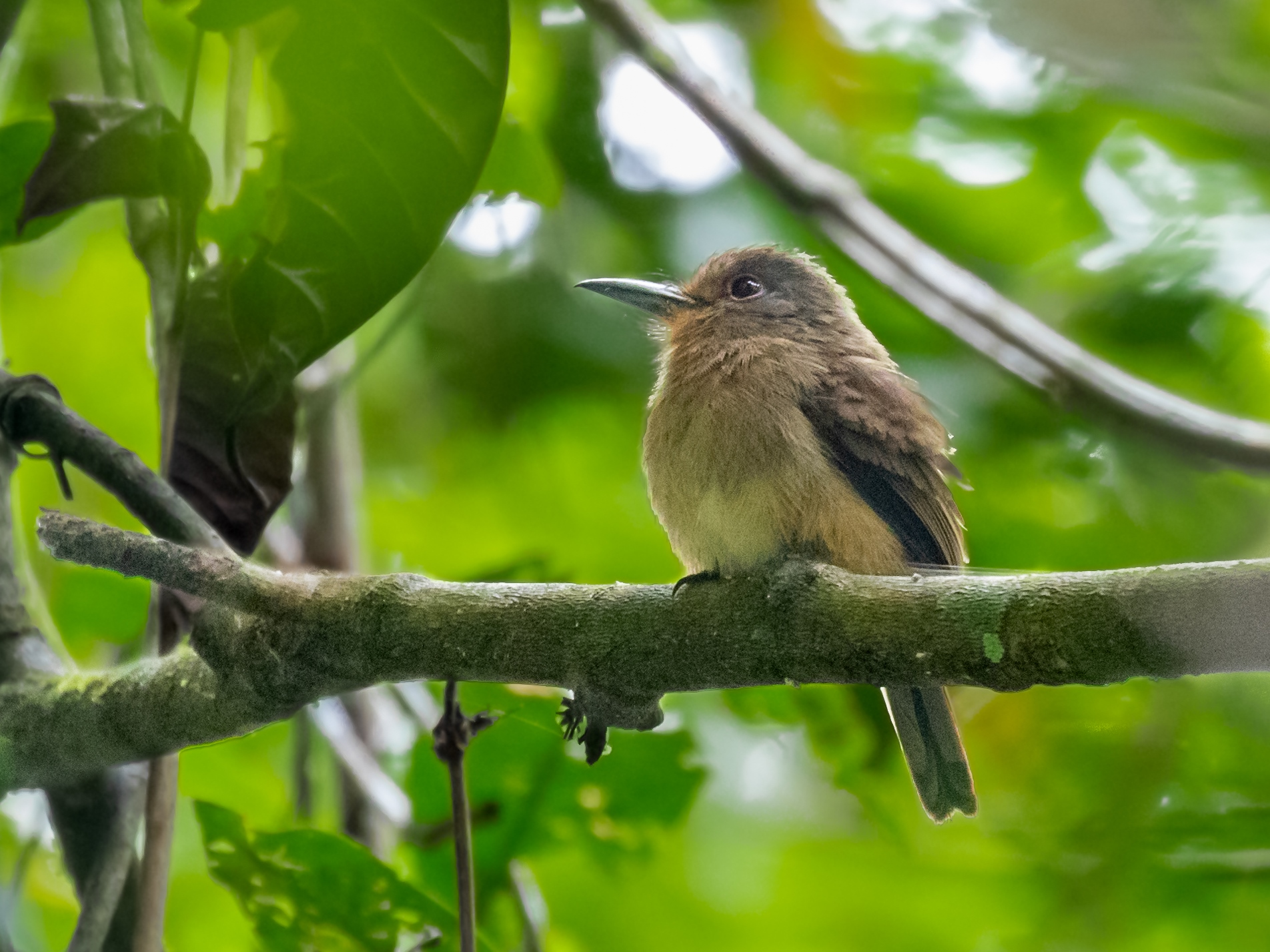

Conservation status
- Least Concern (IUCN 3.1)

Scientific classification
- Kingdom: Animalia
- Phylum: Chordata
- Class: Aves
- Order: Piciformes
- Genus: Nonnula
- Species: N. sclateri

Binomial name
- Nonnula sclateri Hellmayr, 1907

= Fulvous-chinned nunlet =

Species of bird

The fulvous-chinned nunlet (Nonnula sclateri) is a species of bird in the family Bucconidae, the puffbirds, nunlets, and nunbirds. It is found in Bolivia, Brazil, and Peru.

== Taxonomy and systematics ==
The fulvous-chinned nunlet is monotypic. Its relationship to others of its genus has not been detailed but it is believed to be most closely related to the rusty-breasted nunlet (N. rubecula) and brown nunlet (N. brunnea). It has sometimes been considered conspecific with the latter.

== Description ==
The fulvous-chinned nunlet is 14 to 15.5 cm (5.5 to 6.1 in) long. Two males weighed 15.4 and 17 g (0.54 and 0.60 oz) and two females 19 and 19.9 g (0.67 and 0.70 oz). Its upperparts, wings, and tail are dull brown. Its lores are reddish brown and the cheeks dark gray. The chin is pale rufous ("fulvous") that blends to reddish brown on the throat and breast. The center of the belly is whitish and the flanks dull fulvous. The eye is brown with a narrow coral red or reddish purple ring around it. The maxilla is black, the mandible dark gray to greenish gray, and the feet gray to olive gray.

== Distribution and habitat ==
The fulvous-chinned nunlet is found in southwestern Amazonia south of the Amazon River, from eastern Peru and northern Bolivia east in southwestern Brazil as far as the Madeira River. It is entirely a bird of humid lowland forest, seldom being found above 300 m (980 ft) of elevation. It primarily inhabits the understory of upland terra firme forest but has also been reported at the edges of seasonally flooded várzea forest.

== Behavior ==
=== Feeding ===
The fulvous-chinned nunlet's feeding behavior has not been documented. It is known to hunt from a perch up to about 6 m (20 ft) above the ground, and is assumed to sally out to capture prey. Its diet is also not known, "but almost surely this species primarily consumes large arthropods, perhaps supplemented by very small vertebrates."

=== Breeding ===
Little is known about the fulvous-chinned nunlet's breeding phenology. It is assumed to nest in a burrow in the ground. However, its close relative the rusty-breasted nunlet nests in a shallow scrape on sloping ground that it roofs with twigs and leaves. That species' clutch size is usually four eggs.

=== Vocalization ===
The fulvous-chinned nunlet's song is a "weak series of thin, mewing whistles: wee weep weep weep weep weep".

== Status ==
The IUCN has assessed the fulvous-chinned nunlet as being of Least Concern, though its population is unknown and believed to be decreasing. It is rare over its large range, making its numbers difficult to measure. Though no specific threats have been identified, "[a]s is the case with all species of Amazonian forest birds, Fulvous-chinned Nunlet is vulnerable to habitat loss or degradation from a wide range of human activities."
