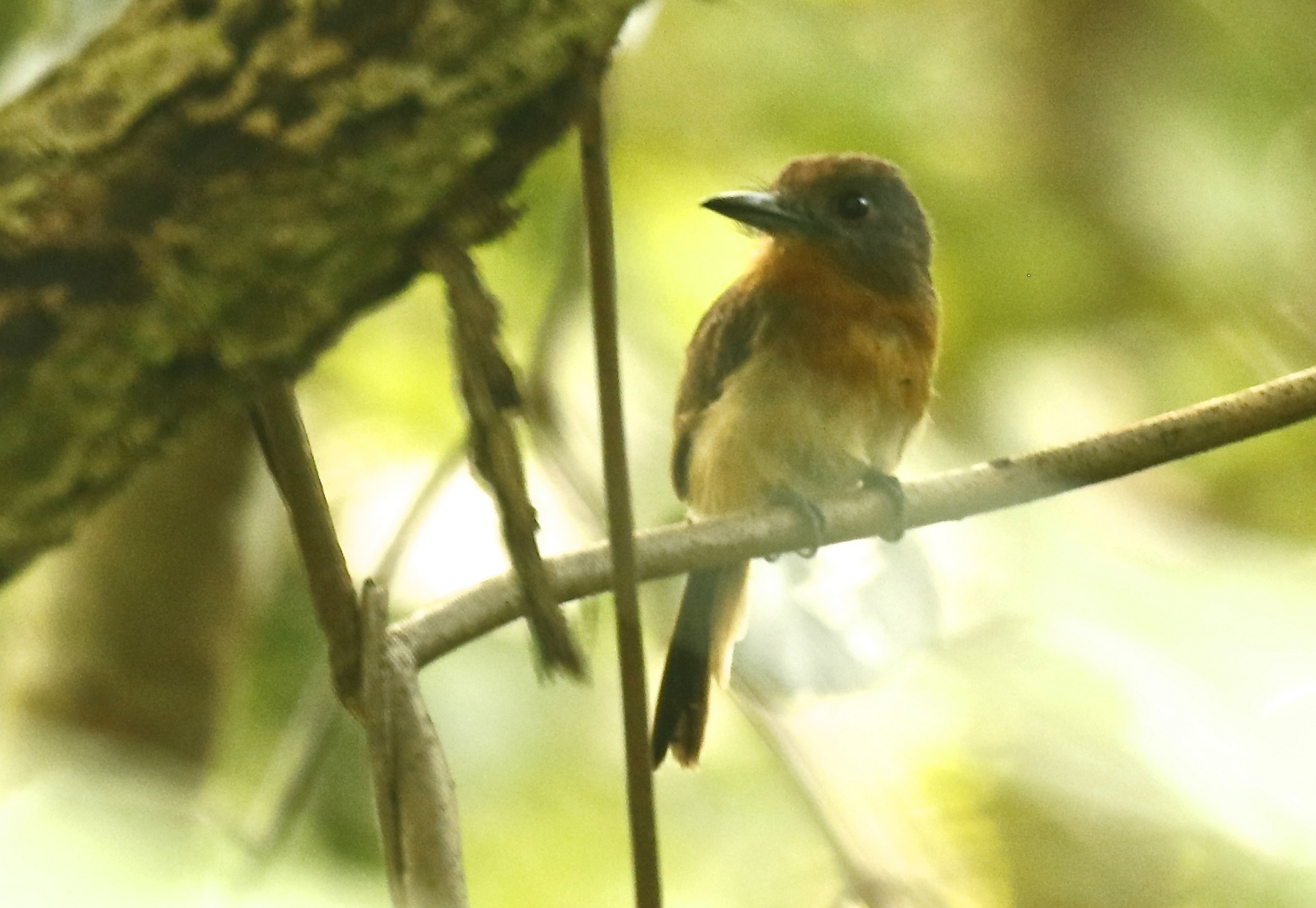
- Alginate area - Darien, Panama

Conservation status
- Least Concern (IUCN 3.1)

Scientific classification
- Kingdom: Animalia
- Phylum: Chordata
- Class: Aves
- Order: Piciformes
- Genus: Nonnula
- Species: N. frontalis

Binomial name
- Nonnula frontalis (Sclater, PL, 1854)

= Grey-cheeked nunlet =

Species of bird

The grey-cheeked nunlet (Nonnula frontalis) is a species of bird in the family Bucconidae, the puffbirds, nunlets, and nunbirds. It is found in Colombia and Panama.

== Taxonomy and systematics ==
The grey-cheeked nunlet was first described by P.L. Sclater in 1854 in Colombia. Three subspecies are generally recognized, the nominate N. f. frontalis, N. f. stulta, and N. f. pallescens. The nominate has been suggested to constitute more than one taxon based on differences in coloration observed in specimens. N. f. pallescens has occasionally been suggested to be a subspecies of the rufous-capped nunlet (N. ruficapilla) of southern Amazonia. The grey-cheeked nunlet forms a superspecies with the rufous-capped nunlet and the chestnut-headed nunlet (N. amaurocephala), which is restricted to a small area in northwest Brazil. It has been suggested to be conspecific with the rufous-capped nunlet and also with the brown nunlet (N. brunnea).

== Description ==
The grey-cheeked nunlet is 14 to 15 cm (5.5 to 5.9 in) long and weighs 14.5 to 19.5 g (0.51 to 0.69 oz). The nominate subspecies has a very dark chestnut crown and plain brown upperparts, lighter on the rump. Most of the face is gray with a ring of bare red skin around the dark brown eye. The tail is dark brown and almost black near the tip. The chin, throat, breast, and flanks are rufous and the belly is buffy. The bill is mostly blue-gray and the feet dull brown or greenish gray. N. f. stulta has a very dark crown and its tail is blacker and rump drabber than those of the nominate. N. f. pallescens has much paler upperparts than the nominate and its throat and breast are buff.

== Distribution and habitat ==
The grey-cheeked nunlet has a somewhat restricted range that extends from central Panama to north-central Colombia. N. f. stulta is the northernmost subspecies; it is found from central Panama into extreme northwestern Colombia. N. f. pallescens is found in the Caribbean lowlands of northern Colombia. The nominate subspecies is found in the interior of northern Colombia. The species inhabits a variety of landscapes including moist to humid primary and secondary forest, gallery forest, and thickets; it especially favors woodlands along rivers. it usually inhabits the lower levels of the forest but can be found up to the subcanopy. In elevation it ranges from sea level to 1,000 m (3,300 ft).

== Behavior ==
=== Feeding ===
The grey-cheeked nunlet's feeding behavior has not been documented, though it has been observed taking a variety of arthropod prey. It sometimes joins mixed-species foraging flocks.

=== Breeding ===
The grey-cheeked nunlet breeds from February to June in Colombia but little else is known about its breeding phenology. The nesting behavior of the entire genus Nonnula is poorly understood, but the rusty-breasted nunlet (N. rubecula) nests in a shallow scrape that it covers with twigs and leaves. That species' clutch size is usually four eggs.

=== Vocalization ===
The grey-cheeked nunlet's song is a "plaintive, measured series of up to 20 notes, 'weeip weeip, weeip...'."

== Status ==
The IUCN has assessed the grey-cheeked nunlet as being of Least Concern, though its population is estimated to be fewer than 50,000 mature individuals and decreasing. The species is considered uncommon to rare in Panama and generally fairly common in Colombia.
