= Sensualidad =

Sensualidad may refer to:

- Sensualidad (film), a 1951 Mexican drama film
- "Sensualidad" (song), a 2017 song by Bad Bunny, Prince Royce, and J Balvin

== See also ==
- Sensuality (disambiguation)
