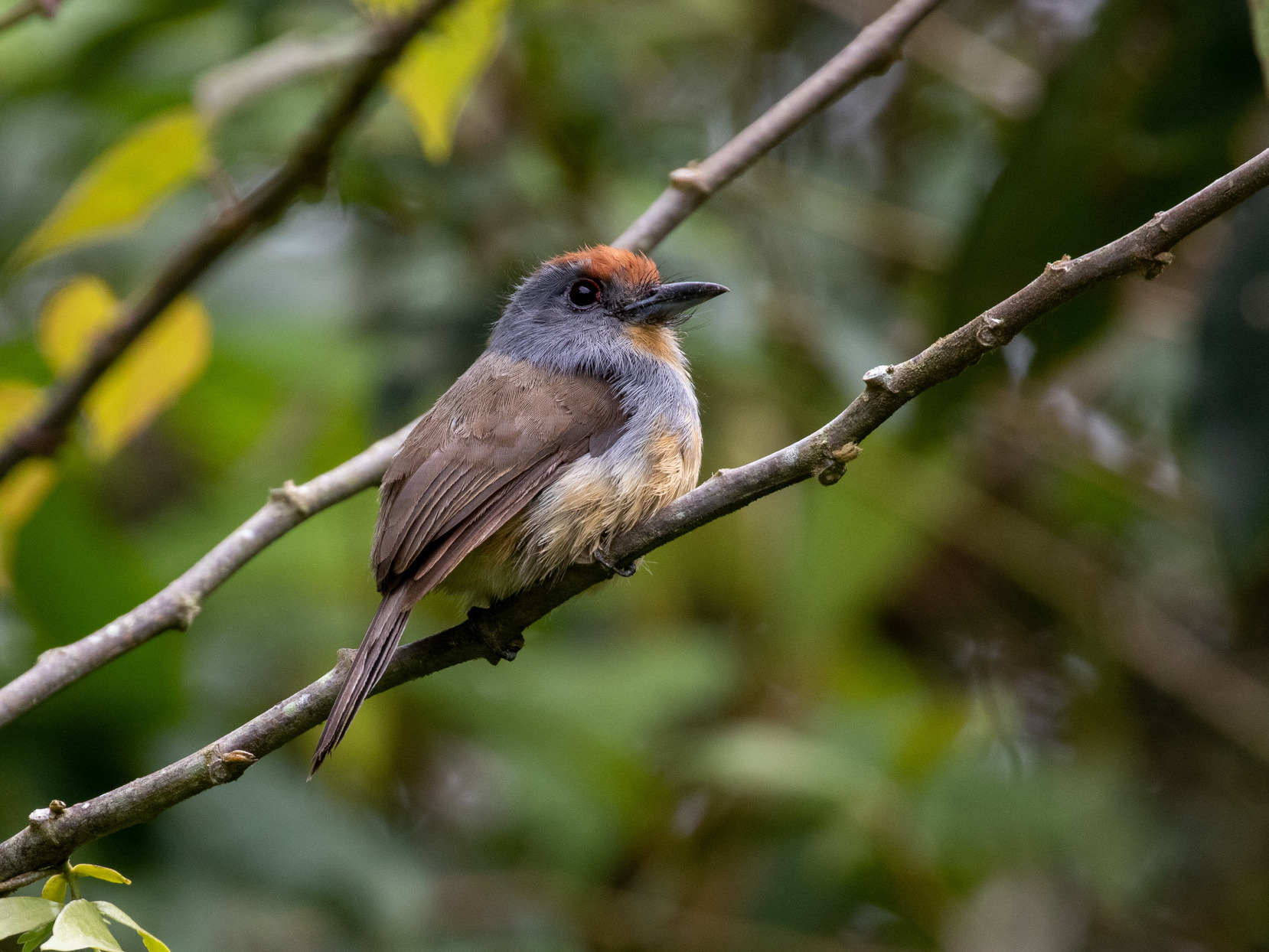

Conservation status
- Least Concern (IUCN 3.1)

Scientific classification
- Kingdom: Animalia
- Phylum: Chordata
- Class: Aves
- Order: Piciformes
- Genus: Nonnula
- Species: N. ruficapilla

Binomial name
- Nonnula ruficapilla (Tschudi, 1844)

= Rufous-capped nunlet =

Species of bird

The rufous-capped nunlet (Nonnula ruficapilla) is a species of bird in the family Bucconidae, the puffbirds, nunlets, and nunbirds. It is found in Bolivia, Brazil, and Peru.

== Taxonomy and systematics ==
These four subspecies of rufous-capped nunlet are generally recognized:

- N. r. rufipectus Chapman (1928)
- N. r. ruficapilla Tschudi (1844)
- N. r. inundata Novaes (1991)
- N. r. nattereri Hellmayr (1921)

The grey-cheeked nunlet (N. frontalis) and brown nunlet (N. brunnea) have sometimes been suggested to be conspecific with the rufous-capped nunlet. Alternatively, one subspecies grey-capped nunlet, N. f. pallescens, has been suggested to instead be a subspecies of rufous-capped nunlet. The rufous-capped, grey-cheeked, and chestnut-headed (N. amaurocephala) nunlets form a superspecies.

== Description ==
The rufous-capped nunlet is about 14 cm (5.5 in) long and weighs 14 to 22 g (0.49 to 0.78 oz). The nominate subspecies has a large rich chestnut crown. The rest of the face, its nape, and the sides of the breast are cold gray. The rest of the upperparts are plain dull brown with some reddish highlights. The chin and breast are reddish orange, the flanks a paler rufous, and the central underparts whitish. The bill is mostly silvery blue, the eye brown with a bare reddish ring around it, and the feet dark brownish gray. N. r. rufipectus has a darker cap and brighter breast than the nominate, N. r. nattereri a darker cap and duller breast, and N. r. inundata is darker and duller than nattereri.

== Distribution and habitat ==
The subspecies of rufous-capped nunlet are distributed thus:

- N. r. rufipectus, northeastern Peru
- N. r. ruficapilla, eastern Peru and western Brazil south of the Amazon River
- N. r. inundata, along the Tocantins River in eastern Pará, Brazil
- N. r. nattereri, northern Bolivia and Brazil's Mato Grosso and western Pará states

The species inhabits the undergrowth and subcanopy of a variety of landscapes, including terra firme, secondary, and transitional forest; forest along rivers and streams, and igapó. It most often associates with bamboo, especially thickets along river edges, but not exclusively. In hilly forested country it is often found along streams.

== Behavior ==
=== Feeding ===
Specimens of rufous-capped nunlet had insect remains in their stomachs. No other information about its diet or feeding behavior has been published.

=== Breeding ===
Nothing is known about the rufous-capped nunlet's breeding phenology.

=== Vocalization ===
The rufous-capped nunlet's song is a "long series (13–30 notes) of sharp, clear, short, upward-inflected whistles, 'fwick!-fwick!'...the series slightly softer and lower in pitch near beginning and end."

== Status ==
The IUCN has assessed the rufous-capped nunlet as being of Least Concern. Though it has a very large range, its population is unknown and believed to be decreasing. It is fairly common in Brazil, less so in Peru, and uncommon to rare in Bolivia.
