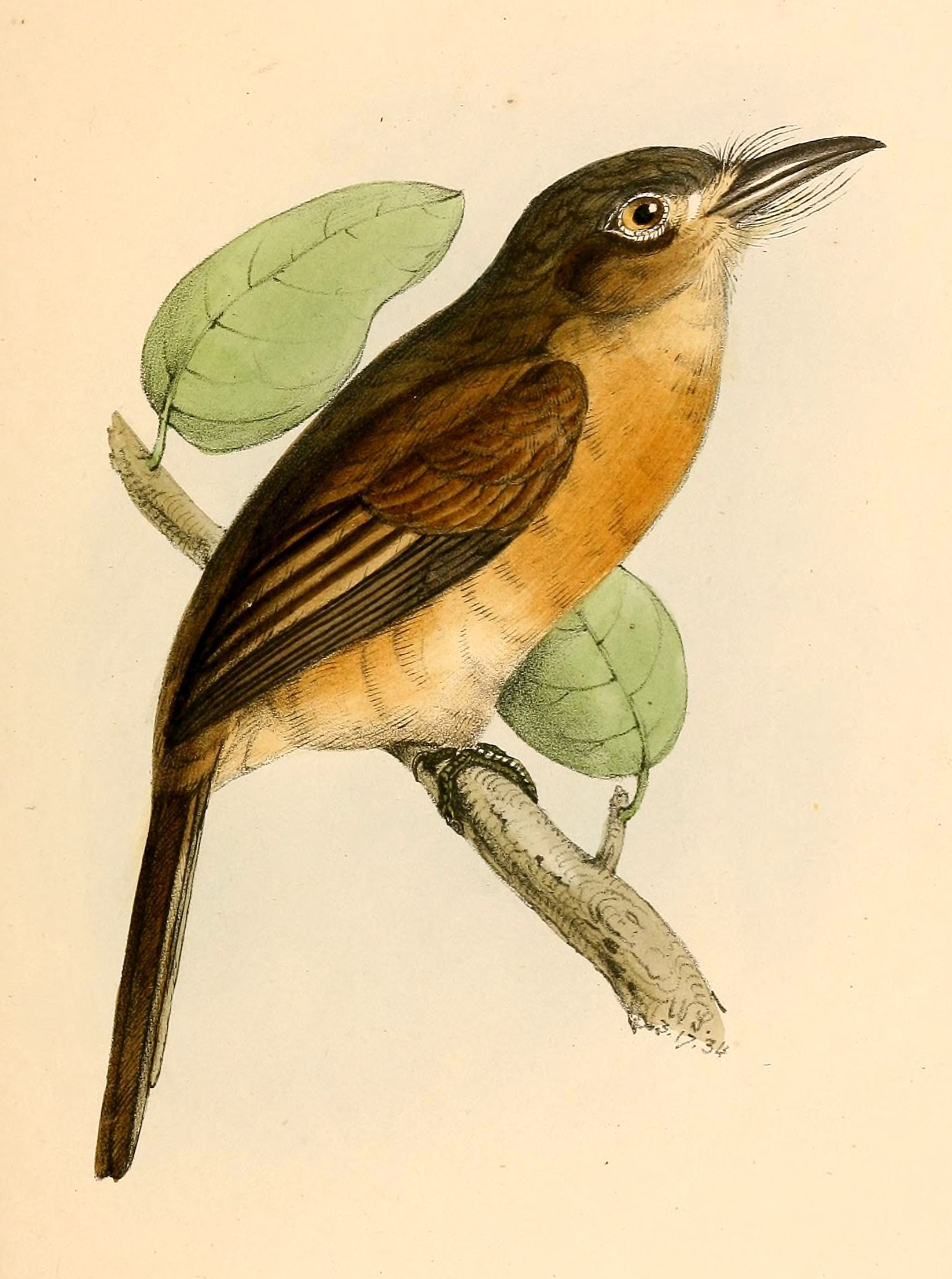
- Rusty-breasted nunlet (Nonnula rubecula)

Scientific classification
- Kingdom: Animalia
- Phylum: Chordata
- Class: Aves
- Order: Piciformes
- Suborder: Galbuli
- Genus: Nonnula; P.L. Sclater, 1854

Type species
- Bucco rubecula von Spix, 1824

Species
- See text

= Nonnula =

Genus of birds

Nonnula is a genus of puffbird in the Bucconidae family. They are commonly known as nunlets.

== Extant Species ==
It contains the following species:

Genus Nonnula – P.L. Sclater, 1854 – six species
Common name	Scientific name and subspecies	Range	Size and ecology	IUCN status and estimated population
Chestnut-headed nunlet	Nonnula amaurocephala Chapman, 1921	Brazil.	Size: Habitat: Diet:	LC
Brown nunlet	Nonnula brunnea Sclater, PL, 1881	Colombia, Ecuador, and Peru	Size: Habitat: Diet:	LC
Grey-cheeked nunlet	Nonnula frontalis (Sclater, PL, 1854) Two subspecies: N. f. frontalis; N. f. stulta	Colombia and Panama	Size: Habitat: Diet:	LC
Rusty-breasted nunlet	Nonnula rubecula (Spix, 1824) Seven subspecies: N. r. tapanahoniensis Mees (1968); N. r. duidae Chapman (1914); N. r. interfluvialis Parkes (1970); N. r. simulatrix Parkes (1970); N. r. cineracea Sclater, PL (1881); N. r. simplex Todd (1937); N. r. rubecula Spix (1824)	Argentina, Brazil, Colombia, Ecuador, French Guiana, Paraguay, Peru, Suriname, and Venezuela.	Size: Habitat: Diet:	LC
Rufous-capped nunlet	Nonnula ruficapilla (Tschudi, 1844) Four subspecies: N. r. rufipectus Chapman (1928); N. r. ruficapilla Tschudi (1844); N. r. inundata Novaes (1991); N. r. nattereri Hellmayr (1921)	Bolivia, Brazil, and Peru.	Size: Habitat: Diet:	LC
Fulvous-chinned nunlet	Nonnula sclateri Hellmayr, 1907	Bolivia, Brazil, and Peru	Size: Habitat: Diet:	LC
