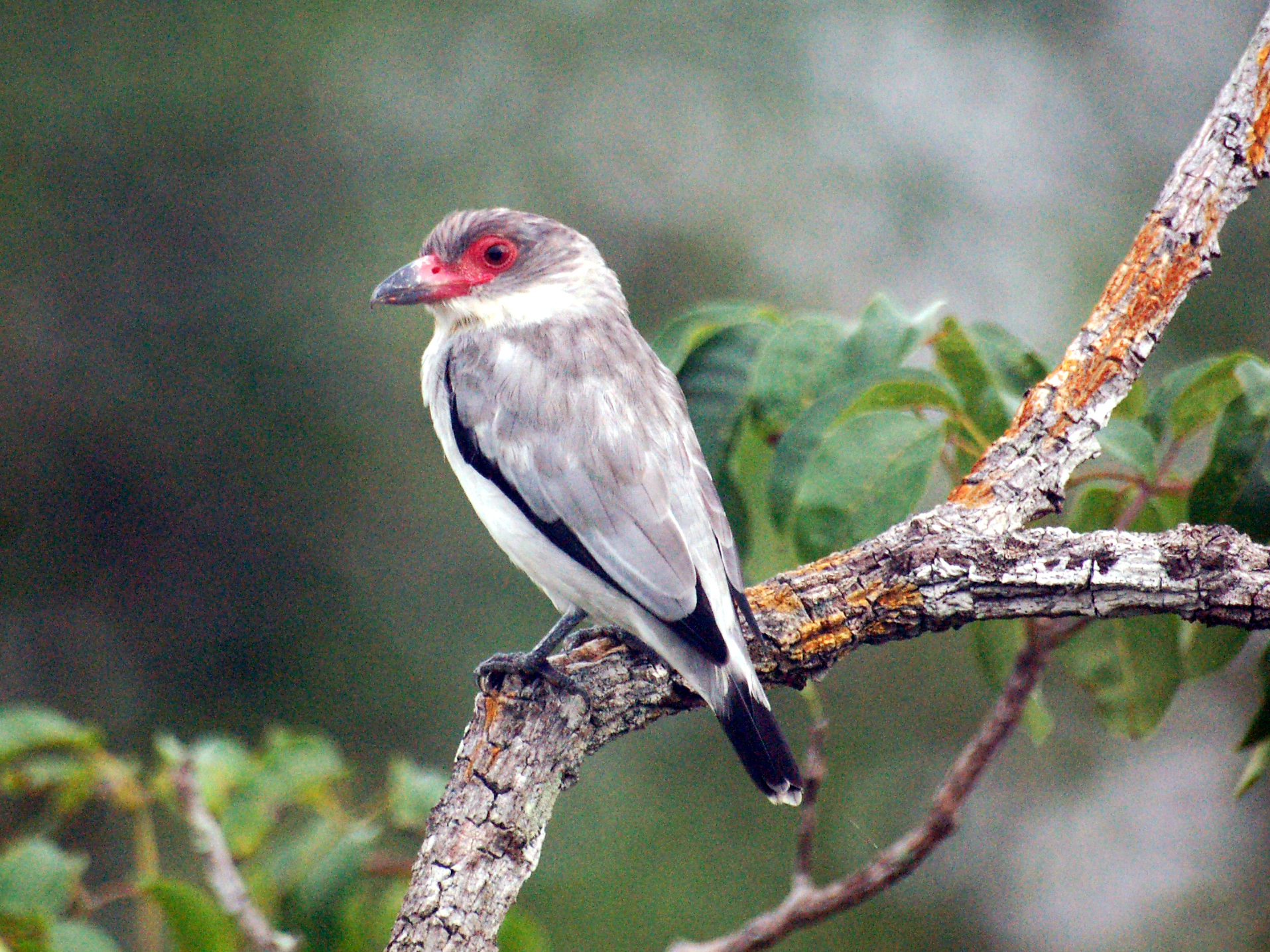
- Masked tityra (Tityra semifasciata)

Scientific classification
- Kingdom: Animalia
- Phylum: Chordata
- Class: Aves
- Order: Passeriformes
- Family: Tityridae
- Subfamily: Tityrinae
- Genus: Tityra; Vieillot, 1816

Type species
- Lanius cayanus Linnaeus, 1766

Species
- 3-4, see text

Synonyms
- Exetastes; Exetastus; Pachyrynchus; Psaris

= Tityra =

Genus of birds

The tityras are passerine birds in the genus Tityra in the family Tityridae. They are found from southern Mexico, through Central America, to northern and central South America, including Trinidad.

These are medium-sized birds, typically around 20–25 centimetres (7.9–9.8 in) long, with large bills. The adult males are greyish-white above and white below, except for the wings and tail which are at least partially black. The males of all three species also have black head markings. The females are similar, but are duller, with browner or greyer head markings and often streaked body plumage. The black-tailed and the masked tityra both have a conspicuous red eye-ring and base of the bill.

== Taxonomy ==
The genus Tityra was introduced by French ornithologist Louis Pierre Vieillot in 1816, with the black-tailed tityra named as the type species. The genus name comes from "Tityri" – the name given by the Ancient Greeks to the satyrs and other mythological companions of Pan and Bacchus. This is a reference to the boisterous, aggressive behaviour of the type species.

The tityras have traditionally been placed in either the family Cotingidae or the family Tyrannidae, but genetic evidence strongly suggests they are better placed with a few other related genera (notably the becards) in their own family Tityridae, where now placed by South American Classification Committee. The black-crowned tityra is sometimes placed in a separate genus, Erator.

The genus contains four species.

Image	Scientific name	Common name	Distribution
	Tityra cayana	Black-tailed tityra	Widespread east of the Andes from eastern Ecuador north to the Caribbean coast and south to southeastern Brazil.
	Tityra semifasciata	Masked tityra	Mexico, through Central America, to northwestern and central South America (as far south as Paraguay).
	Tityra inquisitor	Black-crowned tityra	Argentina, Belize, Bolivia, Brazil, Colombia, Costa Rica, Ecuador, French Guiana, Guatemala, Guyana, Honduras, Mexico, Nicaragua, Panama, Paraguay, Peru, Suriname, Trinidad and Tobago, and Venezuela.
	Tityra leucura	White-tailed tityra	Brazilian Amazon near the Madeira River.

The white-tailed tityra was formerly considered a subspecies of the black-crowned tityra, but recent evidence shows it is a valid species restricted to the Brazilian Amazon near the Madeira River; it was accepted as such by the IOC in 2024. It was only photographed for the first time in 2022.

Some authorities also split the black-tailed tityra into two species, western black-tailed tityra T. cayana in the northwestern half of the range, and eastern black-tailed tityra T. braziliensis in the southeastern half of the range, with the eastern differing in having less red on its bill; the two are treated at subspecies rank by IOC

== Behaviour ==
These species are found in forest clearings and edges, second growth and other semi-open habitats such as plantation shade trees. The eggs are laid in a bed of dry leaves in a tree hole, often an old woodpecker nest. The female incubates alone, but both parents feed the chicks. Fledging takes up to 25 days.

Tityras are seen alone or in pairs, perched conspicuously as they feed on medium-sized fruit, large insects and sometimes small lizards. They have unmusical nasal grunting or buzzing calls.
