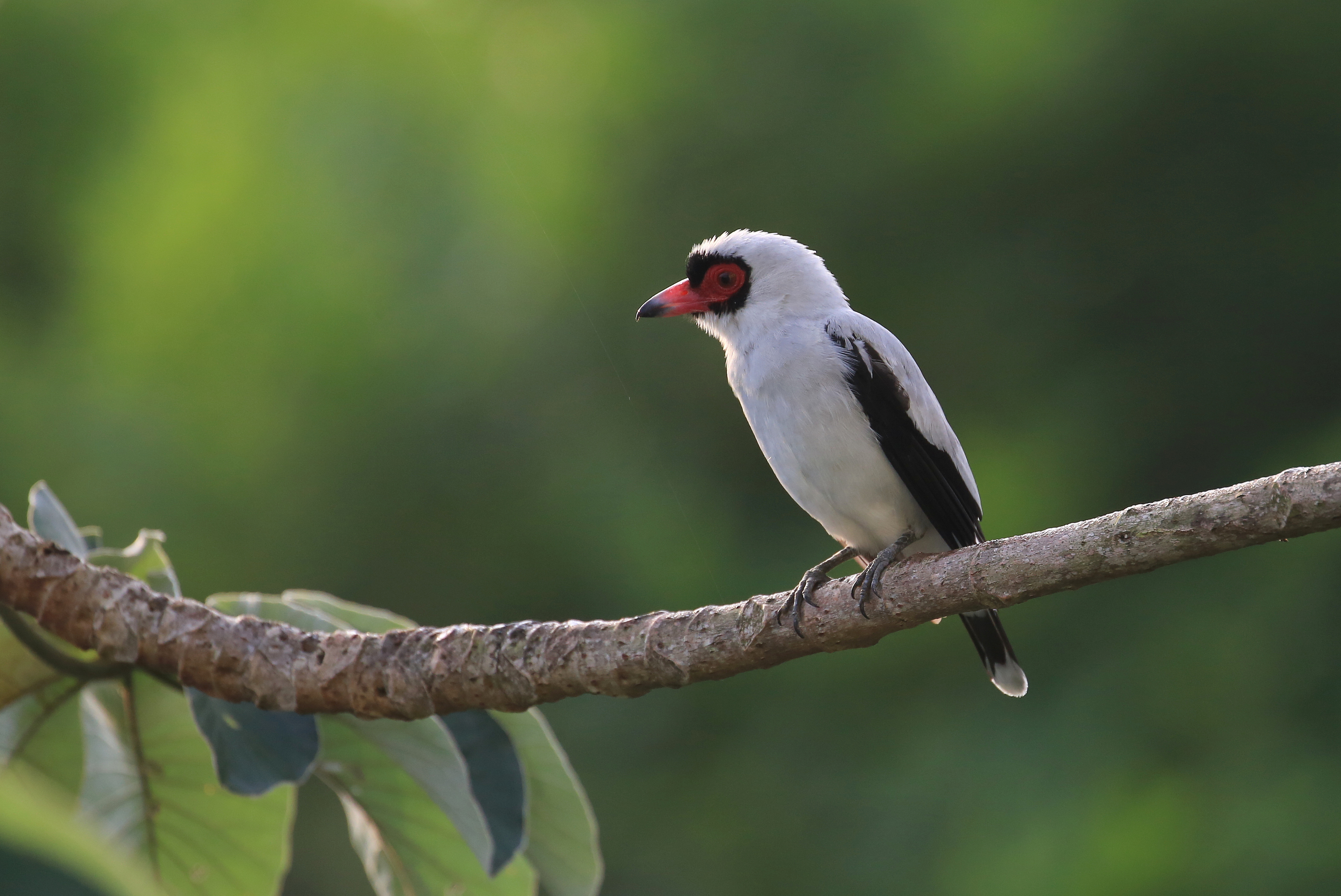
- Male
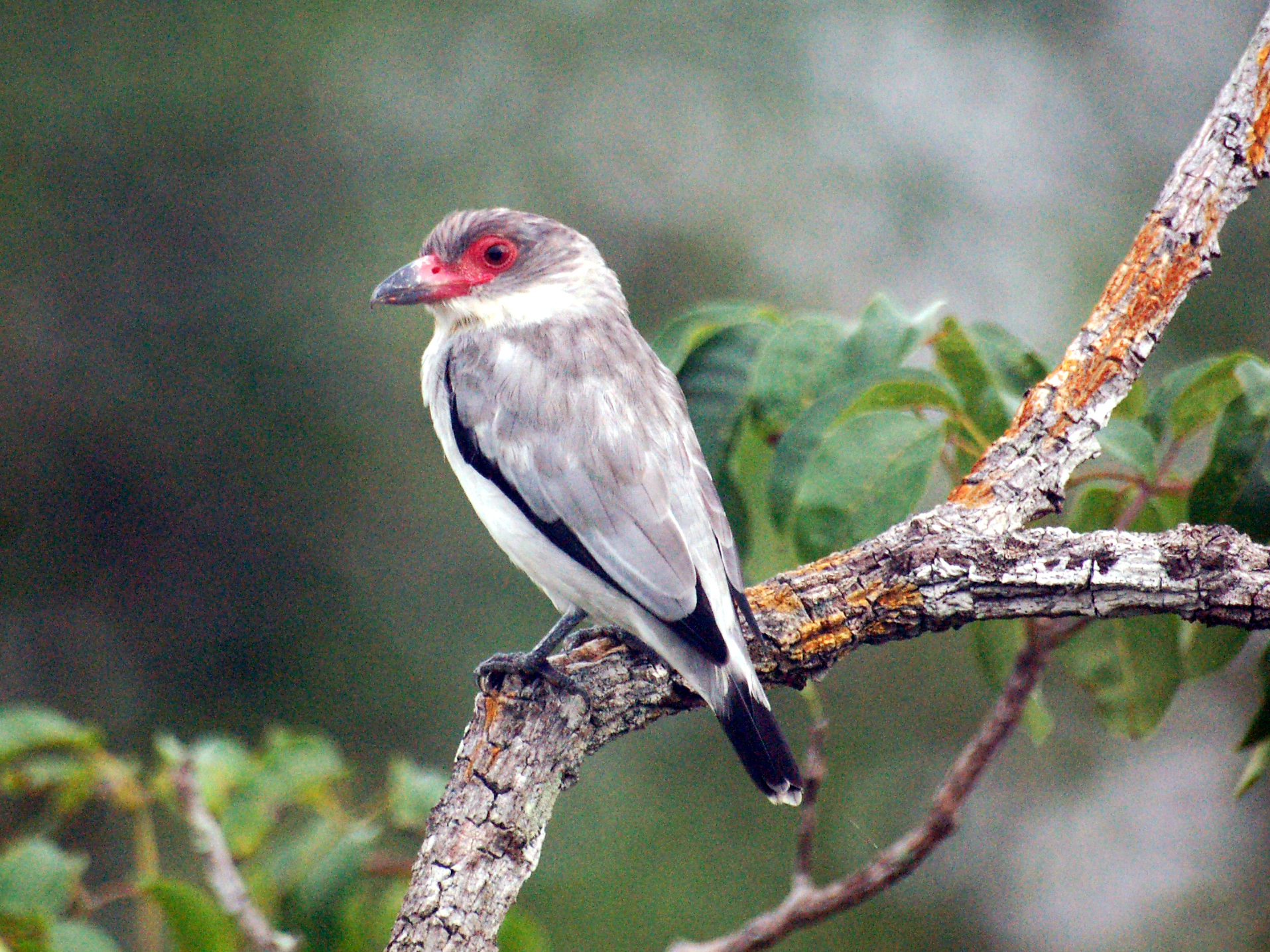
- Female

Conservation status
- Least Concern (IUCN 3.1)

Scientific classification
- Kingdom: Animalia
- Phylum: Chordata
- Class: Aves
- Order: Passeriformes
- Family: Tityridae
- Genus: Tityra
- Species: T. semifasciata

Binomial name
- Tityra semifasciata (Spix, 1825)

= Masked tityra =

Species of bird

The masked tityra (Tityra semifasciata) is a medium-sized passerine bird. It is found in Mexico, every Central American country, and every northern and central mainland South American country except the Guianas.

== Taxonomy and systematics ==
The masked tityra was originally described in 1825 as Pachyrhynchus semifasciatus. However, genus Pachyrhynchus had been created in 1820 for beetles so by the principle of priority the masked tityra required assignment to a different genus. It eventually was placed in Tityra that Vieillot had erected in 1816. All of the tityras were for a time included in the tyrant flycatcher family Tyrannidae before they, becards, and a few other species were assigned to their current family Tityridae.

The masked tityra has these nine subspecies:

- T. s. hannumi Van Rossem & Hachisuka, 1937
- T. s. griseiceps Ridgway, 1888
- T. s. deses Bangs, 1915
- T. s. personata Jardine & Selby, 1827
- T. s. costaricensis Ridgway, 1906
- T. s. columbiana Ridgway, 1906
- T. s. nigriceps Allen, JA, 1888
- T. s. semifasciata (Spix, 1825)
- T. s. fortis Berlepsch & Stolzmann, 1896

== Description ==
The masked tityra is 20 to 24 cm (7.9 to 9.4 in) long and weighs 77 to 88 g (2.7 to 3.1 oz). The species is sexually dimorphic. Adult males of the nominate subspecies T. s. semifasciata have bare rosy red skin from their bill to and around their eye. They have a black forecrown and the color wraps behind and under the red skin. The rest of their head and their upperparts are pale grayish white with a heavy pearly gray cast. Their wings are mostly black with grayish white tertials. Their tail is grayish white with a wide black band near the end. Their throat and underparts are whitish. Adult females have the same bare red skin as males but without any black on the head; their head is a smokier gray than the male's. Their upperparts are a darker gray than the male's with brown streaks and smudges. Their wings and tail are like the male's. Their throat and underparts are a dingy pale grayish.

The other subspecies of the masked tityra differ from the nominate and each other thus:

- T. s. hannumi: very similar to nominate
- T. s. griseiceps: (male) grayer upperparts; (female) pale gray head and upperparts, gray-brown wash on back, paler and grayer wing coverts
- T. s. deses: paler overall
- T. s. personata: (male) grayish brown head and upperparts, darker on the head
- T. s. costaricensis: (male) upperparts, wing coverts, and base of tail paler gray; (female) darker than nominate, especially the head
- T. s. columbiana: (male) less white on base of outer tail feathers; (female) browner upperparts
- T. s. nigriceps: (male) whiter overall with more black on the face and wider black tail band
- T. s. fortis: very similar to nominate with a longer bill

Both sexes of all subspecies have a reddish brown to brick-red iris, a slightly hooked rosy red bill with a black end, and blackish legs and feet.

== Distribution and habitat ==
The subspecies of the masked tityra are found thus:

- T. s. hannumi: northwestern Mexico in southeastern Sonora, southwestern Chihuahua, and northeastern Sinaloa
- T. s. griseiceps: coastal western Mexico from north-central Sinaloa south to southern Oaxaca
- T. s. deses: Yucatán and northern Quintana Roo in southeastern Mexico
- T. s. personata: eastern Mexico from southwestern Tamaulipas to Campeche and south through Belize, both sides of Guatemala, central and western Honduras, and El Salvador into north-central Nicaragua
- T. s. costaricensis: from southeastern Honduras south through most of Nicaragua and Costa Rica into western and central Panama including Coiba and Cébaco islands
- T. s. columbiana: eastern Panama, western Colombia to Chocó Department and east across the country, the Serranía del Perijá on the Colombia-Venezuela border, both slopes of the Venezuelan Andes, and the Venezuelan Coastal Range from Yaracuy to Miranda (but see below)
- T. s. nigriceps: from Nariño Department in extreme southwestern Colombia south through western Ecuador to Guayas and northwestern Azuay provinces
- T. s. semifasciata: Brazil south of the Amazon River from central Amazonas state to the Atlantic in Amapá and south to Rondônia, southern Mato Grosso and northern Goiás and into eastern Paraguay; possibly as far south as far northeastern Argentina (but see below)
- T. s. fortis: east slope of Colombia's Eastern Andes and south through eastern Ecuador, and eastern Peru into northern and eastern Bolivia and east into Brazil's Amazonas

Some sources include Trinidad and French Guiana in the species' range but the South American Classification Committee has no records in either country.

The masked tityra inhabits a variety of forested landscapes in the tropical and lower subtropical zones, most of which are somewhat open. These include the canopy, clearings, and edges of lowland evergreen forest, montane evergreen forest, and secondary forest, semi-open woodland; savanna with scattered trees, and plantations. In elevation it ranges from sea level to 2,500 m (8,200 ft) in western Mexico and northern Central America, to 1,800 m (5,900 ft) in Costa Rica and Venezuela, to 1,600 m (5,200 ft) in Colombia and Peru, and to 1,100 m (3,600 ft) in Ecuador.

== Behavior ==
=== Movement ===
The masked tityra is a year round resident. However, one individual spent February and March 1989 in southern Texas following an extensive freeze in Mexico.

=== Feeding ===
The masked tityra feeds mostly on fruits and also includes invertebrates and occasionally small lizards in its diet. It forages singly, in pairs, and in small groups, and is not known to join mixed-species feeding flocks. It forages mostly from the forest's mid-story to its canopy, perching in the open and gleaning while perched or while hopping along a branch. It also sometimes takes its food with a short sally, with or without a brief hover, from the perch.

=== Breeding ===
The masked tityra's breeding season varies geographically. It includes May in Guatemala, March to July in Costa Rica, and January to May in Colombia. Males display to females by running back and forth on a branch while drooping the wings and making a croaking sound. The species nests in a tree cavity, often a woodpecker hole, on a bed of dead leaves, twigs, and other plant fibers. Nests are mostly between about 12 and 30 m (40 and 100 ft) above the ground but have been found as low as 3.4 m (11 ft). The clutch is two to three eggs; the female alone incubates for about 18 to 21 days. Fledging occurs about 20 to 30 days after hatch and both parents provision nestlings.

=== Vocalization ===
The masked tityra has a wide variety of calls including "a distinctive buzzy, nasal, staccato, and croaking or clicking zzzu rrk or zzr zzzrt and rr-rr-rrk...a dry, nasal, and grunting or almost pig-like querp or kuert, sometimes doubled...or a longer and more rhythmic series of similar notes with two pitches, ghe-rák-gherik". It also makes a "quieter rruk, rruk or eg-eg call, snorted gaaaa, and variety of dry notes that recall some insect sounds".

== Status ==
The IUCN has assessed the masked titrya as being of Least Concern. It has an extremely large range; its estimated population of at least five million mature individuals is believed to be decreasing. No immediate threats have been identified. It is considered "fairly common to common" in northern Central America, "common and widespread" in Costa Rica, common in Colombia, fairly common in Ecuador, the "most common and widespread tityra" in Peru, "fairly common to common" in Venezuela, and "common to frequent" in Brazil. It is found in many national parks and other protected areas and "[m]uch suitable habitat for this [species] remains in relatively pristine condition within its large range".

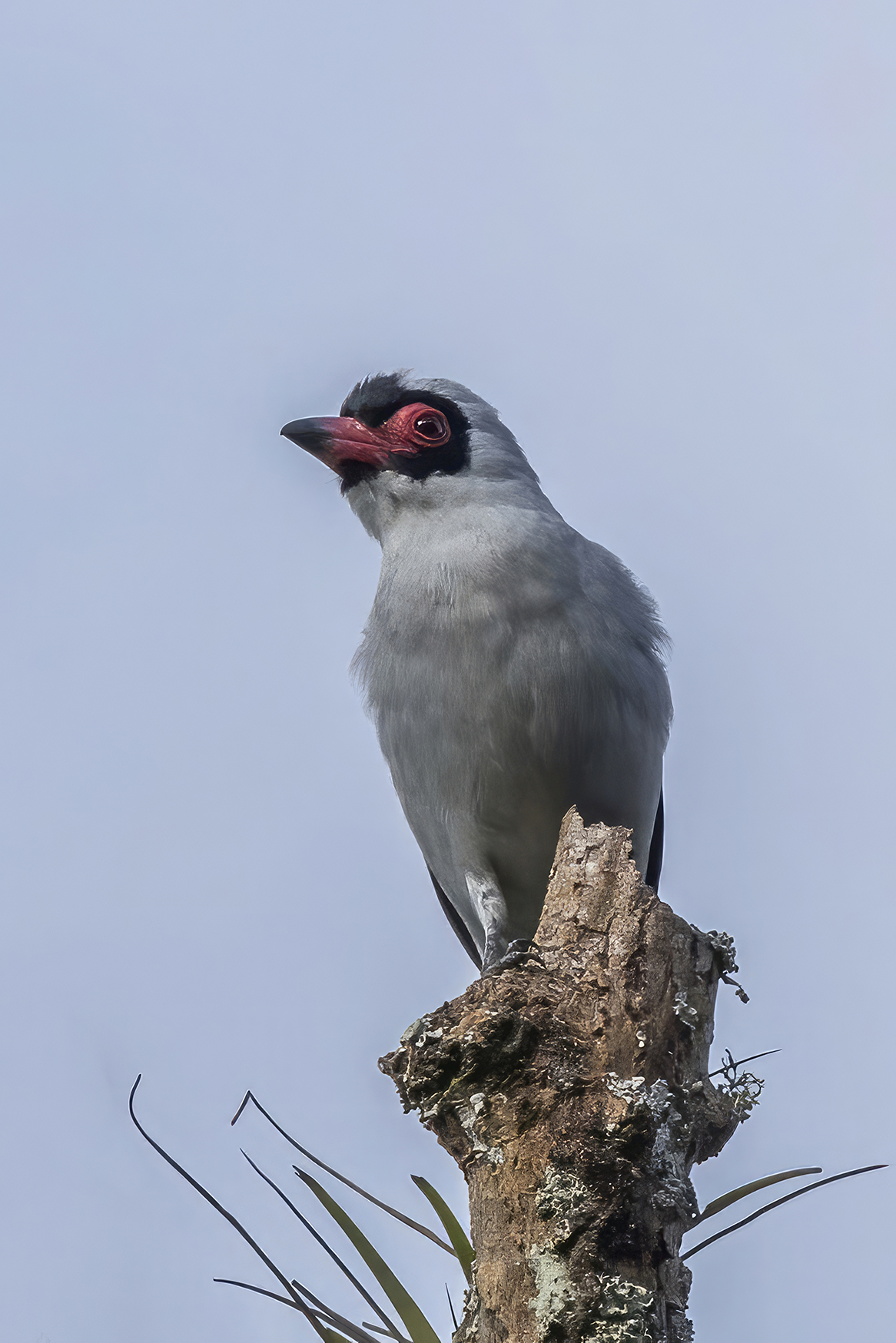
T. s. personata
Copan, Honduras

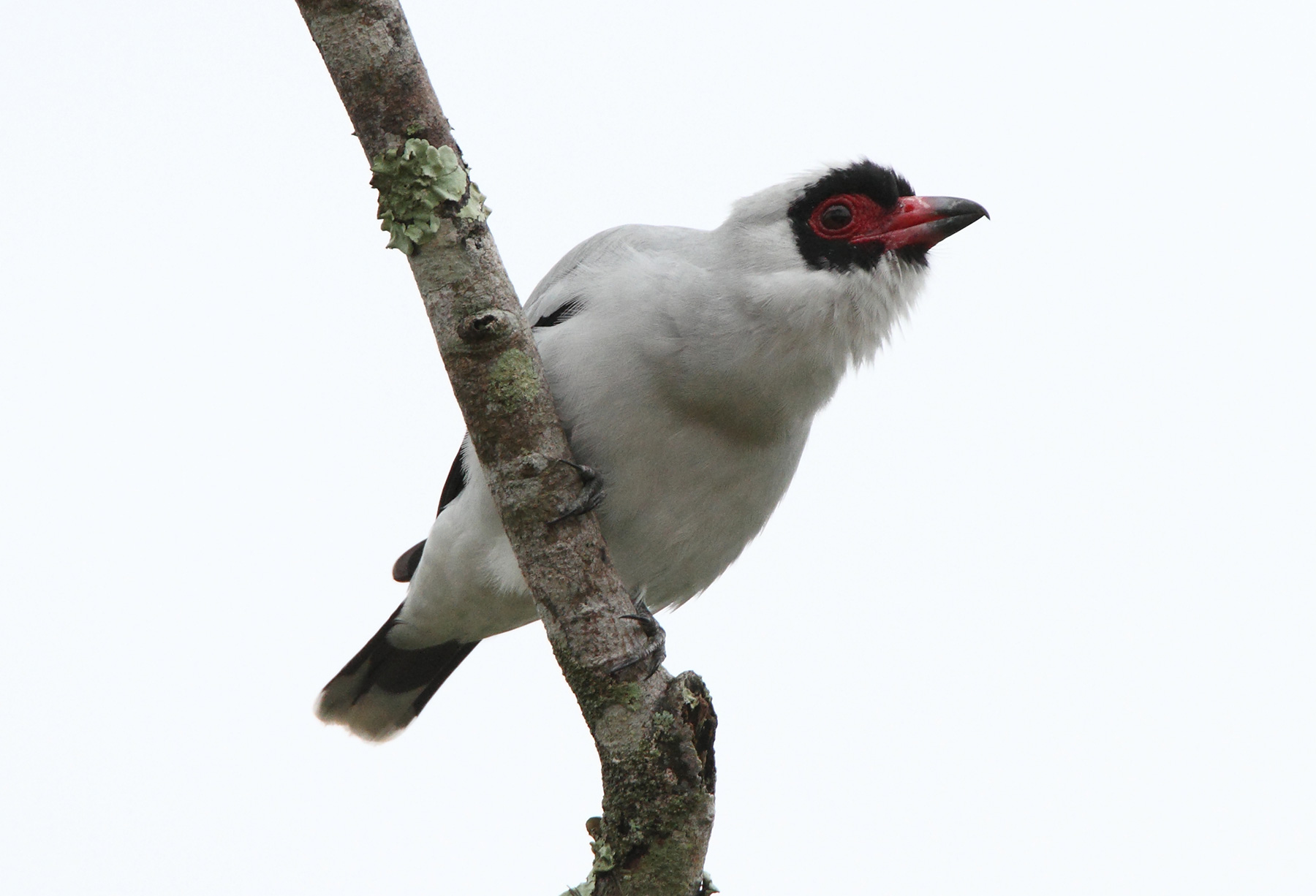
T. s. costaricensis
Turrialba, Costa Rica
