= White-tailed tityra =

Conservation status
- Data Deficient (IUCN 3.1)

Scientific classification
- Kingdom: Animalia
- Phylum: Chordata
- Class: Aves
- Order: Passeriformes
- Family: Tityridae
- Genus: Tityra
- Species: T. leucura

Binomial name
- Tityra leucura von Pelzeln, 1868

Species of bird

The white-tailed tityra (Tityra leucura) is a medium-sized passerine bird about 19 cm long with pied plumage, mostly white or very pale grey, but with a black crown and wings.

It is found in a small area of the Amazon rainforest near the Madeira River in the far west of Brazil close to the Peruvian border. It was first discovered in 1829 but the one specimen collected then, an immature male, sat forgotten in the Natural History Museum, Vienna until 1868, when August von Pelzeln concluded it represented an undescribed species. For many decades after that, no further individuals were seen; its close similarity to the widespread black-crowned tityra resulted in its being widely considered an aberrant specimen of that. Very recently however, further live male individuals were seen and later photographed in the same region in 2006 and 2022 respectively; re-evaluation based on these new sightings resulted in the conclusion that Pelzeln was correct in his decision to name it as a distinct species. It differs from black-crowned tityra in having a white, not black, tail.

== Identification ==
White-tailed tityra is the smallest of its genus. The male is a mainly white bird with a black crown and black on the wings, differing from black-crowned tityra in having a less extensive black crown and a completely white tail, without the broad black band of its relative. The female plumage is unknown. Its weight and length are unrecorded, but the wing length is 101 millimetres (4.0 in), the tail 63 millimetres (2.5 in) and the bill is 16.5 millimetres (0.65 in).

== Behaviour ==
Like others of its genus, white-tailed tityra forages for invertebrates in trees and bushes, typically moving slowly through the branches. It will join mixed-species foraging flocks with other local birds such as tanagers. Little else is known about the behaviour, breeding or vocalisations of this species.
