= Andrew Whittaker (engineer) =

American structural engineer

- Born: Andrew Stuart Whittaker; February 14, 1956 (age 70)
- Education: University of Melbourne, University of California, Berkeley
- Occupations: Professor, engineer, University at Buffalo
- Known for: Contributions to the development of performance-based earthquake engineering, blast and impact engineering, and to seismic isolation and damping systems for buildings, bridges and nuclear power plants.

Andrew Stuart Whittaker (born February 14, 1956) is an American structural engineer who is currently a SUNY Distinguished Professor in the Department of Civil, Structural and Environmental Engineering at the University at Buffalo, State University of New York.

== Education ==
Whittaker earned a bachelor's of science in civil engineering from the University of Melbourne, Australia in 1977. He received an M.S. in civil engineering in 1985, and his Ph.D. in civil engineering in 1988, both from the University of California, Berkeley.

== Professional career ==
Whittaker is a licensed civil (C45013) and structural (S3618) engineer in California. He worked for the international consultancy Aurecon (formerly John Connell and Associates) from 1978 to 1984 in Australia and Singapore, and for Forell/Elsesser Engineers in San Francisco, California from 1989 to 1992. Since 1992, he has consulted in the fields of earthquake, blast, and impact engineering, and performance-based design, applied to buildings, bridges, specialty structures, energy facilities, and nuclear power plants, in the Americas, Asia, and Europe.

=== Professional service ===
Whittaker has been engaged in the development of codes, standards and guidelines in the United States since the late 1980s, including the National Earthquake Hazards Reduction Program Recommended Provisions, the American Society of Civil Engineers/Structural Engineering Institute (ASCE/SEI) Standards 4, 7, 41, 43, and 59, and American Concrete Institute (ACI) Code 349. He chaired the ASCE Nuclear Standards Committee, which oversees the development of ASCE/SEI Standards 1, 4 and 43, from 2015 to 2025. He co-chairs ASCE/SEI Standard 92, which is merging and modernizing ASCE/SEI 4 and 43.

Whittaker has served on the Board of Directors for the Structural Engineers Association of Northern California (SEAONC) from 1996 to 1998, for the Earthquake Engineering Research Institute (EERI) from 2008 to 2010, and for the World Seismic Safety Initiative (WSSI) from 2008 to 2010. He served on the External Advisory Council for the Southern California Earthquake Center from 2010 to 2017 and serves on the Board of Directors for TerraPraxis. Whittaker was Vice President (2003 to 2004) and President (2005 to 2011) of the Consortium of Universities for Research in Earthquake Engineering (CUREE).

== Research career ==
Whittaker has developed applied research products for use in the seismic and blast/impact analysis and design of buildings, bridges, and infrastructure, including nuclear power plants. His research products are referenced in ASCE/SEI Standards 4, 7, 41, and 43, the AASHTO Guide Specification for Seismic Isolation Design, and FEMA 273, 27, and P-58. Whittaker was a contributor to the development of the first generation of tools for performance-based earthquake engineering, first published as FEMA 273 and FEMA 274, and later as ASCE 41, and led the Structural Performance Products team that developed the second generation of tools for performance-based earthquake engineering, published as FEMA-P-58 Volumes 1, 2 and 3. He directed ATC project 34 that studied seismic response modification factors and other critical code issues (1993 to 2002) and ATC Project 82 that developed guidance on the selection and scaling of earthquake ground motions for response-history analysis (2010 to 2012). Whittaker developed the technical basis for maximum-direction ground motions for ASCE/SEI 7-10, and for the implementation of seismic isolation in nuclear facilities that is codified in Chapter 12 of ASCE/SEI 4-16, and Chapter 9 of ASCE/SEI 43-19, and is documented in three NUREG/CRs published by the US Nuclear Regulatory Commission.

== Honors and awards ==
Whittaker has held the rank of State University of New York (SUNY) Distinguished Professor, the highest academic rank in the SUNY system, since 2018. He received the American Society of Civil Engineers (ASCE) Walter P. Moore Award in 2017, the ASCE Stephen D. Bechtel Energy Award in 2017, and the ASCE Nathan M. Newmark Medal in 2023. He was elected to Fellow of the American Concrete Institute in 2012, Fellow of the American Society of Civil Engineers in 2016, and Fellow of the Structural Engineering Institute of ASCE in 2016., and Distinguished Member of ASCE in 2025. In 2025, Whittaker was awarded a Doctor of Engineering, honoris causa, by the University of Melbourne, Australia, and elected a member of the University of California, Berkeley Civil and Environmental Engineering Academy of Distinguished Alumni. He was elected a member of the US National Academy of Engineering in 2026. In 2002, Whittaker, together with his SUNY colleague Michael Constantinou and Thornton-Tomasetti, received the American Council of Engineering Companies and the New York Association of Consulting Engineering Companies Diamond Award.

== Selected papers ==
- Huang, Y.-N., A. S. Whittaker and N. Luco, "Maximum spectral demands in the near-fault region," Earthquake Spectra, Vol. 24, No. 1, June 2008 pp. 319–341.
- Huang, Y.-N., A. S. Whittaker, N. Luco, and R. O. Hamburger, "Selection and scaling of earthquake ground motions in support of performance-based design," Journal of Structural Engineering, Vol. 137, No. 3, 2011, pp. 311–321.
- Huang, Y.-N., A. S. Whittaker, and N. Luco, "A seismic risk assessment procedure for nuclear power plants, (I) methodology," Nuclear Engineering and Design, Vol. 241, 2011, pp. 3996–4003.
- Kumar, M., A. S. Whittaker and M. C. Constantinou, "An advanced numerical model of elastomeric seismic isolation bearings," Earthquake Engineering & Structural Dynamics, Vol. 43, No. 13, 2014, pp. 1955–1974.
- Kumar, M., A. S. Whittaker, and M. C. Constantinou, "Characterizing friction in sliding isolation bearings," Earthquake Engineering & Structural Dynamics, Vol. 44, No. 9, 2015, pp. 1409–1425.
- Shin, J., A. S. Whittaker, and D. Cormie, "Incident and normally reflected overpressure and impulse for detonations of spherical high explosives in free air," Journal of Structural Engineering, Vol. 141, No. 12, 2015.
- Coleman, J., C. Bolisetti, and A.S. Whittaker. "Time-domain soil-structure interaction analysis of nuclear facilities," Nuclear Engineering and Design, Vol. 298, pp. 264–270, March 2016.
- Whittaker, A. S., P. Sollogoub, and M.-K. Kim, "Seismic isolation of nuclear power plants: Past, present and future," Nuclear Engineering and Design, Vol. 338, 2018, pp. 290–299.
- Kumar, M. and A. S. Whittaker, "Cross-platform implementation, verification and validation of advanced models of elastomeric seismic isolation bearings," Engineering Structures, Vol. 175, 2018, pp. 926–943.
- Shin, J., and A. S. Whittaker, “Blast wave clearing for detonations of high explosives,” Journal of Structural Engineering, Vol. 145, No. 7, July 2019, DOI:10.1061/(ASCE)ST.1943-541X.0002327.
- Terranova, B., A. S. Whittaker, and L. Schwer, “Design of reinforced concrete walls and slabs for wind-borne missile loadings,” Engineering Structures, Vol. 194, pp. 357–369, September 2019, DOI: 10.1016/j.engstruct.2019.05.001.
- Deshpande, A. D. and A. S. Whittaker, “Seismic behavior of reinforced concrete walls at elevated temperature,” ACI Structural Journal, Vol. 116, No. 5, pp. 113–124, September 2019, DOI: 10.14359/51715636.
- Rivera, J. and A. S. Whittaker, “Damage and peak shear strength in low-aspect-ratio reinforced concrete shear walls,” Journal of Structural Engineering, Vol. 145, No. 11, November 2019, DOI: 10.1061/(ASCE)ST.1943-541X.0002364.
- Lal, K. M., S. S. Parsi, B. D. Kosbab, E. Ingersoll, H. Charkas, and A. S. Whittaker, “Towards standardized advanced nuclear reactors: seismic isolation and the impact of the earthquake load case,” Nuclear Engineering and Design, Vol. 386, January 2022, DOI: 10.1016/j.nucengdes.2021.111487.
- Parsi, S. S., K. M. Lal, B. D. Kosbab, E. Ingersoll, K. Shirvan, and A. S. Whittaker, “Seismic isolation: a pathway to standardized advanced nuclear reactors,” Nuclear Engineering and Design, Vol. 387, February 2022, DOI: 10.1016/j.nucengdes.2021.111445.
- Yu, C.-C., A. S. Whittaker, B. D. Kosbab, and P. K. Tehrani, “Earthquake-induced impact of base-isolated buildings: theory, numerical modeling, and design solutions,” Earthquake Engineering & Structural Dynamics, Vol. 52, No. 5, April 2023, pp. 1445–1462, DOI: 10.1002/eqe.3824.
- Mir, F. U. H., A. S. Whittaker, B. D. Kosbab, and N. Nguyen, “Characterizing the seismic response of a molten salt nuclear reactor,” Earthquake Engineering & Structural Dynamics, Vol. 52, No. 7, pp. 2025–2046, June 2023, DOI: 10.1002/eqe.3866.
- Parsi, S. S., M. V. Sivaselvan, and A. S. Whittaker, "Impedance-matching model-in-the-loop simulation," Earthquake Engineering and Structural Dynamics, Vol. 52, No. 12, September 2023, pp. 3600–3621, DOI: 10.1002/eqe.3922
- Mir, F. U. H., C.-C. Yu, M. M. Talaat, B. M. Carmichael, B. M. Chisholm, and A. S. Whittaker, "Risk-informed, performance-based seismic design of a seismic isolation system for a nuclear power plant," published online, Earthquake Engineering and Structural Dynamics, Vol. 54, No. 9, July 2025, pp. 2231–2245, DOI: 10.1002/eqe.4359
- Parsi, S. S., A. S. Whittaker, M. V. Sivaselvan, E. Velez-Lopez, W. E. Stewart, and K. Shirvan, "Experimental investigations of the seismic response of graphite block assemblies in a horizontal compact HTGR core," Nuclear Engineering and Design, Vol. 443, July 2025, pp. 114300, DOI:10.1016/j.nucengdes.2025.114300.
- Lal, K. M., A. S. Whittaker, S. Vahdani, B. D. Kosbab, and K. Shirvan, "Seismically isolated nuclear power plants: Is soil-structure-interaction analysis needed?" Earthquake Engineering and Structural Dynamics, Vol. 54, No. 10, August 2025, pp. 2601–2620, DOI: 10.1002/eqe.4373
- Patel, A. D., D. R. Peterman, E. D. Kitcher, C. Bolisetti, and A. S. Whittaker, "Integrating HPC simulations and physical experiments to characterize the effects of gamma radiation on seismic protective devices," Nuclear Engineering and Design, Vol. 444, December 2025, pp. 114361, DOI: 1016/j.nucengdes.2025.114361.
