= Sensing =

Sensing is the present participle of the verb sense. It may also refer to:

- Myers-Briggs sensing, a cognitive function (measured by the Myers-Briggs Type Indicator assessment) that focuses on the tangible and concrete over the abstract and theoretical
- Remote sensing a technique used in several scientific fields
- Sensor operation, the detection of a physical presence and the conversion of that data into a signal that can be read by an observer or an instrument

== See also ==
- Sense
- Sense (disambiguation)
- Sensory (disambiguation)
