= Sense (disambiguation) =

A sense in biology and psychology, is a physiological mechanism that supports perception.

Sense also may refer to:

== Music ==
- Sense (band), a synthpop trio featuring Paul K. Joyce
- Sense (FURT album), 2009
- Sense (In the Nursery album), 1991
- Sense (Mr. Children album), 2010
- Sense (The Lightning Seeds album), 1992
- "Sense" (song), 2021 song by Band-Maid
- "Sense", 2001 song by Joe Morris from Singularity
- "Sense", 2018 song by Last Dinosaurs from Yumeno Garden
- "Sense", 1992 song by The Lightning Seeds from Sense
- "Sense", 1994 song by Terry Hall from Home
- "Sense", 2013 song by Tom Odell from Long Way Down
- "Senses", 1981 song by New Order from Movement
- "Senses", 1970 song by Willie Nelson from Laying My Burdens Down
- "The Sense", 2002 song by Hot Water Music from Caution
- "Sense", 2015 song by King Gizzard & the Lizard Wizard from the album Paper Mâché Dream Balloon

== Other ==
- Sense (electronics), a technique used in power supplies to produce the correct voltage for a load
- Sense (molecular biology), the roles of nucleic-acid molecules in specifying amino acids
- Sense (programming), an educational programming environment
- Sense (river), a tributary of the River Saane in Switzerland
- Sense, The National Deafblind and Rubella Association, a charitable organization based in the United Kingdom.
- Sense Worldwide, a London-based co-creation consulting company
- HTC Sense, a mobile software suite developed by HTC
- Senses (tribe), a Dacian tribe
- Sense: A Cyberpunk Ghost Story, a video game

== See also ==
- Common sense, sound practical judgment concerning everyday matters
- Sense and reference, philosophical distinction introduced by Gottlob Frege
- Sensor, a mechanism to detect events or changes in its environment
- The Senses (Rembrandt), a series of paintings
- Word sense, the meaning carried by a word
- Sensory (disambiguation)
- Sensuality (disambiguation)
