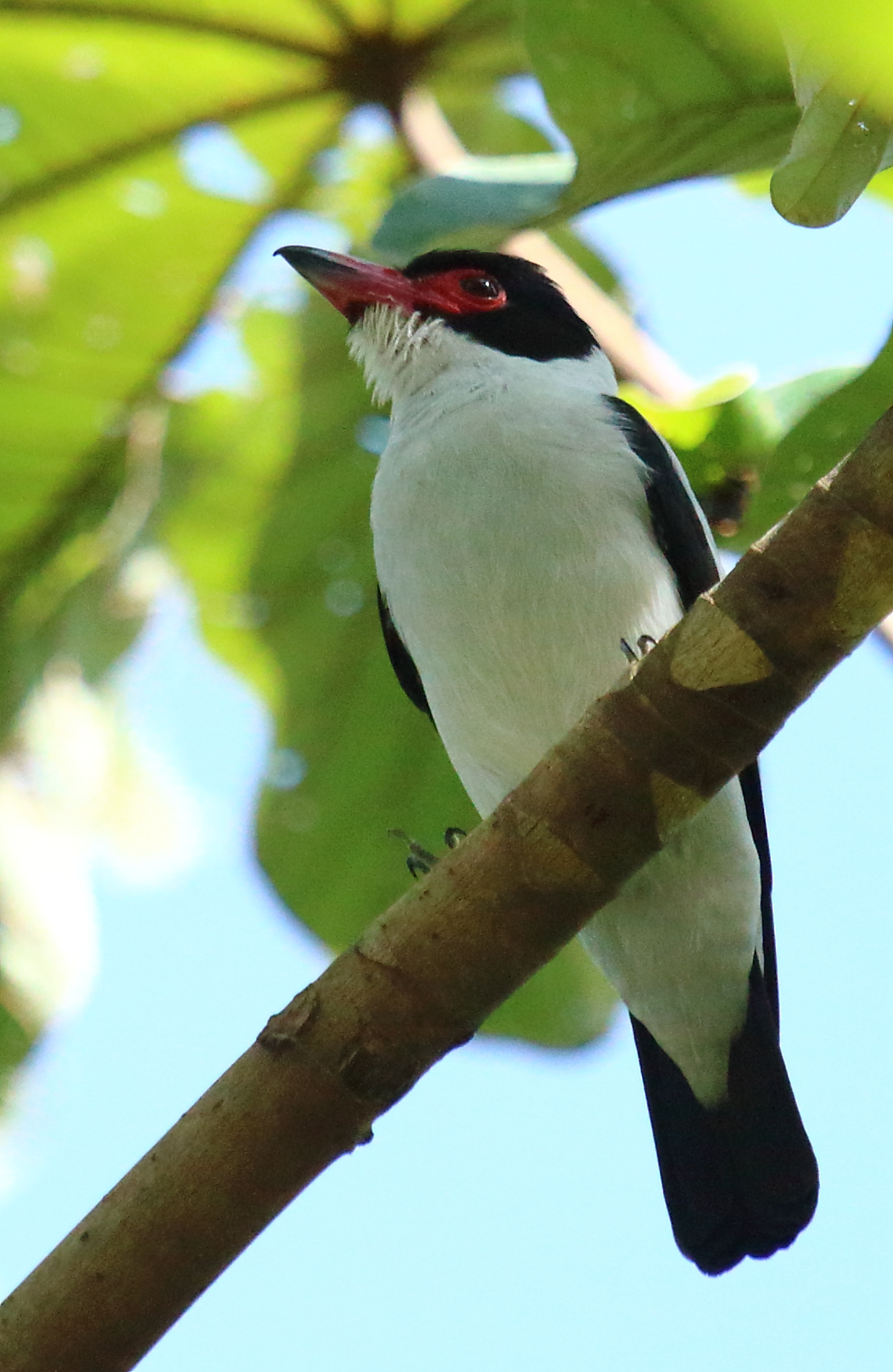
- Black-tailed tityra photographed in the Arena Forest Preserve on January 17, 2017 in Trinidad.

Conservation status
- Least Concern (IUCN 3.1)

Scientific classification
- Kingdom: Animalia
- Phylum: Chordata
- Class: Aves
- Order: Passeriformes
- Family: Tityridae
- Genus: Tityra
- Species: T. cayana

Binomial name
- Tityra cayana (Linnaeus, 1766)

Synonyms
- Lanius cayanus Linnaeus, 1766; Tityra braziliensis (Swainson, 1837)

= Black-tailed tityra =

Species of bird

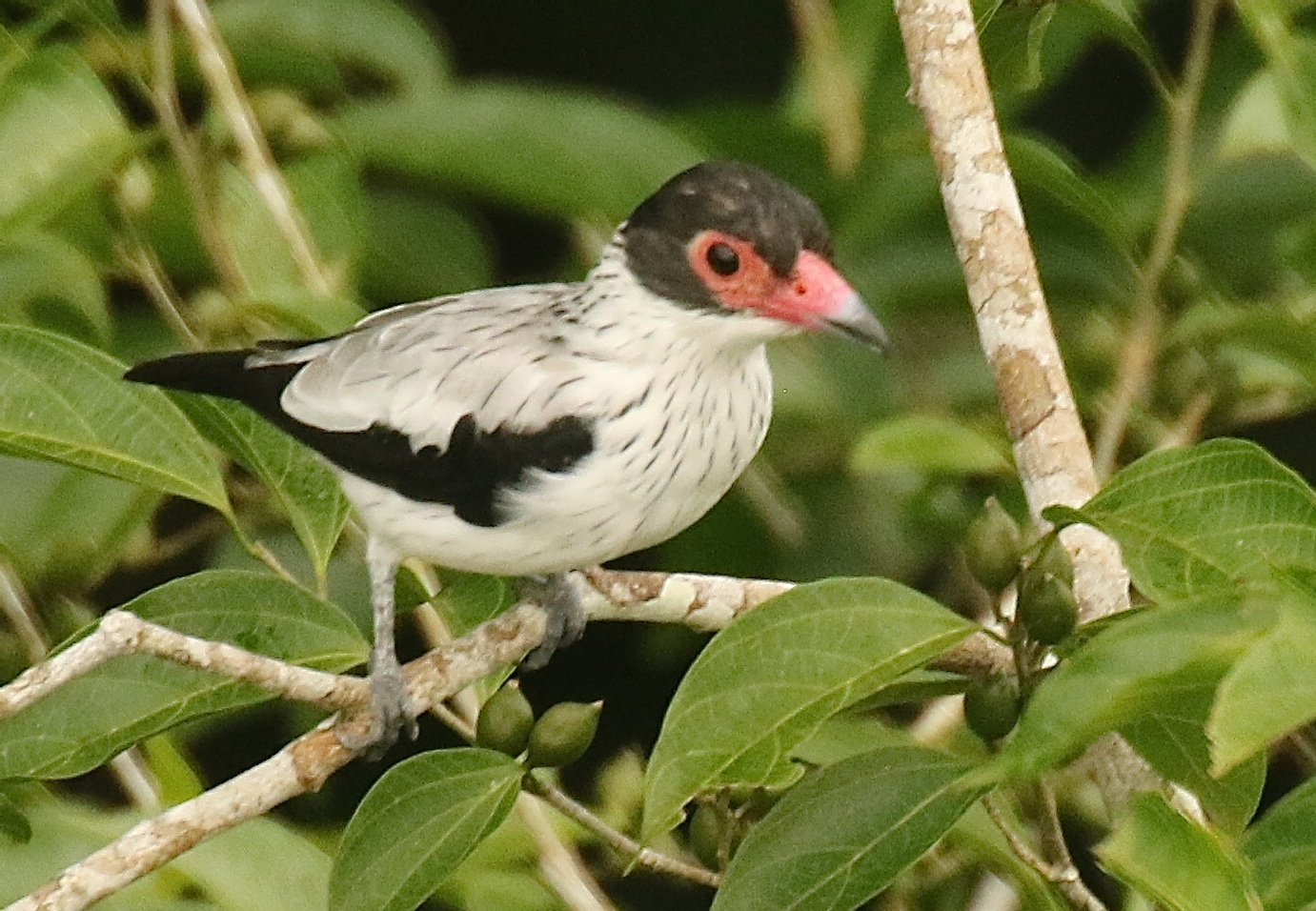
Sacha Lodge - Ecuador

The black-tailed tityra (Tityra cayana) is a medium-sized passerine bird of tropical South America. The tityras have been placed in the cotinga or the tyrant flycatcher families (Cotingidae and Tyrannidae) by various authors. But the weight of evidence strongly suggest they and their closest relatives are better separated as Tityridae; the AOU for example advocates this separation.

== Taxonomy ==
In 1760, the French zoologist Mathurin Jacques Brisson included a description of the black-tailed tityra in his Ornithologie based on a specimen collected in Cayenne in French Guiana. He used the French name La pie-griesche gris de Cayenne and the Latin name Lanius Cayanensis cinereus. Although Brisson coined Latin names, these do not conform to the binomial system and are not recognised by the International Commission on Zoological Nomenclature. When Swedish naturalist Carl Linnaeus updated his Systema Naturae for the twelfth edition in 1766, he added 240 species that had been previously described by Brisson. One of these was the black-tailed tityra. Linnaeus included a brief description, coined the binomial name Lanius cayanus and cited Brisson's work. The species is now placed in the genus Tityra, which was introduced by the French ornithologist Louis Pierre Vieillot in 1816.

Most taxonomic systems recognize these two subspecies. However, BirdLife International's Handbook of the Birds of the World (HBW) treats them as separate species, the "western black-tailed tityra" and "eastern black-tailed tityra" respectively.

- T. c. cayana (Linnaeus, 1766) – Northern South America east of the Andes, from Trinidad across the Amazonas basin to Piauí and Mato Grosso (Brazil) and adjacent Bolivia.

Red bill base wide. Male greyish on back. Female with distinct brownish cap and little streaking on breast and back; throat white.

- T. c. braziliensis (Swainson, 1838) – Piauí, Mato Grosso and adjacent Bolivia southeastwards to Misiones and possibly Corrientes Province (Argentina)

Red bill base narrow. Male white on back. Female lacks distinct cap, streaked strongly on entire head, neck, back and underside.

== Description ==
This is a robust, short-tailed bird with a long, hook-tipped bill; like other tityras, it has a peculiar vestigial ninth primary feather. The adult black-tailed tityra is 20–22 centimetres (7.9–8.7 in) long and weighs 60–70 grams (2.1–2.5 oz). The male is dull white above and white below. The rectrices, the primary and secondary remiges and a cap extending to below the eyes are black; the tertiary remiges are silvery grey. Females have dark brown rather than black on wings and tail and some brown pattern on head, back and underside. In both sexes, there is a patch of rosy-red bare skin around the eye, extending to the bill which is red-based with a black tip. The iris and feet are dark. The juvenile plumage is unknown.

=== Voice ===
This species has a buzzing short call rendered as ed, rek, urd or wenk. A double beeza-buzza and triple weenk, weenk, weenk are also given. It more frequently calls in flight than when perched.

== Distribution and habitat ==
This bird is found as a year-round resident in forest edges, second growth and plantation shade trees in the pantanal and cerrado as well as in terra firme and várzea, usually below 500 metres (1,600 ft) but occasionally as far up as 1,100 metres (3,600 ft) ASL.

== Behaviour ==
Black-tailed tityras are most commonly seen in pairs, or, less frequently, single or in small groups; they are intolerant of other birds and will try to chase them away. They are often seen perched conspicuously as they feed on medium-sized fruits. Food is gleaned from vegetation or picked off in mid-hover. While some large insects are caught, these are mainly fed to young birds; adults are predominantly frugivores and locally important dispersers of such species as the Meliaceae Cabralea canjerana. This species rarely attends mixed-species feeding flocks even when provisioning young, preferring to forage for insects on its own high up in the trees.

Its main breeding season appears to be from November to March across its range, but occasional nesting birds can be encountered almost year-round at least in some regions. For example, in the lowlands of Colombia and Ecuador, breeding activity has been reported in June and July also, suggesting either lack of a distinct breeding season and/or that two broods may be raised per year. The nest is several meters above ground in a tree hole, such as an old woodpecker nest or the crown of a dead palm tree. The brown-marked buff eggs are laid in a bed of dry leaves and some small twigs. Three eggs are considered likely, but exact clutch size is uncertain. Only the female incubates for almost three weeks until the young hatch, but both parents feed the chicks. Fledging is believed to take at least 3 weeks, perhaps as much as one month.

This species is one of the many hosts of the brood parasitic shiny cowbird (Molothrus bonariensis). It is not uncommon across its large range and occurs in many national parks and other protected areas. Therefore, it is considered a species of least concern by the IUCN.

== Status ==
The IUCN follows HBW taxonomy and so has separately assessed the "western" and "eastern" black-tailed tityras. Both are assessed as being of Least Concern. Both have very large ranges. The population size of neither is known and both are believed to be decreasing. No immediate threats to either have been identified.

== Sources ==
- Greeney, Harold F.; Gelis, Rudolphe A. & White, Richard (2004): Notes on breeding birds from an Ecuadorian lowland forest. Bull. B.O.C. 124(1): 28–37. PDF fulltext
- Machado, C.G. (1999): A composição dos bandos mistos de aves na Mata Atlântica da Serra de Paranapiacaba, no sudeste brasileiro [Mixed flocks of birds in Atlantic Rain Forest in Serra de Paranapiacaba, southeastern Brazil]. Revista Brasileira de Biologia 59(1): 75–85 [Portuguese with English abstract]. doi:10.1590/S0034-71081999000100010 PDF fulltext
- Mobley, J.A. (2004): 441. Black-tailed Tityra. In: del Hoyo, Josep; Elliott, Andrew & Sargatal, Jordi (eds.): Handbook of Birds of the World (Volume 9: Cotingas to Pipits and Wagtails): 450, Plate 47. Lynx Edicions, Barcelona. ISBN 84-87334-69-5
- South American Classification Committee (SACC) (2007): Proposal #313 - Adopt the Family Tityridae.
- del Hoyo, Josep; Mobley, Jason A.; Kirwan, Guy M.; Collar, Nigel (8 April 2022). Keeney, Brooke K. (ed.). "Black-tailed Tityra (Tityra cayana)". Birds of the World. doi:10.2173/bow.blttit1.01.1.
