= Senses (tribe) =

Dacian tribe

The Senses, or Sense, were a Dacian tribe in the southern region of Dacia.
