= Chestnut-headed nunlet =

Conservation status
- Least Concern (IUCN 3.1)

Scientific classification
- Kingdom: Animalia
- Phylum: Chordata
- Class: Aves
- Order: Piciformes
- Genus: Nonnula
- Species: N. amaurocephala

Binomial name
- Nonnula amaurocephala Chapman, 1921

Species of bird

The chestnut-headed nunlet (Nonnula amaurocephala) is a species of bird in the family Bucconidae, the puffbirds, nunlets, and nunbirds. It is endemic to Brazil.

== Taxonomy and systematics ==
The chestnut-headed nunlet is monotypic. It, the rufous-capped nunlet (N. ruficapilla), and the grey-cheeked nunlet (N. frontalis) form a superspecies.

== Description ==
The chestnut-headed nunlet is 14 to 15 cm (5.5 to 5.9 in) long and weighs 15 to 16 g (0.53 to 0.56 oz). Its entire head, upper mantle, breast, and upper belly are bright rufous. Its back, wings, and tail are plain dull brown; the rump has an olive wash. The rufous upper belly grades to whitish on the lower belly. The bill is mostly black, the eye red, and the feet lead gray.

== Distribution and habitat ==
The chestnut-headed nunlet is found only in a small part of Brazil's Amazonas state, north of the Amazon River and west of the Negro River. It almost exclusively inhabits the understory of seasonally flooded igapó forest, usually up to about 3 m (10 ft) above the ground but sometimes as high as 8 m (26 ft).

== Behavior ==
=== Feeding ===
The chestnut-headed nunlet has been observed sallying from a perch, presumably to catch invertebrate prey, but no details of its feeding behavior or diet have been published.

=== Breeding ===
No details of the chestnut-headed nunlet's breeding phenology have been published.

=== Vocalization ===
No recordings or description of the chestnut-headed nunlet's vocalizations are available as of late 2021.

== Status ==
The IUCN originally assessed the chestnut-headed nunlet in 1988 as Near Threatened but since 2004 has rated it as being of Least Concern. It has a very small range and unquantified population that is believed to be decreasing. Its igapó habitat is widespread and under little human pressure, and the species is probably undercounted due to its quiet and sedentary nature.
