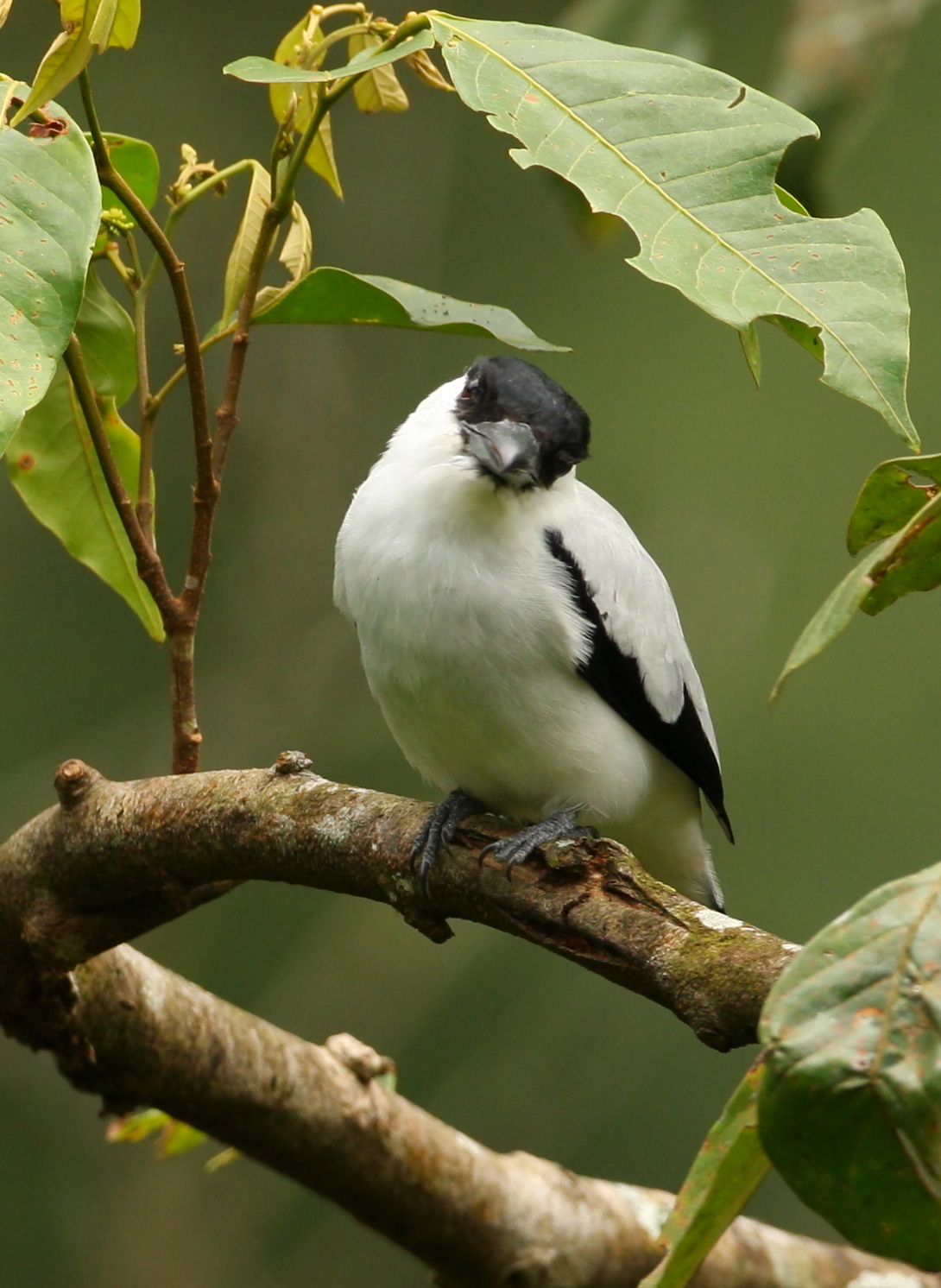
- Male, Rio Silanche Reserve, NW Ecuador

Conservation status
- Least Concern (IUCN 3.1)

Scientific classification
- Kingdom: Animalia
- Phylum: Chordata
- Class: Aves
- Order: Passeriformes
- Family: Tityridae
- Genus: Tityra
- Species: T. inquisitor

Binomial name
- Tityra inquisitor (Lichtenstein, MHC, 1823)

Synonyms
- See text

= Black-crowned tityra =

Species of bird

The black-crowned tityra (Tityra inquisitor) is a medium-sized passerine bird. It is found in Mexico, every Central American country except El Salvador, and every mainland South American country except Chile and Uruguay.

== Taxonomy and systematics ==
The black-crowned tityra has a complicated taxonomic history. It was originally described in 1823 as Lanius inquisitor, mistakenly placing it in the shrike family. In 1851 Johann Jakob Kaup placed it in a new genus, Psaris; he noted that the genus was a synonym for Tityra that Vieillot had erected in 1816. In the early twentieth century some authors placed it in its own genus Erator which was then merged into Tityra in 1929, though some authors in the 1970s urged the species' return to Erator. All of the tityras were for a time included in the tyrant flycatcher family Tyrannidae before they, becards, and a few other species were assigned to their current family Tityridae.

The black-crowned tityra has these six subspecies:

- T. i. fraserii (Kaup, 1852)
- T. i. albitorques Du Bus de Gisignies, 1847
- T. i. buckleyi Salvin & Godman, 1890
- T. i. erythrogenys (Selby, 1826)
- T. i. pelzelni Salvin & Godman, 1890
- T. i. inquisitor (Lichtenstein, MHC, 1823)

== Description ==
The black-capped tityra is 16.5 to 20.5 cm (6.5 to 8.1 in) long and weighs 33.8 to 70 g (1.2 to 2.5 oz). The species is sexually dimorphic. Adult males of the nominate subspecies T. i. inquisitor have a mostly black head. Their nape and upperparts are whitish gray with a pearly gray cast. Their wings are mostly black with grayish white tertials. Their tail is black. Their throat and underparts are white. Adult females have a buffy forehead and a black cap on an otherwise chestnut or rusty face. Their upperparts are a slightly darker gray than the male's with dusky brownish streaks and coarse blackish spots. Their wings and tail are like the male's. Their throat and underparts are washed with dingy pale grayish buff.

The other subspecies of the black-capped tityra differ from the nominate and each other thus:

- T. i. fraserii: (male) white nape and cheeks, darker back, white inner webs of primaries, and pale grayish white underparts; (female) more brownish, less grayish, back
- T. i. albitorques: (male) white cheeks and ear coverts, pale gray back, mostly white tail with black band near the end, and grayish underparts; (female) unspotted variably brownish washed back and white lower belly and undertail coverts
- T. i. buckleyi: (male) white cheeks and ear coverts and mostly black tail with white at its base
- T. i. erythrogenys: (male) less white on nape and very little white at base of tail; (female) gray back without brown but with variable black spots, white throat and breast with slight grayish tinge
- T. i. pelzelni: tail mostly white

Both sexes of all subspecies have a dark iris, a bluish gray maxilla, a blackish mandible, and blackish legs and feet.

== Distribution and habitat ==
The subspecies of the black-crowned tityra are found thus:

- T. i. fraserii: in Mexico "southeastern San Luis Potosí, Veracruz, eastern Puebla, northern Oaxaca, Tabasco, and Chiapas, and the Yucatan Peninsula"; from there south across northern Guatemala and south through Belize and southeastern Guatemala and eastern Honduras, eastern Nicaragua, and both sides of Costa Rica to central Panama including islands off Chiriquí Province
- T. i. albitorques: eastern Panama, northern Colombia south in Magdalena River valley and along western Colombia into western Ecuador to Azuay Province; eastern Peru, northwestern Bolivia, and northwestern Brazil east along the Amazon to Manaus
- T. i. buckleyi: southern Colombia south through eastern Ecuador to Pastaza Province; possibly far northeastern Peru
- T. i. erythrogenys: Colombia east of the Andes east into Venezuela across the Guianas and northern Brazil north of the Amazon; in Venezuela west of the Andes, east of the Andes and across the country's northern half, and south through western Bolívar and western Amazonas states
- T. i. pelzelni: northern and eastern Bolivia east into Brazil south of the Amazon River, where bound roughly by the Madeira River, eastern Maranhão, and Mato Grosso
- T. i. inquisitor: east and southeastern Brazil from southern Piauí south through western Bahia and beyond to northern Rio Grande do Sul, eastern Paraguay, and northeastern Argentina to Corrientes Province including eastern Formosa and Chaco provinces

The black-crowned tityra inhabits lowland evergreen forest and secondary forest in the tropical and lower subtropical zones. It favors the forest canopy and edges, clearings and areas along waterways. It also is found in plantations and várzea forest. In elevation it overall occurs from sea level to about 1,200 m (3,900 ft). It reaches only 700 m (2,300 ft) in Ecuador, 600 m (2,000 ft) in Peru, and 1,100 m (3,600 ft) in Venezuela.

== Behavior ==
=== Movement ===
The black-crowned tityra is considered a year-round resident. However, it appears to occur in western Oaxaca only in winter.

=== Feeding ===
The black-crowned tityra feeds mostly on fruits and also includes invertebrates in its diet. It forages singly, in pairs, and in small family groups and only rarely joins mixed-species feeding flocks. It forages mostly from the forest's mid-story to its canopy, perching in the open and striking upward to take food from foliage. It less often gleans while perched and while briefly hovering after a sortie from a perch.

=== Breeding ===
The black-crowned tityra's breeding season varies geographically. It includes May in Guatemala, March to June in Costa Rica, March and April in Panama, May to July in Colombia, May to August and possibly beyond in Venezuela, January to April in Ecuador, November and December in southern Brazil, and October and November in Argentina. The species nests in a tree cavity, often a woodpecker hole, on a bed of dead leaves, twigs, and other plant fibers. The clutch is thought to be three eggs. The female alone incubates, for about 18 to 21 days. Fledging occurs about 20 to 30 days after hatch and both parents provision nestlings.

=== Vocalization ===
The black-crowned tityra is not highly vocal. It does make a variety of calls including "a husky grunting or dry guttural...variable sheh-shehk, squik or zick-zick-zick, and a series of low, weak, and nasal chet-chut, chaa-cherp notes". It also makes a "nasal grunting with buzzy quality, uurnt or uurnt-uurnt [and a] strange thin corre corre call".

== Status ==
The IUCN has assessed the black-capped titrya as being of Least Concern. It has an extremely large range; its estimated population of at least 500,000 mature individuals is believed to be decreasing. No immediate threats have been identified. It is considered uncommon in northern Central America, "widespread but fairly uncommon" in Costa Rica, fairly common in Colombia, uncommon in Ecuador, "uncommon but widspread" in Peru, "fairly common but locally distributed" in Venezuela, and "frequent to uncommon" in Brazil. It is found in many national parks and other protected areas.
