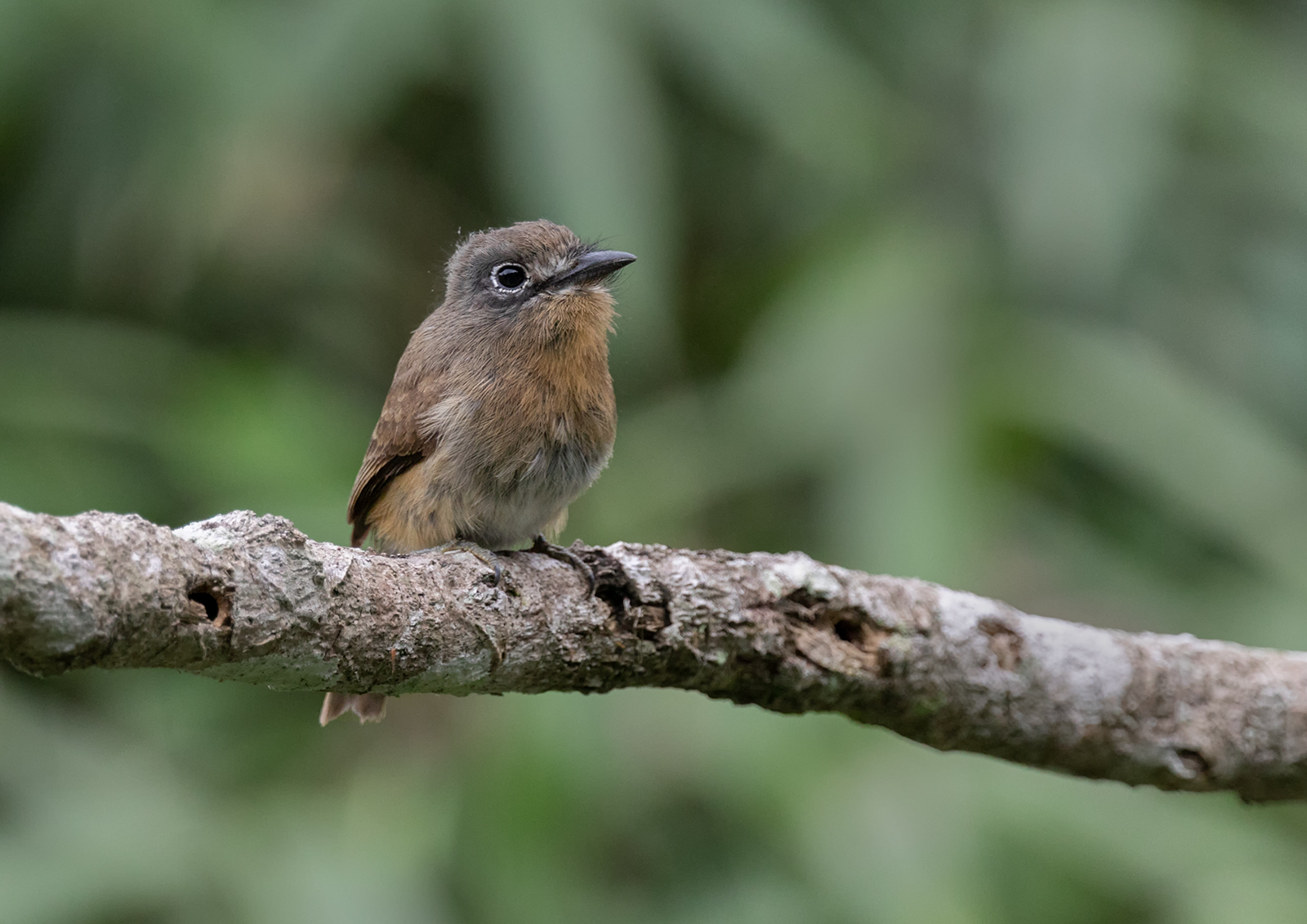

Conservation status
- Least Concern (IUCN 3.1)

Scientific classification
- Kingdom: Animalia
- Phylum: Chordata
- Class: Aves
- Order: Piciformes
- Genus: Nonnula
- Species: N. rubecula

Binomial name
- Nonnula rubecula (Spix, 1824)

= Rusty-breasted nunlet =

Species of bird

The rusty-breasted nunlet (Nonnula rubecula) is a species of bird in the family Bucconidae, the puffbirds, nunlets, and nunbirds. It is found in Argentina, Brazil, Colombia, Ecuador, Guyana, Paraguay, Peru, Suriname, Venezuela, and possibly French Guiana.

== Taxonomy and systematics ==
Taxonomists recognize the seven subspecies of rusty-breasted nunlet listed below. However, the species' taxonomy is unsettled. Some of the subspecies might be species in their own right, some might not be valid at all as separate taxa, and the nominate subspecies might actually represent two subspecies or species.

- N. r. tapanahoniensis Mees (1968)
- N. r. duidae Chapman (1914)
- N. r. interfluvialis Parkes (1970)
- N. r. simulatrix Parkes (1970)
- N. r. cineracea Sclater, PL (1881)
- N. r. simplex Todd (1937)
- N. r. rubecula Spix (1824)

== Description ==
The rusty-breasted nunlet is 14 to 16 cm (5.5 to 6.3 in) long and weighs 17 to 20 g (0.60 to 0.71 oz). The subspecies vary in structure and color from each other. In general, the more northerly subspecies have a longer and narrower bill and a shorter tail than the more southerly ones.

The nominate subspecies has what amounts to two or three color morphs. Some members of it have plain dark gray-brown upperparts and wings. Their lores are rufous and they have a whitish band from the lores that joins a white ring around the eye. Their tail is dark brown. Their throat, breast, and flanks are brown with a reddish tinge and the abdomen is whitish. Other members of the nominate are paler and grayer, especially on the crown, but in the southeast are a darker brown with a warmer brown tail. Some have a bright orange-rufous (instead of brown) throat, breast, and flanks.

N. r. tapanahoniensis has a very gray crown and a cinnamon tinge to the vent. N. r. duidae has a rufous chin. N. r. interfluvialis has a grayer tail and N. r. simulatrix a darker tail than the others. N. r. simplex is drab and dark while N. r. cineracea has warmer brown underparts.

== Distribution and habitat ==
The rusty-breasted nunlet is found in two disjunct areas. The subspecies are distributed thus:

- N. r. tapanahoniensis, the southern Guianas and northern Brazil to the left bank of the lower Amazon River; "hypothetical" in French Guiana
- N. r. duidae, eastern Venezuela north of the Orinoco River
- N. r. interfluvialis, southern Venezuela and northern Brazil between the Orninoco and Negro rivers
- N. r. simulatrix, southeastern Colombia and northwestern Brazil between the Negro and Amazon rivers
- N. r. cineracea, northeastern Ecuador, northeastern Peru, and western Brazil south of the Amazon
- N. r. simplex, northern Brazil south of the lower Amazon
- N. r. rubecula, eastern and southeastern Brazil, eastern Paraguay, and northeastern Argentina

The rusty-breasted nunlet primarily inhabits humid terra firme and várzea forest, and is also found in secondary forest and forest edges. It can be found at any level within the forest but is most often in the midstory. In Venezuela it is usually found in areas of sandy soil; in southeastern Brazil's Paraná state it occurs in gallery forest, and in upper Amazonia it shuns igapó forest.

== Behavior ==
=== Feeding ===
The rusty-breasted nunlet's diet is reported to include large arthropods, both adult and larval. The nunlet occasionally briefly joins mixed-species foraging flocks.

=== Breeding ===
The rusty-breasted nunlet was thought to nest in a burrow, but a 2020 publication revealed that it nests in a shallow scrape on sloping ground that it roofs with twigs and leaves. Over a seven-year period the authors studied 17 nests in Argentina's Misiones Province; they were in various stages of construction and use when discovered. Most clutches were of four eggs though one had three. Both sexes incubated the eggs and brooded and fed the nestlings.

=== Vocalization ===
The rusty-breasted nunlet's song is "a mewing series of 'weeip, weeip, weeip' notes (up to 20) that rise in both pitch and volume". It does not sing often.

== Status ==
The IUCN has assessed the rusty-breasted nunlet as being of Least Concern. It has an extremely large range but its population is unknown and believed to be decreasing. Its apparent density varies from rare to rather common in various parts of the range, though it might be undercounted due to its unobtrusive behavior. It occurs in several protected areas.
