= Sensory =

Sensory may refer to:

== Biology ==
- Sensory ecology, how organisms obtain information about their environment
- Sensory neuron, nerve cell responsible for transmitting information about external stimuli
- Sensory perception, the process of acquiring and interpreting sensory information
- Sensory receptor, a structure that recognizes external stimuli
- Sensory system, part of the nervous system of organisms

== Business and brands ==
- Sensory, Inc., an American speech technology company

== Other uses ==
- Sensory analysis, a consumer product-testing method
- Sensory garden, a self-contained garden area that allows visitors to enjoy a wide variety of sensory experiences
- Sensory play, an act where senses are engaged to increase erotic pleasure
- Sensory: Life on the Spectrum, 2022 anthology about autism

== See also ==
- Sensor
- Sense (disambiguation)
