= Michael Constantinou =

American structural engineer

Michael C. Constantinou
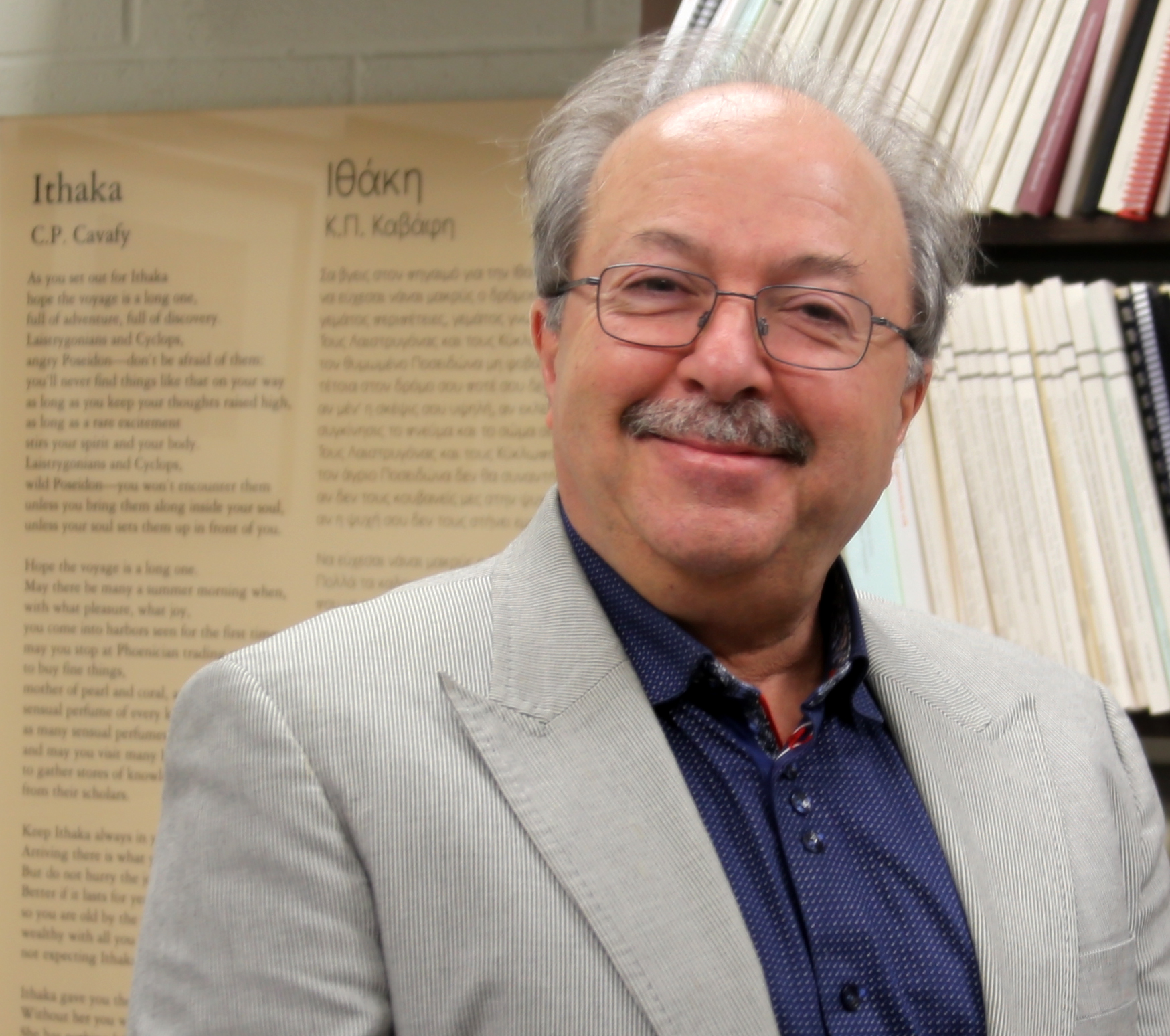
- Born: July 16, 1955 (age 71); Kyrenia, Cyprus
- Citizenship: American
- Education: University of Patras, Rensselaer Polytechnic Institute
- Occupations: Professor, engineer, University at Buffalo
- Known for: Contributions to the development and worldwide application of seismic protective systems and for the development of procedures for the design and analysis of structures with seismic isolation and damping systems.Earthquake Engineering Structural Engineering

Michael C. Constantinou is an American structural engineer who is a Samuel P. Capen Professor and State University of New York Distinguished Professor in the Department of Civil, Structural and Environmental Engineering at the University at Buffalo. He also serves an editor of the Journal of Earthquake Engineering & Structural Dynamics

== Education ==
Constantinou earned a diploma in civil engineering from the University of Patras, Greece in 1980. He received is M.S. in civil engineering in 1981, and his Ph.D. in civil engineering in 1984, both from Rensselaer Polytechnic Institute.

== Research career ==
Constantinou is the inventor of the highly effective energy dissipation apparatus (US Patent 6,438,905), Negative stiffness device and method (US Patent 8,857,110), Negative stiffness device and method (US Patent 9,206,616) and Motion damping system designed for reducing obstruction within open spaces (US Patent 9,580,924).

Constantinou developed the toggle, scissor-jack and open-space damping systems introduced fluidic self-centering systems. He has contributed to the development of standards and guidance related to seismic protective systems, including the National Earthquake Hazards Reduction Program Recommended Provisions, American Society of Civil Engineers (ASCE) Standards 7 and 41, and the American Association of State Highway and Transportation Officials (AASHTO) Guide Specification for Seismic Isolation Design.

== Honors and awards ==
In 2019, Constantinou received an honorary doctorate from the University of Patras, the same University where he received his civil engineering diploma. He was also elected to Fellow status in the American Society of Civil Engineers in October of that year.

He received the Nathan M. Newmark Medal (2015), the Moisseiff Award (2015) and the Walter P. Moore, Jr. Award (2026) from the American Society of Civil Engineers (ASCE).

In 2005, Constantinou received the Charles Pankow Award for Innovation from ASCE and the Civil Engineering Research Foundation. He received the Grand Award from the American Council of Engineering Companies and the New York Association of Consulting Engineering Companies Diamond Award in 2002. In 1994, he received the General Services Administration Design Award. He also received the Presidential Young Investigator Award from the U.S. National Science Foundation in 1988

== Selected papers ==
- Constantinou, M.C.; Mokha, A.M.; Reinhorn, A.M. (1990). "Teflon bearings in base isolation. Part 2. Modeling". Journal of Structural Engineering. 116 (2): 455–474. doi:10.1061/(ASCE)0733-9445(1990)116:2(455).
- Mokha, A.; Constantinou, M.C.; Reinhorn, A.M.; Zayas, V. (1991). "Experimental Study of Friction Pendulum isolation system". Journal of Structural Engineering. 117 (4): 1203–1219. Bibcode:1991JStEn.117.1201M. doi:10.1061/(ASCE)0733-9445(1991)117:4(1201).
- Constantinou, M.C.; Symans, M.D. (1992). Experimental and analytical investigation of seismic response of structures with supplemental fluid viscous dampers. National Center for Earthquake Engineering Research. Report No. NCEER-92-0032.
- Symans, M.D.; Constantinou, M.C. (1997). "Seismic testing of a building structure with a semi-active fluid damper control system". Earthquake Engineering & Structural Dynamics. 26 (7): 759–777. Bibcode:1997EESD...26..759S. doi:10.1002/(SICI)1096-9845(199707)26:7<759::AID-EQE675>3.0.CO;2-E.
- Constantinou, M.C.; Tsopelas, P.; Kasalanati, A.; Wolff, E.D. (1999). Property modification factors for seismic isolation bearings. Multidisciplinary Center for Earthquake Engineering Research. Report No. MCEER-99-0012.
- Fenz, D.; Constantinou, M.C. (2009). "Modelling triple Friction Pendulum bearings for response-history analysis". Earthquake Spectra. 24 (4): 1011–1028. doi:10.1193/1.2982531. S2CID 110208177.
- Kalpakidis, I.V.; Constantinou, M.C. (2009). "Effects of heating on the behavior of lead-rubber bearings. I: Theory". Journal of Structural Engineering. 135 (12): 1440–1449. doi:10.1061/(asce)st.1943-541x.0000072.
- Pasala, D.T.R; Sarlis, A.A.; Nagarajaiah, S.; Reinhorn, A.M.; Constantinou, M.C.; Taylor, D. (2013). "Adaptive negative stiffness: a new structural modification approach for seismic protection". Journal of Structural Engineering. 139 (7): 1112–1123. doi:10.1061/(ASCE)ST.1943-541X.0000615.
- Lee, D.; Constantinou, M.C. (2016). "Quintuple friction pendulum isolator-behavior, modeling and validation". Earthquake Spectra. 32 (3): 1607–1626. Bibcode:2016EarSp..32.1607L. doi:10.1193/040615EQS053M. S2CID 111777480.
- Kitayama, S.; Constantinou, M.C. (2017). "Fluidic self-centering devices as elements of seismically-resistant structures: description, testing, modeling and model validation". Journal of Structural Engineering. 143 (7): 04017050. doi:10.1061/(ASCE)ST.1943-541X.0001787.
- Lee, D.; Constantinou, M.C. (2018). "Combined horizontal-vertical seismic isolation system for high-voltage-power transformers: development, testing and validation". Bulletin of Earthquake Engineering. 16 (9): 4273–4296. doi:10.1007/s10518-018-0494-6. S2CID 115529398.
- Cilsalar, H.; Constantinou, M.C. (2019). "Parametric study of seismic collapse performance of lightweight buildings with spherical deformable rolling isolation". Bulletin of Earthquake Engineering. 18: 1475–1498. doi:10.1007/s10518-019-00753-7.
- Mir, F-U-H; Kaivalya, M.L.; Whittaker, A.S.; Constantinou, M.C. (2022). "Validation of a numerical model of seismically isolated, cylindrical, fluid-filled vessel". Earthquake Engineering & Structural Dynamics. 51 (8): 1771–1961. Bibcode:2022EESD...51.1857M. doi:10.1002/eqe.3642.
- Kim, H-M.; Constantinou, M.C. (2022). "Modeling friction heating effects in triple friction pendulum isolators". Earthquake Engineering & Structural Dynamics. 51 (4): 841–1311. doi:10.1002/eqe.3797.
- Kim, H-M; Constantinou, M.C (2024). "Testing seismic isolators for the effect of maximum earthquake based on measure of cumulative energy". Earthquake Engineering & Structural Dynamics. 53 (12): 3727–3937. Bibcode:2024EESD...53.3924K. doi:10.1002/eqe.4202.
- Lopez Restrepo, S.; Constantinou, M.C. (2025). "Shake table testing of a seismic isolation system for lightweight structures". Earthquake Engineering & Structural Dynamics. 54 (2): 389–767. Bibcode:2025EESD...54..562R. doi:10.1002/eqe.4269.
- Lopez Restrepo, S.; Constantinou, M.C. (2025). "Model development and validation for a seismic isolation system for lightweight structures". Earthquake Engineering & Structural Dynamics. 54 (5): 1311–1493. Bibcode:2025EESD...54.1475R. doi:10.1002/eqe.4321.
