= List of birds of Rocas Atoll =

This list of birds of Rocas Atoll includes species documented on Rocas Atoll, the only atoll in the South Atlantic, which belongs to the state of Rio Grande do Norte. The atoll has been designated an Important Bird Area (IBA) by BirdLife International because it supports significant seabird colonies. The atoll supports no resident landbirds due to its lack of permanent freshwater. The backbone of this list is provided by Avibase, and all additions that differ from this list have citations. As of September 2025, there 30 species have been recorded on the island.

The following tag notes species in this category:

- (A) Accidental - species not regularly occurring on Rocas Atoll

== Rails ==
Order: Gruiformes Family: Rallidae

- Spotted rail (Pardirallus maculatus)

== Sandpipers ==
Order: Charadriiformes Family: Scolopacidae

- Bar-tailed godwit (Limosa lapponica) (A)

== Pratincoles ==
Order: Charadriiformes Family: Glareolidae

- Collared pratincole (Glareola pratincola) (A)

== Gulls, terns, and skimmers ==
Order: Charadriiformes Family: Laridae

- White tern (Gygis alba)
- Brown noddy (Anous stolidus)
- Black noddy (Anous minutus)
- Sooty tern (Onychoprion fuscatus)

== Tropicbirds ==
Order: Phaethontiformes Family: Phaethontidae

- White-tailed tropicbird (Phaethon lepturus)
- Red-billed tropicbird (Phaethon aethereus)

== Southern storm petrels ==
Order: Procellariiformes Family: Oceanitidae

- Wilson's storm-petrel (Oceanites oceanicus)

== Northern storm petrels ==
Order: Procellariiformes Family: Hydrobatidae

- Leach's storm-petrel (Hydrobates leucorhous)

== Petrels and shearwaters ==
Order: Procellariiformes Family: Procellariidae

- Trindade petrel (Pterodroma arminjoniana)
- Cory's shearwater (Calonectris diomedea)
- Great shearwater (Ardenna gravis)
- Sooty shearwater (Ardenna grisea)
- Manx shearwater (Puffinus puffinus)
- Sargasso shearwater (Puffinus lherminieri)

== Frigatebirds ==
Order: Pelecaniformes Family: Fregatidae

- Magnificent frigatebird (Fregata magnificens)

== Boobies and gannets ==
Order: Pelecaniformes Family: Sulidae

- Red-footed booby (Sula sula)
- Brown booby (Sula leucogaster)
- Masked booby (Sula dactylatra)

== Herons and egrets ==
Order: Pelecaniformes Family: Ardeidae

- Western cattle egret (Ardea ibis) (A)

== Ospreys ==
Order: Accipitriformes Family: Pandionidae

- Osprey (Pandion haliaetus)

== Hawks, kites, and eagles ==
Order: Accipitriformes Family: Accipitridae

- White-tailed kite (Elanus leucurus)

== Tyrant flycatchers ==
Order: Passeriformes Family: Tyrannidae

- White-rumped monjita (Xolmis velatus)
- Noronha elaenia (Elaenia ridleyana) (A)

== Old World sparrows ==
Order: Passeriformes Family: Passeridae

- House sparrow (Passer domesticus) (I)
