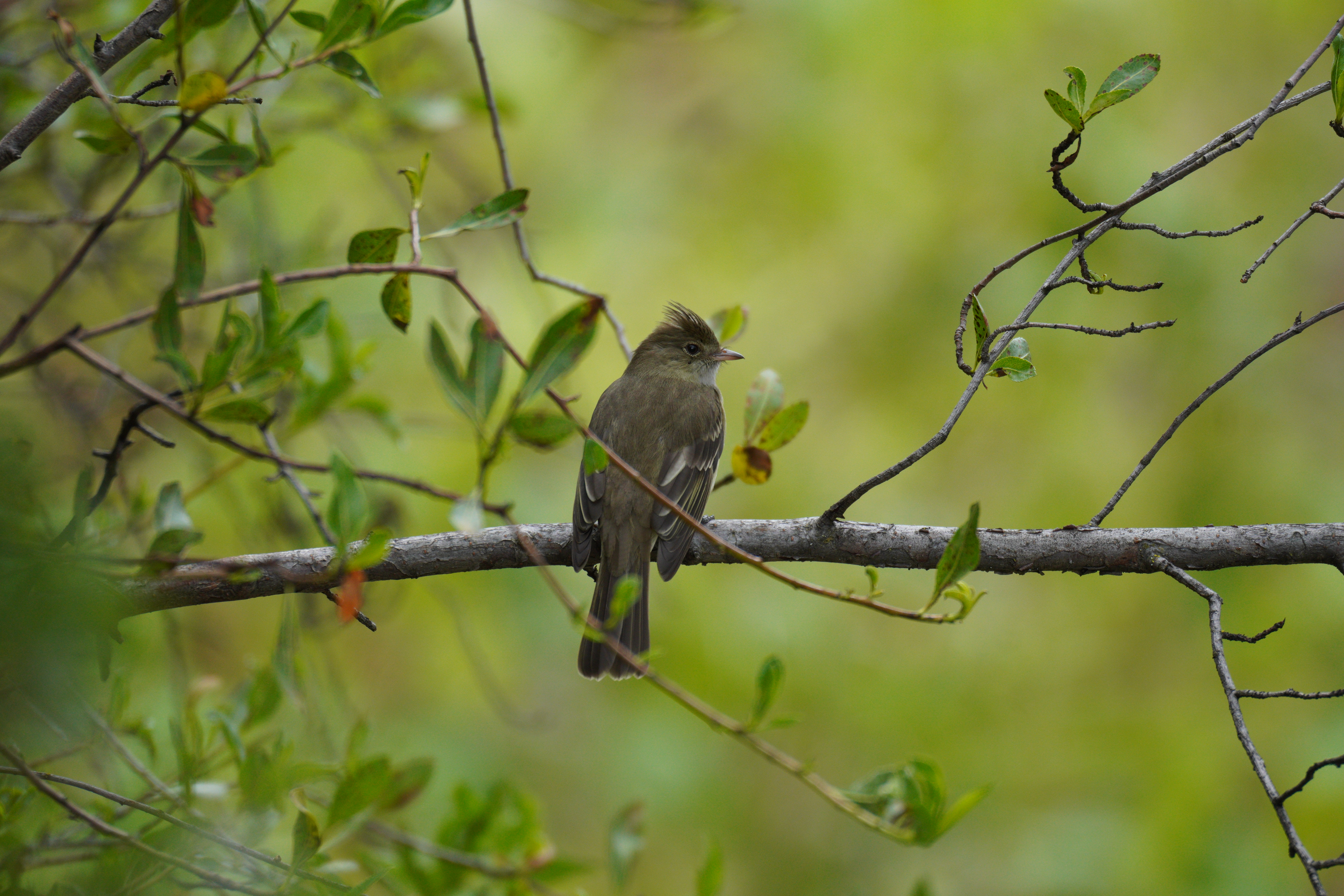

Conservation status
- Least Concern (IUCN 3.1)

Scientific classification
- Kingdom: Animalia
- Phylum: Chordata
- Class: Aves
- Order: Passeriformes
- Family: Tyrannidae
- Genus: Elaenia
- Species: E. albiceps

Binomial name
- Elaenia albiceps (D'Orbigny & Lafresnaye, 1837)

Subspecies
- See text

= White-crested elaenia =

Species of bird

The white-crested elaenia (Elaenia albiceps) is a species of bird in subfamily Elaeniinae of family Tyrannidae, the tyrant flycatchers. It is found in Bolivia, Chile, Colombia, Ecuador, and Peru.

== Taxonomy ==
The white-crested elaenia was formally described in 1837 as Muscipeta albiceps by the French naturalists Alcide d'Orbigny and Frédéric de Lafresnaye. They noted that the species occurred in Rio de Janeiro in Brazil, the Yungas region in Bolivia and the Tacna region of Peru. In 1925 the Austrian ornithologist Carl Eduard Hellmayr restricted the type locality to the Yungas region in Bolivia based on the provenance of the type species. The specific epithet albiceps combines the Latin albus meaning "white" with -ceps meaning "-headed". The white-crested elaenia is now placed in the genus Elaenia that was introduced in 1836 by the Swedish zoologist Carl Jakob Sundevall.

Six subspecies are recognised:

- E. a. griseigularis Sclater, PL, 1859 – Andes of southwestern Colombia (Nariño) to Ecuador and northwestern Peru
- E. a. diversa Zimmer, JT, 1941 – central Andes of Peru (Cajamarca to Huánuco)
- E. a. urubambae Zimmer, JT, 1941 – subtropical southeastern Peru (Cusco)
- E. a. albiceps (d'Orbigny, ACVMD & de Lafresnaye, NFAA, 1837) – far southeastern Peru (Department of Puno) and northwestern Bolivia
- E. a. modesta Tschudi, JJ, 1844 – arid tropical western Peru (La Libertad) to northwestern Chile
- E. a. chilensis Hellmayr, CE, 1927 – breeds Andes of Bolivia to Tierra del Fuego; winters northward to Brazil

The subspecies E. a. chilensis has sometimes been considered as a separate species, the Chilean elaenia. Genetic studies have found the Sierran elaenia (Elaenia pallatangae) is embedded within the white-crested elaenia complex with E. pallatangae closely related to E. a. chilensis, despite the vocal differences. The species limits within the albiceps-pallatangae complex are unresolved.

== Description ==
The white-crested elaenia is 13.5 to 15 cm (5.3 to 5.9 in) long and weighs 12.5 to 24.2 g (0.44 to 0.85 oz). It is a small to medium size elaenia with a small bushy crest. The sexes have the same plumage. Adults of the nominate subspecies E. a. albiceps have a mostly dull olive to olive-gray head with a partially hidden white or creamy white stripe in the middle of the crest. They have whitish lores and eyering. Their upperparts are dull olive to olive-gray. Their wings are dusky with white or whitish tips on the coverts that show as two wing bars. Their flight feathers have narrow whitish or yellowish edges with dusky bases on the inner pairs. Their tail is dusky with narrow olive edges to the feathers. Their throat is light gray or whitish gray, their breast light gray or grayish brown, and their belly and undertail coverts whitish.

The other subspecies of the white-crested elaenia differ from the nominate and each other thus:

- E. a. griseigularis: paler upperparts than nominate, with less white on a shorter crest and a less distinct eyering
- E. a. diversa: like griseigularis with a whiter throat, less distinct wing bars, and more contrast between the flanks and belly
- E. a. urubambae: paler upperparts than nominate with paler lores, less prominent eyering, duller wing bars, and a pale yellow wash on the belly
- E. a. modesta: duller overall than nominate, with no distinct lores and eyering contrast, less distinct wing bars, and pale edges on the inner flight feathers extending through what is dusky on the nominate

Both sexes of all subspecies have a dark brown iris, a black or dark gray bill with a pale base to the mandible, and black or dark gray legs and feet.

== Distribution and habitat ==
Elaenias listed as white-crested by the SACC have been recorded as vagrants on the Falkland Islands but without subspecies identification, so they could have been what the IOC but not the SACC recognizes as the Chilean elaenia. The Chilean elaenia is highly migratory.

The white-crested elaenia's habitat has been studied for all subspecies except E. a. modesta, and it is assumed to have similar requirements to the others. They inhabit the edges of subtropical and temperate forest, the interior of more open woodlands and secondary forest, and scrublands. In many areas the species favors intermontane valleys that are drier than the slopes above. In elevation it ranges up to 3,200 m (10,500 ft) in Colombia, between 1,500 and 2,800 m (4,900 and 9,200 ft) in Ecuador, and between 800 and 3,500 m (2,600 and 11,500 ft) on the west slope and 1,000 and 3,300 m (3,300 and 10,800 ft) on the east slope in Peru.

== Behavior ==
=== Movement ===
Subspecies E. a. modesta breeds west of the Andean crest and moves to the east side of the range for the austral winter. Flocks of up to 100 have been reported during migration, but as is the case with vagrants to the Falklands they could have been the highly migratory Chilean elaenias. The other subspecies are year-round residents.

=== Feeding ===
The white-crested elaenia's diet has not been detailed but is known to include insects and fruit. It typically forages singly. It sometimes joins mixed-species feeding flocks, and often feeds at fruiting trees with individuals of its own and other species. It captures prey and plucks fruit by gleaning while perched and while briefly hovering.

=== Breeding ===
Subspecies E. a. modesta apparently mostly breeds between December and February; the breeding seasons of the other subspecies are not known. Nothing else is known about the species' breeding biology.

=== Other ===
The oldest known white-crested elaenia from banding studies was eight years and two months old, though it is uncertain whether this represents the maximum potential longevity of the species.

=== Vocalization ===
The white-crested elaenia's vocalizations apparently differ somewhat among the subspecies, though not all have been studied in detail. The dawn song of E. a. griseigularis is "a series of deep, burry, falling-rising djeewee notes interspersed with occasional per'brr'djwee notes" and its calls are "a low, rich, modulated djur and a longer, descending djeeer". The dawn song of E. a. albiceps is "a series of burry rising-falling-rising djww'awee notes interspersed with an occasional purt trr'cheewee". Its call are "a burry, sneezing whi'bur and a descending, burry wheer". The song of E. a. modesta has not been described; its call is "a pure, descending peeur".

== Status ==
The IUCN follows HBW taxonomy and so has included the Chilean elaenia in its assessment of the white-crested. The species together are assessed as being of Least Concern, with an unknown population size that is believed to be stable. No immediate threats have been identified. "A species that occupies forest edge and second-growth, it is likely that this species is relatively tolerant of habitat disturbance."
