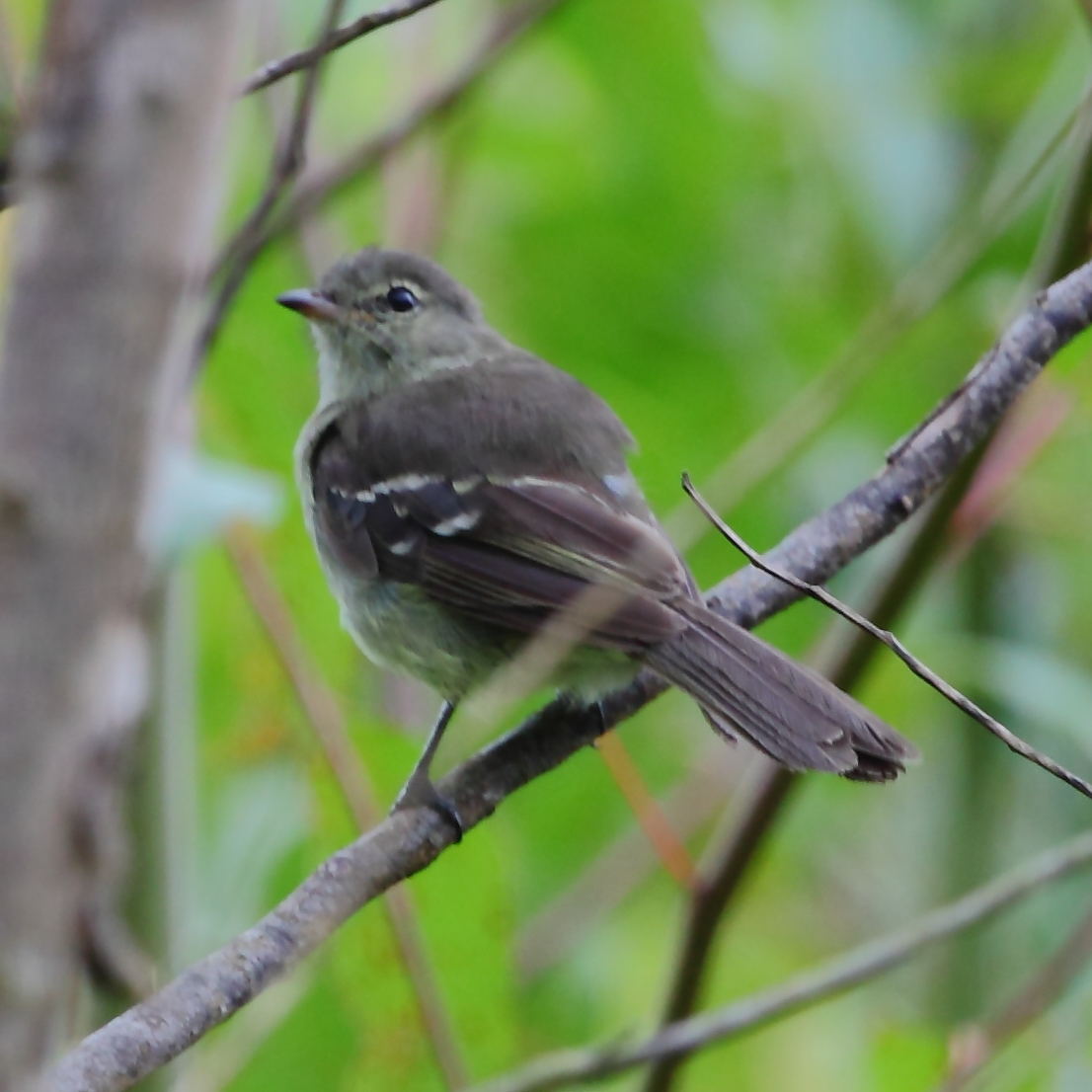
- at Serra do Mar State Park, São Luiz do Paraitinga, São Paulo state, Brazil

Conservation status
- Least Concern (IUCN 3.1)

Scientific classification
- Kingdom: Animalia
- Phylum: Chordata
- Class: Aves
- Order: Passeriformes
- Family: Tyrannidae
- Genus: Elaenia
- Species: E. sordida

Binomial name
- Elaenia sordida Zimmer, 1941

Synonyms
- Elaenia obscura sordida

= Small-headed elaenia =

Species of bird

The small-headed elaenia (Elaenia sordida), also known as the Brazilian elaenia, is a species of bird in subfamily Elaeniinae of family Tyrannidae, the tyrant flycatchers. It is found in Argentina, Brazil, Paraguay, and Uruguay.

== Taxonomy and systematics ==
The small-headed elaenia is monotypic. It was previously treated as a subspecies of the highland elaenia (E. obscura); between 2016 and 2020 taxonomic systems split the two.

== Description ==
The small-headed elaenia is 16 to 20 cm (6.3 to 7.9 in) long and weighs 24 to 34.5 g (0.85 to 1.2 oz). It is a large elaenia without a crest. The sexes have the same plumage. Adults have a dark olive head with lighter cheeks, a dusky loral spot, and a thin whitish eyering. Their upperparts are dark olive. Their wings are mostly dusky with pale edges on the flight feathers. The tips of their wing coverts are whitish to yellowish and show as two bars on the closed wing. Their tail is dusky with white tips on unworn feathers. Their chin and throat are grayish yellow, their breast and flanks dull gray-olive, and their belly and undertail coverts grayish yellow. Both sexes have a brown iris, a stubby blackish brown to black bill with a pinkish base to the mandible, and brown to black legs and feet. Juveniles have dark rufescent brown upperparts and dirty grayish white underparts.

== Distribution and habitat ==
The small-headed elaenia is found in Brazil locally in Bahia and from southern Mato Grosso do Sul and Minas Gerais south into extreme northern Uruguay and west into eastern Paraguay and northeastern Argentina. It inhabits the undergrowth and edges of humid subtropical and temperate forest, secondary forest, and coastal restinga. It also inhabits forest fragments and patches of young secondary forest. In elevation it occurs between 2,150 and 3,000 m (7,100 and 9,800 ft) in Brazil.

== Behavior ==
=== Movement ===
The small-headed elaenia appears to be a year-round resident in most of its range though it might be present in Uruguay only during the breeding season.

=== Feeding ===
The small-headed elaenia feeds on insects and fruit. Like its former "parent" the highland elaenia, it primarily forages near the top of the forest canopy but tends to remain hidden. It finds food by gleaning while perched, while briefly hovering, and with short upward sallies to take insects in mid-air.

=== Breeding ===
The small-headed elaenia's breeding season has not been fully defined but appears to include at least October to February. Its one known nest was a cup made of grass and placed in a vertical fork in a shrub about 1.2 m (4 ft) above the ground. it contained two eggs that were white to pinkish with cinnamon markings. The incubation period, time to fledging, and details of parental care are not known.

=== Vocalization ===
The small-headed elaenia's song is a "high, melodious 'the-weedrr-wee-der-wee' " and its call a "nasal 'rrree' ".

== Status ==
The IUCN has assessed the small-headed elaenia as being of Least Concern. It has a large range; its population size is not known and is believed to be stable. No immediate threats have been identified. It is rare (e.g. in Paraguay) to fairly common but local. It occurs in several protected areas in Brazil. It "[a]ccepts rather disturbed habitats, as well as fragmented habitats".
