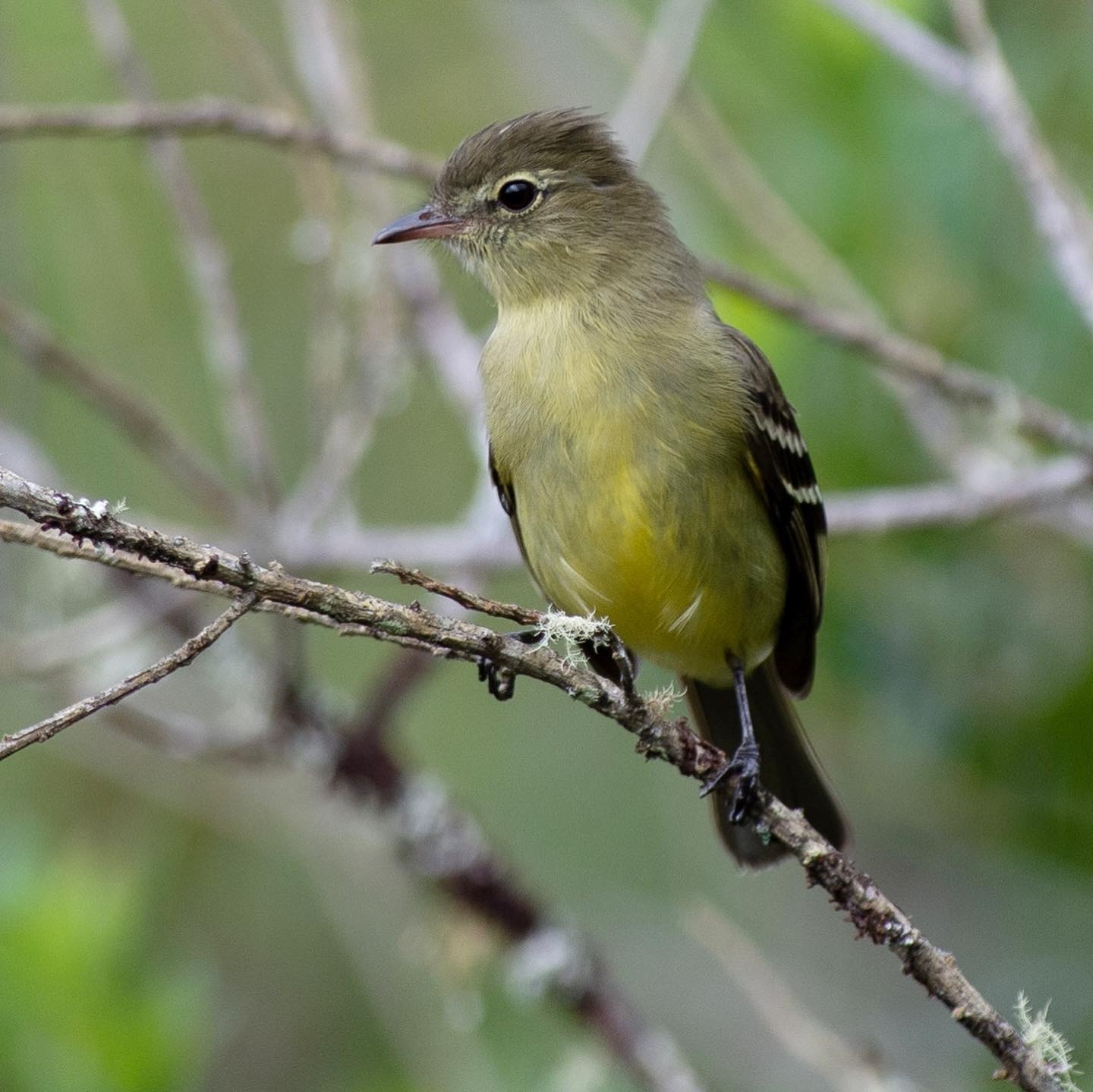

Conservation status
- Least Concern (IUCN 3.1)

Scientific classification
- Kingdom: Animalia
- Phylum: Chordata
- Class: Aves
- Order: Passeriformes
- Family: Tyrannidae
- Genus: Elaenia
- Species: E. olivina

Binomial name
- Elaenia olivina Salvin & Godman, 1884

Synonyms
- Elainea olivina (protonym)

= Tepui elaenia =

Species of bird

The tepui elaenia (Elaenia olivina) is a species of bird in subfamily Elaeniinae of family Tyrannidae, the tyrant flycatchers. It is found in Brazil, Guyana, and Venezuela.

== Taxonomy and systematics ==
The tepui elaenia has two subspecies, the nominate E. o. olivina (Salvin & Godman, 1884) and E. o. davidwillardi (Dickerman & Phelps, WH Jr, 1987). For much of the twentieth century the nominate was treated as a subspecies of the sierran elaenia (E. pallatangae). It (with subspecies E. o. davidwillardi) were not recognized as a separate species until about 2008 after which taxonomic systems made the change.

== Description ==
The tepui elaenia is about 14.5 to 15 cm (5.7 to 5.9 in) long and weighs about 15 to 20 g (0.53 to 0.71 oz). It is a small elaenia with a very small crest. The sexes have the same plumage. Adults of the nominate subspecies have a dark olive-brown head with lighter cheeks, a thin yellowish white eyering, and a thin white strip in the center of the crown. Their upperparts are dark olive-brown. Their wings are mostly dark olive-brown with whitish or yellowish edges on the flight feathers. The tips of their wing coverts are whitish and show as two bars on the closed wing. Their tail is dark olive-brown. Their underparts are mostly yellowish with a strong olive wash on the throat, breast, and flanks and an unmarked yellow belly. Subspecies E. o. davidwillardi has darker olive-brown upperparts and brighter underparts than the nominate. Both sexes of both subspecies have a dark brown iris, a black bill with a pinkish base to the mandible, and black legs and feet.

== Distribution and habitat ==
The tepui elaenia is a bird of the tepui region where southeastern and southern Venezuela, far northwestern Brazil, and western Guyana meet. It has a disjunct distribution. The nominate subspecies is found on tepuis in all three countries of the border region. Subspecies E. o. davidwillardi is found only on Cerro de la Neblina in extreme southern Amazonas state of Venezuela. The species primarily inhabits scrubby edges and rocky openings in humid montane forest. It also occurs in secondary forest, especially sites dominated by Melastomataceae. In elevation it ranges between 1,500 and 3,000 m (4,900 and 9,800 ft) in Brazil and between 950 and 2,400 m (3,100 and 7,900 ft) in Venezuela.

== Behavior ==
=== Movement ===
The tepui elaenia is a year-round resident throughout its range.

=== Feeding ===
The tepui elaenia feeds on insects and small fruits, especially those of Melastomataceae. It forages at all levels of the forest and often joins mixed-species feeding flocks. It finds food by mostly by gleaning while perched.

=== Breeding ===
The tepui elaenia's breeding season has not been established but includes at least January to April in Venezuela. Nothing else is known about the species' breeding biology.

=== Vocalization ===
The tepui elaenia's vocalizations are not well known. As of late 2024 xeno-canto had only eight recordings of the nominate subspecies and none of subspecies E. o. davidwillardi. At that time the Cornell Lab of Ornithology's Macaulay Library had a larger number of recordings of the nominate but also none of davidwillardi. What is thought to be the nominate's day song is "irregular sharp notes, e.g. 'chi-tree-trew...tree-trew...chip...' and its call "a 'pfeééu' ".

== Status ==
The IUCN has assessed the tepui elaenia as being of Least Concern. Its population size is not known and is believed to be stable. No immediate threats have been identified. It is known from only a few sites in Brazil and Guyana but is considered fairly common in Venezuela. Subspecies E. o. davidwillardi is considered common on its single tepui.
