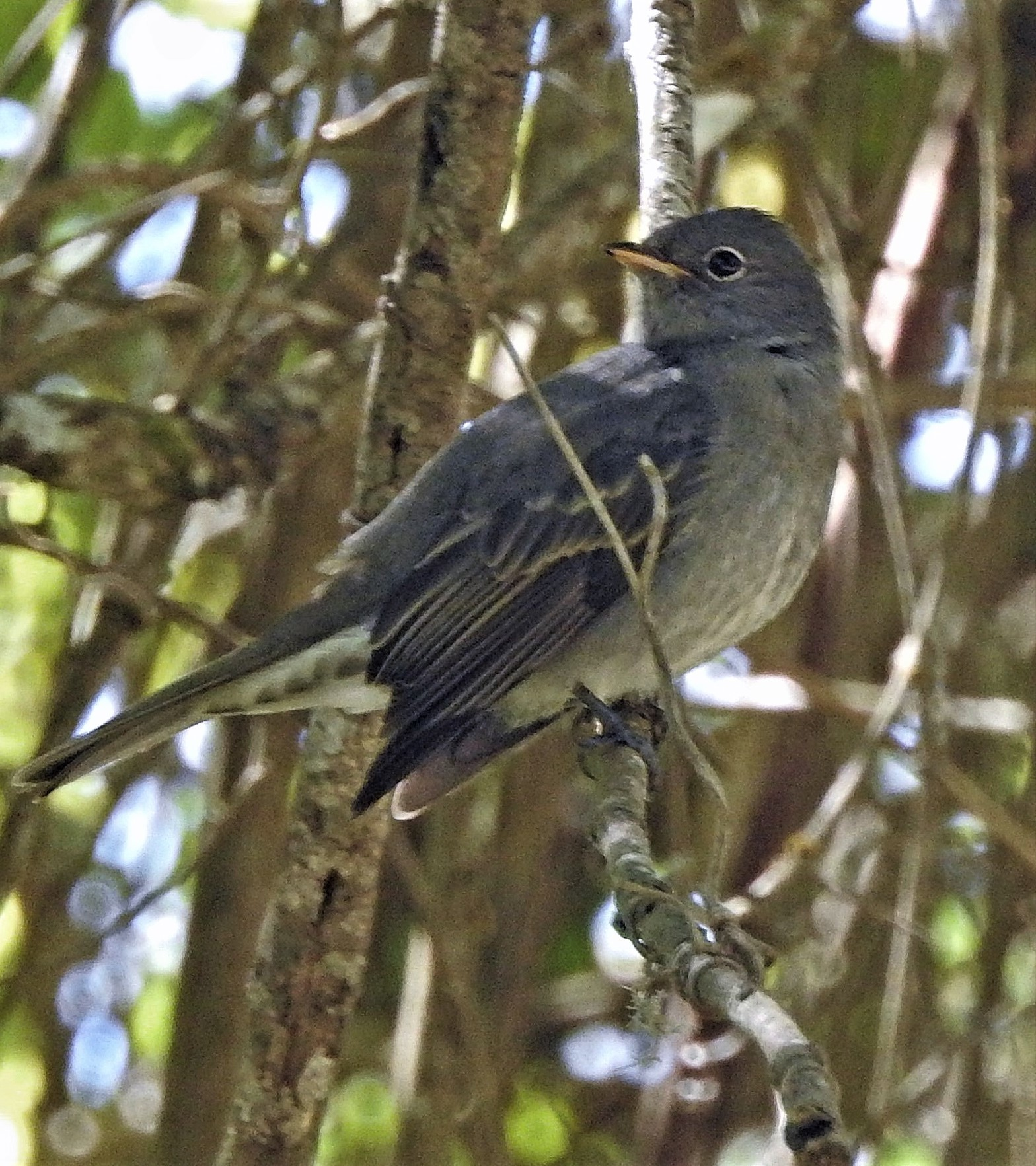

Conservation status
- Least Concern (IUCN 3.1)

Scientific classification
- Kingdom: Animalia
- Phylum: Chordata
- Class: Aves
- Order: Passeriformes
- Family: Tyrannidae
- Genus: Elaenia
- Species: E. strepera

Binomial name
- Elaenia strepera Cabanis, 1883

= Slaty elaenia =

Species of bird

The slaty elaenia (Elaenia strepera) is a species of bird in subfamily Elaeniinae of family Tyrannidae, the tyrant flycatchers. It is found in Argentina, Bolivia, Colombia, Peru, and Venezuela, and as a vagrant in Ecuador and on Trinidad.

== Taxonomy and systematics ==
The slaty elaenia is monotypic.

== Description ==
The slaty elaenia is 15 to 16 cm (5.9 to 6.3 in) long and weighs 18 to 20 g (0.63 to 0.71 oz). It is a small elaenia with a slight crest. Adult males have a slate-gray head with slightly paler cheeks, a thin white eyering, and a partially concealed white patch in the middle of the crown. Their upperparts are slate-gray. Their wings are mostly dusky gray; they are slightly paler on the edges of the flight feathers and the tips of the coverts. The latter show as two very faint bars on the closed wing. Their tail is dusky. Their throat is whitish to pale gray, their breast and flanks gray, and their belly and undertail coverts whitish. Adult females have an olive wash on their upperparts, more prominent and ochraceous-tinged wing bars than the male, an olive-gray throat and breast, and a yellowish white belly. Both sexes have a dark brown iris, a flat, wide, black bill with a dull orangish base to the mandible, and black legs and feet.

== Distribution and habitat ==
The slaty elaenia breeds on the eastern slope of the Andes from western Santa Cruz Department in Bolivia south into northwestern Argentina as far as La Rioja Province. Following the breeding season in migrates north through eastern Peru into southeastern Colombia and eastern Venezuela. It has appeared as a vagrant during migration in eastern Ecuador and as an "overshoot" vagrant on Trinidad. There are no confirmed records in Brazil.

During the breeding season the slaty elaenia inhabits somewhat open woodlands and the edges of denser forest, often along watercourses. In this period it ranges in elevation between 500 and 2,000 m (1,640 and 6,562 ft). It is believed to use the same types of habitat during its passage through Peru. In Colombia and Venezuela it also occurs mostly on forest edges and somewhat open landscapes. In Venezuela it reaches an elevation of 900 m (3,000 ft).

== Behavior ==
=== Movement ===
As noted above, the slaty elaenia is a complete migrant, leaving its breeding range to winter in northern South America.

=== Feeding ===
The slaty elaenia feeds on insects and small fruits. It usually forages singly or in pairs; on its wintering grounds it infrequently joins mixed-species feeding flocks. It captures prey and plucks fruit by gleaning while perched and while briefly hovering, and also captures flying insects on the wing.

=== Breeding ===
The slaty elaenia breeds between October and February. Its nest is cup made of small twigs and leaves and is typically placed in the fork of a branch about 5 m (15 ft) above the ground. The clutch is two eggs. The incubation period, time to fledging, and details of parental care are not known.

=== Vocalization ===
The slaty elaenia is vocal only in its breeding range. Its primary call is "a dry, gravelly 'eh-eh-ehhhhhh' " that is unlike that of other elaenias; it has been likened to a frog's or locust's sounds.

== Status ==
The IUCN has assessed the slaty elaenia as being of Least Concern. It has a large range; its population size is not known and is believed to be decreasing. No immediate threats have been identified. It is considered locally common in its breeding range, rare in Peru and uncommon in Colombia, and is known from only a few records in Venezuela. It occurs in national parks in Argentina, along its migration route, and in its wintering range. "Although the Yungas in La Paz and Cochabamba (Bolivia) are still 90% intact, c. 60% of forests of the Boliviano-Tucumano semi-evergreen zone of S Bolivia and Argentina have been cleared or heavily disturbed, mainly for pasture; large areas in Bolivia also degraded or lost owing to logging, agricultural conversion, colonization and road-building."
