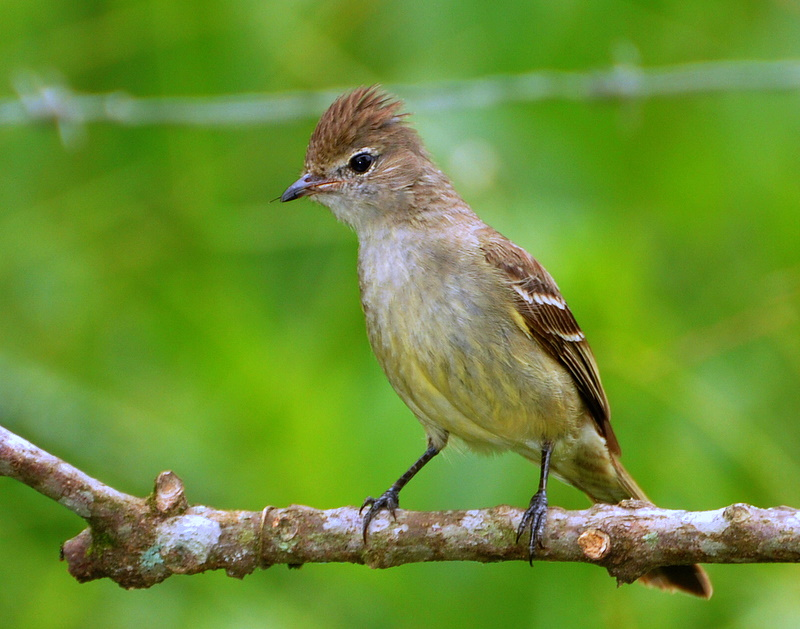
- Yellow-bellied elaenia (Elaenia flavogaster)

Scientific classification
- Kingdom: Animalia
- Phylum: Chordata
- Class: Aves
- Order: Passeriformes
- Family: Tyrannidae
- Genus: Elaenia; Sundevall, 1836

Type species
- Muscicapa pagana = Pipra flavogaster Sundevall, 1836

Species
- see text

= Elaenia =

Genus of birds

Elaenia is a genus of passerine birds in the tyrant flycatcher family which occur in Mexico, the Caribbean, and Central and South America. Except by voice, specific identification is often difficult since many species are very similar. They are also known by the common name elaenia, which they share with the similar tyrant flycatchers of the genus Myiopagis.

Elaenia flycatchers are typically brownish, greyish or olive above, and off-white and/or pale yellow on the belly, with a white or pale yellowish eye-ring of variable strength and two or three wing bars. Some species show a crest; often with a semi-concealed white patch/streak.

== Taxonomy ==
The genus Elaenia was introduced by the Swedish zoologist Carl Jakob Sundevall in 1836. The type species was subsequently designated as the yellow-bellied elaenia. The name of the genus is from the Ancient Greek ελαινεος elaineos "of olive-oil" or "oleaginous".

The genus contains 22 species:

Image	Scientific name	Common name	Distribution
	Yellow-bellied elaenia	Elaenia flavogaster	Central and South America as far as northern Argentina, and on Trinidad and Tobago.
	Caribbean elaenia	Elaenia martinica	West Indies and parts of Central America.
	Large elaenia	Elaenia spectabilis	western Amazonia to eastern Brazil and central Bolivia.
	Noronha elaenia	Elaenia ridleyana	Fernando de Noronha
	White-crested elaenia	Elaenia albiceps	Peru, Ecuador, Bolivia, and northernmost Chile.
	Small-billed elaenia	Elaenia parvirostris	Paraguay and neighbouring regions winters to northern half of South America
	Olivaceous elaenia	Elaenia mesoleuca	Argentina, Brazil, Paraguay, and Uruguay.
	Slaty elaenia	Elaenia strepera	western Amazon Basin, Colombia and Venezuela.
	Mottle-backed elaenia	Elaenia gigas	Bolivia, Colombia, Ecuador, and Peru.
	Brownish elaenia	Elaenia pelzelni	Brazil, Peru, Colombia, and Bolivia.
	Plain-crested elaenia	Elaenia cristata	Bolivia, Brazil, Colombia, French Guiana, Guyana, Peru, Suriname, and Venezuela.
	Lesser elaenia	Elaenia chiriquensis	northern half of South America
	Coopmans's elaenia	Elaenia brachyptera	southwestern Colombia and northwestern Ecuador
	Rufous-crowned elaenia	Elaenia ruficeps	Brazil, Colombia, French Guiana, Guyana, Suriname, and Venezuela
	Mountain elaenia	Elaenia frantzii	Guatemala to Colombia and western Venezuela
	Highland elaenia	Elaenia obscura	southeastern Ecuador to Bolivia and northwestern Argentina
	Small-headed elaenia	Elaenia sordida	southeastern Brazil, eastern Paraguay, and northeastern Argentina
	Great elaenia	Elaenia dayi	Venezuela and far northern Brazil, and may also occur in Guyana.
	Sierran elaenia	Elaenia pallatangae	Bolivia, Brazil, Colombia, Ecuador, Guyana, Peru, and Venezuela
	Tepui elaenia	Elaenia olivina	Guyana and Venezuela
	Blue Mountain elaenia	Elaenia fallax	montane forest of Jamaica
	Hispaniolan elaenia	Elaenia cherriei	montane forest of Hispaniola

== See also ==
- Myiopagis, another genus of tyrant flycatchers commonly known as elaenias
