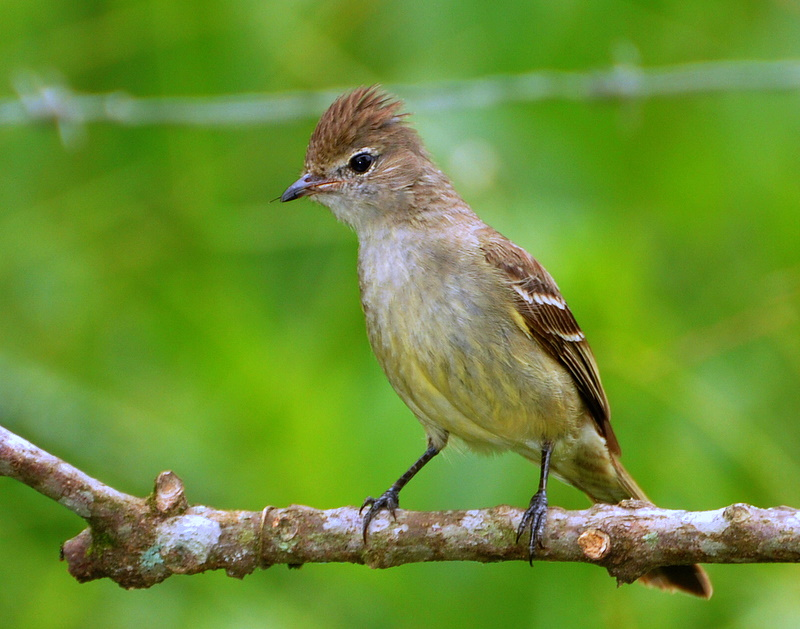
- At Registro, São Paulo State, Brazil

Conservation status
- Least Concern (IUCN 3.1)

Scientific classification
- Kingdom: Animalia
- Phylum: Chordata
- Class: Aves
- Order: Passeriformes
- Family: Tyrannidae
- Genus: Elaenia
- Species: E. flavogaster

Binomial name
- Elaenia flavogaster (Thunberg, 1822)

Subspecies
- see text

= Yellow-bellied elaenia =

Species of bird

The yellow-bellied elaenia (Elaenia flavogaster) is a small bird in subfamily Elaeniinae of family Tyrannidae, the tyrant flycatchers. It is found in Mexico, in every Central American country, in every mainland South American country except Chile, on Trinidad and Tobago, and on several islands in the Lesser Antilles.

== Taxomomy and systematics ==
The yellow-bellied elaenia was formally described in 1822 by the Swedish naturalist Carl Peter Thunberg under the binomial name Pipra flavogaster. The type locality is Rio de Janeiro in Brazil. The yellow-bellied elaenia is now one of 22 species placed in the genus Elaenia that was introduced in 1836 by Carl Jakob Sundevall. The specific epithet flavogaster combines the Latin flavus meaning "yellow" or "golden-yellow" with gaster meaning "belly".

Four subspecies are recognised:

- E. f. subpagana Sclater, PL, 1860
- E. f. pallididorsalis Aldrich, 1937
- E. f. flavogaster (Thunberg, 1822)
- E. f. semipagana Sclater, PL, 1862

In the mid twentieth century at least one author treated the yellow-bellied elaenia and the large elaenia (E. spectabilis) as conspecific.

== Description ==
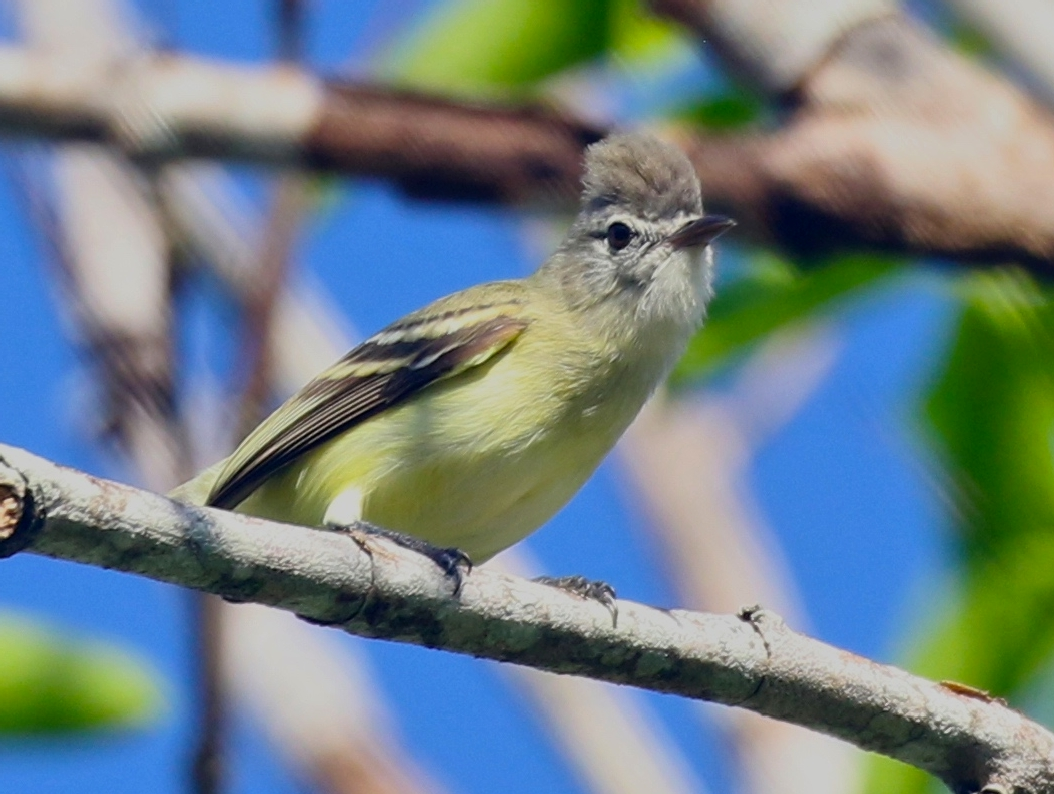
Yellow-bellied elaenia in Antón, Panama

The yellow-bellied elaenia is 15 to 17 cm (5.9 to 6.7 in) long and weighs 21 to 29 g (0.74 to 1.0 oz). It is medium-sized, has a small head, and a bushy crest. The sexes have the same plumage. Adults of the nominate subspecies E. f. flavogaster have a brownish olive crown with a partially concealed white stripe in the middle of the crest. They have whitish lores and a faint whitish eyering on an otherwise pale brownish olive face. Their upperparts are brownish olive. Their wings are slightly duskier than the back with yellowish white edges on the flight feathers and tips on the coverts; the latter show as two wing bars. Their tail is also slightly duskier than the back. Their throat is pale gray, their breast olive gray, and their belly yellow to pale yellow to whitish.

Subspecies E. f. subpagana has browner olive upperparts and yellower underparts than the nominate. E. f. pallididorsalis is overall grayer and has slightly greener upperparts than the nominate. E. f. semipagana is paler overall than the nominate, with a grayer face, less white on the crest, a whiter throat, and a paler belly. Both sexes of all subspecies have a dark brown iris, a black bill with a paler base to the mandible, and black legs and feet.

== Distribution and habitat ==
The subspecies of the yellow-bellied elaenia are found thus:

- E. f. subpagana: from southern Veracruz and the Yucatán Peninsula in southeastern Mexico south through Belize, Guatemala, El Salvador, Honduras, and Nicaragua into Costa Rica; also on Isla Mujeres off Quintana Roo, Mexico, and Coiba Island, Panama
- E. f. pallididorsalis: Panama and adjacent islands except Coiba
- E. f. flavogaster: the northern half of Colombia; most of Venezuela including Margarita and Patos islands; Trinidad; Tobago; St. Vincent, the Grenadines, and Grenada in the Lesser Antilles; the Guianas; Brazil except western and central Amazonas; southeastern Peru; the northern half of Bolivia; eastern Paraguay; and northeastern and northwestern Argentina (and also as a vagrant to Uruguay)
- E. f. semipagana: extreme southwestern Colombia, Ecuador west of the Andes including Puná Island, Tumbes Department in extreme northwestern Peru, and intermittently through Peru on the east side of the Andes

The yellow-bellied elaenia inhabits a variety of habitats. They span from arid to humid and nearly all are at most lightly wooded. It shuns dense forest except at its edges. Its habitats include savanna, scrublands, semi-open woodlands, secondary forest, brushy areas along watercourses, clearings with scattered trees, suburban parks with trees, and gardens. In elevation it reaches 2,000 m (6,600 ft) in Mexico, 1,700 m (5,600 ft) in northern Central America, 2,200 m (7,200 ft) in Costa Rica, 2,400 m (7,900 ft) in Colombia, 1,300 m (4,300 ft) in Ecuador, 1,500 m (4,900 ft) in Peru, 1,750 m (5,700 ft) in Venezuela, and 1,500 m (4,900 ft) in Brazil.

== Behavior ==
=== Movement ===
The yellow-bellied elaenia is a year-round resident in almost all of its range. Most of the population of Veracruz and Oaxaca in Mexico move south of the Isthmus of Tehuantepec in winter.

=== Feeding ===
The yellow-bellied elaenia feeds on insects and berries. Though it usually forages singly or in pairs, several may gather in a fruiting tree. It forages mostly in the lower to middle levels of its habitat. It captures prey and plucks fruit by gleaning while perched and while hovering and with aerial sallies. It occasionally joins mixed-species feeding flocks.

=== Breeding ===
The yellow-bellied elaenia's breeding season varies geographically, but with most of them being within the span of February to September. Breeding activity has been noted on Trinidad and Tobago in November and December though most breeding there occurs between April and June. Its nest is a cup made of moss and grass with lichens and bark on the outside and lined with feathers. It is typically placed in a fork of a small branch. The usual clutch is two eggs though clutches of one and three have been noted. The eggs are pinkish white with chestnut and gray markings. The female alone incubates the clutch. The incubation period is about 16 days and fledging occurs 15 to 17 days after hatch. Both parents provision nestlings. Predation of nests by the common marmoset (Callithrix jacchus) has been observed.

=== Vocalization ===
The yellow-bellied elaenia's dawn song has been rendered as "trr-dyeéuw, trr-trreeenh-weeeuw" or "we-do, we-do". Other renderings are "a series of burry teeotree or tee-tree notes interspersed with an occasional wurrTREE" and "a leisurely and buzzy spud-deeer, spud-deer-dzz, spud-deer... over and over". its calls include a "hoarse 'breeer', rising and then falling" and a "repeated 'wreek-kreeup' with hoarse or burry quality".

== Status ==
The IUCN has assessed the yellow-bellied elaenia as being of Least Concern. It has an extremely large range; its estimated population of at least five million mature individuals is believed to be stable. No immediate threats have been identified. It is considered fairly common to common in most of its range though uncommon on the Pacific slope of northern Central America and rare in northwesternmost Costa Rica. It occurs in a large number of protected areas both public and private. Its "[p]reference for more open woodland and widespread tolerance of converted habitats, combined with large range, suggest that this species is reasonably secure".
