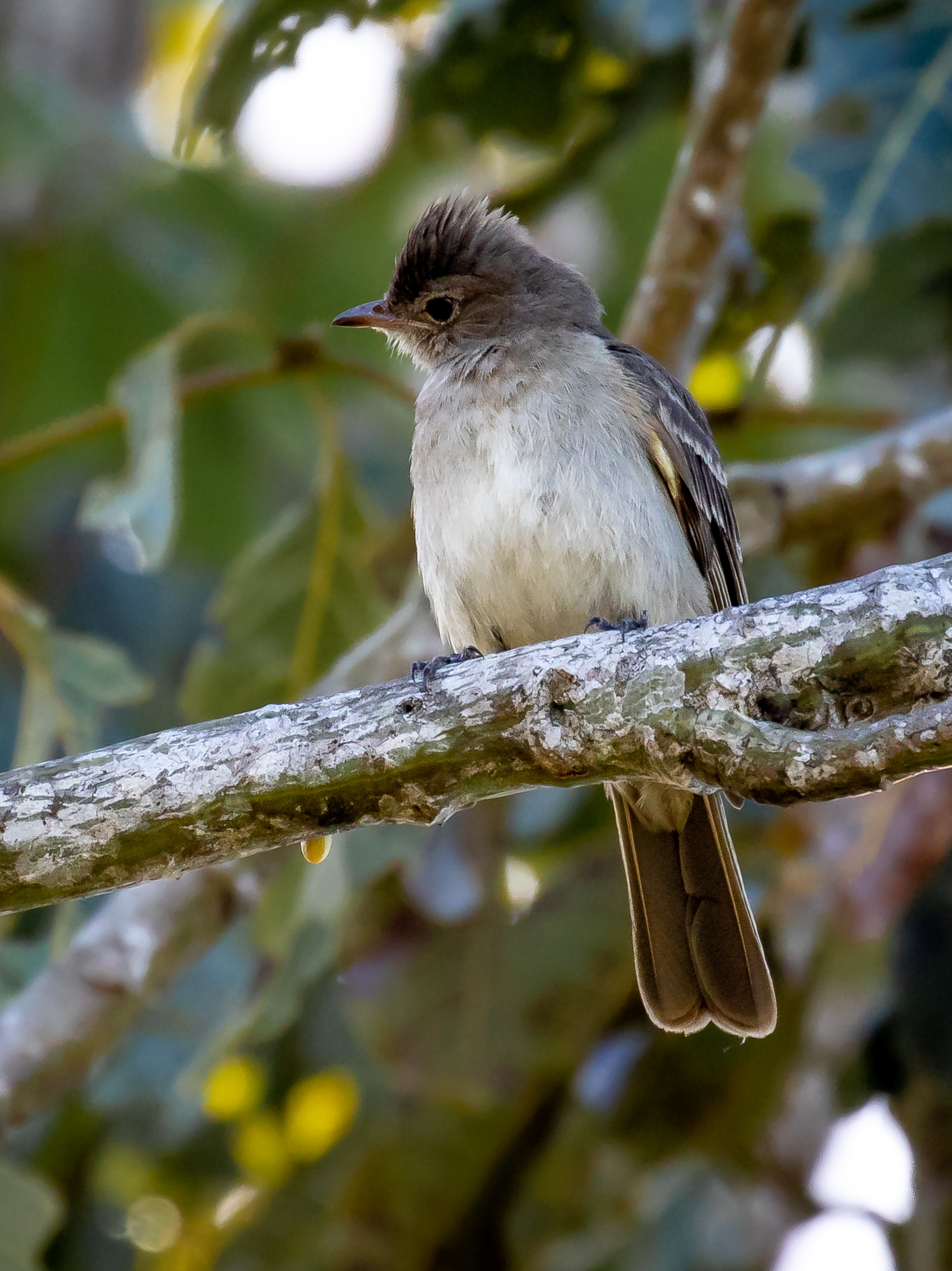
- Brownish elaenia at Iranduba, Amazonas, Brazil

Conservation status
- Least Concern (IUCN 3.1)

Scientific classification
- Kingdom: Animalia
- Phylum: Chordata
- Class: Aves
- Order: Passeriformes
- Family: Tyrannidae
- Genus: Elaenia
- Species: E. pelzelni

Binomial name
- Elaenia pelzelni Berlepsch, 1907

= Brownish elaenia =

Species of bird

The brownish elaenia (Elaenia pelzelni) is a species of bird in subfamily Elaeniinae of family Tyrannidae, the tyrant flycatchers. It is found in Bolivia, Brazil, Peru, and possibly Colombia.

== Taxonomy and systematics ==
The brownish elaenia is monotypic.

== Description ==
The brownish elaenia is about 18 cm (7.1 in) long. It is a large elaenia with no crest. The sexes have almost the same plumage. Adults have dull brownish head with lighter brown cheeks, a faint whitish eyering, and whitish lores. Males have a partially hidden white patch on the crown; females lack it. Both sexes' upperparts are plain dull brownish. Their wings are mostly dusky brown; the flight feathers have whitish edges and the tips of the coverts are pale brown. The latter show as three brownish white bars on the closed wing. Their tail is dusky brown. Their throat is white, their breast and flanks are whitish with a dingy brownish wash, their belly whitish without the wash, and their undertail coverts whitish with sometimes a slight brownish cast. Both sexes have a dark brown iris, a black maxilla, a pale pinkish mandible with a black tip, and black legs and feet.

== Distribution and habitat ==
The brownish elaenia is found along the main stem of the Amazon River in Peru and Brazil and also its major southern tributaries. These include the Napo and possibly the Ucayali rivers in northeastern Peru, the Beni and Madre de Dios rivers in far northern Bolivia, and the Juruá, Madeira, lower Xingu, and Iriri rivers in Brazil. Some sources also place it in extreme southeastern Colombia where the upper Amazon forms the border with Peru. However, the South American Classification Committee of the American Ornithological Society classes it as hypothetical in that country because it has no formally documented records from there.

The brownish elaenia primarily inhabits river islands with forest dominated by Cecropia; it also occurs in shrubby second growth there and along the riverbanks. In elevation it ranges from sea level only up to about 200 m (650 ft) above it.

== Behavior ==
=== Movement ===
The brownish elaenia is probably a year-round resident throughout its range but is suspected of making local movements in response to changing food supplies or water levels.

=== Feeding ===
The brownish elaenia's diet has not been studied but is assumed to be insects and fruits. Its "specialized habitat suggests possible extensive reliance on Cecropia fruits".

=== Breeding ===
"More study needed."

=== Vocalization ===
The brownish elaenia's vocalizations are "a deep, gruff DJI-drt or DJI-drt-drt, and a rich p' chup-urt?".

== Status ==
The IUCN has assessed the brownish elaenia as being of Least Concern. It has a large range; its population size is not known and is believed to be decreasing. No immediate threats have been identified. It is considered generally uncommon to fairly common but is not well known.
