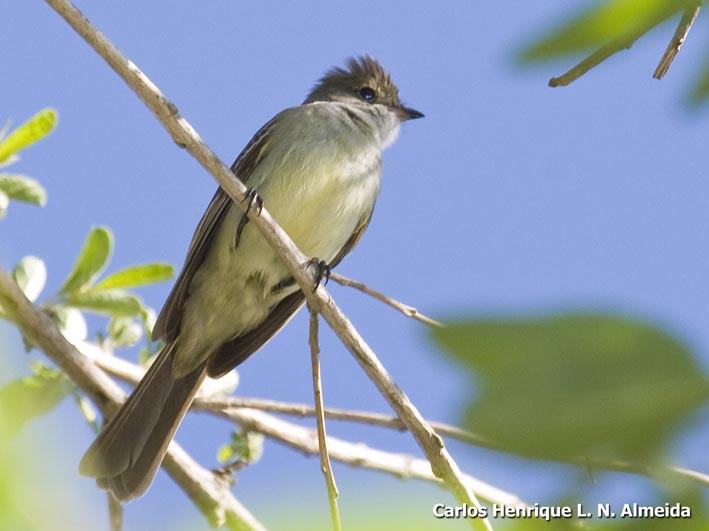
- at Brotas, São Paulo State, Brazil

Conservation status
- Least Concern (IUCN 3.1)

Scientific classification
- Kingdom: Animalia
- Phylum: Chordata
- Class: Aves
- Order: Passeriformes
- Family: Tyrannidae
- Genus: Elaenia
- Species: E. spectabilis

Binomial name
- Elaenia spectabilis Pelzeln, 1868

= Large elaenia =

Species of bird

The large elaenia (Elaenia spectabilis) is a species of bird in subfamily Elaeniinae of family Tyrannidae, the tyrant flycatchers. It is found in Argentina, Bolivia, Brazil, Colombia, Ecuador, Paraguay, Peru, and Uruguay.

== Taxonomy and systematics ==
The large elaenia is monotypic.

In the mid twentieth century at least one author treated the large elaenia and the yellow-bellied elaenia (E. flavogaster) as conspecific. During the period several authors suggested that the Noronha elaenia (E. ridleyana) should be treated as a subspecies of the large elaenia. That suggestion did not gain wide acceptance and by the 1990s had been shown to be wrong.

== Description ==
The large elaenia is 16.5 to 18 cm (6.5 to 7.1 in) long and weighs 20 to 35 g (0.71 to 1.2 oz). It is a large elaenia with a small crest. The sexes have the same plumage. Adults have a mostly olive-brown head with a minimal or no white stripe in the middle of the crest. Their upperparts are dark grayish olive. Their wings are dusky with white tips on the coverts that show as three wing bars. Their tail is dusky. Their throat is grayish, their breast dark olive-gray, and their belly and undertail undertail coverts yellow. Both sexes have a dark brown to gray-brown iris, a black bill with a pale pinkish base to the mandible, and black legs and feet.

== Distribution and habitat ==
The large elaenia is found in the Amazon Basin from southeastern Colombia, eastern Ecuador, eastern Peru, and northern Bolivia across Brazil and from Amazonia south through Mato Grosso do Sul in Brazil and southeastern Bolivia into northwestern Argentina and through most of Paraguay and far northwestern Uruguay into northeastern Argentina as far as southern Buenos Aires Province. It inhabits the edges and shrubby openings in the interior of lowland forest, secondary forest, and riparian forest in the early stages of succession. In winter (see the Movement section) it occurs more often in riparian zones (including river islands) and areas with fruiting trees.

== Behavior ==
=== Movement ===
The large elaenia is a year-round resident in the southern part of its Brazilian range and in southeastern Bolivia, Paraguay, Uruguay, and Argentina. Some but not all individuals there migrate to Amazonian Brazil, northern Bolivia, eastern Peru, eastern Ecuador, and southeastern Colombia for the austral winter (generally March to October).

=== Feeding ===
The large elaenia feeds on insects and fruit. It typically forages alone and high in the forest canopy. It captures prey and plucks fruit by gleaning while perched and while briefly hovering.

=== Breeding ===
The large elania breeds between October and March. Its nest is a small cup made from sticks with lichens and moss on the outside and lined with plant fibers and feathers. It is typically placed in a branch fork between 4 and 6 m (13 and 20 ft) above the ground. The clutch is two eggs. The incubation period is 14 to 15 days and fledging occurs 17 to 19 days after hatch.

=== Vocalization ===
The large elaenia's dawn song is "a shrill, repetitious 'twee-wee-tweet' ". Its calls include "a soft 'cleeur' or 'wheeo' ", "wheer", and "cheer".

== Status ==
The IUCN has assessed the large elaenia as being of Least Concern. It has a large range; its population size is not known and is believed to be decreasing. No immediate threats have been identified. It occurs in protected areas in most of the countries in its range.
