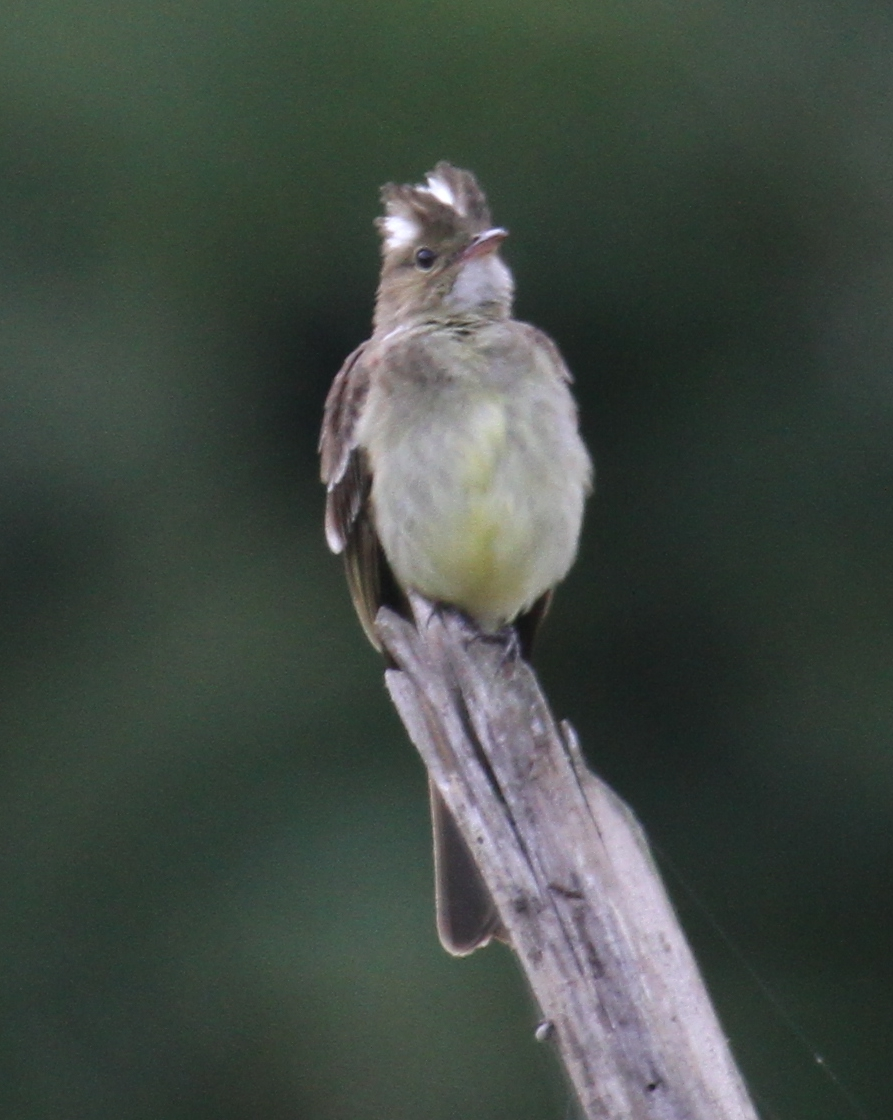
- Mottle-backed elaenia at Machu Huasi Oxbow Lake, Peru

Conservation status
- Least Concern (IUCN 3.1)

Scientific classification
- Kingdom: Animalia
- Phylum: Chordata
- Class: Aves
- Order: Passeriformes
- Family: Tyrannidae
- Genus: Elaenia
- Species: E. gigas

Binomial name
- Elaenia gigas Sclater, PL, 1871

= Mottle-backed elaenia =

Species of bird

The mottle-backed elaenia (Elaenia gigas) is a species of bird in subfamily Elaeniinae of family Tyrannidae, the tyrant flycatchers. It is found in Bolivia, Colombia, Ecuador, and Peru.

== Taxonomy and systematics ==
The mottle-backed elaenia is monotypic.

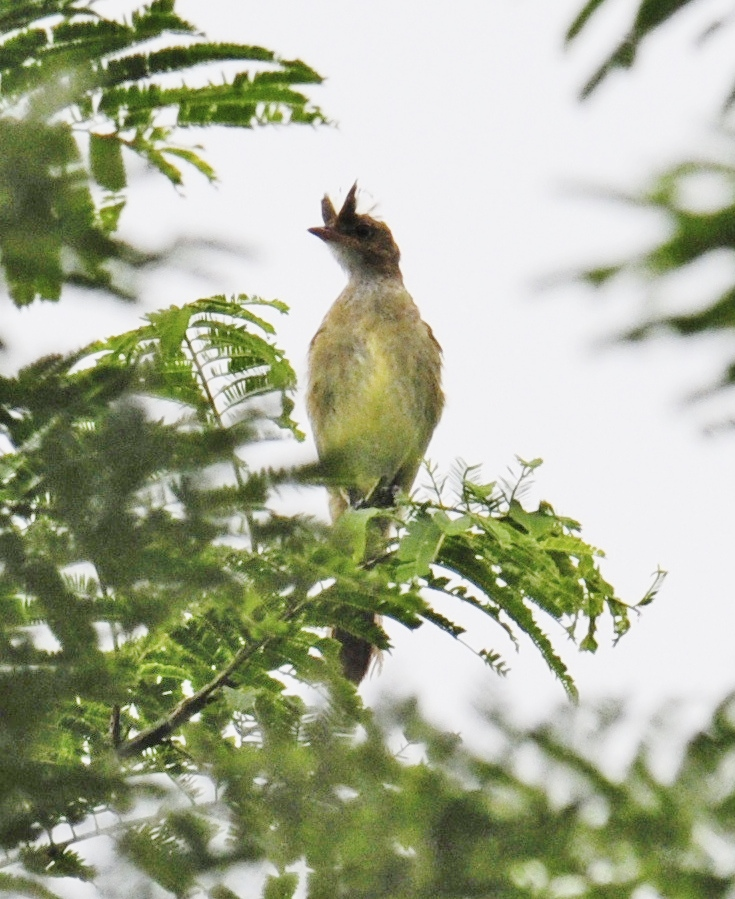
Mottle-backed elaenia at Garzacocha, Sucumbios, Ecuador

== Description ==
The mottle-backed elaenia is 17.5 to 18.5 cm (6.9 to 7.3 in) long. It is a large elaenia with a prominent split crest that can look like horns. The sexes have the same plumage. Adults have an olive-brown head with lighter cheeks, a faint whitish eyering, and a large white patch on the crown. Their upperparts are olive-brown with paler green-olive edges on the back feathers that give a mottled or streaked appearance. Their wings are mostly dusky; the flight feathers have whitish edges and the tips of the coverts are whitish. The latter show as two bars on the closed wing. Their tail is dusky. Their throat is gray, their breast and flanks gray with olive streaks or cloudiness, and their belly and undertail coverts pale yellow. Both sexes have a dark brown iris, a black bill with a dull pinkish base to the mandible, and black legs and feet.

== Distribution and habitat ==
The mottle-backed elaenia is found at the base of the east side of the Andes from western Meta Department in southern Colombia south through eastern Ecuador and eastern Peru into Bolivia as far as western Santa Cruz Department. It inhabits landscapes in relatively early stages of succession. These include riparian bands, regenerating landslides, abandoned human-made clearings, river islands, and the edges of more intact forest. In elevation it mostly occurs between 250 and 1,250 m (800 and 4,100 ft) but locally reaches 1,800 m (5,900 ft).

== Behavior ==
=== Movement ===
The mottle-backed elaenia is a year-round resident throughout its range.

=== Feeding ===
The mottle-backed elaenia feeds on insects and small fruits. It usually forages singly or in pairs, typically between 3 and 20 m (10 and 65 ft) above the ground. It captures prey and plucks fruit by gleaning while perched and while briefly hovering, and also captures flying insects on the wing.

=== Breeding ===
The mottle-backed elaenia's breeding season has not been defined but includes October and November. The one full described nest was a cup woven from pale rootlets; it had no lining and no external addititons. It was suspended in a branch fork 13 m (45 ft) up in a tree and held two nestlings. Nothing else is known about the species' breeding biology.

=== Vocalization ===
The mottle-backed elaenia's dawn song is " 'wurdit' or 'purdip' given repeatedly from top of low tree or bush". Its calls include "a martin-like 'direet' and a shrill 'pert-chéér' ".

== Status ==
The IUCN has assessed the mottle-backed elaenia as being of Least Concern. It has a large range; its population size is not known and is believed to be increasing. No immediate threats have been identified. It is considered "common near water" in Colombia, uncommon to locally common in Ecuador, and uncommon to fairly common in Peru. It occurs in several public and private protected areas and is "[p]ossibly extending its range as a result of deforestation".
