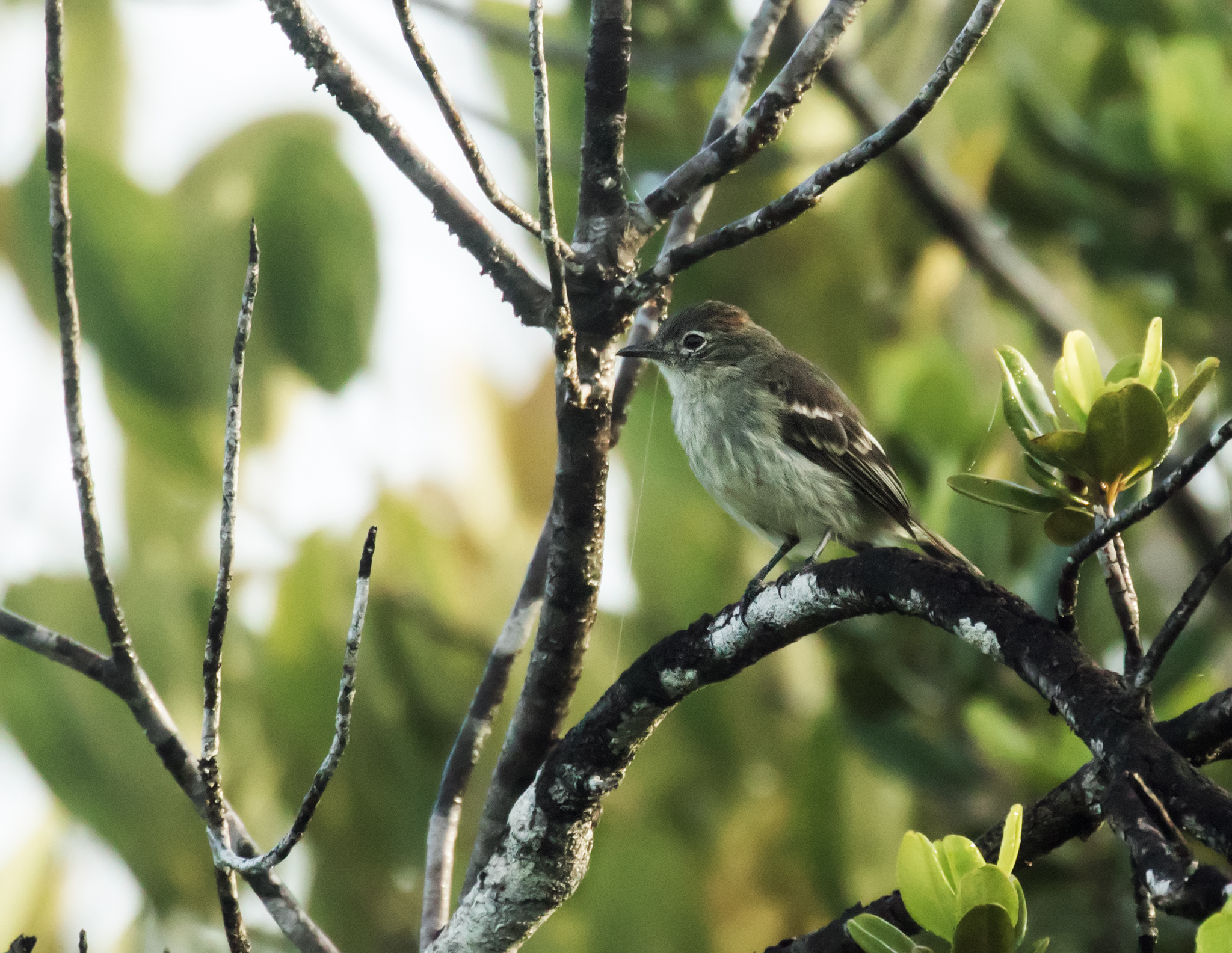

Conservation status
- Least Concern (IUCN 3.1)

Scientific classification
- Kingdom: Animalia
- Phylum: Chordata
- Class: Aves
- Order: Passeriformes
- Family: Tyrannidae
- Genus: Elaenia
- Species: E. ruficeps

Binomial name
- Elaenia ruficeps Pelzeln, 1868

= Rufous-crowned elaenia =

Species of bird

The rufous-crowned elaenia (Elaenia ruficeps) is a species of bird in subfamily Elaeniinae of family Tyrannidae, the tyrant flycatchers. It is found in Brazil, Colombia, French Guiana, Guyana, Suriname, and Venezuela.

== Taxonomy and systematics ==
The rufous-crowned elaenia is monotypic. It and the plain-crested elaenia (E. cristata) are probably sister species.

== Description ==
The rufous-crowned elaenia is about 14.5 to 15 cm (5.7 to 5.9 in) long and weighs about 19 g (0.67 oz). It is a small elaenia with a small but distinctively colored crest. The sexes have the same plumage. Adults have a dark olive-brown head with lighter cheeks, a faint whitish supercilium, and a thin whitish eyering. Their crown has a rufous patch that is usually concealed but is sometimes visible at the rear of the crest. Their upperparts are dark olive-brown. Their wings are mostly dusky with pale edges on the flight feathers. The tips of their wing coverts are whitish and show as two bars on the closed wing. Their tail is dusky. Their underparts are mostly pale yellow with some grayish olive streaks on the throat, breast, and flanks; their belly and undertail coverts are unmarked. Both sexes have a dark brown iris, a black bill with a pale pinkish base to the mandible, and black legs and feet.

== Distribution and habitat ==
The rufous-crowned elaenia has a disjunct distribution. One population is found from Meta Department in central Colombia east across southern Venezuela in Amazonas and Bolívar states and into far northwestern Brazil. Another is along the coastal margin of the Guianas. It also occurs locally in northern Brazil on both sides of the Amazon. It primarily inhabits landscapes on sandy soils including stunted forest, savannah with scattered shrubs and palms, cerrado, gallery forest, and the edges of woodlands. In elevation it occurs below 500 m (1,600 ft) in Colombia, up to 1,400 m (4,600 ft) in Venezuela, and mostly below 1,000 m (3,300 ft) in Brazil.

== Behavior ==
=== Movement ===
The rufous-crowned elaenia is believed to be a year-round resident.

=== Feeding ===
The rufous-crowned elaenia feeds on insects and small fruits. It forages singly or in pairs, usually up to about 8 m (25 ft) above the ground, and mostly by gleaning while perched and while briefly hovering. It occasionally joins mixed-species feeding flocks.

=== Breeding ===
The rufous-crowned elaenia's breeding seasons have not been defined but apparently include August in French Guiana and February to April in Colombia. The one known nest was a cup made from twigs and plant fibers in a palm frond. It contained two eggs. The incubation period, time to fledging, and details of parental care are not known.

=== Vocalization ===
The rufous-crowned elaenia's main vocalizations are an "energetic, rapid 'tji-tji-rrrrr' and other rattles and trills...that often start with [a] downslurred 'Wée-of-' ".

== Status ==
The IUCN has assessed the rufous-crowned elaenia as being of Least Concern. Its population is not known and is believed to be stable. No immediate threats have been identified. It is considered common in Colombia and uncommon in Venezuela. It occurs in at least two protected areas in Brazil. "Sandy-soil habitats have hitherto remained mostly unaffected by humans, as soils do not support agriculture."
