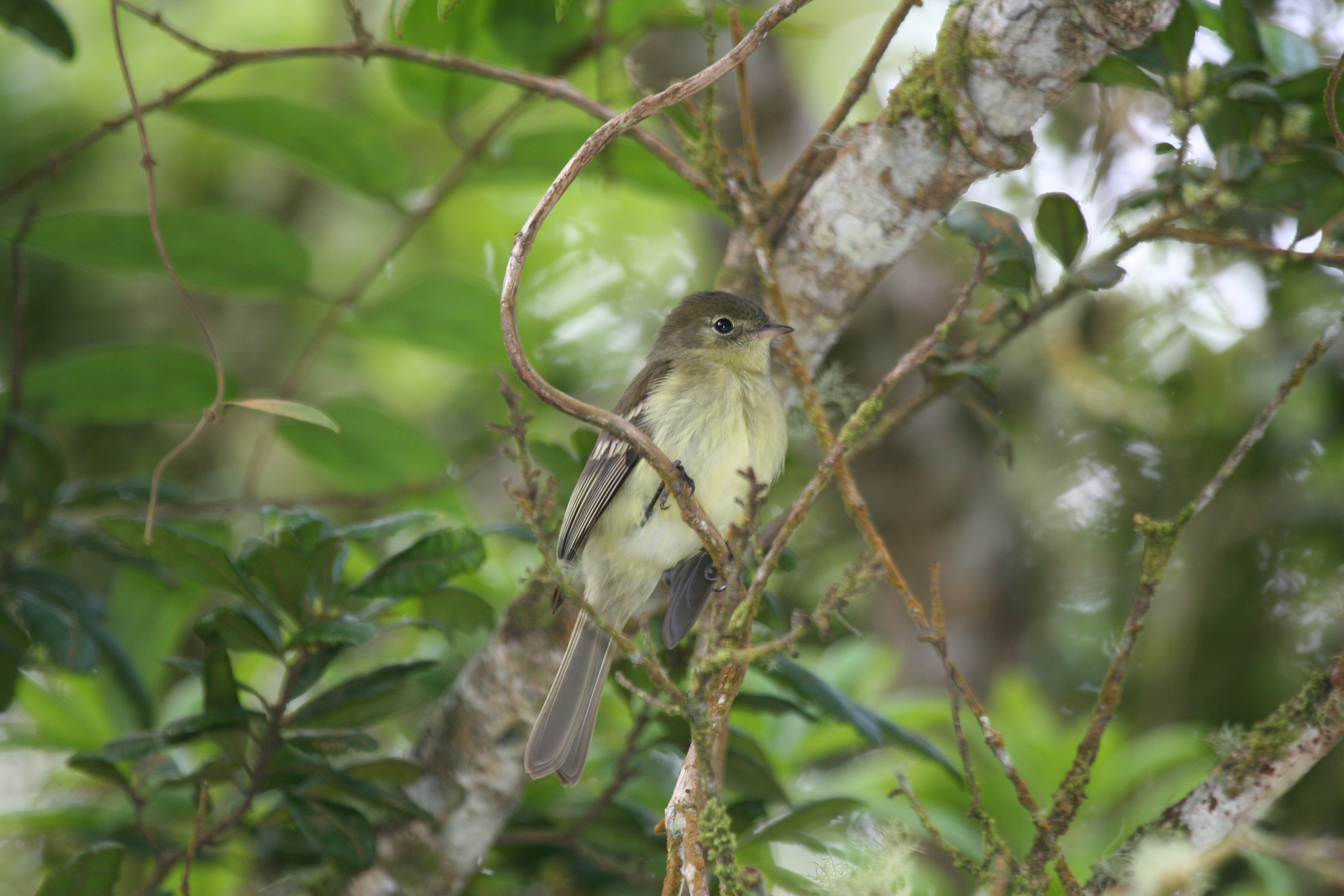

Conservation status
- Least Concern (IUCN 3.1)

Scientific classification
- Kingdom: Animalia
- Phylum: Chordata
- Class: Aves
- Order: Passeriformes
- Family: Tyrannidae
- Genus: Elaenia
- Species: E. fallax

Binomial name
- Elaenia fallax Sclater, PL, 1861

= Blue Mountain elaenia =

Greater Antillean elaenia

Species of bird

The Blue Mountain elaenia (Elaenia fallax) is a species of bird in subfamily Elaeniinae of family Tyrannidae, the tyrant flycatchers. It is endemic to Jamaica.

== Taxonomy and systematics ==
The American Ornithological Society, the International Ornithological Committee, and the Clements taxonomy formerly considered it to be conspecific with the Hispaniolan elaenia. In 2025 it was split by the IOC and Clements Checklist owing to DNA evidence, subtle physical differences between the two species and more substantial vocal differences. It is considered monotypic.

== Description ==
The Blue Mountain elaenia is 14.5 to 16 cm (5.7 to 6.3 in) long and weighs about 13 to 15 g (0.46 to 0.53 oz). It is a medium-sized elaenia with a slight crest. The sexes have the same plumage. Adults of the nominate subspecies have a dark olive-brown head with white or pale yellowish lores, a faint white or pale yellowish eyering, a faint darker line through the eye, and a thin white strip in the center of the crown that is usually not visible. Their upperparts are dark olive-brown. Their wings are dusky with paler edges on the flight feathers. The tips of their wing coverts are whitish or greenish white and show as two bars on the closed wing. Their tail is grayish or dusky. Their underparts are mostly dull yellow with faint streaks or a wash of dull olive or grayish. Both sexes have a dark brown iris and black legs and feet. It differs from the Hispaniolan elaenia in that it has a black maxilla and a pinkish mandible with a black tip while the Hispaniolan elaenia also has a black maxilla but its mandible is mostly black with a pinkish base.

== Distribution and habitat ==
It is endemic to the island of Jamaica. Most are found in the Port Royal Mountains, the Blue Mountains, and the higher parts of St. Andrew Parish.

It is found in the interior and edges of humid lowland and montane forest and in open country with scattered trees. In elevation it ranges between 500 and 2,000 m (1,600 and 6,600 ft).

== Behavior ==
=== Movement ===
Blue Mountain elaenia's are considered to be year-round residents. However, they appear to move between breeding at higher elevations and wintering more spread out at lower ones.

=== Feeding ===
The Blue Mountain elaenia is known to feed on insects and fruits. It forages singly or in pairs and regularly joins mixed-species feeding flocks. It feeds at all levels of the forest, finding food by gleaning while perched, while briefly hovering, and during short sallies.

=== Breeding ===
The Blue Mountain elaenia apparently breeds between May and July. Its nest is a cup made of moss and lined with feathers; it can be built low in a bush or high in a tree. The clutch is normally two eggs and the incubation period, time to fledging, and details of parental care are not known.

=== Vocalization ===
The Blue Mountain elaenia's day song is "tseerrr-che-wit-che-wit ... tseerr-che-wit ... che-wit ... che-wit". It also makes "a rather long downslurred plaintive whistle".

== Status ==
The IUCN has assessed the Blue Mountain elaenia as being of Least Concern. It lacks a known population size but is thought to be decreasing. It is potentially threatened by the effects of climate change on their habitats. It's considered to be abundant in its apparent higher elevation breeding range. "Some 75% of original forest cover in Jamaica has already been cleared, and the remaining forest is largely second growth; undisturbed forest survives only on high mountain slopes, some of which are protected within Blue Mountain and John Crow National Park, but hunting and habitat destruction continue because of lack of funds for effective protection and management."
