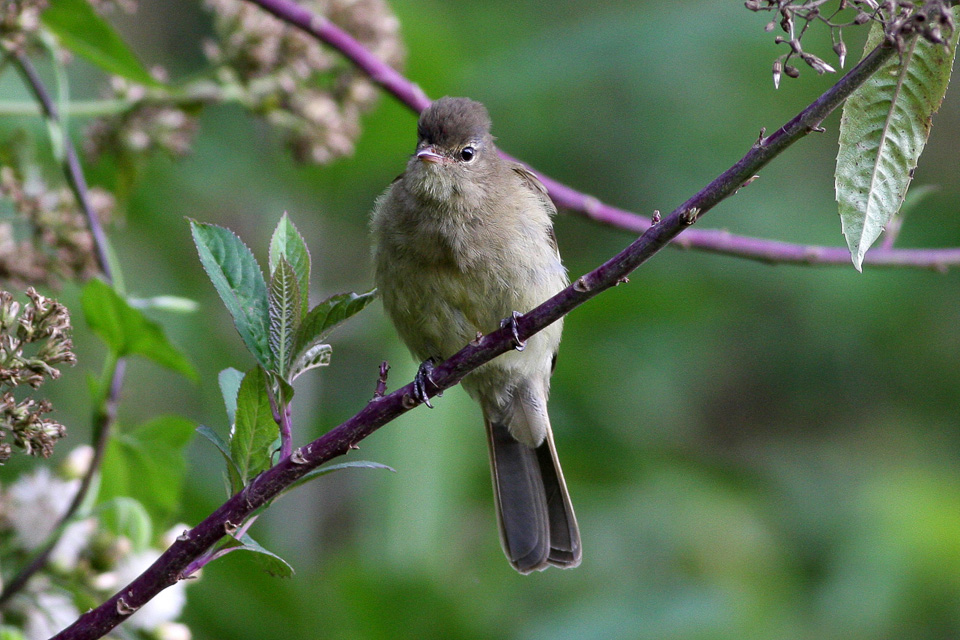

Conservation status
- Least Concern (IUCN 3.1)

Scientific classification
- Kingdom: Animalia
- Phylum: Chordata
- Class: Aves
- Order: Passeriformes
- Family: Tyrannidae
- Genus: Elaenia
- Species: E. obscura

Binomial name
- Elaenia obscura (d'Orbigny & Lafresnaye, 1837)

= Highland elaenia =

Species of bird

The highland elaenia (Elaenia obscura) is a species of bird in subfamily Elaeniinae of family Tyrannidae, the tyrant flycatchers. It is found in Argentina, Bolivia, Ecuador, and Peru.

== Taxonomy and systematics ==
The highland elaenia is monotypic. What is now the small-headed elaenia (E. sordida) was previously treated as a subspecies of it; between 2016 and 2020 taxonomic systems split the two.

== Description ==
The highland elaenia is 16 to 19 cm (6.3 to 7.5 in) long and weighs about 14 to 24 g (0.49 to 0.85 oz). It is a large elaenia without a crest. The sexes have the same plumage. Adults have a dark grayish olive head with lighter cheeks, a dusky loral spot, and a thin whitish eyering. Their upperparts are dark grayish olive. Their wings are mostly dusky with pale edges on the flight feathers. The tips of their wing coverts are yellowish and show as two bars on the closed wing. Their tail is dusky with white tips on unworn feathers. Their chin and throat are pale yellow, their breast and flanks dull olive, and their belly and undertail coverts pale yellow. Both sexes have a dark brown iris, a stubby black bill with a pinkish base to the mandible, and black legs and feet. Juveniles have dark rufescent brown upperparts and dirty grayish white underparts.

== Distribution and habitat ==
The highland elaenia is found from Azuay and Loja provinces in southern Ecuador south on the east slope of the Andes through Peru and Bolivia into northwestern Argentina as far as Tucumán Province. It inhabits the undergrowth and edges of humid subtropical and temperate forest, secondary forest, and stunted cloudforest. It also inhabits forest fragments and patches of young secondary forest. In elevation it occurs between 2,150 and 3,000 m (7,100 and 9,800 ft) in Ecuador, between 1,400 and 2,700 m (4,600 and 8,900 ft) in Peru, and mostly between 1,700 and 3,000 m (5,600 and 9,800 ft) in Bolivia and Argentina.

== Behavior ==
=== Movement ===
The highland elaenia appears to be a year-round resident throughout its range though local movements may occur in Bolivia.

=== Feeding ===
The highland elaenia feeds on insects and berries. It primarily forages near the top of the forest canopy but tends to remain hidden. It finds food by gleaning while perched, while briefly hovering, and with short upward sallies to take insects in mid-air.

=== Breeding ===
The highland elaenia breeds between October and February in Bolivia; its season includes December and January in Argentina. Its breeding season elsewhere is not known. Its nest is a cup made from twigs with moss and lichens on the outside and a lining of feathers, placed in a tree. Its clutch is two eggs that are white with reddish brown and lilac markings. The incubation period, time to fledging, and details of parental care are not known.

=== Vocalization ===
The highland elaenia's song differs somewhat across its range, but the songs are variations on a "weehr-drrrr-whee" phrase. Short notes or whistles are sometimes added. The species' call is "a rising-falling or purely descending 'breerr' ".

== Status ==
The IUCN has assessed the highland elaenia as being of Least Concern. It has a large range; its population size is not known and is believed to be stable. No immediate threats have been identified. It is considered rare and local in Ecuador and fairly common but local in Peru. It occurs in protected areas from Peru south, and "[a]ccepts rather disturbed habitats, as well as fragmented habitats".
