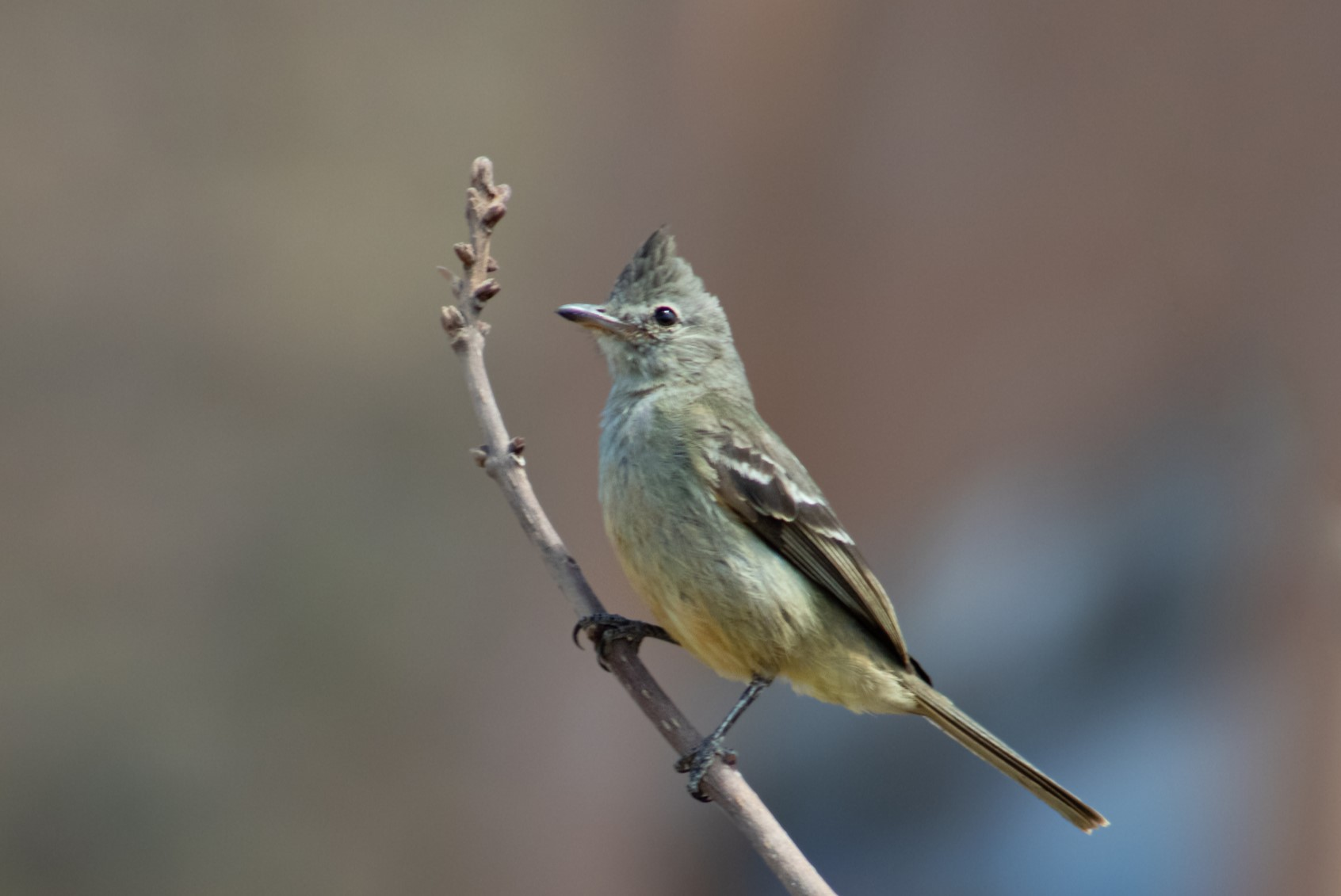

Conservation status
- Least Concern (IUCN 3.1)

Scientific classification
- Kingdom: Animalia
- Phylum: Chordata
- Class: Aves
- Order: Passeriformes
- Family: Tyrannidae
- Genus: Elaenia
- Species: E. cristata

Binomial name
- Elaenia cristata Pelzeln, 1868

Subspecies
- See text

= Plain-crested elaenia =

Species of bird

The plain-crested elaenia (Elaenia cristata) is a species of bird in subfamily Elaeniinae of family Tyrannidae, the tyrant flycatchers. It is found in Bolivia, Brazil, Colombia, French Guiana, Guyana, Peru, Suriname, and Venezuela.

== Taxonomy and systematics ==
The plain-crested elaenia has two subspecies, the nominate E. c. cristata (Pelzeln, 1868) and E. c. alticola (Zimmer & Phelps Sr., 1946)

The plain-crested elaenia and the rufous-crowned elaenia (E. ruficeps) are sister species.

== Description ==
The plain-crested elaenia is 12.5 to 15 cm (4.9 to 5.9 in) long and weighs about 18 g (0.63 oz). It is a small elaenia with a conspicuous crest. The two subspecies and the sexes have essentially the same plumage. Adults have a dull olive-brown head with lighter brown cheeks and a thin whitish eyering. Their upperparts are dull olive-brown. Their wings are mostly dusky; the flight feathers have whitish edges and the tips of the coverts are whitish. The latter show as two bars on the closed wing. Their tail is dusky. Their throat is grayish white, their breast grayish olive, and their belly and undertail coverts pale yellow. Both sexes of both subspecies have a dark brown iris, a black maxilla, a pale mandible with a brownish tip, and black legs and feet.

== Distribution and habitat ==
The nominate subspecies of the plain-crested elaenia has by far the larger range of the two. It is found contiguously from east of the Andes in Venezuela, through the Guianas, throughout eastern Brazil in an area roughly bounded by the states of Amapá, Rio Grande do Norte, northeastern Bahia, São Paulo and western Mato Grosso, and from the last slightly into northeastern Bolivia's Santa Cruz Department. It also occurs in isolated populations in Caquetá and Vaupés departments in southeastern Colombia, in Cuzco and Madre de Dios departments in southeastern Peru, in La Paz and Beni departments in northern Bolivia, and in Rondônia state in western Amazonian Brazil. Subspecies E. c. alticola is found only in the tepuis of southeastern Venezuela and adjacent northwestern Brazil.

The plain-crested elaenia primarily inhabits savanna; it also occurs in open park-like savanna woodlands, scrubby areas, and cerrado. One of its Peruvian populations is in the dry middle valley of the Urubamba River at about 1,100 m (3,600 ft) of elevation. It otherwise occurs from sea level to 1,500 m (4,900 ft) in Brazil and 1,350 m (4,400 ft) in Venezuela, but only to about 200 m (660 ft) in Colombia.

== Behavior ==
=== Movement ===
The plain-crested elaenia is a year-round resident in most of its range. However, numbers increase in Mato Grosso in August and September so some movement is suspected.

=== Feeding ===
The plain-crested elaenia feeds on insects and berries. It forages singly or in pairs, usually near the top of shrubs and trees, and mostly by gleaning while perched or while briefly hovering.

=== Breeding ===
The plain-crested elaenia breeds between August and December in Minas Gerais, Brazil; its breeding season elsewhere has not been defined. Its nest is a cup woven from moss, lined with plant wool, and with lichens on the outside. It is typically placed in a branch fork in a shrub about 1 m (3 ft) above the ground. Its clutch is one or two eggs. The incubation period is about 18 to 19 days and fledging occurs about 17 to 19 days after hatch.

=== Vocalization ===
The plain-crested elaenia's song is a "raspy 'zree-zree-zuzu' or 'zreeeh dudu' and variations thereof". Its calls include a "soft melodious 'wee' ", a "short rattle as 'wee'he'he'he'he' ", a "low 'wheesp' or 'wheeb' ", and a "rising and then falling 'dsooty-ééo' ".

== Status ==
The IUCN has assessed the plain-crested elaenia as being of Least Concern. It has a large range; its population size is not known and is believed to be decreasing. No immediate threats have been identified. It is considered fairly common in most of its range but uncommon to locally fairly common in Venezuela and uncommon and local in Colombia. It occurs in many national parks and other protected areas.
