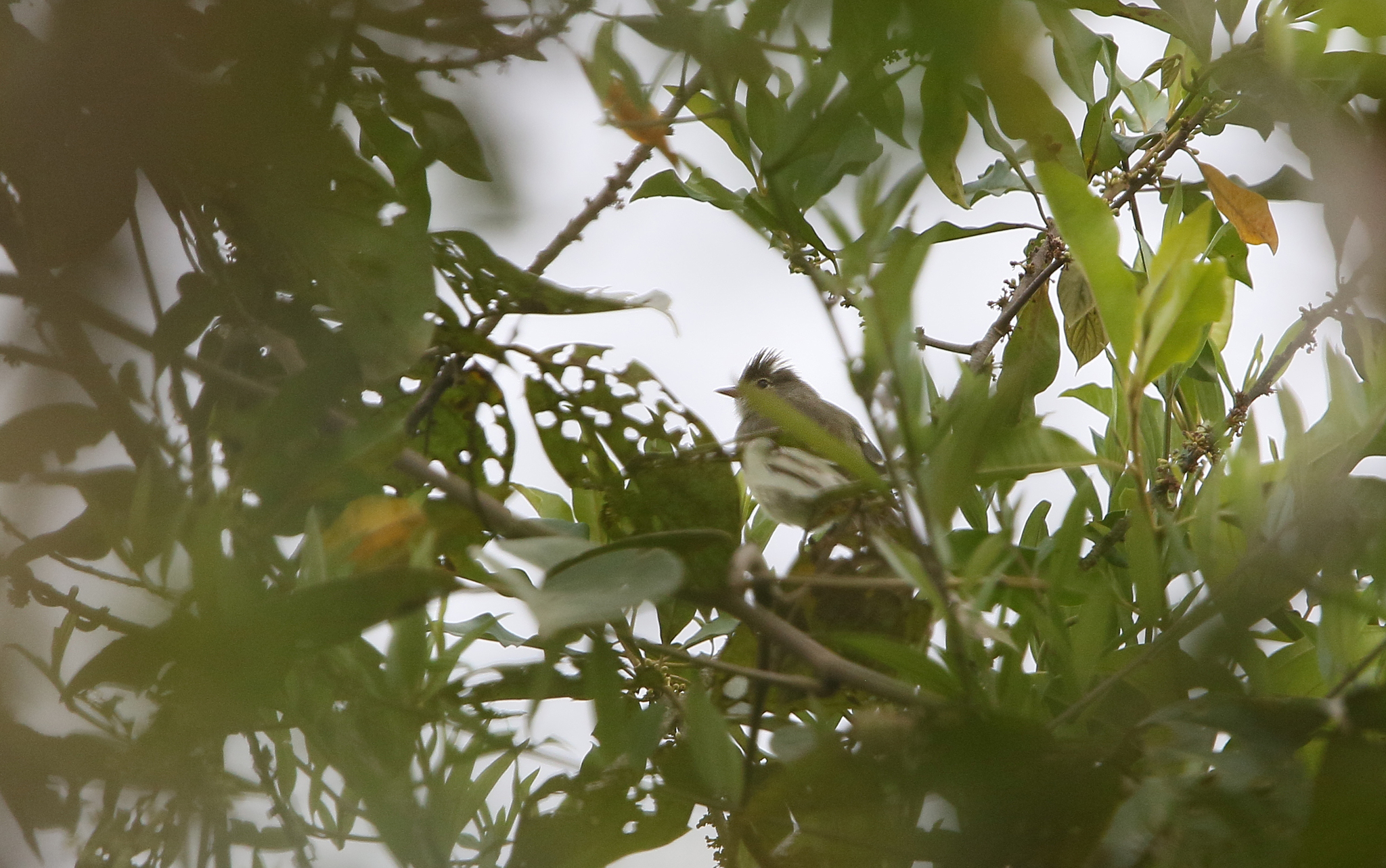

Conservation status
- Least Concern (IUCN 3.1)

Scientific classification
- Kingdom: Animalia
- Phylum: Chordata
- Class: Aves
- Order: Passeriformes
- Family: Tyrannidae
- Genus: Elaenia
- Species: E. brachyptera

Binomial name
- Elaenia brachyptera von Berlepsch, 1907

Synonyms
- Elaenia chiriquensis brachyptera

= Coopmans's elaenia =

Species of bird

Coopmans's elaenia (Elaenia brachyptera) is a species of bird in subfamily Elaeniinae of family Tyrannidae, the tyrant flycatchers. It is found in Colombia and Ecuador.

== Taxonomy and systematics ==
Coopmans's elaenia was previously known as a subspecies of the lesser elaenia (C. chiriquensis). Based on a study published in 2015, taxonomic systems recognized it as a species starting in 2016.

Coopmans's elaenia is monotypic.

== Description ==
Coopmans's elaenia is about 13.5 cm (5.3 in) long. It is a small elaenia with a small squarish crest. The sexes have the same plumage. Adults have a brownish olive head with lighter cheeks, a thin whitish eyering, and a mostly hidden white patch on the crown. Their upperparts are brownish olive. Their wings are mostly dusky with whitish edges on the flight feathers. The tips of their wing coverts are white and show as two wide bars on the closed wing. Their tail is dusky. Their throat is gray, their breast gray-olive, and their belly and undertail coverts pale yellow. Both sexes have a dark brown iris, a black bill with a pinkish base to the mandible, and black legs and feet.

== Distribution and habitat ==
Coopmans's elaenia has a disjunct distribution. On population is found from Nariño Department in far southwestern Colombia south into Ecuador as far as northern Pichincha Province. The other is found on the east side of the Ecuadoran Andes at a few locations in Napo and Morona-Santiago provinces. There is speculation that this population's range extends north into southern Colombia and south into northeastern Peru. The species inhabits a variety of semi-open landscapes such as light woodlands and clearings and edges in thicker forest. In elevation it ranges between 700 and 2,800 m (2,300 and 9,200 ft) in the northwest and between about 900 and 1,900 m (3,000 and 6,200 ft) east of the Andes.

== Behavior ==
=== Movement ===
Coopmans's elaenia is believed to be a year-round resident.

=== Feeding ===
The diet and foraging behavior of Coopmans's elaenia are not known. They are probably similar to those of its former "parent" the lesser elaenia, which see here.

=== Breeding ===
Nothing is known about the breeding biology of Coopmans's elaenia.

=== Vocalization ===
The vocalizations of Coopmans's elaenia were the principal evidence used to establish it as a species separate from the lesser elaenia. The two populations have similar but not identical dawn songs. That of the northwestern population is rendered "tsee...tsee...chee-wee" while that of the eastern population is "wit...wit...weedeew". Its daytime song is "a burry 'bweer, wheeb, wher'r'r'r' ". A unique vocalization is "a rattle call lasting up to c. 1 second and comprising up to 15 notes" that has never been heard from the lesser elaenia.

== Status ==
The IUCN has assessed Coopmans's elaenia as being of Least Concern. Its population is not known and is believed to be decreasing. No immediate threats have been identified. In the northwest it is considered "apparently local [and its] status confused by identification difficulties". It is known from too few locations east of the Andes to evaluate its density.
