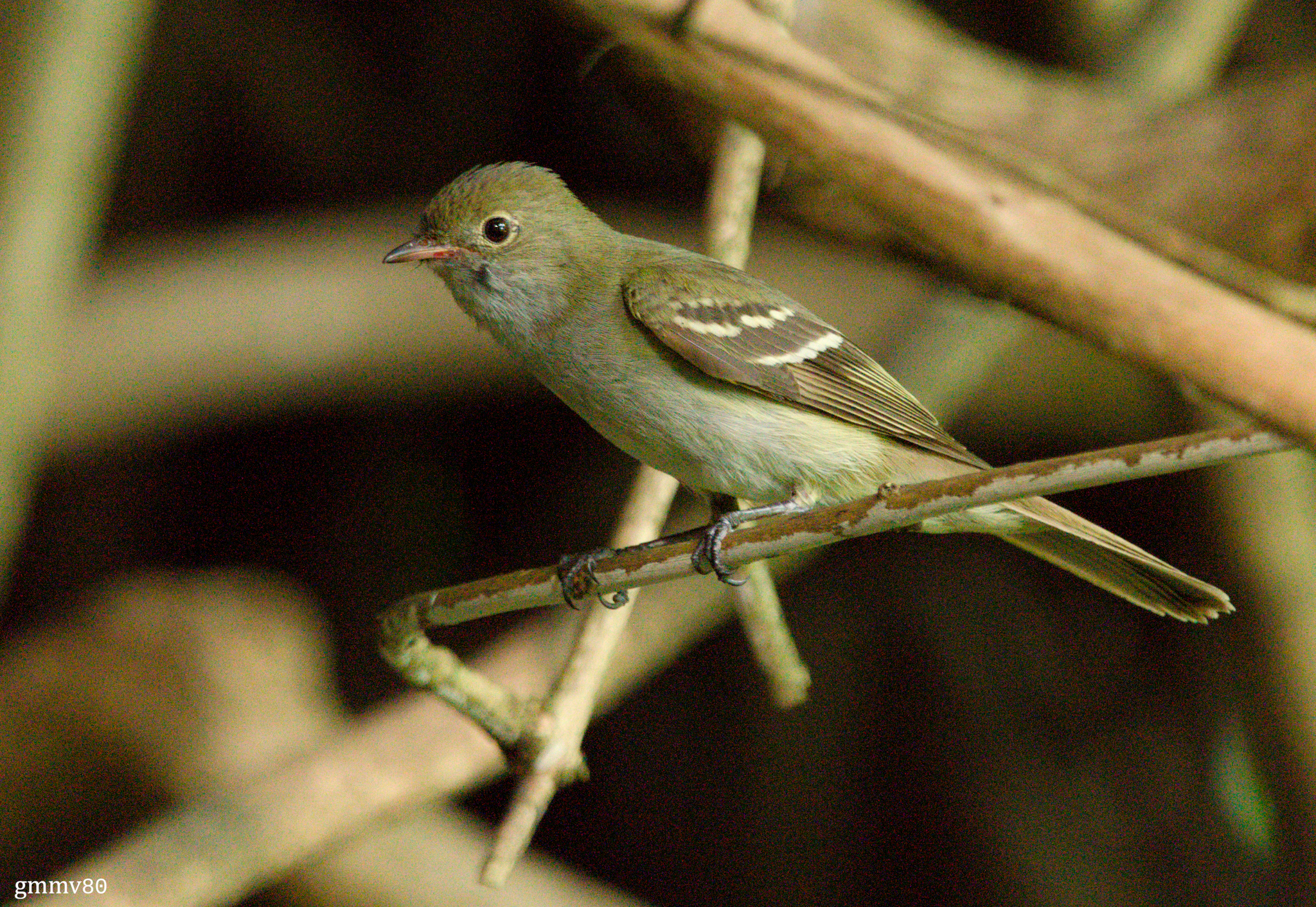
- In Montevideo, Uruguay

Conservation status
- Least Concern (IUCN 3.1)

Scientific classification
- Kingdom: Animalia
- Phylum: Chordata
- Class: Aves
- Order: Passeriformes
- Family: Tyrannidae
- Genus: Elaenia
- Species: E. parvirostris

Binomial name
- Elaenia parvirostris Pelzeln, 1868

= Small-billed elaenia =

Species of bird

The small-billed elaenia (Elaenia parvirostris) is a species of bird in subfamily Elaeniinae of family Tyrannidae, the tyrant flycatchers. It is found in every mainland South American country except Chile, plus Aruba and Trinidad.

== Taxonomy and systematics ==
The small-billed elaenia is monotypic.

== Description ==
The small-billed elaenia is 13 to 15 cm (5.1 to 5.9 in) long. It is a small elaenia without a crest. The sexes have the same plumage. Adults have a bright olive-green crown with a partially visible white stripe in the middle. They have whitish lores and a thin but distinct white eyering. Their upperparts are bright olive-green. Their wings are dusky with whitish tips on the coverts that show as three wing bars. Their flight feathers have narrow whitish edges.The Small-billed elaenia features a short, stubby beak with a slightly curved upper mandible that is perfectly adapted for snatching insects and plucking small berries. Its bill is notably smaller and more delicate than those of other similar flycatchers, serving as a key identifying feature for birdwatchers in South America. Their tail is dusky. Their throat is gray, their breast a slightly darker gray with sometimes an olive wash, and their belly and undertail coverts whitish. Both sexes have a dark brown iris, a black bill with a dull pinkish base to the mandible, and black legs and feet.

== Distribution and habitat ==
The small-billed elaenia breeds in eastern and southeastern Bolivia, most of Paraguay, Brazil from São Paulo state south through Rio Grande do Sul, all of Uruguay, and northeastern Argentina as far south as central Buenos Aires Province and coastally somewhat further. For the austral winter it moves north into the western half of Brazil; northern Bolivia; east of the Andes in Peru, Ecuador, Colombia, and Venezuela; the Guianas; Aruba; and Trinidad. It has been documented as a vagrant twice in Illinois and once in each of Texas and Quebec, but not in Mexico, Central America, or the Caribbean away from the South American coastal islands. An individual was seen in Florida in 2025.

In its breeding range the small-billed elaenia inhabits somewhat open landscapes including the edges and openings of forest and woodland, riparian forest, secondary forest, taller shrublands, parks, and gardens. In the austral winter it also inhabits most of the same landscapes and adds savanna, the canopy of humid forest, and river islands.

== Behavior ==
=== Movement ===
As described above, the small-billed elaenia is highly migratory, moving almost entirely from its breeding range to areas farther north for the austral winter.

=== Feeding ===
The small-billed elaenia feeds on insects and small fruits. It typically forages singly but sometimes in a small group of congeners; it also sometimes joins mixed-species feeding flocks. It captures prey and plucks fruit by gleaning while perched and while briefly hovering and also captures flying insects on the wing.

=== Breeding ===
The small-billed elaenia breeds between September and March. Its nest is a cup made from small twigs and plant fibers with moss, lichen, and spiderweb on the outside. The clutch is two or three eggs. The incubation period is about 14 days and fledging occurs about 15 days after hatch.

=== Vocalization ===
The small-billed elaenia's dawn song is "a stuttering, deep, gravelly PEE-jip-p'p'jooee?". It has also been written as a "hurried, strong 'Wee-dr-dee-wuh' ". It is mostly silent on its wintering grounds but does make "a soft 'cheeu' " call there.

== Status ==
The IUCN has assessed the small-billed elaenia as being of Least Concern. It has an extremely large range; its population size is not known and is believed to be stable. No immediate threats have been identified. It is considered common in its breeding range and much of its wintering range, though uncommon in Ecuador and Colombia, fairly common in Peru, and uncommon to locally fairly common in Venezuela. It occurs in most of the public and private protected areas in its range. Its "[p]reference for edges and more open woodland, and widespread tolerance of disturbed and converted habitats, make this species unlikely to become threatened in near future".
