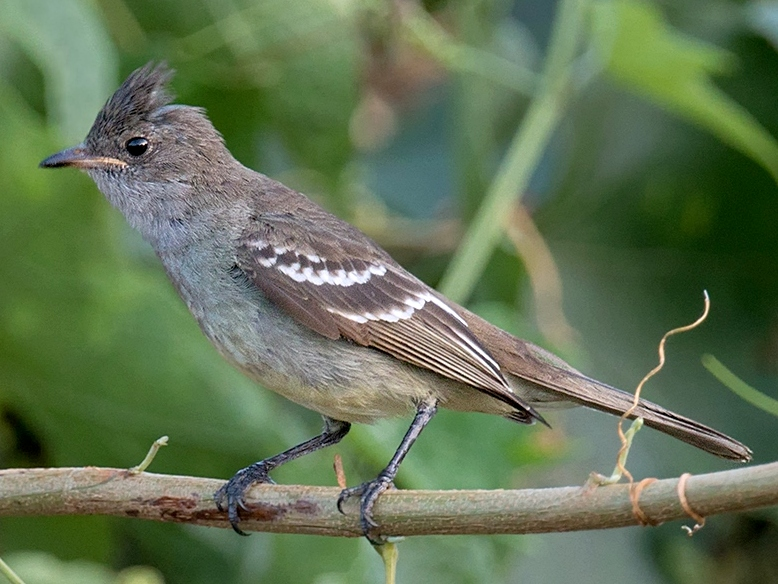
- at Fernando de Noronha, Brazil

Conservation status
- Vulnerable (IUCN 3.1)

Scientific classification
- Kingdom: Animalia
- Phylum: Chordata
- Class: Aves
- Order: Passeriformes
- Family: Tyrannidae
- Genus: Elaenia
- Species: E. ridleyana

Binomial name
- Elaenia ridleyana Sharpe, 1888

= Noronha elaenia =

Species of bird in Brazil

The Noronha elaenia (Elaenia ridleyana) is a Vulnerable species of bird in subfamily Elaeniinae of family Tyrannidae, the tyrant flycatchers. It is endemic to the Fernando de Noronha archipelago off the coast of Brazil.

== Taxonomy and systematics ==
In the mid twentieth century several authors suggested that the Noronha elaenia should be treated as a subspecies of the large elaenia (E. spectabilis) or the lesser elaenia (E. chiriquensis). Those suggestions did not gain wide acceptance and by the 1990s had been shown to be wrong. The three species' vocalizations are significantly different.

== Description ==
The Noronha elaenia is about 17 cm (6.7 in) long. It is large elaenia with a small crest. The sexes have the same plumage. Adults have a mostly olive-brown head with a minimal or no white stripe in the middle of the crest. Their upperparts are dark grayish olive. Their wings are dusky with white tips on the coverts that show as three wing bars. Their tail is dusky. Their throat is grayish, their breast dark olive-gray, and their belly and undertail coverts yellow. Both sexes have a dark brown iris, a black bill with a dull pinkish base to the mandible, and black legs and feet.

== Distribution and habitat ==
The Noronha elaenia is found only on Fernando de Noronha and Rata islands in the Fernando de Noronha Archipelago, in the Atlantic off Pernambuco state. It inhabits scrublands, dry woodland and other open forest, and thickets and gardens near human habitations.

== Behavior ==
=== Movement ===
The Noronha elaenia is a year-round inhabitat on the islands.

=== Feeding ===
The Noronha elaenia feeds on insects and small fruits, especially those of Ficus noronhae. Its foraging behavior is not known but is assumed to be similar to that of other Elaenia members; for example see here.

=== Breeding ===
The Noronha elaenia breeds between June and August. Its nest is a cup made from fibers of plants in the gourd family Cucurbitaceae and some thin twigs, lined with plant down, and often placed on a bare tree branch. The clutch size appears to be one or two eggs. The incubation period, time to fledging, and details of parental care are not known.

=== Vocalization ===
The Noronha elaenia's calls vary; one is a "high, descending 'tUuuw' in series with 1.5 sec intervals".

== Status ==
The IUCN has assessed the Noronha elaenia as Vulnerable. The total area of the two islands it inhabits is about 44 km^{2} (17 sq mi) of which only about 18 km^{2} (6.9 sq mi) has suitable habitat. Its estimated population of 700 - 1,000 mature individuals is believed to be stable. The primary threats to this species are the loss of its mature forest habitat – nearly all forests on the islands are now second growth – and predation from introduced species. It is the least common of the three land birds resident on the archipelago, but is projected to remain stable so long as remaining forest habitats are maintained.
