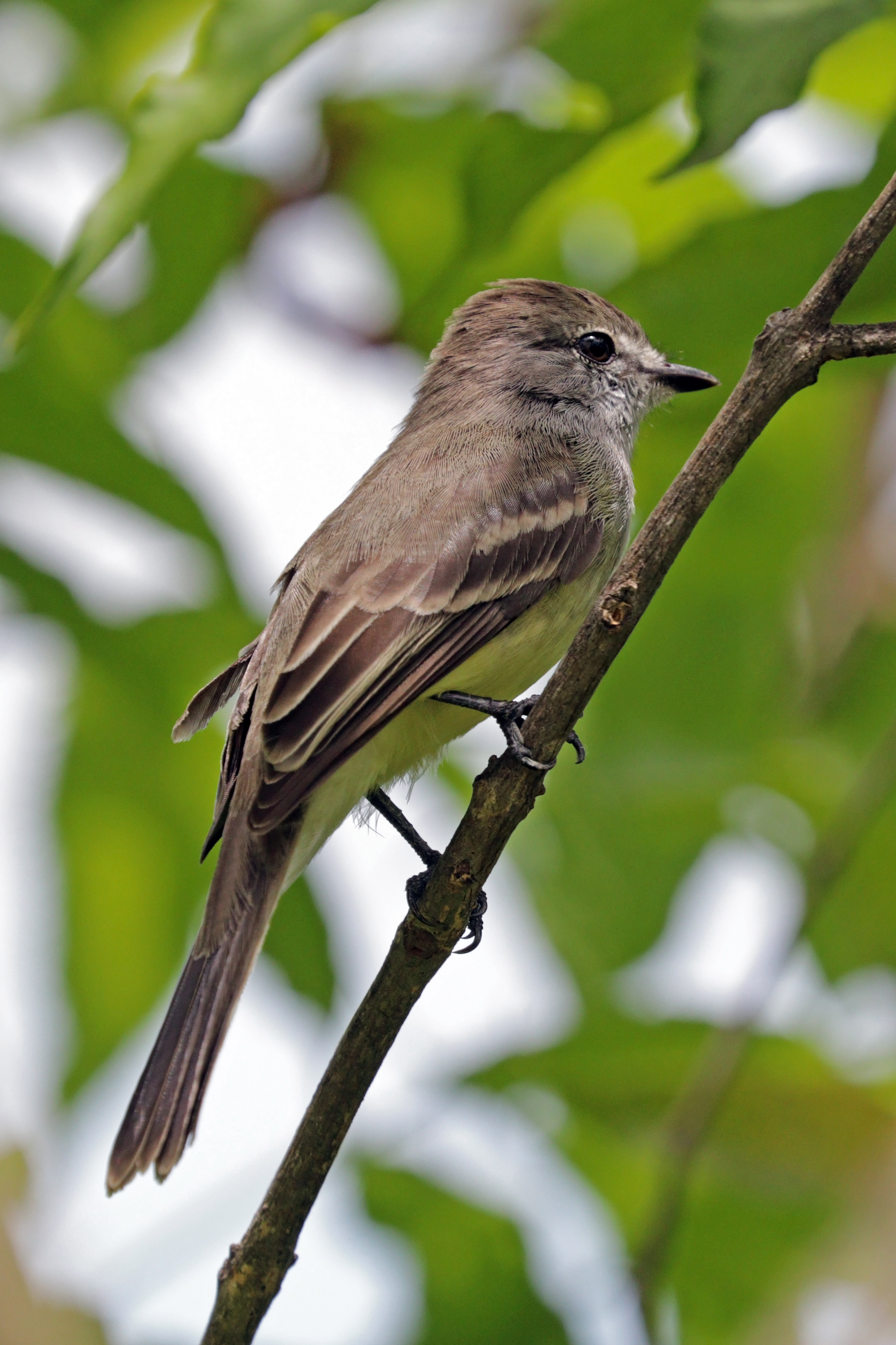
- In Panama

Conservation status
- Least Concern (IUCN 3.1)

Scientific classification
- Kingdom: Animalia
- Phylum: Chordata
- Class: Aves
- Order: Passeriformes
- Family: Tyrannidae
- Genus: Elaenia
- Species: E. chiriquensis

Binomial name
- Elaenia chiriquensis Lawrence, 1865

Subspecies
- See text

= Lesser elaenia =

Species of bird

The lesser elaenia (Elaenia chiriquensis) is a species of bird in subfamily Elaeniinae of family Tyrannidae, the tyrant flycatchers. It is found in Costa Rica, Panama, on Trinidad, in every mainland South American country except Chile and Uruguay, and as a vagrant on Bonaire and Curaçao.

== Taxonomy and systematics ==
The lesser elaenia has two subspecies, the nominate E. c. chiriquensis (Lawrence, 1865) and E. c. albivertex (Pelzeln, 1868). What is now Coopmans's elaenia (E. brachyptera) was previously a third subspecies of it. Based on a study published in 2015, taxonomic systems recognized it as a species starting in 2016.

== Description ==
The lesser elaenia is 13 to 14 cm (5.1 to 5.5 in) long and weighs 11.5 to 22 g (0.41 to 0.78 oz). It is a small elaenia with a small squarish crest. The sexes have the same plumage. Adults of the nominate subspecies have a grayish olive head with lighter cheeks, a thin whitish eyering, and a partially hidden white patch on the crown. Their upperparts are grayish olive. Their wings are mostly dusky with whitish edges on the flight feathers. The tips of the coverts are white and show as two wide bars on the closed wing. Their tail is dusky. Their throat is gray, their breast grayish olive, and their belly and undertail coverts pale yellow. Subspecies E. c. albivertex has paler underparts than the nominate but is otherwise like it. Both sexes of both subspecies have a dark brown iris, a black bill with a pinkish base to the mandible, and black legs and feet.

== Distribution and habitat ==
The lesser elaenia has a highly disjunct distribution. The nominate subspecies is found in scattered locations in the interior of Costa Rica, on the Pacific slope from that country's San José Province south through Panama to the Canal Zone, on the Caribbean side of Panama in Colón Province, and on Coiba Island and the Pearl Islands off Panama's Pacific coast. Subspecies E. c. albivertex is found in north, central, and eastern Colombia, in western and eastern Venezuela, on Trinidad, in the Guianas, in extreme southeastern Ecuador continuing south on the east side of the Andes into Peru to the Department of Junín, in a few other isolated places in Peru, across northern Bolivia, in eastern Paraguay, separately in far northern and northeastern Argentina, and in Brazil in a swath across the north of the country, south through eastern Amazonia, across the south-central part of the country, and along much of the southeastern coastal area. Subspecies E. c. albivertex has occurred as a vagrant on Bonaire and Curaçao.

The lesser elaenia inhabits a variety of open and semi-open landscapes in the tropical zone. These include scrublands, cerrado, light woodlands, secondary forest, brushy areas along watercourses, savanna grasslands with scattered shrubs and trees, plantations, and hedgerows in cultivated areas. In elevation it reaches 1,750 m (5,700 ft) in Central America, 2,000 m (6,600 ft) in Colombia, 3,000 m (9,800 ft) in Venezuela, and 2,000 m (6,600 ft) in Brazil.

== Behavior ==
=== Movement ===
The lesser elaenia is a year-round resident in much of its range. However, the southernmost Brazilian population apparently moves north for the austral winter, though how far is not known, and the species appears to be present in Rio Grande do Norte only between May and December. Its occurrence in the Guianas might also be due to movement from further south. There might also be some movement in the Panama population but its extent and timing are not known, though it is suspected to reach into Colombia and Venezuela.

=== Feeding ===
The lesser elaenia feeds on insects and berries; the latter apparently dominates in central Brazil. It forages singly or in pairs, usually from the upper levels of the understory and higher, and mostly by gleaning while perched, while briefly hovering, and with short sallies to take prey on the wing. It very rarely joins mixed-species feeding flocks.

=== Breeding ===
The lesser elaenia's breeding season varies widely across its range. It breeds beginning in March in Costa Rica, from mid-January to April or May in Panama, between March and June in Colombia, between April and June on Trinidad, and from September to December in central Brazil. It sometimes rears two broods in a season and will re-nest if its first nest fails. Its nest is a cup made from plant fibers, leaves, and moss lined with feathers, and typically placed in a shrub or tree up to about 4 m (15 ft) above the ground. In Panama at least only the female builds the nest. Clutch sizes apparently vary geographically, with up to four eggs known in Panama but a maximum of three in central Brazil. The eggs are dull white or pinkish with brown or reddish spots. Only the female is known to incubate the clutch; the period is 14 to 15 days. Females brood the nestlings and both parents provision them. Fledging occurs 15 to 16 days after hatch.

=== Vocalization ===
The lesser elaenia's dawn song is a "very high, hurried, 'tju-wee tju-weederwee' " whose "wee" notes are higher than the others. It has many calls including "a clear, whistled 'weeééa' " and a "burry 'beer-ta' or 'chí-bur' or 'jwebu' ", and "a longer 'freee' ".

== Status ==
The IUCN has assessed the lesser elaenia as being of Least Concern. It has an extremely large range and its estimated population of at least five million mature individuals is believed to be stable. No immediate threats have been identified. It is considered fairly common on Costa Rica's Pacific slope but uncommon in the center of the country. It is locally common in Colombia, almost unknown in Ecuador, poorly known and patchily distributed in Peru, and mostly uncommon but locally fairly common in Venezuela. It is not well known in the Guianas, rather rare on Trinidad, and rare to fairly common in different parts of Brazil. It occurs in many public and private protected areas. "Dry forests and scrub [are] threatened by fires, cattle browsing, selective logging and slash-and-burn cultivation; in [central] Brazil government incentives to drain wet forests also lead to habitat loss. On other hand, this species is tolerant of converted and secondary habitats, and should be secure."
