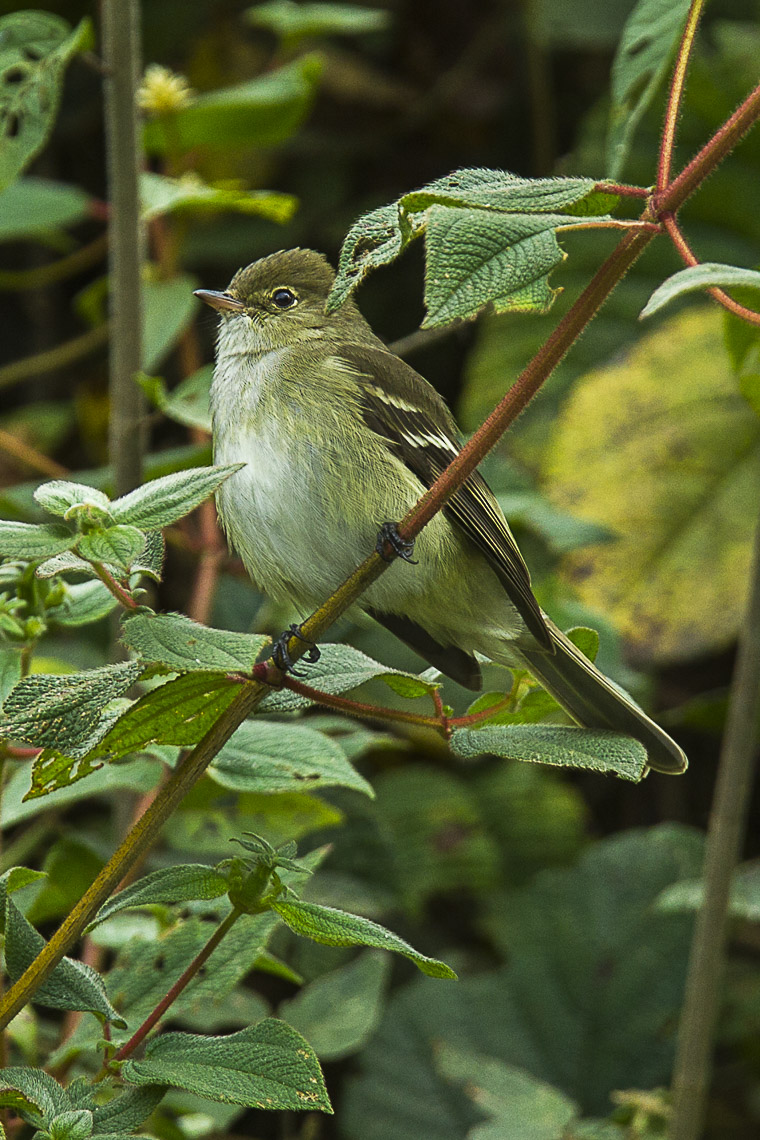
- In Ecuador

Conservation status
- Least Concern (IUCN 3.1)

Scientific classification
- Kingdom: Animalia
- Phylum: Chordata
- Class: Aves
- Order: Passeriformes
- Family: Tyrannidae
- Genus: Elaenia
- Species: E. pallatangae

Binomial name
- Elaenia pallatangae Sclater, PL, 1862

Subspecies
- See text

= Sierran elaenia =

Species of bird

The sierran elaenia (Elaenia pallatangae) is a species of bird in subfamily Elaeniinae of family Tyrannidae, the tyrant flycatchers. It is found in Bolivia, Colombia, Ecuador, and Peru.

== Taxonomy and systematics ==
The sierran elaenia has three subspecies, the nominate E. p. pallatangae (Sclater, 1862). E. p. intensa (Zimmer, 1941), and E. p. exsul (Todd, 1952). For much of the twentieth century what are now the two subspecies of the tepui elaenia (E. olivina) were also treated as subspecies of it. The tepui elaenia was not recognized as a separate species until about 2008 after which taxonomic systems made the change.

== Description ==
The sierran elaenia is 14 to 15 cm (5.5 to 5.9 in) long and weighs about 12 to 18 g (0.42 to 0.63 oz). It is a small elaenia without a crest. The sexes have the same plumage. Adults of the nominate subspecies have an olive head with lighter and yellower cheeks, yellowish lores, a yellowish eyering, and a thin white strip in the center of the crown. Their upperparts are olive. Their wings are dusky olive with paler edges on the flight feathers. The tips of their wing coverts are yellowish white and show as two bars on the closed wing. Their tail is dusky olive. Their chin is whitish, their throat and breast yellowish olive, and their belly and undertail coverts pale yellow. Subspecies E. p. intensa has a lighter crown and more intense yellow underparts than the nominate. E. p. exsul is similar to intensa but has even brighter underparts. Both sexes of all subspecies have a dark brown iris, a black bill with a dull pinkish base to the mandible, and black legs and feet.

== Distribution and habitat ==
The nominate subspecies of the sierran elaenia is found from Valle del Cauca Department in Colombia's Western Andes and Tolima Department in the Central Andes south through Ecuador on both slopes of the Andes into Peru on the west slope as far as Cajamarca Department. Subspecies E. p. intensa is found on the east slope of the Andes in Peru from southern Amazonas Department south to Puno Department. E. p. exsul is found on the east slope of the Andes in Bolivia to Cochabamba Department. The species primarily inhabits scrubby edges and rocky openings in humid montane forest in the subtropical and temperate zones. It also occurs in brushy pastures and secondary forest, especially sites dominated by Melastomataceae. In elevation it ranges from 1,500 to 2,500 m (4,900 to 8,200 ft) in Colombia, 1,500 to 2,800 m (4,900 to 9,200 ft) in Ecuador, and 1,100 to 3,500 m (3,600 to 11,500 ft) in Peru.

== Behavior ==
=== Movement ===
The sierran elaenia is a year-round resident throughout its range.

=== Feeding ===
The sierran elaenia feeds on insects and small fruits, especially those of Melastomataceae and mistletoe (Loranthaceae). It forages at all levels of the forest and often joins mixed-species feeding flocks. It finds food by mostly by gleaning while perched.

=== Breeding ===
The sierran elaenia's breeding season has not been defined but spans at least January to August in Colombia and October to December in Peru. Its nest is a "neat but quite bulky" cup. The clutch is two eggs that are white with a few brown and gray markings. The incubation period, time to fledging, and details of parental care are not known.

=== Vocalization ===
The sierran elaenia's dawn song is "a burry djee'wee interspersed with an occasional sneezy tjrr". Its day song is "a pure rising-falling peew or rising whee?" and its call is "a low djr-djr-djr".

== Status ==
The IUCN has assessed the sierran elaenia as being of Least Concern. It has a large range; its population size is not known and is believed to be stable. No immediate threats have been identified. It is considered common in Colombia and Peru and more common in southern Ecuador than northern. It occurs in several protected areas in every country it inhabits.
