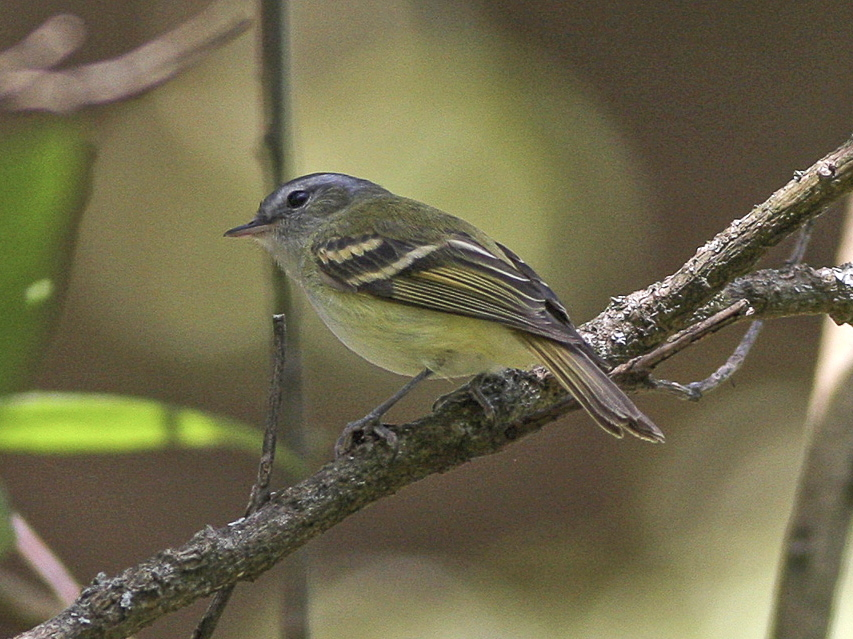
- at Tucumán Province, Argentina

Conservation status
- Least Concern (IUCN 3.1)

Scientific classification
- Kingdom: Animalia
- Phylum: Chordata
- Class: Aves
- Order: Passeriformes
- Family: Tyrannidae
- Genus: Mecocerculus
- Species: M. hellmayri

Binomial name
- Mecocerculus hellmayri Berlepsch, 1907

= Buff-banded tyrannulet =

Species of bird

The buff-banded tyrannulet (Mecocerculus hellmayri) is a species of bird in subfamily Elaeniinae of family Tyrannidae, the tyrant flycatchers. It is found in Argentina, Bolivia, and Peru.

== Taxonomy and systematics ==
The buff-banded tyrannulet is monotypic. It and the white-tailed tyrannulet (M. poecilocercus) form a superspecies.

== Description ==
The buff-banded tyrannulet is about 11 cm (4.3 in) long and weighs 10 to 11 g (0.35 to 0.39 oz). The sexes have the same plumage. Adults have a medium gray crown. They have a thin white supercilium and a faint blackish stripe through the eye on an otherwise whitish face. Their upperparts are mostly greenish olive with an ochraceous olive rump and uppertail coverts. Their wings are dusky with pale buffy yellow edges on the flight feathers. Their wing coverts have pale buff tips that show as two bars on the closed wing. Their tail is dusky olive. Their throat is grayish white, their breast and sides grayish white with a darker but faint grayish wash, and their belly and undertail coverts yellowish white. Both sexes of have a brown iris, a thin and pointed black bill, and medium gray legs and feet.

== Distribution and habitat ==
The buff-banded tyrannulet is found from northern Puno Department in southeastern Peru south through Bolivia into northwestern Argentina's Jujuy Province. It inhabits humid montane evergreen forest in the subtropical zone, especially cloudforest with much moss, and also Podocarpus forest. In elevation it occurs between 1,100 and 2,600 m (3,600 and 8,500 ft) in Bolivia and between 1,500 and 2,300 m (4,900 and 7,500 ft) in Argentina.

== Behavior ==
=== Movement ===
The buff-banded tyrannulet is believed to be a year-round resident throughout its range though it might be only a non-breeding migrant in Peru.

=== Feeding ===
The buff-banded tyrannulet's diet has not been detailed. It usually forages singly and often joins mixed-species feeding flocks. It forages mostly in the forest's mid-story to the canopy. It takes most of its food by gleaning from leaves and twigs while perched, though it occasionally makes short upward flights to briefly hover.

=== Breeding ===
A juvenile buff-banded tyrannulet was recorded in May in Bolivia. Nothing else is known about the species' breeding biology.

=== Vocalization ===
The buff-banded tyrannulet's call is "a plaintive, slightly falling pseee or psee-psee-psee" with two to five notes.

== Status ==
The IUCN has assessed the buff-banded tyrannulet as being of Least Concern. It has a large range; its population size is not known and is believed to be stable. No immediate threats have been identified. It is considered rare in Peru, as either a resident or migrant, and uncommon in Bolivia and Argentina. It occurs in every protected area within its Bolivian and Argentinian range.
