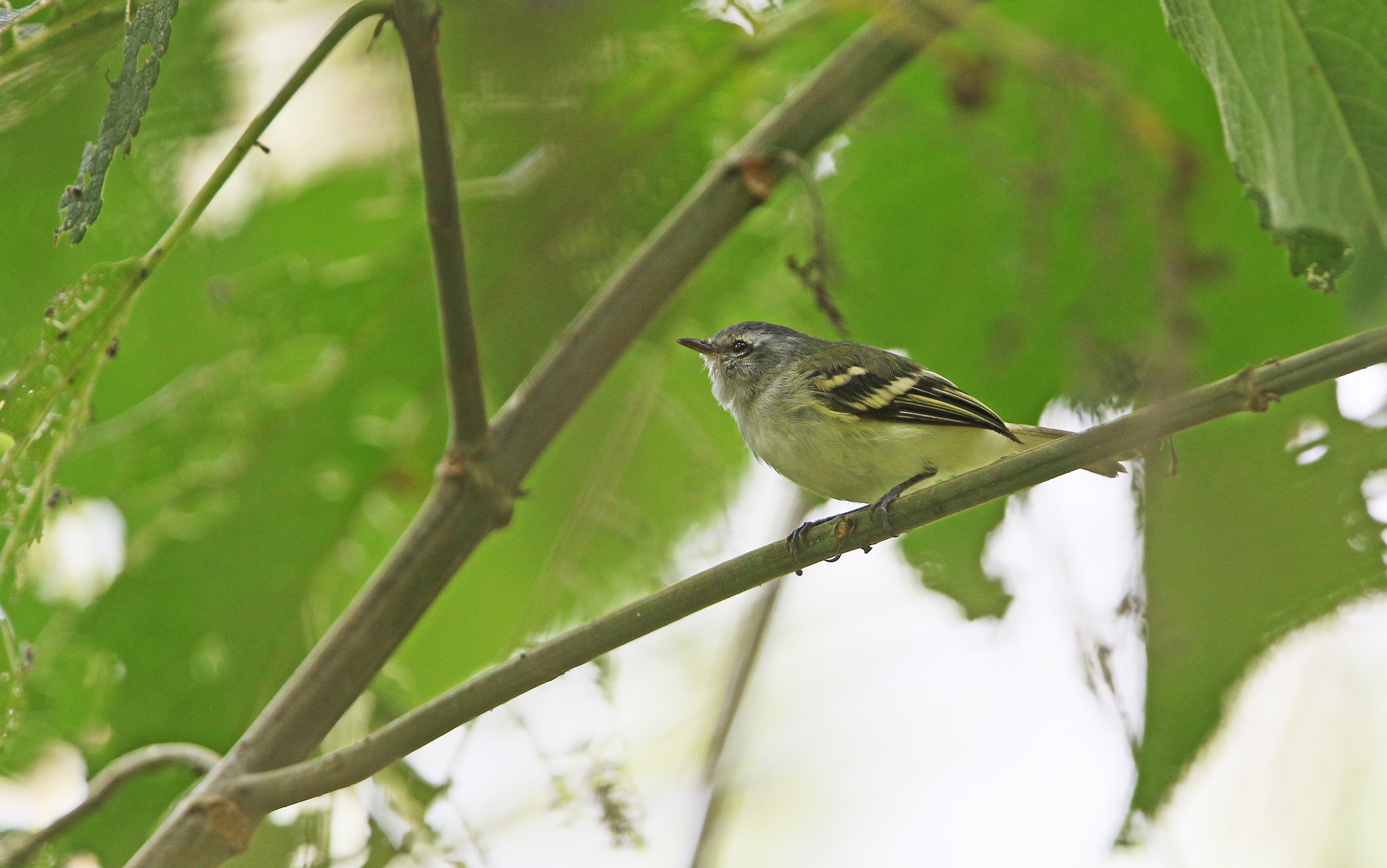

Conservation status
- Least Concern (IUCN 3.1)

Scientific classification
- Kingdom: Animalia
- Phylum: Chordata
- Class: Aves
- Order: Passeriformes
- Family: Tyrannidae
- Genus: Mecocerculus
- Species: M. poecilocercus

Binomial name
- Mecocerculus poecilocercus (Sclater, PL & Salvin, 1873)

= White-tailed tyrannulet =

Species of bird

The white-tailed tyrannulet (Mecocerculus poecilocercus) is a species of bird in subfamily Elaeniinae of family Tyrannidae, the tyrant flycatchers. It is found in Colombia, Ecuador, and Peru.

== Taxonomy and systematics ==
The white-tailed tyrannulet is monotypic. It and the buff-banded tyrannulet (M. hellmayri) form a superspecies.

== Description ==
The white-tailed tyrannulet is about 11 cm (4.3 in) long and weighs 10 to 11 g (0.35 to 0.39 oz). The sexes have the same plumage. Adults have a medium gray crown. They have a thin white supercilium and a faint blackish stripe through the eye on an otherwise whitish face. Their upperparts are mostly greenish olive with a bright greenish yellow rump and uppertail coverts. Their wings are dusky with pale yellow edges on the flight feathers. Their wing coverts have white to pale buff tips that show as two bars on the closed wing. Their tail is dusky olive with a mostly to fully white outermost pair of feathers. Their throat is grayish white, their breast and sides grayish white with a darker grayish wash, and their belly and undertail coverts yellowish white. Both sexes of have a brown iris, a thin and pointed black bill, and medium gray legs and feet.

== Distribution and habitat ==
The white-tailed tyrannulet is found in the Andes from northern Colombia south on both slopes through Ecuador and into Peru. On the west slope in Peru it is found only in Piura Department; on the east slope it reaches to Cuzco Department. It inhabits humid montane evergreen forest in the subtropical zone, especially cloudforest with much moss. In elevation it occurs between 1,800 and 2,800 m (5,900 and 9,200 ft) in Colombia, between 1,500 and 2,500 m (4,900 and 8,200 ft) in Ecuador, and between 1,450 and 2,700 m (4,800 and 8,900 ft) in Peru.

== Behavior ==
=== Movement ===
The white-tailed tyrannulet is a year-round resident throughout its range.

=== Feeding ===
The white-tailed tyrannulet feeds mostly on insects but also includes some small fruits in its diet. It usually forages in pairs or small groups and frequently joins mixed-species feeding flocks. It forages mostly in the forest canopy and somewhat lower at its edges. It takes most of its food by gleaning from leaves, twigs, and tree-ferns while perched, though it occasionally makes short upward flights to briefly hover.

=== Breeding ===
The white-tailed tyrannulet's breeding season in Colombia appears to include August and September but nothing else is known about the species' breeding biology.

=== Vocalization ===
The white-tailed tyrannulet's dawn song is "a high, lisping pseeee-psweet". Its day song is "a descending series of high, rising, sibilant whistles: PSEE pswee pswee psweet" that sometimes ends with "sharper pit notes".

== Status ==
The IUCN has assessed the white-tailed tyrannulet as being of Least Concern. It has a large range; its population size is not known and is believed to be stable. No immediate threats have been identified. It is considered uncommon in Colombia, "numerous" in Ecuador, and fairly common in Peru. It occurs in protected areas in Ecuador and Peru.
