= Mourner (bird) =

Mourner is the common name used for several Neotropical birds from families Tityridae and Tyrannidae.

== Species ==
- Tityridae:
  - genus Schiffornis.
    - Varzea mourner (Schiffornis major); alternatively greater schiffornis.
    - Thrush-like mourner (Schiffornis turdina); alternatively thrush-like schiffornis.
    - Greenish mourner (Schiffornis virescens); alternatively greenish schiffornis.
  - genus Laniocera.
    - Speckled mourner (Laniocera rufescens).
    - Cinereous mourner (Laniocera hypopyrra).
  - genus Laniisoma.
    - Elegant mourner (Laniisoma elegans); alternatively shrike-like cotinga/laniisoma.
      - Brazilian laniisoma (Laniisoma (elegans) elegans).
      - Andean laniisoma (Laniisoma (elegans) buckleyi).
- Tyrannidae:
  - genus Rhytipterna.
    - Pale-bellied mourner (Rhytipterna immunda).
    - Greyish mourner (Rhytipterna simplex).
    - Rufous mourner (Rhytipterna holerythra).
