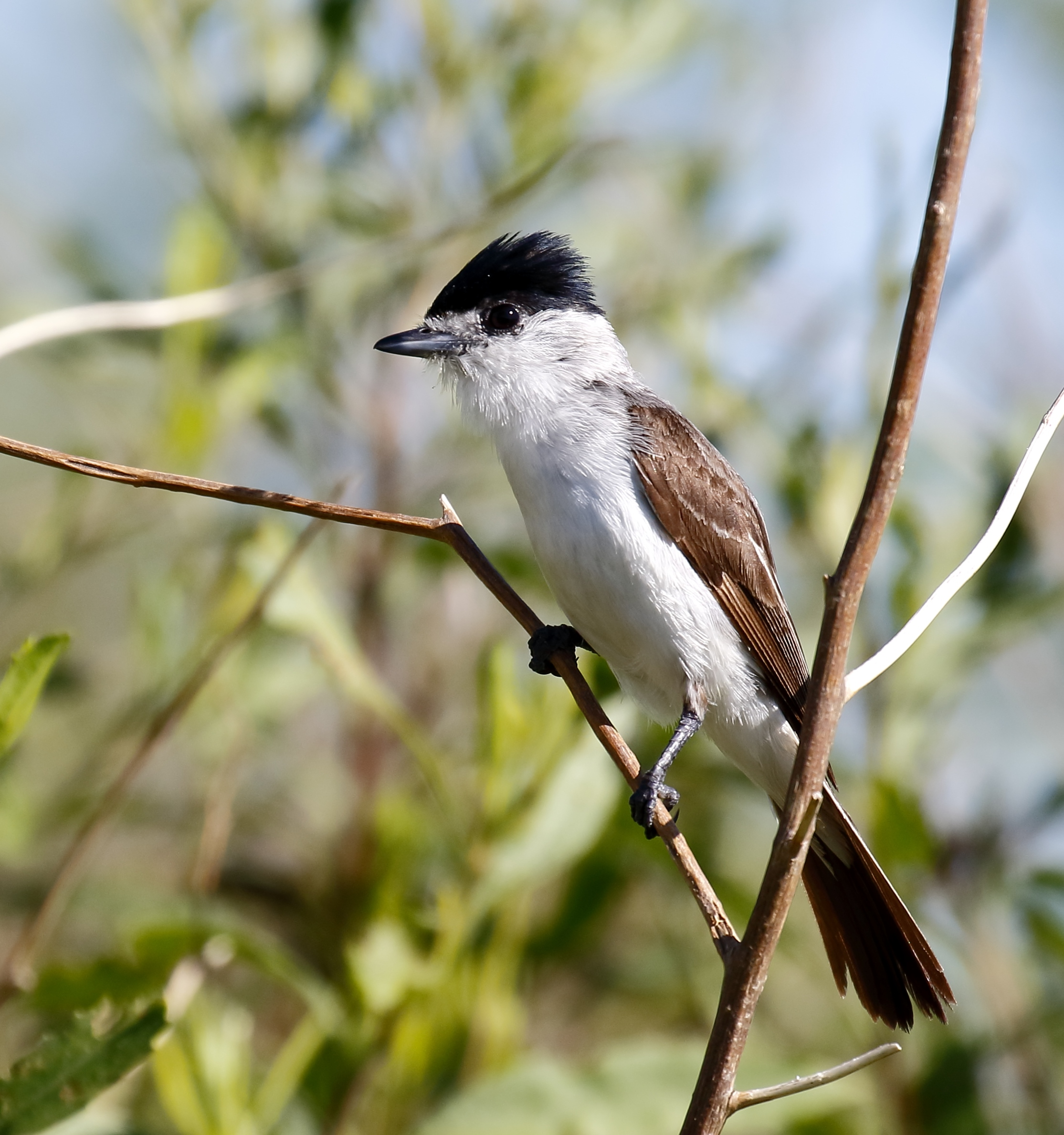
- Adult, Santa Fe Province, Argentina

Conservation status
- Least Concern (IUCN 3.1)

Scientific classification
- Kingdom: Animalia
- Phylum: Chordata
- Class: Aves
- Order: Passeriformes
- Family: Tityridae
- Genus: Xenopsaris; Ridgway, 1891
- Species: X. albinucha

Binomial name
- Xenopsaris albinucha (Burmeister, 1869)
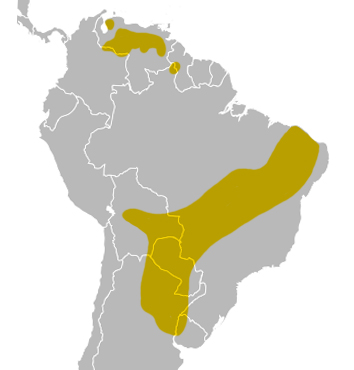
- Range in yellow

Synonyms
- Pachyrhamphus albinucha protonym

= White-naped xenopsaris =

Species of bird in South America

The white-naped xenopsaris (/ˌwaɪt ˌneɪpt ˌziːnəpˈzɑːrɪs, -ˌzɛnəp-/; Xenopsaris albinucha), also known as the reed becard and white-naped becard, is a species of suboscine bird in the family Tityridae, the only member of the genus Xenopsaris. It is found in South America, in humid subtropical and tropical savanna climates in most of the countries east of the Andes: Venezuela, Brazil, Bolivia, Paraguay, Uruguay, and Argentina. Living in open woodland and other open forest habitats, it is mostly sedentary, though some populations may be migratory. The species, which is closely related to becards and tityras, was thought to be either a tyrant-flycatcher or cotinga, before it was placed in Tityridae.

The bird is 12.5 to 13 cm (4.9–5.1 in) in length, with whitish undersides, a black crown, and grey-brown upperparts. The sexes are similar in appearance, though the females have duller upperparts. It feeds on insects in the foliage of trees and bushes, and sometimes on the ground. Nesting occurs in a simple cup nest placed in the fork of a tree. Both parents incubate the eggs and help feed the chicks. When the chicks fledge, the parents may divide up the brood to continue helping. The species is not common and little is known about it, but it is not considered in danger of extinction, and has been classified as of least concern by the International Union for Conservation of Nature.

== Taxonomy and systematics ==
The white-naped xenopsaris was described in 1869 by the German-Argentine scientist Hermann Burmeister, based on a specimen collected near Buenos Aires. Burmeister originally placed it in the becard genus, Pachyramphus. It was moved to the monotypic genus Xenopsaris by Robert Ridgway in 1891, but was still known to be closely related to Pachyramphus. A 1989 study of anatomy identified Pachyramphus as a sister taxon to Xenopsaris, but the white-naped xenopsaris was kept in its own genus due to several morphological and behavioural differences, namely its smaller size, the shape of its legs, the length of its primary flight feathers, the lack of strong sexual dimorphism (differences between the sexes) and the construction of the nest.

Which family the species belonged to remained unresolved for over a century. According to the Handbook of the Birds of the World, Xenopsaris and its allies were "taxonomically problematic genera that have for more than a hundred years been shifted back and forth between the cotingas (Cotingidae) and the Tyrannidae". When placed with the tyrant-flycatchers, Tyrannidae, it was considered closely related to the genera Suiriri, Serpophaga and Knipolegus. The uncertainty was not confined to this species, as there was a general confusion about where to draw the lines between the cotingas, tyrant-flycatchers and manakins.

Resolution was provided by the same 1989 study that confirmed the link between Xenopsaris and Pachyramphus. In it, Xenopsaris and six other genera previously held in the three families were found to actually form a fourth family, later named Tityridae. This new family is where the genus is now placed by the South American Classification Committee of the American Ornithological Society. A 2007 study of mitochondrial DNA confirmed the white-naped xenopsaris' place in the Tityridae, and its close relationship to Pachyramphus, as well as the genus Tityra. These three genera were found to be more distantly related to a fourth genus Iodopleura (the purpletufts), although further studies are needed to understand the complete relationship between these four genera.

The genus name Xenopsaris was derived from the Ancient Greek word xeno, meaning "stranger", and Psaris, a synonym for Tityra, based on the Ancient Greek for starling, described by Georges Cuvier in 1817. The specific name albinucha is from Latin and refers to the bird's white (albus) nape (nuchus). The species is also known as the reed becard, white-naped becard and simply xenopsaris.

There are two subspecies of white-naped xenopsaris; the widespread nominate subspecies, and the more restricted X. a. minor of Venezuela, which was described by Carl Eduard Hellmayr in 1920.

== Description ==
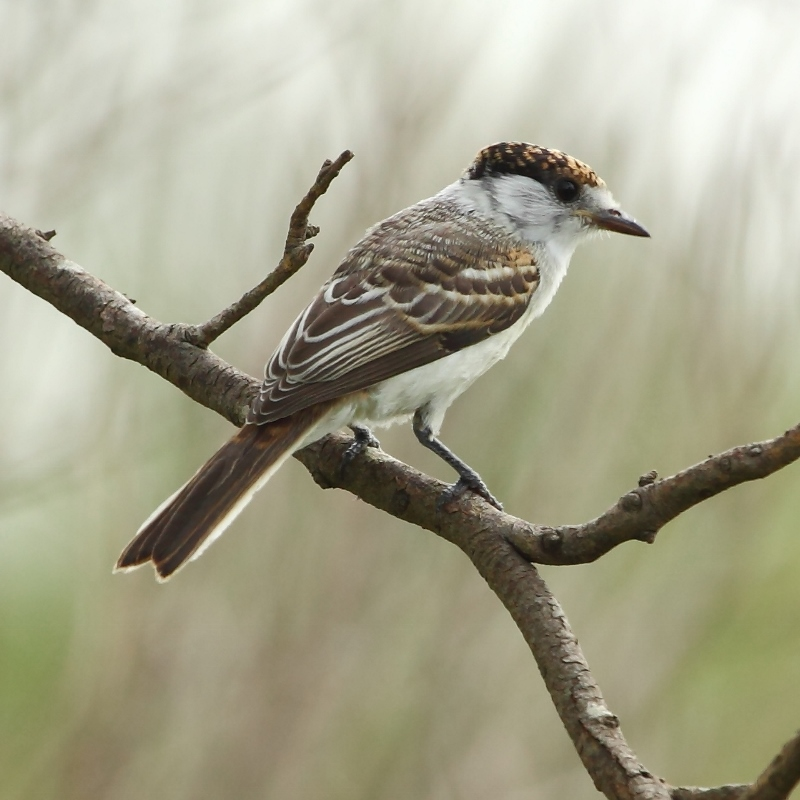
Juveniles have different plumage to the adults.

The white-naped xenopsaris is smaller than the closely related becards and tityras, measuring 12.5 to 13 cm (4.9–5.1 in) in length and weighing around 10 g (0.35 oz). The subspecies X. a. minor has the same plumage as the nominate subspecies, but is smaller; the wing-chord (measurement from the wrist-joint to the end of the wing) length of the nominate subspecies, for example, is 6.4 to 6.6 cm (2.5–2.6 in) compared to 6.0 to 6.2 cm (2.4–2.4 in) in X. a. minor.

The face, lores, throat, breast, belly and rump of this species are white; the undersides are tinged with grey on the chest and yellow on the belly. The crown is glossy black in males. The nape is pale grey with a grey-white to white band separating the crown from the back. The wings are dusky greyish brown with white edging on the inner remiges and wing-coverts. The tail is dusky brown, and the stout bill, iris and legs are black. The female is similar to the male, but is duller overall and has a chestnut-tinged crown. Juvenile birds resemble adults but have greyish napes and more chestnut in the crown, and the feathers of the back, rump and primaries are scalloped with ochre. The secondaries on the wing and the tail feathers are edged with white.

The song of this species is delicate, and does not carry far. It is most commonly heard during the rainy season, but can be heard at any time of the day. The call is described as a thin, high-pitched and hesitant "teep, tre'e'e'e'e'a eea wu'u'u'e'e'e-e-e-e-e-p" or a "twip, tsiweeé, tseee, ti-ti-ti-ti", according to the Handbook of the Birds of the World. The initial trill is described as rising and then falling, and the last trill is described as long. Birds may sometimes vary the pattern and only use part of the song. The species is also described as making a squeaky and undulating screech, and males are described as whistling on the nest. Foraging males have been observed making an ascending "shreee" every few seconds while hunting for insects.

The white-naped xenopsaris looks somewhat similar to the cinereous becard, which overlaps its range in Venezuela. The white-naped xenopsaris is smaller, with a longer tail, thinner bill, whiter underparts (instead of grey) and browner upperparts (rather than greyish) .

== Distribution and habitat ==
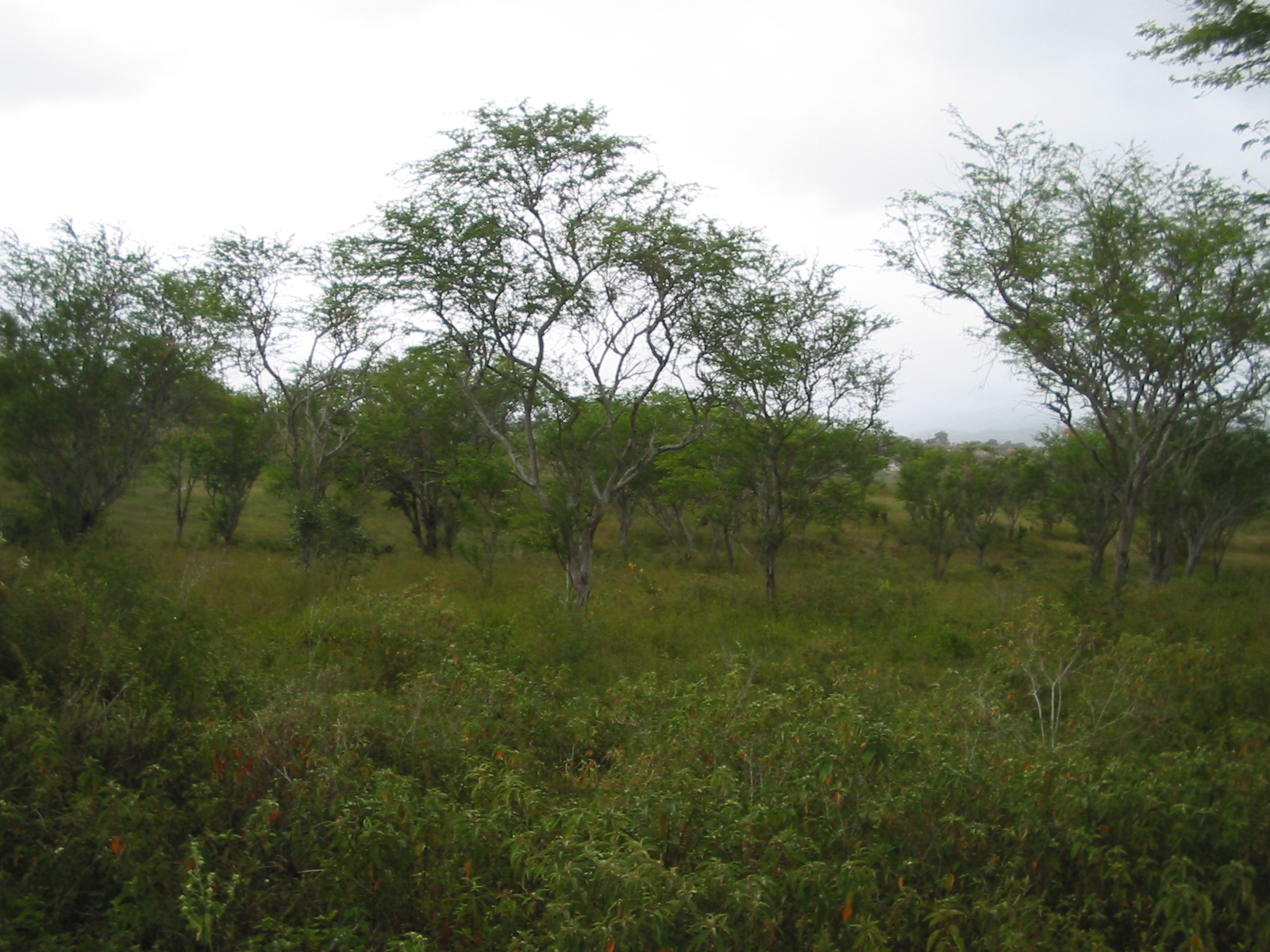
Caatinga, one of the habitats used by this species

The white-naped xenopsaris has a disjunct distribution. The southern population of the nominate subspecies is widespread from north-eastern Brazil through to Bolivia, Paraguay and northern Argentina and Uruguay. A separate population of the nominate is found in Guyana. The subspecies X. a. minor is found in west and central Venezuela, and probably extends into north-eastern Colombia.

The species is generally resident across its range, but sightings of solitary and silent birds have suggested that the species may be migratory in Bolivia and Brazil. A study published in 2005 suggested it was migratory in Santa Fe, Argentina, as the species was not observed in the area between March and September (the austral winter). In 2006 the species was reported for the first time in Peru, but it was unclear if this represented a vagrant escaping cold weather or a migrant, as the species is mostly uncommon across its range and that area is poorly studied ornithologically.

They occupy a variety of habitats across their range, including Caatinga scrubland, riparian (river) woodland, lightly wooded areas, the borders of open gallery forest and open areas with scattered trees. They usually live near water or damp areas, and range from sea-level to 550 m (1,800 ft).

== Behaviour ==
=== Diet and feeding ===
The white-naped xenopsaris feeds on insects, but no studies have yet been done on the diet of adults. Chicks in the nest are fed grasshoppers from the family Acrididae, mantidflies, praying mantises and mosquitoes. Adults typically hunt singly or sometimes in pairs, and breeding pairs can often be observed hunting well apart from each other. They are shy, generally quiet and inconspicuous. They typically hunt from a perch on the outer edge of the foliage of trees, watching for prey and then launching themselves 0.5 to 1.5 m (1.6–4.9 ft) to snatch prey off leaves. They also strike from a hovering position above foliage, and may chase prey acrobatically for some distance. They often feed near the ground and sometimes take prey from the ground as well as from vegetation.

=== Breeding ===
The species is territorial, with the males defending the territory. Nesting timing varies by location; in Venezuela it is reported to occur during the rainy season (June to September), and in Argentina during the austral summer (October to January). The nests are cup-shaped, 4.5 cm (1.8 in) across, 4 cm (1.6 in) high and 1.8 cm (0.71 in) deep. Nests have been recorded being constructed from fine dry grass, or woven plant fibre and a few rootlets. Nests are placed in the forks of branches 4 to 15 m (13–49 ft) up in trees 15 to 20 m (49–66 ft) tall. The clutch size is three eggs, which are greenish with brown spots. Both sexes incubate the eggs during the 14–15 day brooding period. The species has been described as very tame during this interval – staying on the nest even as researchers came within a few centimetres of the bird – but were very aggressive in attacking birds, like guira cuckoos, or other animals that came near the nest. The hatchlings are dark-skinned with grey down and pink mouths. Pink mouths in chicks are very unusual in suboscines.

Chicks hatch within 24 hours of each other. Six days after hatching, the chicks' eyes have opened and after eight days they are covered in whitish down. Chicks defecate outside of the nest by raising their tail to the side of the nest, so nests with older chicks are surrounded by faecal matter. Both parents feed and brood the chicks, taking it in turns. When one parent returns with food, it takes over brooding duties while the other leaves to hunt.

The chicks are fed by the parents for several days after fledging. The family may travel as a group or the parents may divide the brood, taking one or two chicks each.

== Conservation status ==
Across its range, the white-naped xenopsaris is uncommon and patchily distributed. It has not been evaluated as threatened by the IUCN Red List, as it does not meet any of the criteria. The population is evaluated as being stable, as there is no evidence of any decline or extreme fluctuations. It also occupies an enormous range, estimated to be 11 million km^{2} (4.2 million sq mi). For these reasons, it is evaluated as a species of least concern.
