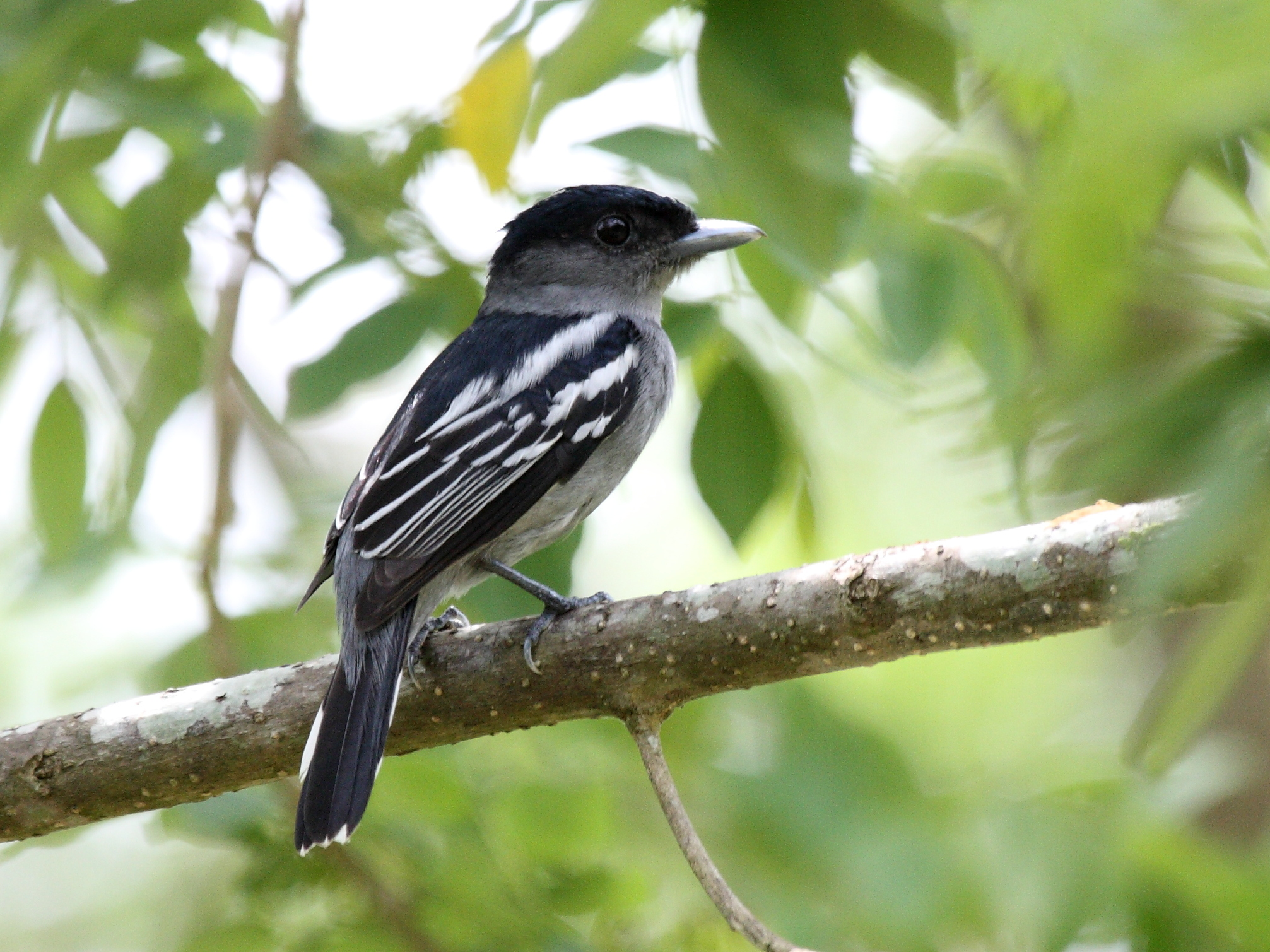
- Male Pachyramphus polychopterus similis in Panama

Conservation status
- Least Concern (IUCN 3.1)

Scientific classification
- Kingdom: Animalia
- Phylum: Chordata
- Class: Aves
- Order: Passeriformes
- Family: Tityridae
- Genus: Pachyramphus
- Species: P. polychopterus

Binomial name
- Pachyramphus polychopterus (Vieillot, 1818)

= White-winged becard =

Species of bird

The white-winged becard (Pachyramphus polychopterus) is a species of bird in the family Tityridae, the tityras, becards, and allies. It is found in every Central American country except El Salvador, on Trinidad and Tobago, and in every mainland South American country except Chile.

== Taxonomy and systematics ==
The white-winged becard was originally described in 1818 as Platyrhynchos polychopterus. It was eventually reassigned to genus Pachyramphus that the English zoologist George Robert Gray erected in 1839.

The genus Pachyramphus has variously been assigned to the tyrant flycatcher family Tyrannidae and the cotinga family Cotingidae. Several early twenty-first century studies confirmed the placement of Pachyramphus in Tityridae and taxonomic systems made the reassignment. In 1998 the American Ornithological Society was unsure where to place the genus and listed its members as incertae sedis but in 2011 moved them to Tityridae.

The white-winged becard has these eight subspecies:

- P. p. similis Cherrie, 1891
- P. p. cinereiventris Sclater, PL, 1862
- P. p. dorsalis Sclater, PL, 1862
- P. p. tristis (Kaup, 1852)
- P. p. tenebrosus Zimmer, JT, 1936
- P. p. nigriventris Sclater, PL, 1857
- P. p. polychopterus (Vieillot, 1818)
- P. p. spixii (Swainson, 1838)

Some of the subspecies were originally described as species, and significant plumage and vocal differences among the subspecies suggest that some should be again treated as full species.

== Description ==
The white-winged becard is 14 to 15.5 cm (5.5 to 6.1 in) long and weighs 19.5 to 21 g (0.69 to 0.74 oz). Adult males of the nominate subspecies P. p. polychopterus have a glossy black to almost bluish crown and nape. Their face is slate-gray below the crown and the color wraps around the back of their neck. Their back is mostly glossy black to almost bluish with slate-gray uppertail coverts. Their wings are mostly black with wide white edges on the coverts that show as two wing bars. The wing's secondaries and tertials also have wide white edges. Their tail is long and mostly black with wide white tips on all the feathers except the central pair. Their throat and underparts are mostly slate-gray with a paler belly. Adult females have a brown-olive crown, a pale whitish strip above the lores, and a partial white eye-ring on an otherwise pale yellowish face. Their upperparts are brownish olive to greenish olive. Their wings have wide buff-cinnamon edges on the scapulars, coverts, and inner flight feathers. Their tail is blackish with wide buff-cinnamon tips on the feathers. Their throat is grayish yellow and their underparts pale yellowish with an olive tinge on the breast and sides.

The other subspecies of the white-winged becard differ from the nominate and each other thus:

- P. p. similis: (male) black head and upperparts and medium gray underparts with white speckles on the belly
- P. p. cinereiventris (male) more white on the wings than nominate, with pale gray neck, rump, and underparts (female) more olivaceous upperparts than nominate
- P. p. dorsalis: (male) rather like cinereiventris but much paler underparts
- P. p. tristis: (male) black head and upperparts and slaty gray underparts with white speckles on the belly
- P. p. tenebrosus (male) black head and upperparts and sooty black underparts with white wing bars and white tips on outer tail feathers (female) more rufescent underparts than nominate
- P. p. nigriventris: (male) almost entirely black with white edges on wing coverts and tips of tail feathers (female) grayish olive upperparts
- P. p. spixii (male) shiny black head and upperparts, white wing bars, pale gray edges on flight feathers, and gray underparts

All subspecies have a dark iris, a blackish or silver-gray bill with a black tip, and dark gray or plumbeous legs and feet.

== Distribution and habitat ==
The white-winged becard has the largest range of all Pachyramphus species. The subspecies are found thus:

- P. p. similis: from southern Belize and central Guatemala south on the Caribbean slope through Honduras and both the Caribbean and Pacific slopes through Nicaragua, Costa Rica, and Panama slightly into far northwestern Colombia's Chocó Department
- P. p. cinereiventris: northern Colombia except far northern Chocó east to Magdalena and Cesar departments
- P. p. dorsalis: central and southwestern Colombia from Antioquia and Cundinamarca departments south into northwestern Ecuador as far as Pichincha Province
- P. p. tristis: Trinidad and Tobago; from northeastern Colombia east of the Andes east across Venezuela but for Cerro Duida, and across the Guianas and northeastern Brazil from Roraima to the Atlantic in Maranhão
- P. p. tenebrosus: from southeastern Colombia's Nariño to Amazonas departments south through eastern Ecuador into northeastern Peru through Loreto Department into San Martín Department
- P. p. nigriventris: from western Meta Department in southeastern Colombia south through eastern Peru south of the Marañón River to Ucayali Department and northern Bolivia and southeast into western Brazil along the upper Amazon to the Nhamundá and Madeira rivers
- P. p. polychopterus: eastern Brazil from Piauí and Ceará south to Alagoas and Bahia
- P. p. spixii: far southeastern Peru; northwestern Bolivia east across southern Brazil and south through Paraguay, Uruguay, and northern Argentina to Buenos Aires Province

The white-winged becard inhabits a wide variety of landscapes in the tropical and lower subtropical zones. Most of them are somewhat open, including the edges and clearings of evergreen forest, gallery and riparian forest, secondary forest, shaded plantations, and river islands. It sometimes occurs in mangroves and in re-growing várzea forest. In elevation it ranges from sea level to 1,100 m (3,600 ft) in northern Central America, to 1,200 m (3,900 ft) in Costa Rica, to 1,300 m (4,300 ft) in Colombia, to 900 m (3,000 ft) in eastern Ecuador, and ranges between 600 and 1,500 m (2,000 and 4,900 ft) in northwestern Ecuador. It reaches 1,200 m (3,900 ft) and locally 1,500 m (4,900 ft) in Peru, 1,900 m (6,200 ft) in Venezuela, and mostly to 1,500 m (4,900 ft) but locally higher in Brazil.

== Behavior ==
=== Movement ===
The white-winged becard is a year-round resident in most of its range; the far southern population moves north after the breeding season. This movement is ill defined except that the species occurs in far southeastern Peru only in the austral winter.

=== Feeding ===
The white-winged becard feeds on large insects such as beetles and leafhoppers, spiders, and "considerable amounts" of small berries. It typically forages singly or in pairs and frequently joins mixed-species feeding flocks. It perches from the forest's mid-story to the canopy and gleans most food with a sally from a perch that occasionally includes a short hover. It sometimes forages in the lower strata as well.

=== Breeding ===
The white-winged becard's breeding season has not been fully defined but varies according to latitude. It includes August to April in Costa Rica, March to August in Colombia, March to September in Trinidad and January on Tobago, August and September in Venezuela, and November to February in Argentina. The species' nest is a bulky globe with a side entrance, made from grass, plant fibers, Spanish moss, and other plant material lined with grass and leaves. It is usually wedged in a branch fork and fairly well hidden in foliage. Nests have been found between about 4 and 38 m (15 and 125 ft) above the ground. The clutch is two to four eggs that the female alone incubates. The incubation period is about 18 to 21 days and fledging occurs about 21 days after hatch. Both parents provision nestlings.

=== Vocalization ===
The white-winged becard's song in Costa Rica is described as "a fast series of sweet chew notes, the first followed by a slight pause". In eastern Ecuador it sings "a pretty and melodic series of mellow notes, e.g. teu, teu, tu-tu-tu-tu-tu-tu" and in the west a slower "teu, teu, teu, teu, ti-teu, teu". In Venezuela it sings "a soft, warbled teeur, tur-tur-tur-turtur? [and] a weak tew te tu tu tu". Its song in Brazil is a "high, mellow, waderlike tih ti-ti-tjuh (ti-ti higher) or tjew-tjew-tjew-tjeé".

== Status ==
The IUCN has assessed the white-winged becard as being of Least Concern. It has an extremely large range and its estimated population of at least five million mature individuals is believed to be stable. No immediate threats have been identified. It is considered "uncommon to rare" in northern Central America and "fairly uncommon" in most of Costa Rica but rare in the northwest. It is "fairly common" in Colombia, "one of the most common and widespread Amazonian becards" in Peru, "common" in Venezuela, and "common to frequent" in Brazil. It is "[t]olerant of converted and secondary habitats, and occurs in many national parks and other protected areas throughout its range".
