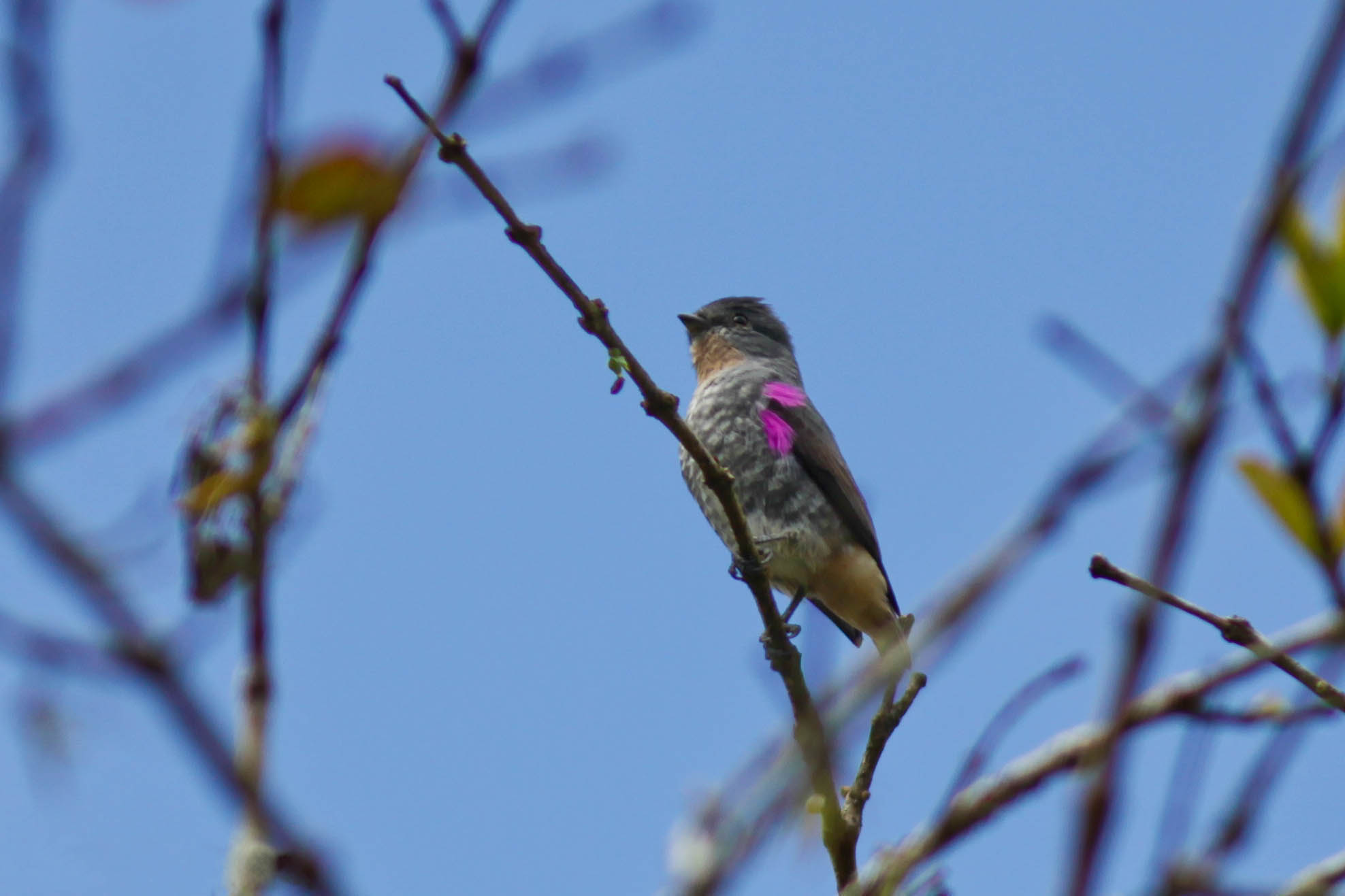
- Adult male
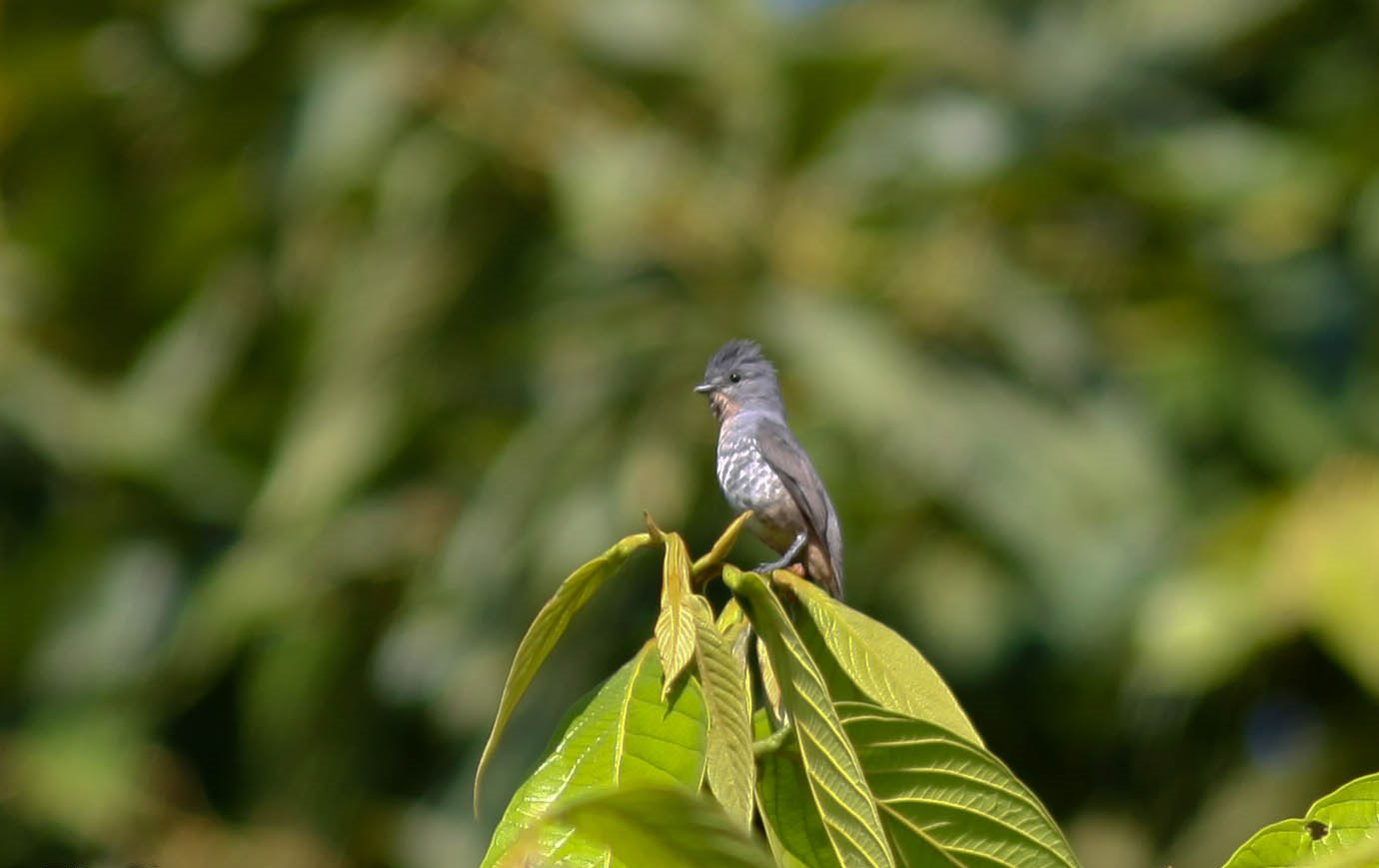

Conservation status
- Endangered (IUCN 3.1)

Scientific classification
- Kingdom: Animalia
- Phylum: Chordata
- Class: Aves
- Order: Passeriformes
- Family: Tityridae
- Genus: Iodopleura
- Species: I. pipra

Binomial name
- Iodopleura pipra (Lesson, 1831)

= Buff-throated purpletuft =

Species of bird

The buff-throated purpletuft (Iodopleura pipra) is a small Endangered species of bird in the family Tityridae, the tityras, becards, and allies. It is endemic to Brazil.

== Taxonomy and systematics ==
The buff-throated purpletuft was originally described in 1831 as Pardalotus pipra, mistakenly placing it in the pardalote family of Australia. It was later assigned to genus Iodopleura. Well into the twentieth century authors placed that genus in Cotingidae. Several early twenty-first century studies confirmed the placement of Iodopleura in Tityridae and taxonomic systems made the reassignment. The buff-throated purpletuft shares genus Iodopleura with the dusky purpletuft (I. fusca) and the white-browed purpletuft (I. isabellae).

The buff-throated purpletuft has two subspecies, the nominate I. p. pipra (Lesson, 1831) and I. p. leucopygia (Salvin, 1885).

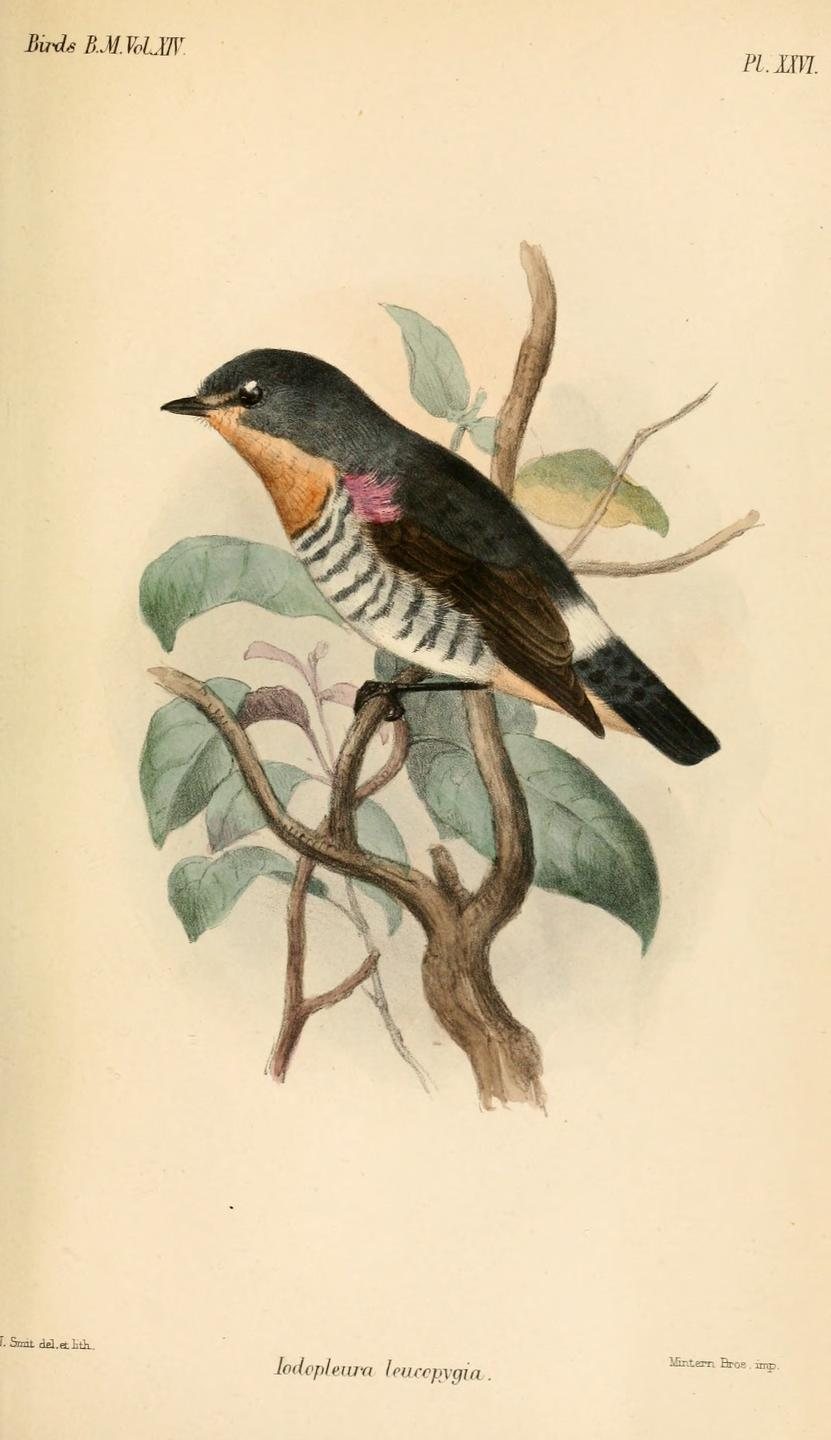
Male I. p. leucopygia, illustration by Joseph Smit, 1888

== Description ==
The buff-throated purpletuft is 8.7 to 10.5 cm (3.4 to 4.1 in) long; two individuals weighed 9.6 and 10.5 g (0.34 and 0.37 oz). The sexes have almost the same plumage. They have long wings, a short tail, and a wide bill with a hooked tip. Adults of the nominate subspecies have a pale gray supercilium, a dusky line through the eye, and a broken white eye-ring on an otherwise gray face. Their crown is a darker gray than their face. Their upperparts are mostly gray with a white rump. Their wings are mostly dusky to blackish with dusky coverts. Their tail is dusky to blackish. Their chin has a narrow white band. Their throat and upper breast are cinnamon-buff. They are mottled gray across the breast and along their sides, their belly is white, and their undertail coverts cinnamon-buff. Males have a small tuft of purple feathers on their upper flank; females have no tufts. Subspecies I. p. leucopygia has a larger white rump band and a purer buff throat than the nominate. Both sexes of both subspecies have a dark brown iris, a black bill with a lead-gray base to the mandible, and dark lead-gray legs. Juveniles have white tips on their dark feathers.

== Distribution and habitat ==
The buff-throated purpletuft has a disjunct distribution on the coast of eastern and southeastern Brazil. Subspecies I. p. leucopygia is the more northerly of the two. It is found intermittently from Paraíba south to northeastern Minas Gerais. The nominate is found somewhat more nearly continuously from Espírito Santo south to Paraná. There are also scattered records outside these core ranges. It is a bird of the Atlantic Forest, where it inhabits primary and secondary forest, cocoa plantations with a forest overcover, and clearings with some trees. "There is some evidence that the species may be associated with a single species of tall, fine-leafed leguminous tree, which is widespread and locally common, and often supports the clumps of mistletoe on which it primarily feeds." In elevation it is almost always found below 1,000 m (3,300 ft).

== Behavior ==
=== Movement ===
Though the buff-throated purpletuft is generally considered a year-round resident, there is some evidence of elevational movements.

=== Feeding ===
The buff-throated purpletuft appears to feed mostly on the berries of mistletoe (Loranthaceae) but also feeds on other fruits and on insects. It forages in the forest canopy and takes insects above it. It plucks fruit both while perched and with a sally from a perch; insects are taken while perched and in mid-air.

=== Breeding ===
The nominate subspecies of the buff-throated purpletuft appears to breed between July and October. The breeding season of subspecies I. p. leucopygia has not been defined but includes May. The species' nest is a tiny cup apparently made mostly from lichens and saddled on a horizontal branch. The female alone appears to build it. The clutch is one egg. The incubation period and time to fledging are not known. Both adults provision nestlings.

=== Vocalization ===
The buff-throated purpletuft's song is an "extr. high weeh-zwee, 1st note slightly higher and longer".

== Status ==
The IUCN originally in 1988 assessed the buff-throated purpletuft as Threatened, then in 1994 as Vulnerable, in 2000 as Endangered, in 2004 as Near Threatened, and since 2016 again as Endangered. It has a restricted and fragmented range and its estimated population of between 1000 and 2500 mature individuals is believed to be decreasing. "Loss of Atlantic forest is the main threat, since this habitat is rapidly being logged, mostly for agricultural and real-estate development. Possible migratory movements to adjacent montane areas in the austral summer will be disrupted by the increasing fragmentation of Atlantic forest." "The Buff-throated Purpletuft is protected under Brazilian law, and it is present in a number of protected areas...Protection of forest at Murici (Alagoas) would greatly benefit this and other globally threatened species".
