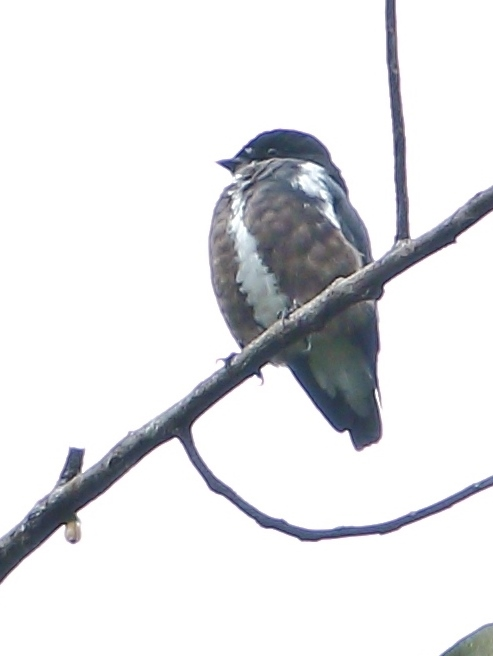
- female at Presidente Figueiredo, Amazonas state, Brazil

Conservation status
- Least Concern (IUCN 3.1)

Scientific classification
- Kingdom: Animalia
- Phylum: Chordata
- Class: Aves
- Order: Passeriformes
- Family: Tityridae
- Genus: Iodopleura
- Species: I. fusca

Binomial name
- Iodopleura fusca (Vieillot, 1817)

= Dusky purpletuft =

Species of bird

The dusky purpletuft (Iodopleura fusca) is a small species of bird in the family Tityridae, the tityras, becards, and allies. It is found in Brazil, French Guiana, Guyana, Suriname, and Venezuela.

== Taxonomy and systematics ==
The dusky purpletuft was originally described in 1817 as Ampelis fusca. It was later assigned to genus Iodopleura. Well into the twentieth century authors placed that genus in Cotingidae. Several early twenty-first century studies confirmed the placement of Iodopleura in Tityridae and taxonomic systems made the reassignment.

The dusky purpletuft shares genus Iodopleura with the buff-throated purpletuft (I. pipra) and the white-browed purpletuft (I. isabellae). The white-browed and dusky purpletufts form a superspecies and might be conspecific.

The dusky purpletuft is monotypic.

== Description ==
The dusky purpletuft is about 11 cm (4.3 in) long; one male weighed 15.3 g (0.54 oz). The sexes have almost the same plumage. They have long wings, a short tail, and a wide bill with a hooked tip. Adults have a mostly slaty blackish head, back, wings, and tail. They have a white band on the rump. Their underparts are smoky brown with white down the center. Males have a small tuft of violet feathers on their upper flank; females' tufts are white. Both sexes have a dark brown iris, a black maxilla, a lead-gray mandible, and dark lead-gray legs. Juveniles have white tips on their dark feathers.

== Distribution and habitat ==
The dusky purpletuft is found in far eastern and southeastern Bolívar state in eastern Venezuela, east across the Guianas, and possibly slightly into northeastern Brazil's Amapá state. There are also a few scattered records south near the Brazilian city of Manaus. It inhabits the canopy and edges of humid forest up to an elevation of 500 m (1,600 ft).

== Behavior ==
=== Movement ===
The dusky purpletuft is believed to be a year-round resident.

=== Feeding ===
The dusky purpletuft feeds primarily on insects and also includes some fruit in its diet. It takes insects in mid-air with a sally from a treetop. Nothing else is known about its diet or feeding behavior.

=== Breeding ===
The dusky purpletuft's breeding season has not been defined but appears to begin in December in French Guiana, when observers noted a female building a nest. It was a very small cone that appeared to straddle a horizontal branch somewhat below the top of a 20 m (65 ft) tall tree. By late January the nest was gone, possibly due to heavy rains and wind. After this date the female began another nest on the remains of the first one.

=== Vocalization ===
The dusky purpletuft makes "[s]oft trilled notes and high, thin notes" that are similar to those of the white-browed purpletuft, which see here.

== Status ==
The IUCN has assessed the dusky purpletuft as being of Least Concern. It has a large range; its population size is not known and is believed to be decreasing. No immediate threats have been identified. It is known in Venezuela only from two specimens and a few sight records and is rare in Brazil. It is "probably under-recorded owing to difficulty of observation of small treetop birds in areas of unbroken forest". It occurs in two protected areas in Venezuela.
