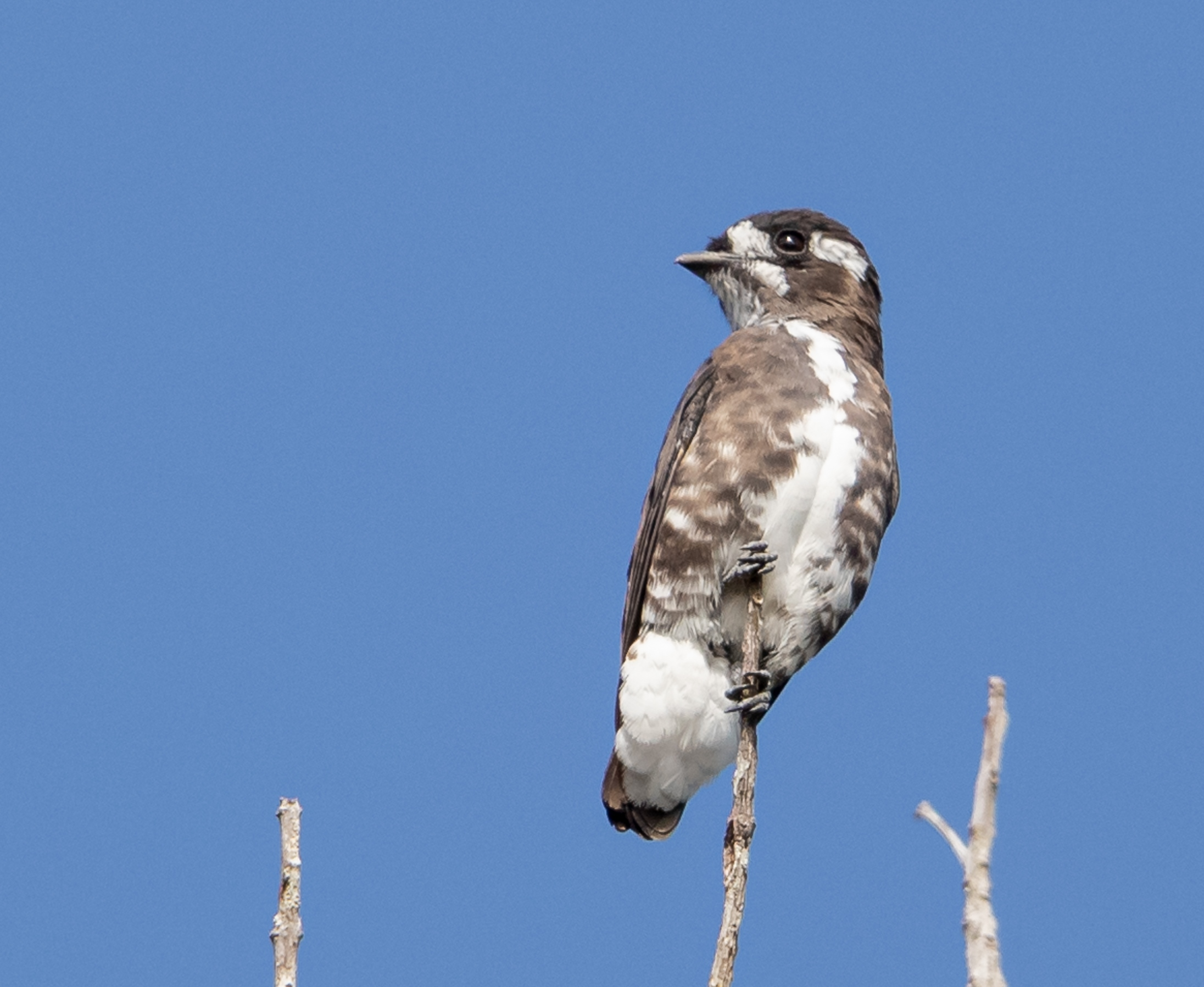
- Female at Beruri, Amazonas, Brazil

Conservation status
- Least Concern (IUCN 3.1)

Scientific classification
- Kingdom: Animalia
- Phylum: Chordata
- Class: Aves
- Order: Passeriformes
- Family: Tityridae
- Genus: Iodopleura
- Species: I. isabellae

Binomial name
- Iodopleura isabellae Parzudaki, 1847

= White-browed purpletuft =

Species of bird

The white-browed purpletuft (Iodopleura isabellae) is a small species of bird in the family Tityridae, the tityras, becards, and allies. It is found in Bolivia, Brazil, Colombia, Ecuador, Peru, and Venezuela.

== Taxonomy and systematics ==
The white-browed purpletuft was originally described in 1847 as Iodopleurus isabellae. The genus' spelling was later changed to Iodopleura. Well into the twentieth century authors placed that genus in Cotingidae. Several early twenty-first century studies confirmed the placement of Iodopleura in Tityridae and taxonomic systems made the reassignment.

The white-browed purpletuft's further taxonomy is unsettled. The IOC, BirdLife International's Handbook of the Birds of the World, and AviList treat it as monotypic. As of late 2024 the Clements taxonomy assigned it two subspecies, the nominate I. i. isabellae and I. i. paraensis.

The white-browed purpletuft shares genus Iodopleura with the buff-throated purpletuft (I. pipra) and the dusky purpletuft (I. fusca). The white-browed and dusky purpletufts form a superspecies and might be conspecific.

This article follows the monotypic species model.

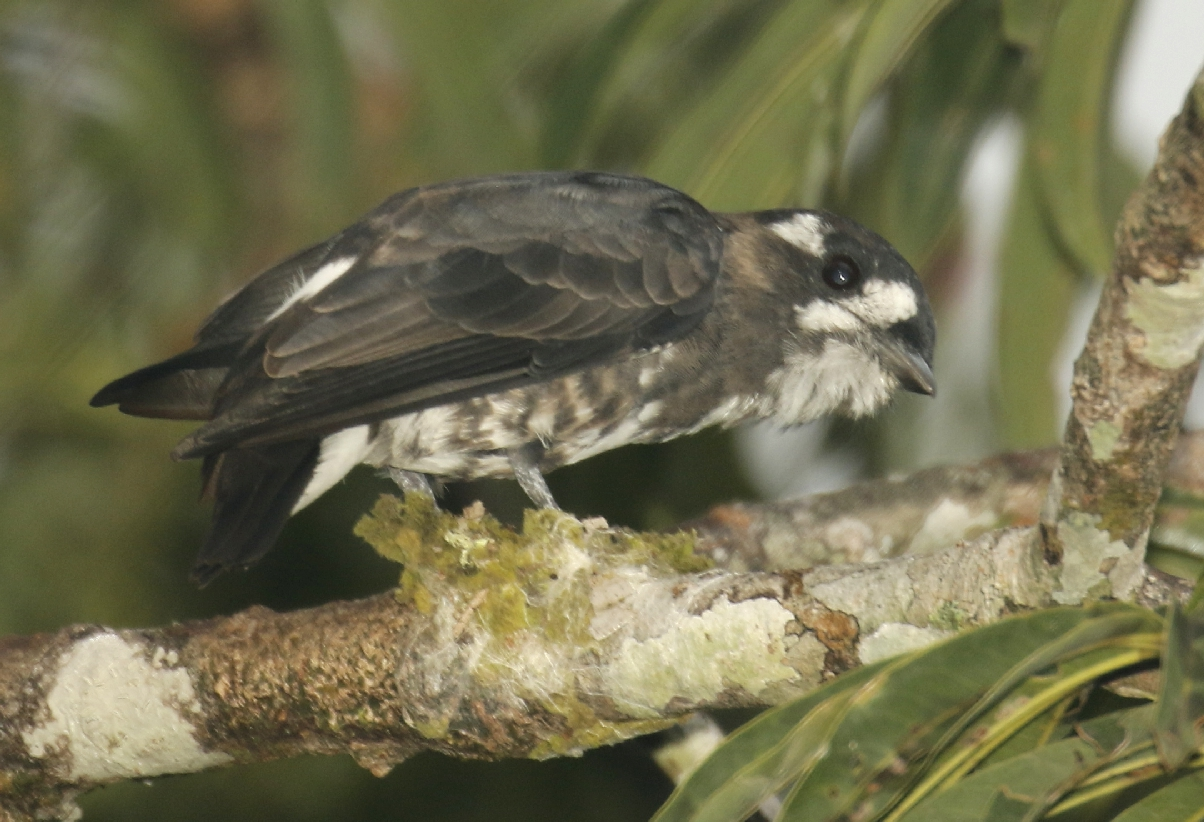
At Sani Lodge, Ecuador

== Description ==
The white-browed purpletuft is 11 to 12 cm (4.3 to 4.7 in) long and weighs about 20 g (0.71 oz). The sexes have almost the same plumage. They have long wings, a short tail, and a wide bill with a hooked tip. Adults have white lores, a white stripe behind the eye, a white "moustache", and a white throat. The rest of their head and their back, wings, and tail are blackish brown. They have a white band on the rump. Their underparts are mostly white with dusky brown sides and dusky bars on the flanks. Males have a small tuft of violet feathers on their upper flank; females' tufts are white. Both sexes have a dark brown iris, a black maxilla, a lead-gray mandible, and dark lead-gray legs. Juveniles have white tips on their dark feathers.

== Distribution and habitat ==
The white-browed purpletuft is a bird of the Amazon Basin. It is found from the southeastern third of Colombia south through eastern Ecuador and eastern Peru and from there east into southern Venezuela's Amazonas state, across Amazonian Brazil to the Atlantic in Pará and northern Maranhão and south to northern Goiás, and into far northern Bolivia. It inhabits the canopy and edges of humid evergreen forest and secondary woodland. In elevation it reaches 500 m (1,600 ft) in Colombia and Ecuador, 850 m (2,800 ft) in Peru, and 200 m (700 ft) and "probably higher" in Venezuela.

== Behavior ==
=== Movement ===
The white-browed purpletuft is believed to be a year-round resident.

=== Feeding ===
The white-browed purpletuft feeds primarily on insects and also includes much fruit in its diet. Berries of mistletoe (Loranthaceae) are apparently favored. It usually forages in pairs and sometimes in small groups. It takes insects in mid-air with a sally from a treetop and fruit while perched or during a brief hover after a sally.

=== Breeding ===
The white-browed purpletuft's breeding season has not been defined but spans at least September to December in eastern Brazil. The one described nest was a tiny cup made from plant fibers held together and attached to a horizontal branch with much spider web. It was about 18 m (60 ft) above the ground in the crown of a dead tree.

=== Vocalization ===
The white-browed purpletuft's song is an "extr. high, upslurred seewee or single see". It also makes "soft sr’r’r trills in series, weak jee-jee-jee and thin ti-ti-ti-ti-ti-ti-ti rattle" calls.

== Status ==
The IUCN has assessed the white-browed purpletuft as being of Least Concern. It has a very large range; its population size is not known and is believed to be decreasing. No immediate threats have been identified. It is considered fairly common in Colombia, "scarce" in Ecuador, uncommon in Peru and Venezuela, and "frequent to uncommon" in Brazil. It is "probably under-recorded owing to difficulty of observation of small treetop birds in areas of unbroken forest" and occurs in several protected areas.
