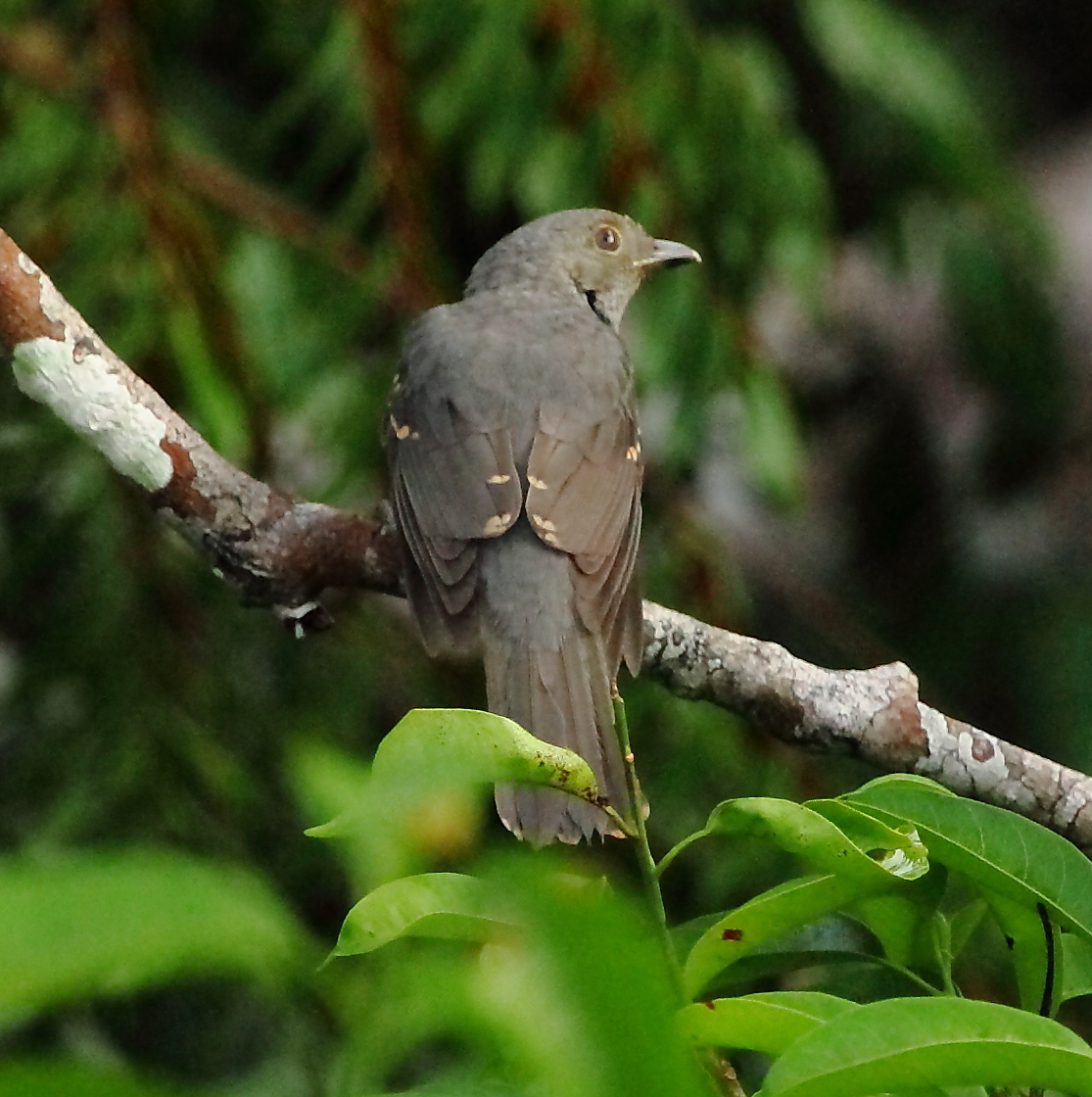
- Cinereous mourner (Laniocera hypopyrra)

Scientific classification
- Kingdom: Animalia
- Phylum: Chordata
- Class: Aves
- Order: Passeriformes
- Family: Tityridae
- Subfamily: Tityrinae
- Genus: Laniocera; Lesson, 1841

Type species
- Laniocera sanguinaria Lesson, 1841

= Laniocera =

Mourners

Genus of birds

Laniocera is a genus of passerine birds in the family Tityridae. It has traditionally been placed in the cotinga family, but evidence strongly suggest it is better placed in Tityridae, where now placed by SACC. They share the common name "mourner" with the species in the genera Schiffornis, Laniisoma and Rhytipterna.

== Species ==
Image	Scientific name	Common name	Distribution
	Laniocera rufescens	Speckled mourner	Belize, Colombia, Costa Rica, Ecuador, Guatemala, Honduras, Mexico, Nicaragua, and Panama.
	Laniocera hypopyrra	Cinereous mourner	Bolivia, Brazil, Colombia, Ecuador, French Guiana, Guyana, Peru, Suriname, and Venezuela.
