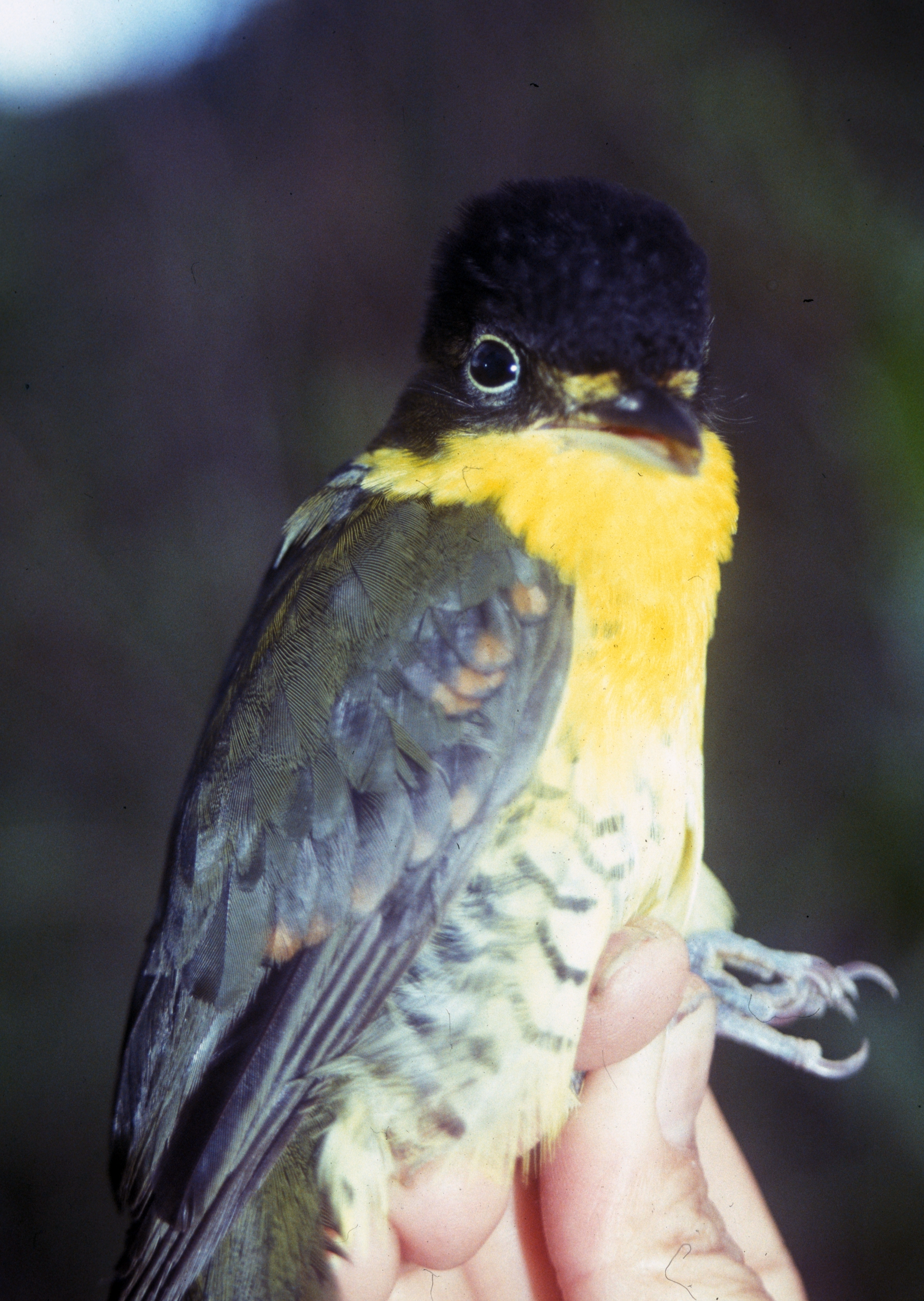
- Male

Conservation status
- Least Concern (IUCN 3.1)

Scientific classification
- Kingdom: Animalia
- Phylum: Chordata
- Class: Aves
- Order: Passeriformes
- Family: Tityridae
- Genus: Laniisoma
- Species: L. buckleyi

Binomial name
- Laniisoma buckleyi (Sclater, PL & Salvin, 1880)

= Andean laniisoma =

Species of bird

The Andean laniisoma (Laniisoma buckleyi) is a species of passerine bird in the family Tityridae, the tityras, becards, and allies. It is found Bolivia, Colombia, Ecuador, Peru, and Venezuela.

== Taxonomy and systematics ==
The Andean laniisoma was originally described in 1880 as Ptilochloris buckleyi in the family Cotingidae. It was later reassigned to genus Laniisoma that William Swainson had erected in 1832. Well into the twentieth century authors kept Laniisoma in Cotingidae. Several early twenty-first century studies confirmed its placement in Tityridae and taxonomic systems made the reassignment.

The Andean laniisoma's further taxonomy is unsettled. It was long treated as a subspecies of L. elegans, which had the English name "shrike-like cotinga" and now is called by most the Brazilian laniisoma. In the 2010s taxonomists began separating L. buckleyi from L. elegans, leaving the latter as a monotypic species. The IOC, the Clements taxonomy, and AviList have all recognized the split. They assign the Andean laniisoma these three subspecies:

- L. b. venezuelense Phelps, WH & Gilliard, 1941
- L. b. buckleyi (Sclater, PL & Salvin, 1880)
- L. b. cadwaladeri Carriker, 1935

BirdLife International's Handbook of the Birds of the World (HBW) also recognizes the split, but treats L. buckleyi as monotypic. The South American Classification Committee has not recognized the split and retains the name "shrike-like cotinga" for L. elegans sensu lato. However, the committee recognizes that L. elegans is probably not monotypic and is seeking a proposal to revise its treatment. It further recognizes that the name "cotinga" is no longer appropriate but rejected a proposal to change it.

This article follows the IOC et al. treatment with three subspecies.

== Description ==
The Andean laniisoma is about 17 to 18 cm (6.7 to 7.1 in) long and weighs about 40 to 60 g (1.4 to 2.1 oz). The sexes have similar plumage. They have a long bill with a hooked tip. Adult males of the nominate subspecies L. b. buckleyi have a black cap and a pale greenish yellow eye-ring on an otherwise olive-green face. Their upperparts, wings, and tail are olive-green. Their underparts are mostly yellow with a few black spots on the throat and black bars along the sides and flanks. Adult females have a lighter dusky olive-green cap than males and their undersides are almost completely covered with black bars. Males of subspecies L. b. cadwaladeri are much like the nominate but with less barring on their undersides. Males of L. b. venezuelense have even less barring than cadwaladeri. Both sexes of all subspecies have a dark red to blackish iris, a blackish or dark steel gray maxilla, a greenish, pale horn, or gray-green mandible, and olive-green to plumbeous legs.

== Distribution and habitat ==
The Andean laniisoma is found intermittently along the eastern side of the Andes from Venezuela to Bolivia. Subspecies L. b. venezuelense is the northernmost. It is found from Barinas and Táchira states in northwestern Venezuela south into northeastern Colombia. The nominate subspecies is found from central Colombia south through eastern Ecuador to central Peru. L. b. cadwaladeri is found in northwestern Bolivia.

The Andean laniisoma inhabits humid primary forest and mature secondary forest where it favors small ravines and streams and areas heavy with moss and vines. In elevation it is found between 200 and 530 m (700 and 1,700 ft) in Venezuela, between 500 and 1,000 m (1,600 and 3,300 ft) in Colombia, between 400 and 1,350 m (1,300 and 4,400 ft) in Ecuador, and between 750 and 1,800 m (2,500 and 5,900 ft) in Peru.

== Behavior ==
=== Movement ===
The Andean laniisoma appears to be a year-round resident but there is some evidence from Ecuador of seasonal elevational movements.

=== Feeding ===
The Andean laniisoma's diet and feeding behavior appear to be similar to those of the Brazilian laniisoma. That species feeds on adult and larval insects and on fruit. Few details are known but its diet includes Lepidoptera caterpillars and Melastomataceae berries. It typically remains perched for long periods and grabs food from vegetation and branches with short flights. It occasionally joins mixed-species feeding flocks.

=== Breeding ===
The Andean laniisoma's breeding season appears to include August in Ecuador and Peru but nothing certain is known about the species' breeding biology.

=== Vocalization ===
The Andean laniisoma's song has been described as "a very high-pitched and sibilant SEEeeweeEEE, SEEeeweeEEE, SEEeeweeEEE". It also "gives a squeaky rattle and descending ki-ki-ki calls".

== Status ==
The IUCN originally in 2016 assessed the Andean laniisoma as Near Threatened and since 2023 as being of Least Concern. It has a large overall range of about 1,810,000 km^{2} (700,000 sq mi) but its area of occupancy within it is not known. Its population size is not known and is believed to be decreasing. "Widespread destruction of forest is being caused by peasant farmers and tea and coffee growers all along the east slope of the Andes...Thee rate of deforestation however varies considerably across the range, and much of the species' habitat in parts of the range remains relatively intact, especially in higher elevations." It is known in Venezuela only from six specimens. It is considered uncommon in Colombia and rare and local in Ecuador and Peru. There are only two records in Bolivia. "Lack of basic information on distribution and ecology hampers reassessment of its global conservation status [and it] may be more continuously distributed than is currently known".
