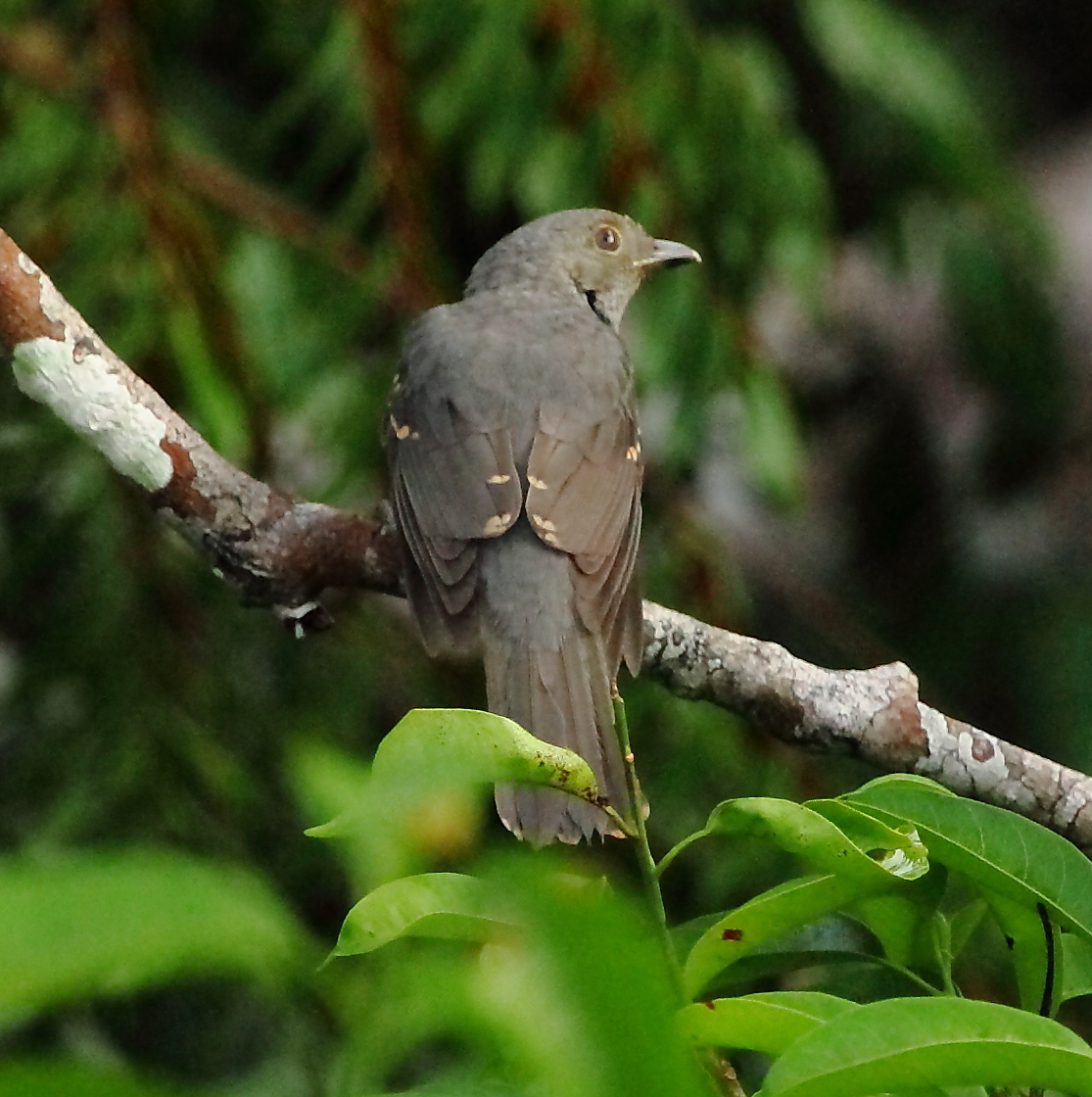
- At Manaus, Amazonas state, Brazil

Conservation status
- Least Concern (IUCN 3.1)

Scientific classification
- Kingdom: Animalia
- Phylum: Chordata
- Class: Aves
- Order: Passeriformes
- Family: Tityridae
- Genus: Laniocera
- Species: L. hypopyrra

Binomial name
- Laniocera hypopyrra (Vieillot, 1817)

= Cinereous mourner =

Species of bird

The cinereous mourner (Laniocera hypopyrra) is a species of bird in the family Tityridae, the tityras, becards, and allies. It is found in every mainland South American country except Argentina, Chile, Paraguay, and Uruguay.

== Taxonomy and systematics ==
The cinereous mourner was originally described in 1817 as Ampelis hypopyrra. It was later reassigned to genus Laniocera that Lesson had erected in 1841. Well into the twentieth century authors variously placed that genus in Cotingidae, the manakin family Pipridae, or the tyrant flycatcher family Tyrannidae. Several early twenty-first century studies confirmed the placement of Laniocera in Tityridae and taxonomic systems made the reassignment. The species' English name "cinereous" means "ash-colored".

The cinereous mourner shares genus Laniocera with the speckled mourner (L. rufescens) and the two form a superspecies. The cinereous mourner is monotypic.

== Description ==
The cinereous mourner is 20 to 21 cm (7.9 to 8.3 in) long and weighs 41 to 51 g (1.4 to 1.8 oz). The sexes have the same plumage. Adults have a thin orange ring around the eye. The rest of their head, upperparts, wings, and tail are mostly gray. Their primaries have a brown tinge and two rows of cinnamon spots that show as broken wing bars. Their tertials and the tips of their tail feathers have smaller cinnamon spots. Their underparts are a slightly paler gray than their upperparts. Their breast and crissum sometimes have black-tipped orange spots. They have pectoral tufts that are often hidden; in one variant the tufts are orange and in a second one they are pale yellow. Both variants have a dark iris, a dark bill, and gray legs.

Nestlings of this species are orange with long filoplumes that end in white tips and have a resemblance to hairy caterpillars of a moth belonging to the family Megalopygidae. The young birds move their heads slowly from side to side which are thought to enhance the impression by resembling a moving caterpillar. It is thought that this may be the first case of Batesian mimicry involving a harmless bird mimic and a toxic insect model, although another species, the Brazilian laniisoma (Laniisoma elegans), also has young that share a similar downy appearance; however, detailed observations of the latter are unavailable.

== Distribution and habitat ==
The cinereous mourner is found throughout the entire Orinoco River and Amazon River basins with a disjunct population in eastern Brazil. Its main range spans from southeastern Colombia south through eastern Ecuador and eastern Peru into northwestern Bolivia. From there it extends east across southern and eastern Venezuela and the Guianas and all of Amazonian Brazil. The isolated population is found in southeastern Bahia and northern Espírito Santo.

The cinereous mourner primarily inhabits humid terra firme and igapó forest. It seems to favor sloping terrain and areas near ravines. In some areas it also occurs in forest on sandy soil and in woodlands in savanna. In elevation it occurs up to 600 m (2,000 ft) in Colombia, mostly up to 400 m (1,300 ft) in Ecuador, up to 900 m (3,000 ft) in Peru, and up to 500 m (1,600 ft) in Venezuela.

== Behavior ==
=== Movement ===
The cinereous mourner is believed to be a sedentary year-round resident.

=== Feeding ===
The cinereous mourner feeds on arthropods and fruit. It forages from the forest's understory to its midstory, usually singly, and sometimes joins mixed-species feeding flocks. It perches silently and makes short sallies, sometimes with a brief hover, to glean from foliage or branches.

=== Breeding ===
The cinereous mourner's breeding season has not been determined but spans at least September to November in Peru and Bolivia. One described nest was a cup made from dry leaves nestled within an epiphitic fern on a tree trunk about 1.8 m (6 ft) above the ground. It contained two eggs that appeared to be incubated by a single bird. The incubation period, time to fledging, and details of parental care are not known.

=== Vocalization ===
The cinereous mourner's song is "a series of 10–15 very high-pitched, thin, drowsy and slurred tee-o-weeét whistles, first whistle often longer cheeeeee-a-wee". It is ventrioquial, insect-like, and carries a great distance. The bird makes long pauses between song bouts. It also makes a "series of 3–4 plaintive teeéuw whistles and a repeated weet-jeh shriek".

== Status ==
The IUCN has assessed the cinereous mourner as being of Least Concern. It has an extremely large range; its population size is not known and is believed to be decreasing. No immediate threats have been identified. It is considered uncommon in Colombia and Peru, "scarce" in Ecuador, "uncommon and local" in Venezuela, and "frequent to uncommon" in Brazil. It occurs in many protected areas both public and private, and "[m]uch of its habitat is in relatively pristine condition within its large range". However, the status of the small separate population in eastern Brazil is uncertain.
