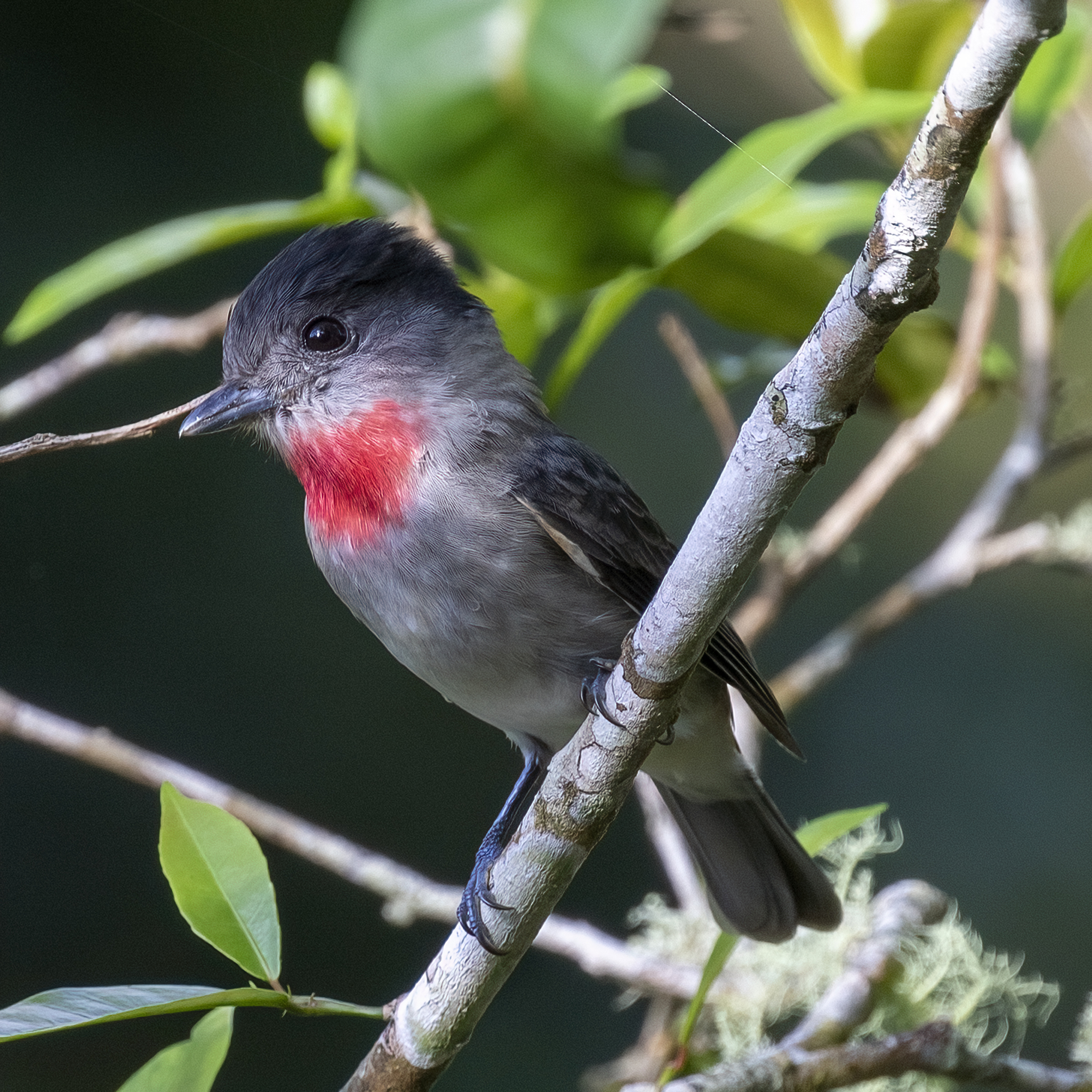
- Adult male in Oaxaca, Mexico
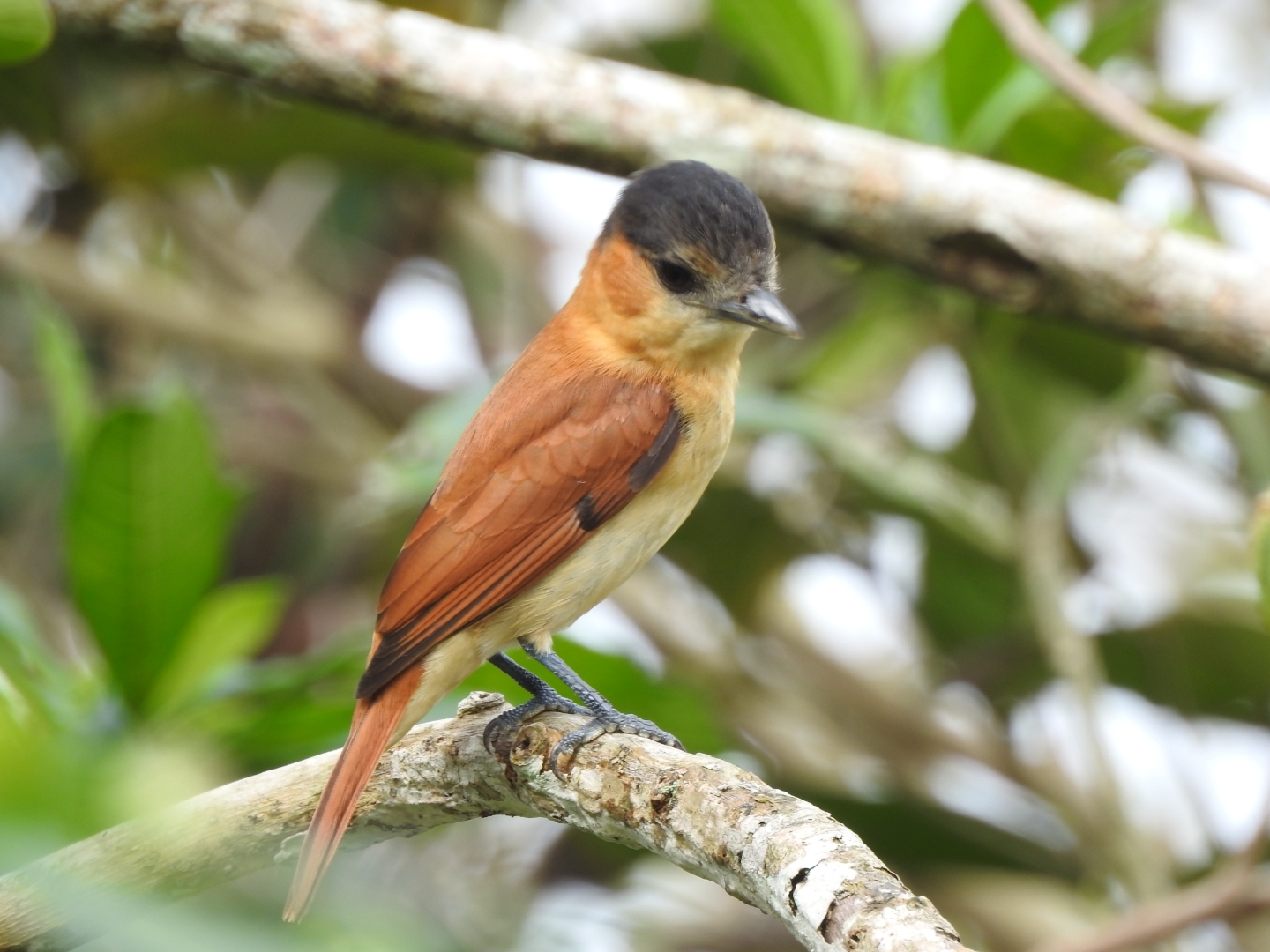
- Female in Tlacotalpan, Mexico

Conservation status
- Least Concern (IUCN 3.1)

Scientific classification
- Kingdom: Animalia
- Phylum: Chordata
- Class: Aves
- Order: Passeriformes
- Family: Tityridae
- Genus: Pachyramphus
- Species: P. aglaiae

Binomial name
- Pachyramphus aglaiae (Lafresnaye, 1839)

Subspecies
- 8, see text
- Range of P. aglaiae Summer visitor Resident

Synonyms
- List: Pachyrhynchus aglaiae Lafresnaye, 1839 (protonym); Platypsaris aglaiae Lafresnaye, 1839; Pachyramphus latirostris Bonaparte, 1854; Hadrostomus albiventris Lawrence, 1867; Platypsaris insularis Ridgway, 1887

= Rose-throated becard =

Species of bird

The rose-throated becard (Pachyramphus aglaiae) is a medium-sized passerine bird in the family Tityridae. It breeds from southeasternmost Arizona and extreme southern Texas in the United States and across Central America to western Panama. Males are mostly gray with a dark crest and have a characteristic rose-colored neck bib, which is absent in certain rainforest populations. Females also have a dark crest but are otherwise browner, with rusty-brown upperparts and pale buffy underparts.

The rose-throated becard is an omnivore, consuming fruit, berries, seeds, and (primarily) insects, either on the wing or by gleaning. Its typical habitat is riparian woodland and other semi-arid or subtropical open habitats with scattered trees. Breeding typically begins in May, with three to six eggs being laid in a domed nest suspended from a high tree branch.

== Taxonomy ==
The rose-throated becard was formally described by French ornithologist and baron Frédéric de Lafresnaye in 1839 under the binomial name Pachyrhynchus aglaiae. This binomial is now considered invalid due to the name Pachyrhynchus already being used for a genus of beetles. The rose-throated becard is now placed in the genus Pachyramphus that was introduced in 1839 by the English zoologist George Robert Gray in the volume on birds by John Gould that formed part of Charles Darwin's Zoology of the Voyage of H.M.S. Beagle. The generic name Pachyramphus is from the Ancient Greek pakhus meaning "stout" or "thick" and rhamphos meaning "bill". The specific epithet aglaiae honors Aglaé Brelay, the wife of French wholesale hair merchant, naturalist, and collector Charles Brelay (1792–1857).

The classification of the becards was long controversial, with taxonomists arguing either that they were cotingas or tyrant flycatchers. Genetic evidence has shown that they belong in a separate family altogether. Since 2011, the becards have been placed in Tityridae, along with several other groups of birds which appear very different from one another but are nonetheless closely related.

Eight subspecies of rose-throated becard are recognized:

- P. a. aglaiae (Lafresnaye, 1839)
- P. a. albiventris (Lawrence, 1867) - Synonyms: Hadrostomus albiventris (Lawrence, 1867), Platypsaris aglaiae richmondi (Van Rossem, 1930)
- P. a. gravis (Van Rossem, 1938)
- P. a. hypophaeus (Ridgway, 1891)
- P. a. insularis (Ridgway, 1887) - Synonym: Platypsaris insularis (Ridgway, 1887)
- P. a. latirostris (Bonaparte, 1854) - Synonym: Pachyramphus latirostris (Bonaparte, 1854)
- P. a. sumichrasti (Nelson, 1897)
- P. a. yucatanensis (Ridgway, 1906)

== Distribution and habitat ==
The rose-throated becard is a widespread year-round resident in tropical and subtropical regions across Central America from Mexico to western Panama. It is the only member of its family to occur regularly in the United States. Its breeding range extends into southeasternmost Arizona and extreme southern Texas, but these areas are generally abandoned for the winter. Becards were first discovered nesting in Arizona in the Santa Cruz River in the late 1940s and have since become established. After a period of sporadic breeding in places such as Arivaca Creek and near Sonoita Creek, they are successfully breeding again in the Santa Cruz River. Breeding in southern Texas has been particularly sporadic, with nesting occurring in small numbers in the Lower Rio Grande Valley from the 1940s to the 1990s. Breeding in southern Texas may become more regular in the future, as there has been a recent increase in becard observations in that region in the 2020s. Four active nests were discovered in Starr County, Texas, in March 2024, all in riparian forest.

Rose-throated becards occur in riparian woodland, forest edges, and generally most habitats that are scattered with larger trees. The northernmost populations favor riparian woodlands dominated by cottonwoods. Birds in the rest of the range can be found in a wider variety of forest habitats as well as scrubland in wet and semi-arid climates, where they can forage in open or semi-open areas. Fruit-bearing trees tend to attract the bird. Other habitat types include hedgerows, moist subtropical forests, and wetlands.

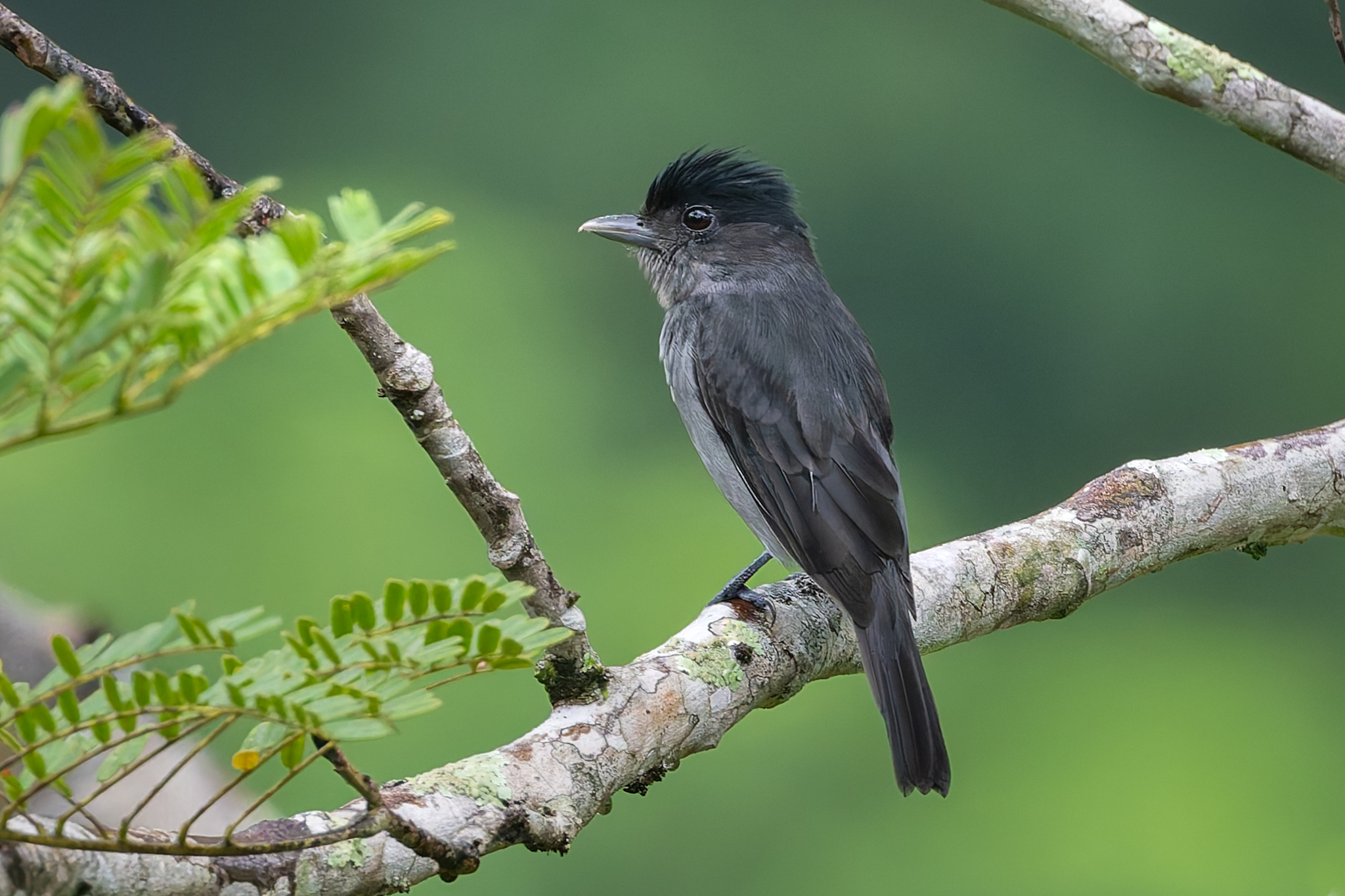
In Cayo District, Belize. The extent of the namesake pink throat patch varies across subspecies, with some in rainforests having none at all

== Description ==
Rose-throated becards appear large-headed and show a dark gray to black crown or crest. Males tend to be pale gray in drier areas and significantly darker in rainforests, though always remaining countershaded gray. The diagnostic rose-colored throat patch is variable and not present across all populations, with the darkest males in rainforests having none at all. Males also have a hidden white shoulder patch which can be used during courtship, as well as a truncated ninth primary feather, the function of which is unknown. Females are mostly brown in color, with rusty brown upperparts and pale buffy underparts. Younger males are similar to the females but show a variable pink patch on the throat depending on the subspecies.

The song of the rose-throated becard is described as short, sliding, and two-noted. One of its calls is a unique piercing cry.

== Behaviour ==
=== Breeding and nesting ===
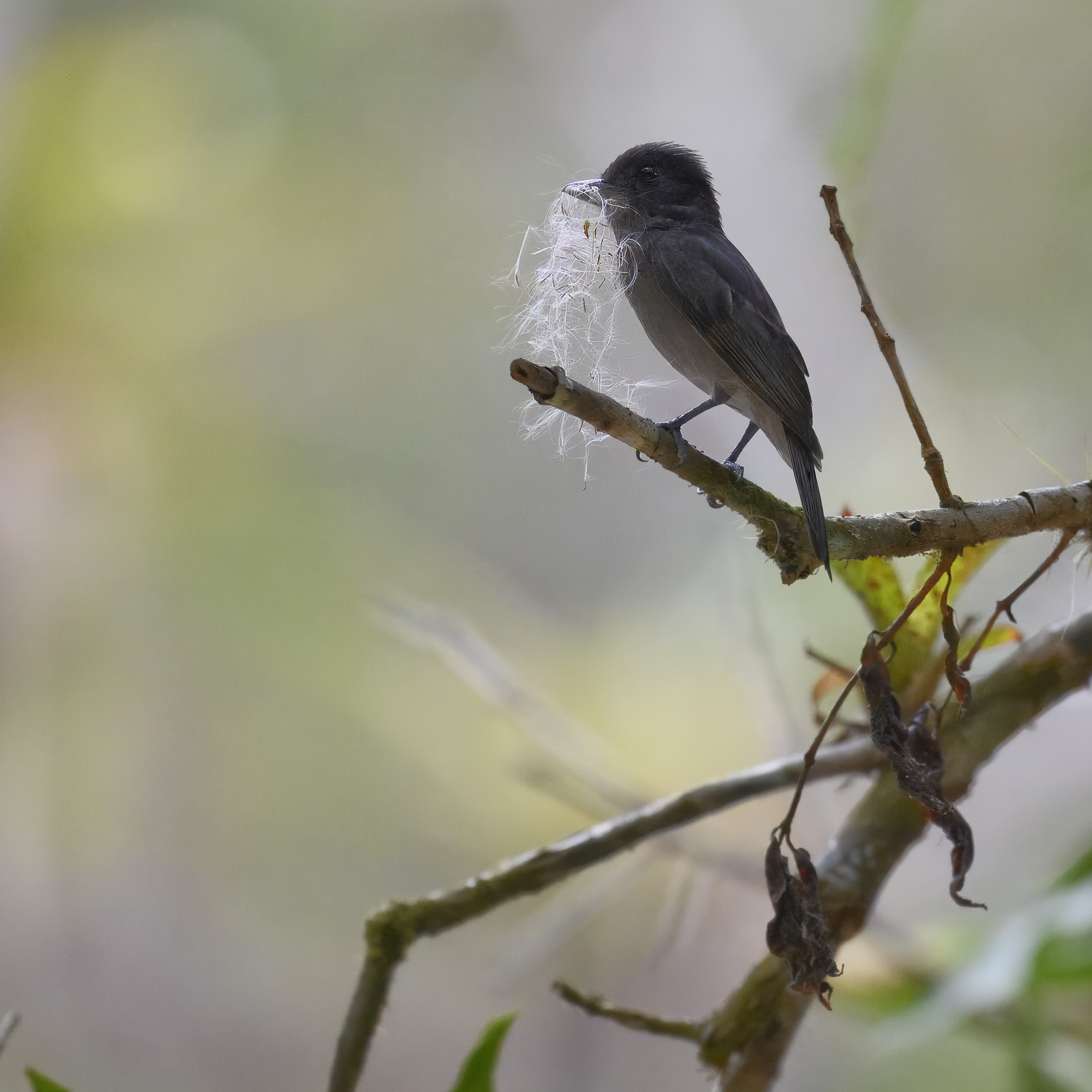
Male with nest material

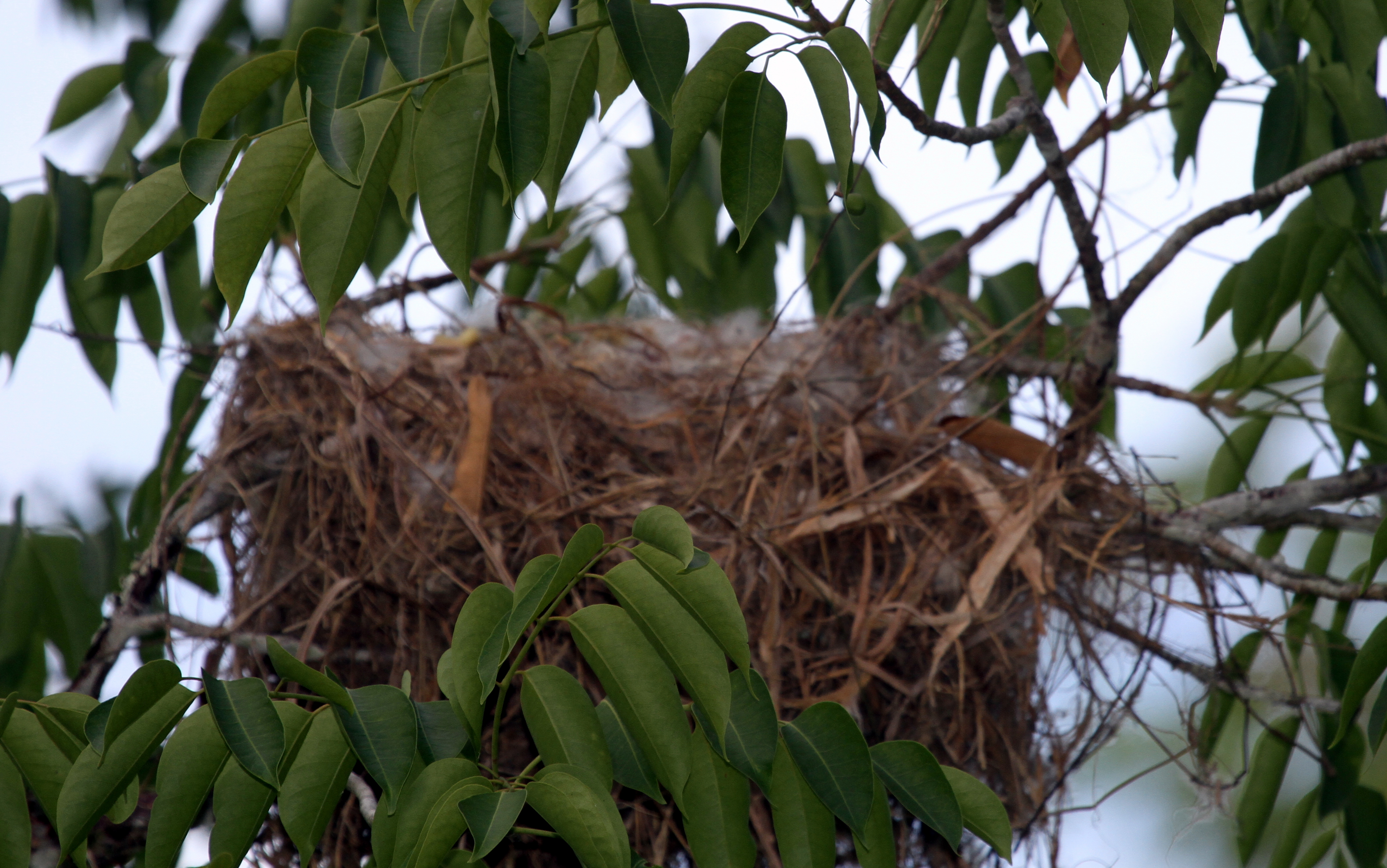
Rose-throated becard nest

Rose-throated becards are monogamous. Both parents participate in building the nest and feeding the young, but only the females incubate. Most breeding activity runs from May to July, but the breeding season may occur later at higher elevations. In Starr County, Texas, in 2024, nest building began as early as March or possibly even February. This was the earliest known nesting occurrence that year in the United States. Further east, in Hidalgo County, nesting ran from May through July. Becards in Arizona have been observed building nests in April and May. This type of flexibility in nesting timing may be advantageous, allowing the species to avoid raising chicks during the warmest months of the year.

Rose-throated becards make large, domed nests that are globular or piriform (pear-shaped) and suspended from the low-hanging ends of slender branches several meters above the ground. The nests, which have an entrance near the bottom, are made of dead leaves, dry grass, pieces of bark, and stems. Other materials may also be used in the building of the nest, such as hemp rope. In Starr County, all four nests were found in Mexican ash (Fraxinus berlandieriana), and at the end of a branch above an open area 6 to 12 meters high. In Hidalgo County, a female had built her nest on the branch of a dead tepehuaje (Leucaena pulverulenta), which later fell.

Three to six eggs are laid, with great variation in color including off-white, light purple, olive, and pinkish. Eggs have scrawling, spotted markings at the larger end. Rose-throated becards are mostly solitary, usually occurring alone or in pairs. They sometimes form loose nesting associations with other bird species, particularly tyrant flycatchers and New World orioles. A becard in Oaxaca nested in the same tree as a tropical kingbird, vermilion flycatcher, and three other species. Occasionally, the becards would steal nest material from the other nests when unattended. Both parents are vocal around the nest, particularly the males, which are territorial, perching vigilantly and chasing off potential intruders. Resident rose-throated becards in western Mexico show molt-breeding overlap; they will molt their primary flight feathers during the breeding season.

=== Feeding ===
Rose-throated becards feed primarily on insects, which they will glean from the vegetation, but hawking is also employed. Fruit, berries, and seeds will be taken as well. While feeding, becards tend to move their heads back and forth in a slow and deliberate manner.

== Status ==
The global population of rose-throated becards was estimated at 2 million mature individuals in 2019. Within its extensive range, tree cover has been declining at a rate of up to 12% over ten years. The species is declining, but not at a sufficient rate to warrant uplisting to a Vulnerable species. Due to its large range and population size, it is listed as a species of least-concern on the IUCN Red List.
