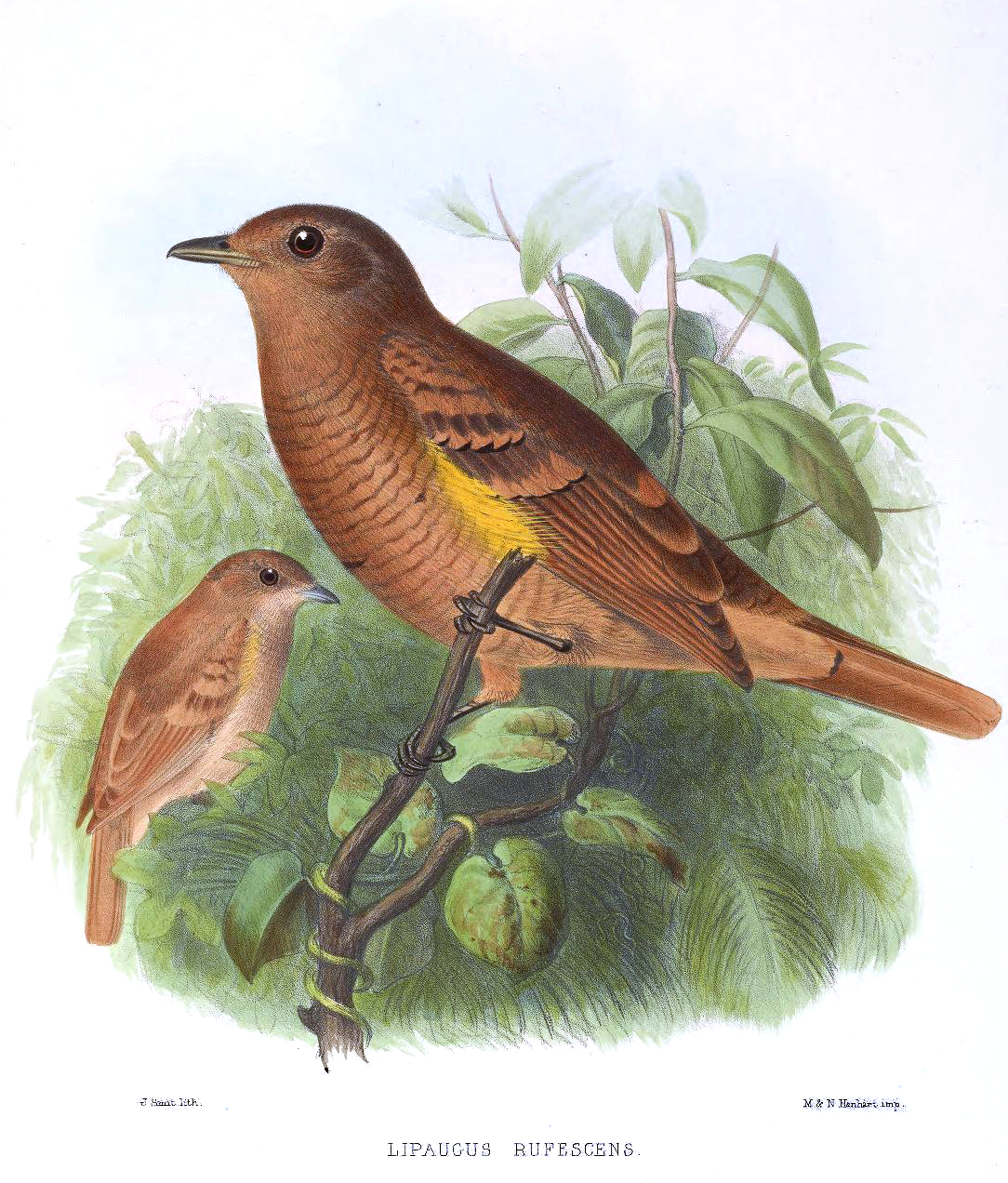

Conservation status
- Least Concern (IUCN 3.1)

Scientific classification
- Kingdom: Animalia
- Phylum: Chordata
- Class: Aves
- Order: Passeriformes
- Family: Tityridae
- Genus: Laniocera
- Species: L. rufescens

Binomial name
- Laniocera rufescens (Sclater, PL, 1858)

= Speckled mourner =

Species of bird

The speckled mourner (Laniocera rufescens) is a species of bird in the family Tityridae. It is found in Mexico, in every Central American country except El Salvador, and in Colombia and Ecuador.

== Taxonomy and systematics ==
The speckled mourner was originally described in 1858 as Lipaugus rufescens, placing it in the family Cotingidae. It was later reassigned to genus Laniocera that Lesson had erected in 1841. Well into the twentieth century authors variously placed that genus in Cotingidae, the manakin family Pipridae, or the tyrant flycatcher family Tyrannidae. Several early twenty-first century studies confirmed the placement of Laniocera in Tityridae and taxonomic systems made the reassignment. In 1998 the American Ornithological Society was unsure where to place the genus and listed its members as incertae sedis but in 2011 moved them to Tityridae.

The speckled mourner shares genus Laniocera with the cinereous mourner (L. hypopyrra) and the two form a superspecies. It has three subspecies, the nominate L. r. rufescens (Sclater, PL, 1858), L. r. tertia (Hartert, EJO, 1902), and L. r. griseigula (Meyer de Schauensee, 1950).

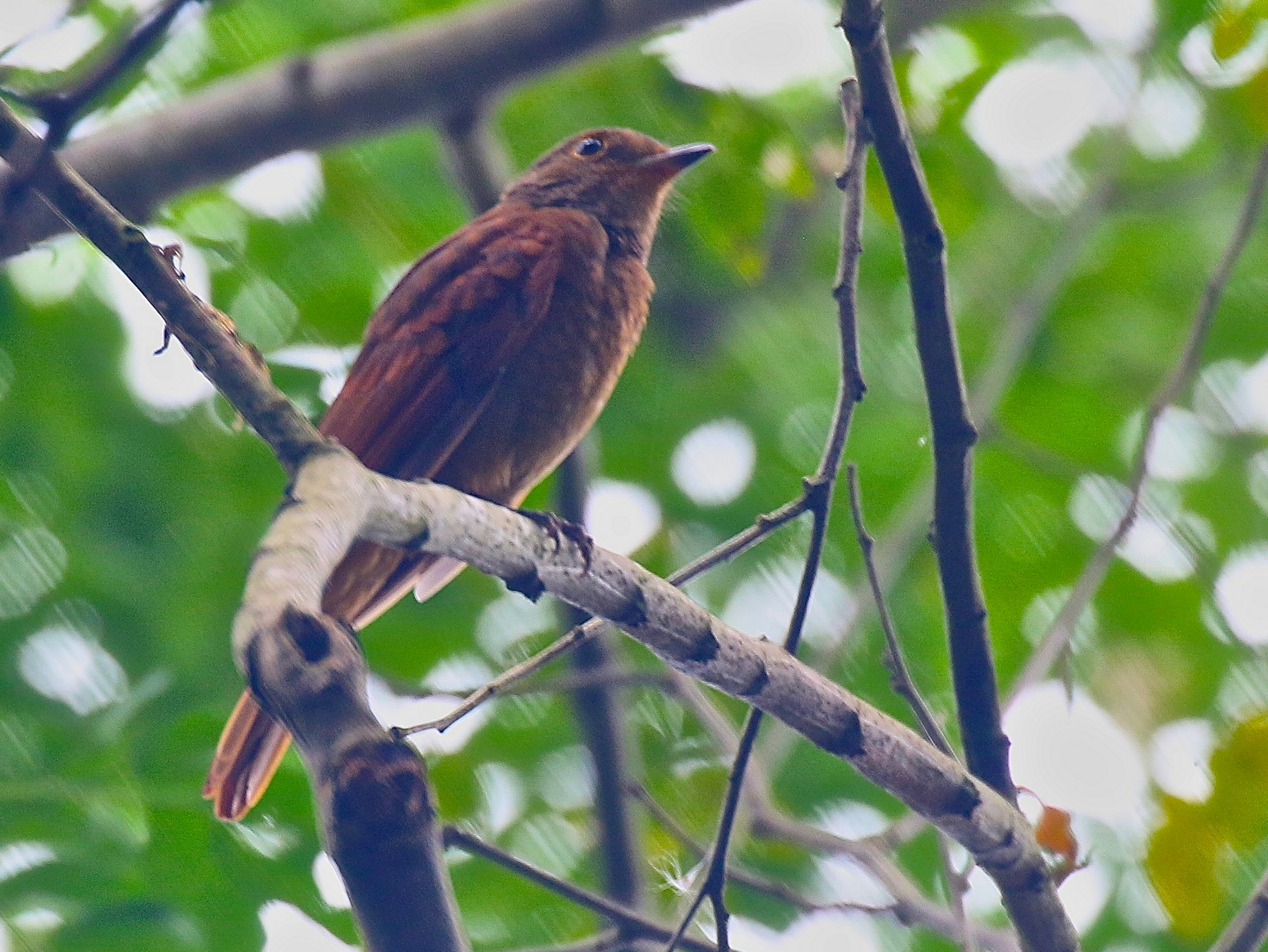
San Francisco Reserve - Darien, Panama

== Description ==
The speckled mourner is 19 to 21.5 cm (7.5 to 8.5 in) long and weighs 38.6 to 56 g (1.4 to 2.0 oz). The sexes have almost the same plumage. Adults of the nominate subspecies have a thin orange ring around the eye. The rest of their head, upperparts, wings, and tail are mostly rufous-brown. Their wing coverts are dusky with large rufous spots on the tips that form two or three faint wing bars. Their throat and underparts are mostly a paler cinnamon-brown than their upperparts. Their breast usually has thin dusky scallops. Males have pale yellow to orange pectoral tufts that are usually hidden; females usually lack them. Subspecies L. r. tertia is darker and more chestnut than the nominate, especially on its upperparts. L. r. griseigula is darker and somewhat more cinnamon than the nominate and has a gray center to its throat and upper breast. All subspecies have a brown to dark brown iris, a blackish bill with a grayish pink base to the mandible, and brownish gray legs.

The speckled mourner can be confused with the rufous piha (Lipaugus unirufus), with whom it shares almost its entire range. That species has a heavier bill, a plain breast without pectoral tufts, and no wing bars.

== Distribution and habitat ==
The nominate subspecies of the speckled mourner is the most northerly of the three and has by far the largest range. It is found from northern Oaxaca and northern Chiapas in southeastern Mexico south along the Caribbean slope through Belize, Guatemala, Honduras, Nicaragua, Costa Rica, and Panama into northwestern Colombia. It also occurs on the Pacific slope of Costa Rica in central and southern Puntarenas Province and on the Pacific slope of Panama from the Canal Zone south. Subspecies L. r. griseigula is found in the northwestern Colombian departments of Chocó, Córdoba, Antioquia, and Santander. L. r. tertia is found from Cauca Department in southwestern Colombia south into northwestern Ecuador to northern Pichincha Province. There are also scattered records further south in Ecuador.

The speckled mourner inhabits humid evergreen forest in the tropical zone, where it often favors wetter areas such as near swamps and along streams. In elevation it mostly ranges from sea level to about 750 m (2,500 ft). It reaches 800 m (2,600 ft) in Costa Rica and 1,000 m (3,300 ft) in Colombia but only 500 m (1,600 ft) in Ecuador.

== Behavior ==
=== Movement ===
The speckled mourner is a year-round resident.

=== Feeding ===
The speckled mourner feeds on arthropods, small lizards, and fruit. It forages from the forest's understory to its midstory, usually singly, and sometimes joins mixed-species feeding flocks. It perches silently and makes short sallies, sometimes with a brief hover, to glean from foliage or branches.

=== Breeding ===
The speckled mourner's breeding season in Colombia includes May but nothing else is known about the species' breeding biology.

=== Vocalization ===
Male speckled mourners "tirelessly repeat a ringing and ventriloquial tleeyr, tlee-yeeí, tlee-yeeí, tlee-yeeí...". It repeats up to 15 times, pauses, and then starts again. The species also makes a "plaintive, drawn-out, slightly mewing peeeeeeeu with [an] abrupt end".

== Status ==
The IUCN has assessed the speckled mourner as being of Least Concern. It has a very large range; its estimated population of 20,000 to 50,000 mature individuals is believed to be decreasing. No immediate threats have been identified. It is considered rare in northern Central America and Costa Rica, uncommon in Colombia, and “scarce" in Ecuador. Early in the nineteenth century it was “one of the scarcest of Middle American birds, suggesting that modern-day rates of deforestation are not solely to blame for its perceived rarity”. It is found in a few protected areas.
