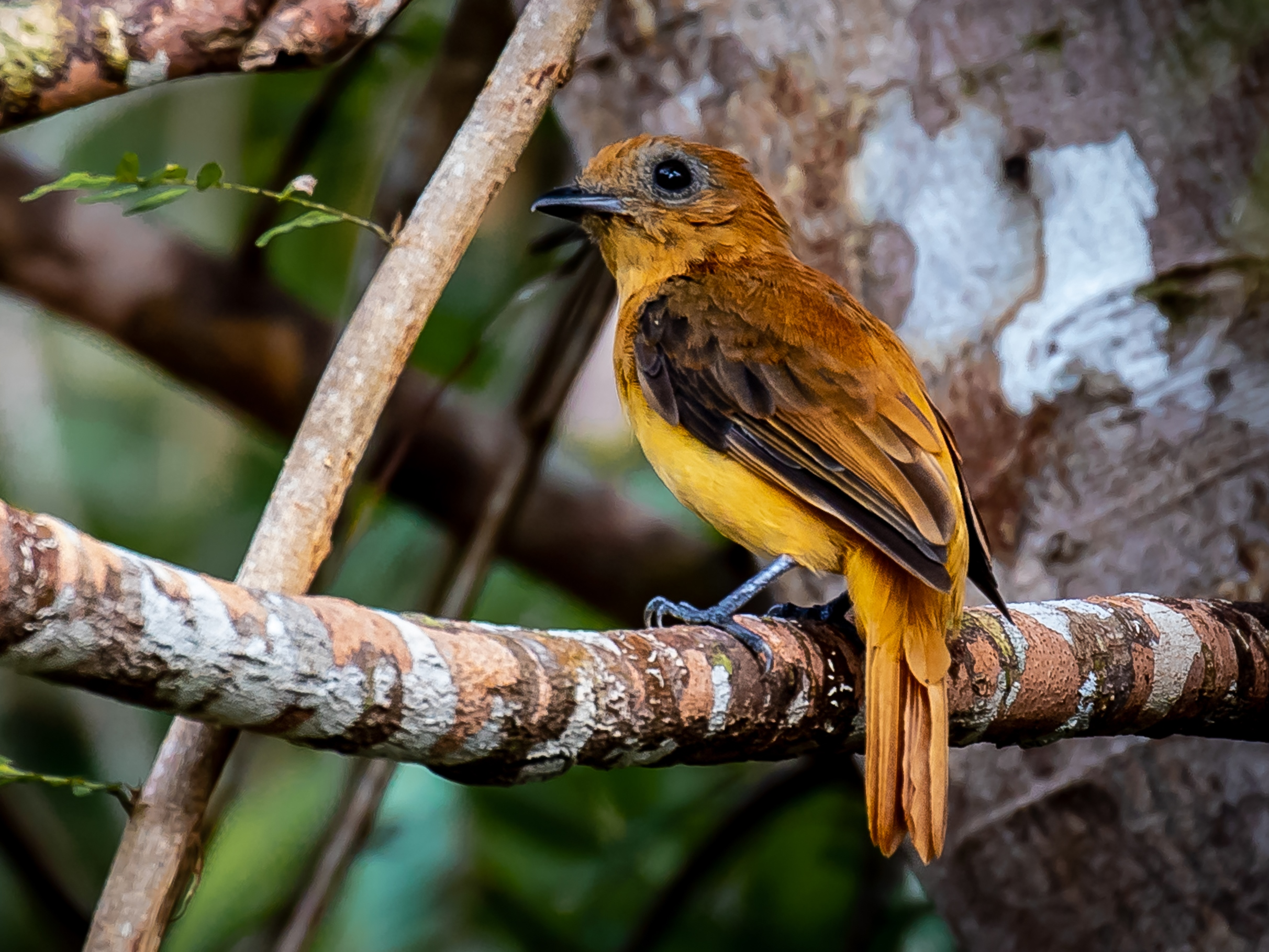
- At Anavilhanas National Park, Novo Airão, Amazonas, Brazil

Conservation status
- Least Concern (IUCN 3.1)

Scientific classification
- Kingdom: Animalia
- Phylum: Chordata
- Class: Aves
- Order: Passeriformes
- Family: Tityridae
- Genus: Schiffornis
- Species: S. major

Binomial name
- Schiffornis major Des Murs, 1856

= Varzea schiffornis =

Species of bird

The varzea schiffornis (Schiffornis major), also known as the várzea mourner or greater schiffornis, is a species of bird that belongs to Tityridae family. It has traditionally been placed in the manakin family, but evidence strongly suggest that it is better placed in Tityridae, where it is now classified by SACC.

It is found in most western regions of the Amazon Basin and Amazonian Bolivia, Brazil, Colombia, Ecuador, Peru; also regions of Venezuela. It mainly occurs in várzea.
