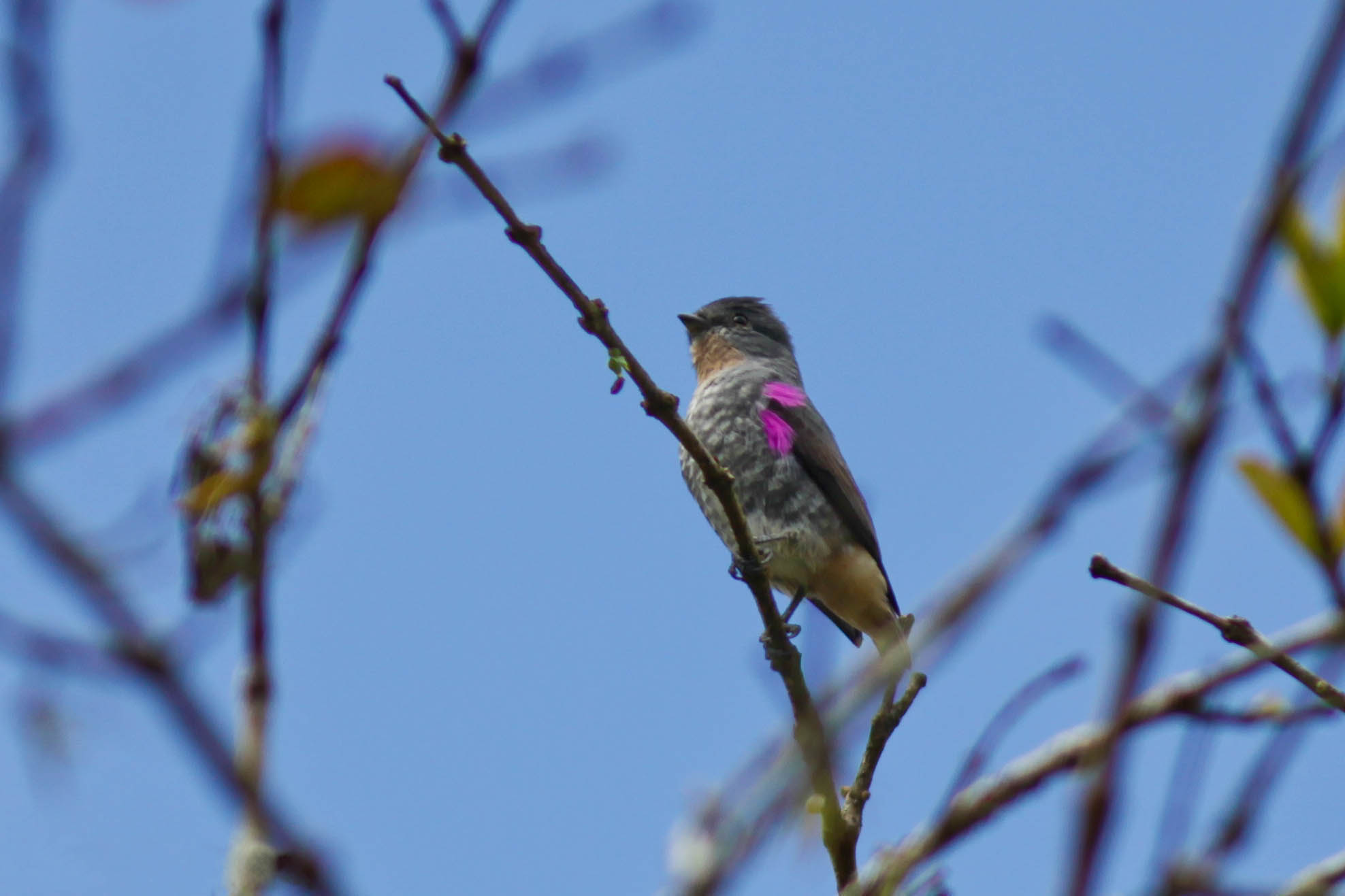
- Male buff-throated purpletuft

Scientific classification
- Kingdom: Animalia
- Phylum: Chordata
- Class: Aves
- Order: Passeriformes
- Family: Tityridae
- Subfamily: Tityrinae
- Genus: Iodopleura; Lesson, 1839

Type species
- Pardalotus pipra Lesson, 1831

= Purpletuft =

Purpletufts

Genus of birds

The purpletufts (Iodopleura) are a genus of birds in the family Tityridae. It has traditionally been placed in the cotinga family, but evidence strongly suggest it is better placed in Tityridae, where now placed by SACC. These relatively small, short-tailed birds are found in the canopy of forests in tropical South America. Their name is a reference to the purple feather tufts on the flanks of the male, but these are often not visible when the wings are held closed, and females lack them entirely.

== Species ==
Image	Scientific name	Common name	Distribution
	Iodopleura pipra	Buff-throated purpletuft	eastern Brazil.
	Iodopleura isabellae	White-browed purpletuft	Amazon Rainforest.
	Iodopleura fusca	Dusky purpletuft	southeastern Venezuela, and very locally in northeastern Brazil.
