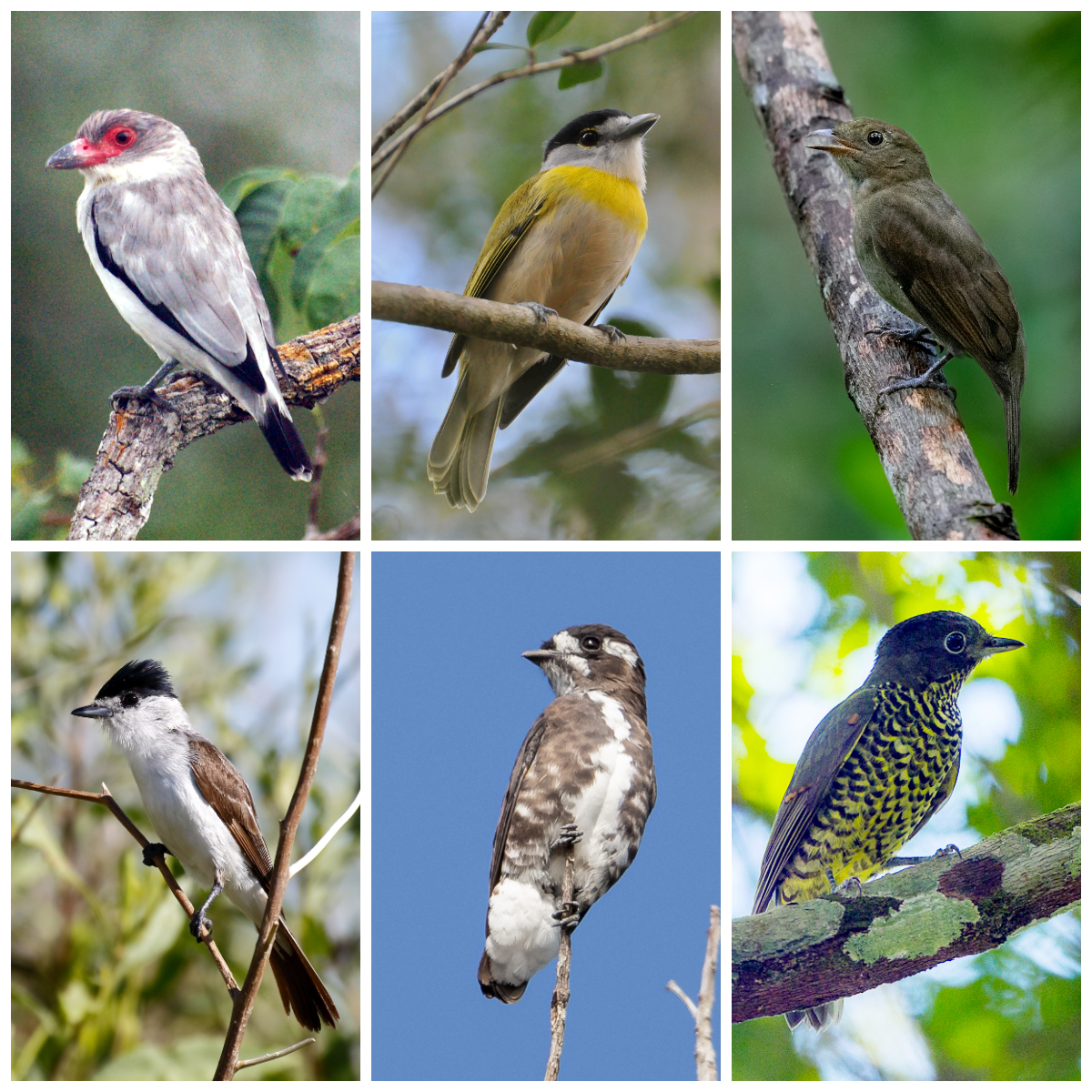
- Diversity of Tityridae

Scientific classification
- Kingdom: Animalia
- Phylum: Chordata
- Class: Aves
- Order: Passeriformes
- Parvorder: Tyrannida
- Family: Tityridae; Gray, GR, 1840

Genera
- See text

= Tityridae =

Family of birds

Tityridae is family of suboscine passerine birds found in forest and woodland in the Neotropics. The 45 species in this family were formerly spread over the families Tyrannidae, Pipridae and Cotingidae (see Taxonomy). As yet, no widely accepted common name exists for the family, although tityras and allies and tityras, mourners and allies have been used. They are small to medium-sized birds. Under current classification, the family ranges in size from the buff-throated purpletuft, at 9.5 cm (3.7 in) and 10 grams (0.35 ounces), to the masked tityra, at up to 24 cm (9.5 in) and 88 grams (3.1 ounces). Most have relatively short tails and large heads.

== Taxonomy and systematics ==
The family Tityridae (as the subfamily Tityrinae) containing the genera Tityra and Pachyramphus was introduced by the English zoologist George Robert Gray in 1840.

Traditionally, the genus Laniocera was included in the family Tyrannidae, the genera Iodopleura, Laniisoma, Tityra, Pachyramphus and Xenopsaris were included in the family Cotingidae, and Schiffornis was included in the family Pipridae. Three of these genera, Tityra, Pachyramphus and Xenopsaris, were later moved to Tyrannidae based on the morphology of their skull and syrinx.

The existence of the family Tityridae (although simply treated as a clade) was first proposed in 1989 based on the morphology of several syringeal and skeletal features. The existence of this family has later been confirmed by multiple studies involving both mitochondrial DNA and nuclear DNA.

The cladogram below shows the phylogenetic relationships in the parvorder Tyrannida. It is based on the study by Carl Oliveros and collaborators published in 2019 and the study by Michael Harvey and collaborators that was published in 2020. The families and species numbers are from the list maintained by the International Ornithologists' Union (IOC).

- Tyrannida
  - - Tyrannidae
      tyrant flycatchers (104 genera containing 446 species)
    - - Oxyruncidae
        sharpbill
      - Onychorhynchidae
        royal flycatchers and myiobiuses (7 species)
  - Tityridae
    - - - Laniisoma – laniisomas (2 species)
        - Laniocera – mourners (2 species)
      - Schiffornis – schiffornises (7 species)
    - - Iodopleura – purpletufts (3 species)
      - - Tityra – tityras (4 species)
        - - Xenopsaris – white-naped xenopsaris
          - Pachyramphus – becards (18 species)

=== Species ===
The family contains 37 species divided into 7 genera:

Image	Genus	Living species
	Tityra Vieillot, 1816	Black-crowned tityra (Tityra inquisitor); Black-tailed tityra (Tityra cayana); Masked tityra (Tityra semifasciata)
	Schiffornis Bonaparte, 1854	Varzea schiffornis (Schiffornis major); alternatively Várzea Mourner; Brown-winged schiffornis (Schiffornis turdina); Russet-winged schiffornis (Schiffornis stenorhyncha); Foothill schiffornis (Schiffornis aenea); Northern schiffornis (Schiffornis veraepacis); Guianan schiffornis (Schiffornis olivacea); Greenish schiffornis (Schiffornis virescens); alternatively Greenish Mourner
	Laniocera Lesson, 1841	Speckled mourner (Laniocera rufescens); Cinereous mourner (Laniocera hypopyrra)
	Iodopleura Lesson, 1839	White-browed purpletuft (Iodopleura isabellae); Dusky purpletuft (Iodopleura fusca); Buff-throated purpletuft (Iodopleura pipra)
	Laniisoma Swainson, 1832	Brazilian laniisoma (Laniisoma elegans); Andean laniisoma (Laniisoma buckleyi)
	Xenopsaris Ridgway, 1891	White-naped xenopsaris (Xenopsaris albinucha)
	Pachyramphus Gould & G.R. Gray, 1839	Green-backed becard (Pachyramphus viridis); Yellow-cheeked becard (Pachyramphus xanthogenys); Barred becard (Pachyramphus versicolor); Slaty becard (Pachyramphus spodiurus); Cinereous becard (Pachyramphus rufus); Cinnamon becard (Pachyramphus cinnamomeus); Chestnut-crowned becard (Pachyramphus castaneus); White-winged becard (Pachyramphus polychopterus); Black-and-white becard (Pachyramphus albogriseus); Cryptic becard (Pachyramphus salvini); Grey-collared becard (Pachyramphus major); Black-capped becard (Pachyramphus marginatus); Glossy-backed becard (Pachyramphus surinamus); Rose-throated becard (Pachyramphus aglaiae); Jamaican becard (Pachyramphus niger); One-colored becard (Pachyramphus homochrous); Pink-throated becard (Pachyramphus minor); Crested becard (Pachyramphus validus)
