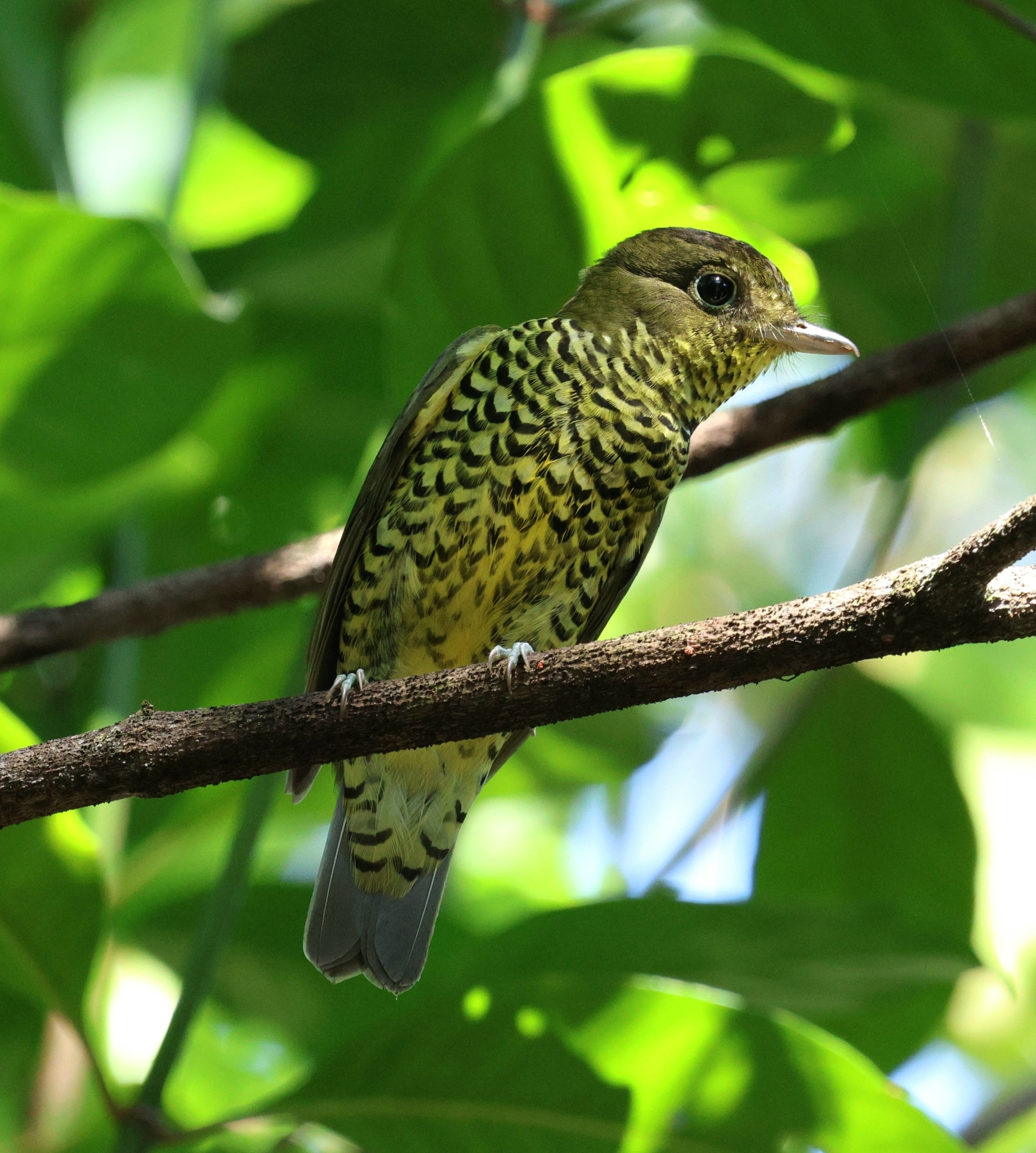
- Brazilian laniisoma (Laniisoma elegans) in Bertioga, São Paulo, Brazil

Scientific classification
- Kingdom: Animalia
- Phylum: Chordata
- Class: Aves
- Order: Passeriformes
- Family: Tityridae
- Subfamily: Tityrinae
- Genus: Laniisoma; Swainson, 1832

Type species
- Laniisoma arcuatum Swainson, 1832

= Laniisoma =

Genus of birds

Laniisoma is a genus of passerine birds in the family Tityridae native to South America. The genus contains two species:

Image	Scientific name	Common name	Distribution
	Laniisoma elegans	Brazilian laniisoma	Mata Atlântica (Atlantic forest) in southeastern Brazil
	Laniisoma buckleyi	Andean laniisoma	Andes Mountains in Venezuela, Colombia, Ecuador, Peru and Bolivia
