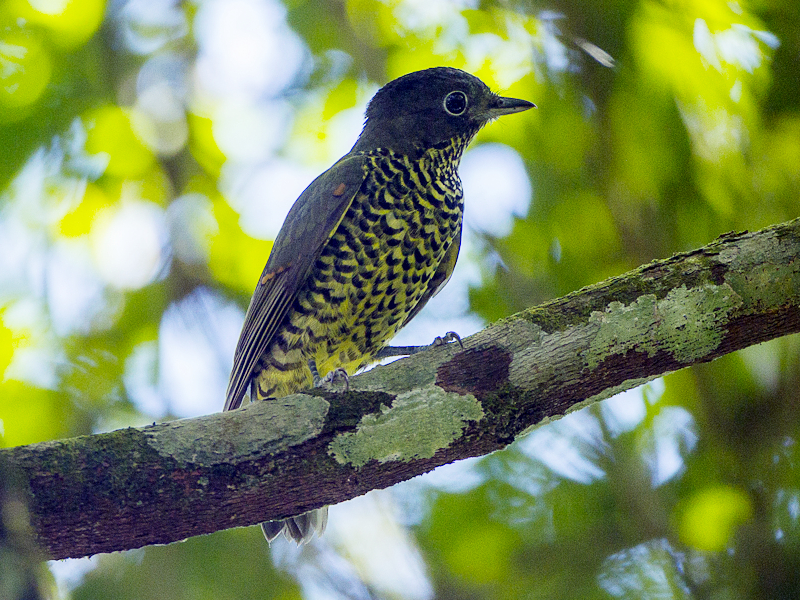

Conservation status
- Least Concern (IUCN 3.1)

Scientific classification
- Kingdom: Animalia
- Phylum: Chordata
- Class: Aves
- Order: Passeriformes
- Family: Tityridae
- Genus: Laniisoma
- Species: L. elegans

Binomial name
- Laniisoma elegans (Thunberg, 1823)

= Brazilian laniisoma =

Species of bird

The Brazilian laniisoma (Laniisoma elegans) is a species of bird in the family Tityridae, the tityras, becards, and allies. It is endemic to Brazil.

== Taxonomy and systematics ==
The Brazilian laniisoma's taxonomy is not fully resolved and it is also known by several other English names. It was originally described in 1823 as Ampelis elegans. William Swainson erected its present genus Laniisoma in 1832 and what is now Laniisoma elegans was later recognized as its type species.

Laniisoma elegans was long treated as the sole species in the genus. The South American Classification Committee retains that treatment and calls the species the shrike-like cotinga. However, the committee recognizes that the species is probably not monotypic and is seeking a proposal to revise its treatment. It further recognizes that the name "cotinga" is no longer appropriate but rejected a proposal to change it.

The IOC, the Clements taxonomy, AviList, and BirdLife International's Handbook of the Birds of the World (HBW) have all separated Laniisoma buckleyi from L. elegans, leaving the latter as monotypic and calling it the "Brazilian laniisoma". The IOC, Clements, and AviList call L. buckleyi the Andean laniisoma and assign it three subspecies. HBW has split the two but calls L. buckleyi the "elegant laniisoma" and treats it as monotypic. L. elegans has also been called the "elegant mourner" and the "shrike-like cotinga". While the latter name implies a shrike-like appearance in the species, only a few characteristics overlap.

This article follows the IOC et al. treatment of the Brazilian laniisoma as a monotypic species.

== Description ==
The Brazilian laniisoma is 18.5 to 20.5 cm (7.3 to 8.1 in) long and weighs about 41 to 51 g (1.4 to 1.8 oz). The sexes have similar plumage. They have a long bill with a hooked tip. Adult males have a deep black crown and a pale eye-ring on an otherwise olive-green face. Their upperparts are mostly bright olive-green with dusky edges on the flight feathers. Their underparts are bright golden-yellow with irregular black scale-like markings on the sides of the throat, on the breast, along the sides and flanks, and in the ventral region. Adult females have a lighter dusky olive-green crown than males and their undersides are almost completely covered with the black markings. Both sexes have a dark red to blackish iris, a blackish maxilla, a pale horn mandible, and bluish gray or steel gray legs.

== Distribution and habitat ==
The Brazilian laniisoma is a bird of the Atlantic Forest. It is found in southeastern Brazil from Alagoas south to eastern Santa Catarina. Its range extends somewhat inland in the southern part and there are a few scattered records outside of its core range. It inhabits humid primary forest and mature secondary forest and favors areas heavy with moss and vines. It occurs mostly between elevations of 100 and 900 m (300 and 3,000 ft) but there is one record at 2,000 m (6,600 ft).

== Behavior ==
=== Movement ===
The Brazilian laniisoma appears to be a year-round resident at lower elevations and to inhabit the upper elevations only in the austral summer.

=== Feeding ===
The Brazilian laniisoma feeds on adult and larval insects and on fruit. Few details are known but its diet includes Lepidoptera caterpillars and Melastomataceae berries. It typically remains perched for long periods and grabs food from vegetation and branches with short flights. It occasionally joins mixed-species feeding flocks.

=== Breeding ===
The Brazilian laniisoma apparently breeds during the austral spring and summer but nothing concrete is known about its breeding biology.

=== Vocalization ===
The Brazilian laniisoma's song is an "extr. high, downslurred piiiieh, repeated with slightly varying pitch and intervals".

== Status ==
The IUCN originally in 2016 assessed the Brazilian laniisoma as Near Threatened and since May 2025 as being of Least Concern. Its population size is not known and is believed to be decreasing. "Agricultural conversion and deforestation for mining and plantation production historically threatened lowland forests. Currently the main threats to the species are agricultural expansion, including the opening of areas for pasture, and logging." It is considered "uncommon to rare". It occurs in at least 10 protected areas both public and private. "A lack of basic information on distribution and ecology hampers reassessment of its global conservation status; in particular, our very incomplete understanding of the species’ elevational movements...impedes knowledge of how important it will be to protect habitat over much of the elevational gradient across the species’ range to secure its survival."
