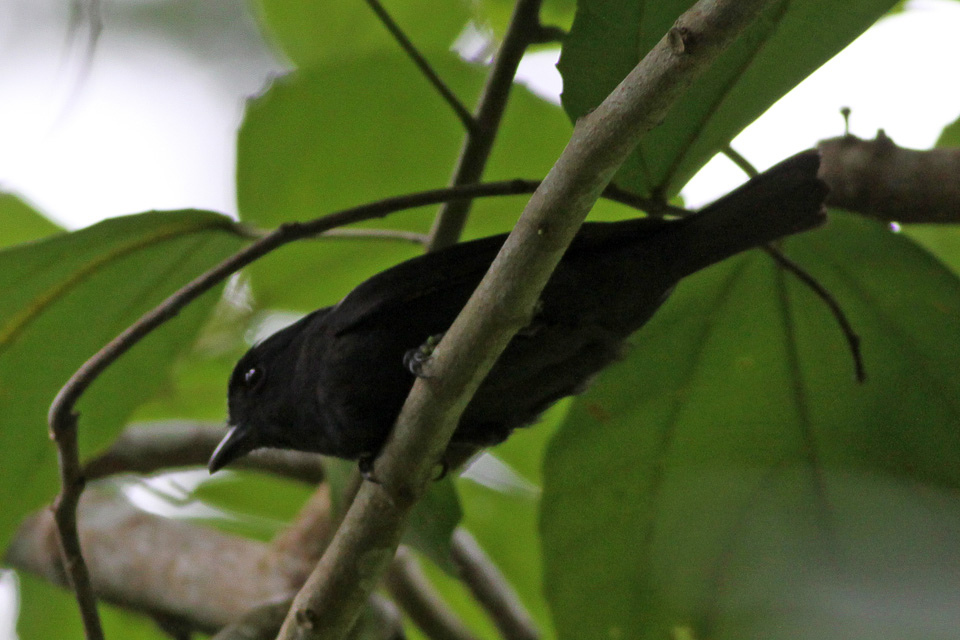

Conservation status
- Least Concern (IUCN 3.1)

Scientific classification
- Kingdom: Animalia
- Phylum: Chordata
- Class: Aves
- Order: Passeriformes
- Family: Tityridae
- Genus: Pachyramphus
- Species: P. niger

Binomial name
- Pachyramphus niger (Gmelin, JF, 1788)

Synonyms
- Lanius niger; Platypsaris niger

= Jamaican becard =

Species of bird

The Jamaican becard (Pachyramphus niger) is a species of bird in the family Tityridae, the tityras, becards, and allies. It is endemic to Jamaica.

== Taxonomy and systematics ==
The Jamaican becard was formally described in 1788 by the German naturalist Johann Friedrich Gmelin in his revised and expanded edition of Carl Linnaeus's Systema Naturae. He placed it with the shrikes in the genus Lanius and coined the binomial name Lanius niger. Gmelin based his description on the "black shrike" that had been described in 1781 by the English ornithologist John Latham in his book A General Synopsis of Birds. Latham had received two specimens from Jamaica.

The Jamaican becard and some other becards were for a time placed in genus Platypsaris which was merged into Pachyramphus in 1973. It is now one of 18 becards in genus Pachyramphus that had been introduced in 1839 by George Gray. The genus Pachyramphus has variously been assigned to the tyrant flycatcher family Tyrannidae and the cotinga family Cotingidae. Several early twenty-first century studies confirmed the placement of Pachyramphus in Tityridae and taxonomic systems made the reassignment. In 1998 the American Ornithological Society was unsure where to place the genus and listed its members as incertae sedis but in 2011 moved them to Tityridae.

The Jamaican becard is monotypic.

== Description ==
The Jamaican becard is about 18 cm (7.1 in) long and weighs about 39 to 41.5 g (1.4 to 1.5 oz). Adult males are entirely black except for some white at the base of the wing that shows only in flight. Adult females have a deep brown crown. Their upperparts are reddish brown. Their cheeks, throat, neck, and upper breast are cinnamon and their lower breast and the rest of their underparts are pale gray.

== Distribution and habitat ==
The Jamaican becard is found throughout the island of Jamaica. It inhabits a variety of landscapes in the tropical and lower subtropical zones, most of which are somewhat open. These include mature open forest, woodlands, and pastures with trees. It also inhabits gardens and the interior and edges of more closed forest. In elevation it ranges from sea level to 1,800 m (5,900 ft).

== Behavior ==
=== Movement ===
The Jamaican becard makes elevational movements between the seasons, moving downslope after breeding.

=== Feeding ===
The Jamaican becard feeds on insects and fruit. It gleans both with short sallies that sometimes include a brief hover. It also takes insects in mid-air.

=== Breeding ===
The Jamaican becard breeds between March and June and sometimes raises two broods. Its nest is a large bulky globe with an entrance hole near the bottom. It is made of plant materials and is suspended below a branch; it is typically high in a tree in closed forest and lower in more open landscapes. The clutch is three eggs. The incubation period, time to fledging, and details of parental care are not known.

=== Vocalization ===
The Jamaican becards main vocalization is "two hoarse quecks followed by [a] musical Co-ome and tell me what you hee-ear" that gradually rises and then falls.

== Status ==
The IUCN has assessed the Jamaican becard as being of Least Concern. It has a small range; its population size is not known and is believed to be stable. No immediate threats have been identified. It is considered "widespread and fairly common locally". Though about three quarters of Jamaica's original forest has been cleared, "this species survives well in secondary habitats and is tolerant of disturbed habitats".
