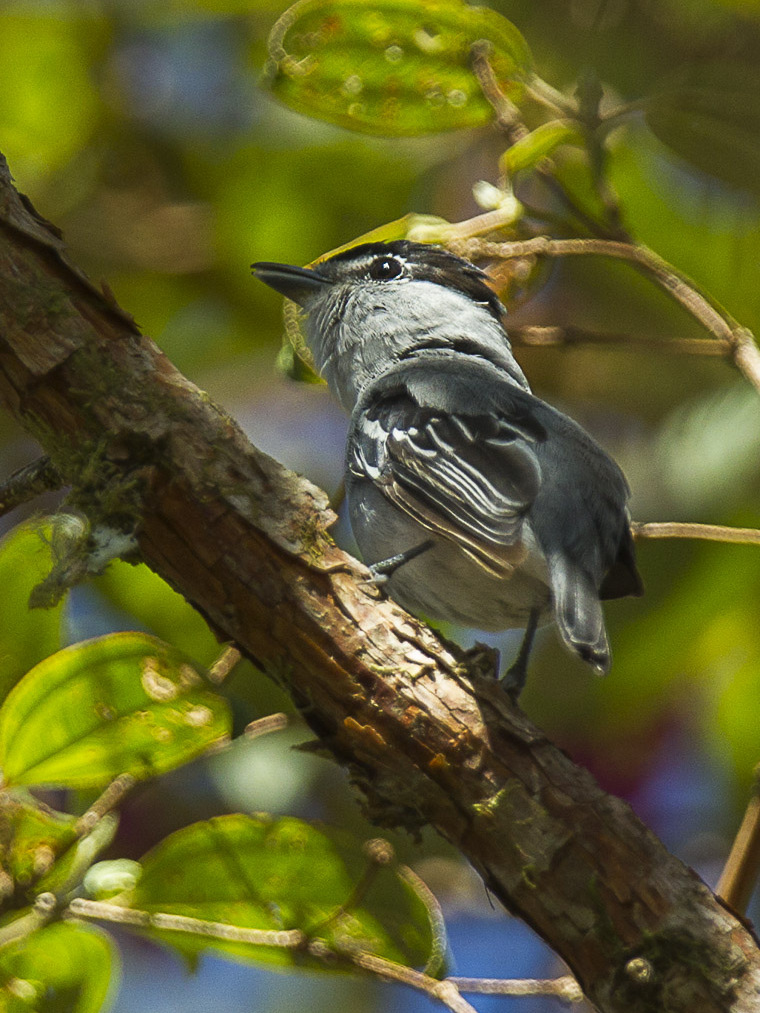

Conservation status
- Least Concern (IUCN 3.1)

Scientific classification
- Kingdom: Animalia
- Phylum: Chordata
- Class: Aves
- Order: Passeriformes
- Family: Tityridae
- Genus: Pachyramphus
- Species: P. albogriseus

Binomial name
- Pachyramphus albogriseus Sclater, PL, 1857
- Range of the black-and-white and cryptic becards; see the Taxonomy and Distribution sections

Audio
- Song of black-and-white becard

= Black-and-white becard =

Species of bird

The black-and-white becard (Pachyramphus albogriseus) is a species of bird in the family Tityridae, the tityras, becards, and allies. Sources differ on its range; all agree it is found in Colombia, Costa Rica, Panama, and Venezuela and some add Ecuador and Peru.

== Taxonomy and systematics ==
The black-and-white becard was originally described in 1857 as Pachyramphus albo-griseus. The genus Pachyramphus has variously been assigned to the tyrant flycatcher family Tyrannidae and the cotinga family Cotingidae. Several early twenty-first century studies confirmed the placement of Pachyramphus in Tityridae and taxonomic systems made the reassignment. In 1998 the American Ornithological Society was unsure where to place the genus and listed its members as incertae sedis but in 2011 moved them to Tityridae.

The black-and-white becard's further taxonomy is unsettled. Until publication of a 2023 study taxonomists assigned it five subspecies. Following that study the IOC, the Clements taxonomy, AviList, the North American Classification Committee of the American Ornithological Society (NACC), and the independent South American Classification Committee (SACC) retained two of them, the nominate P. a. albogriseus (Sclater, PL, 1857) and P. a. ornatus (Cherrie, 1891). They split off P. a. salvini as the monotypic cryptic becard and merged P. a. coronatus and P. a. guayaquilensis into it. However, as of late 2025 BirdLife International's Handbook of the Birds of the World (HBW) retains the older five-subspecies treatment of the black-and-white becard.

The sources that assign two subspecies also do not agree on the species' range. All agree that P. a. ornatus is found in Costa Rica and Panama. They also agree that P. a. albogriseus is found in Colombia and Venezuela. The IOC, NACC, and SACC include Ecuador and Peru in the range of albogriseus; Clements and AviList do not.

This article follows the IOC/NACC/SACC model of two subspecies with a six-country range.

== Description ==
The black-and-white becard is 13.2 to 15.0 cm (5.2 to 5.9 in) long and weighs about 16 to 26 g (0.56 to 0.92 oz). Adult males of the nominate subspecies have a glossy bluish black crown. They have blackish lores, a wide white stripe from above the lores to above the eye, and a thin partial white eye-ring on an otherwise grayish face. Their nape and upperparts through their uppertail coverts are gray. Their wings are mostly black with wide white edges on the secondaries, tertials, and median and greater coverts; the last two show as wing bars. Their tail has a black upper surface and a white-tipped pale gray lower surface. Their throat and underparts are whitish to pale gray that is somewhat darker on the sides and vent area. Adult females have a chestnut-brown crown with a wide black band below it. They have a white stripe from above the lores to a partial white eye-ring and a black stripe through the eye on an otherwise pale gray and yellowish olive face. Their nape is pale grayish yellow-green and their back, rump, and uppertail coverts grayish olive to olive. Their wings are mostly blackish with wide cinnamon edges on the secondaries and coverts and thinner cinnamon edges on the primaries. Their tail has a dusky cinnamon-brown upper surface and a darker underside with wide cinnamon feather tips. Their chin and throat are white and their underparts pale yellow to greenish yellow. Males of subspecies P. a. ornatus have some dark gray on the upper side of their innermost tail feathers but are otherwise like the nominate. Females are like the nominate. Both subspecies have a brown iris, a gray maxilla and a slightly lighter gray mandible, and dark gray legs and feet with yellowish soles.

== Distribution and habitat ==
The black-and-white becard has a disjunct distribution. Subspecies P. a. ornatus is the more northerly of the two and has a smaller range. It is found from the Cordillera de Tilarán in northwestern Costa Rica south to the Serranía de Tabasará in western Panama. The nominate subspecies is found in northern Colombia's isolated Sierra Nevada de Santa Marta, in the Serranía del Perijá on the Colombia-Venezuela border, in several parts of the Venezuelan Coastal Range, and from the Andes of Venezuela into Colombia on the east side of that country's Eastern Andes. It also is found along the eastern slope of the Andes from southern Colombia through Ecuador to southern Peru.

The black-and-white becard inhabits humid foothill and montane forest that have dense understories. In elevation it ranges between 750 and 1,800 m (2,500 and 5,900 ft) in Central America. It occurs between 500 and 2,400 m (1,600 and 7,900 ft) in Colombia, between 1,200 and 2,200 m (3,900 and 7,200 ft) in Venezuela, between 900 and 2,000 m (3,000 and 6,600 ft) in Ecuador, and between 1,500 and 3,200 m (4,900 and 10,500 ft) in Peru.

== Behavior ==
=== Movement ===
The black-and-white becard is a year-round resident throughout its range though some individuals make seasonal elevational movements.

=== Feeding ===
The black-and-white becard feeds on large insects and small fruits. It usually forages singly or in pairs from the upper part of the forest understory to its canopy and sometimes joins mixed-species feeding flocks. It takes food from foliage and twigs with short fluttery sallies from a perch or by briefly hovering at the end of a sally.

=== Breeding ===
The black-and-white becard's breeding season has not been fully defined but includes March to May in Central America. Its nest is a bulky globe with an entrance near its bottom. It is made mostly from dead leaves with smaller amounts of moss and plant fibers included. It is typically in a vertical fork near the end of a branch between about 7 and 20 m (25 and 65 ft) above the ground. The clutch size, incubation period, time to fledging, and details of parental care are not known.

=== Vocalization ===
The male black-and-white becard's song is a "short soft phrase of typically three mellow notes w-tuw-tuweet?" and the species' call a "short rapid trill consisting of a few downslurred notes". Males sing mostly at dawn and in the early morning.

== Status ==
The IUCN follows HBW taxonomy and so has not separately assessed the black-and-white and cryptic becards. It treats the combination as being of Least Concern. The population size is not known and is believed to be decreasing. No immediate threats have been identified. The black-and white becard is considered rare in Costa Rica, uncommon in Colombia, "fairly common but local" in Venezuela, and uncommon in Ecuador and Peru. It occurs in several protected areas.
