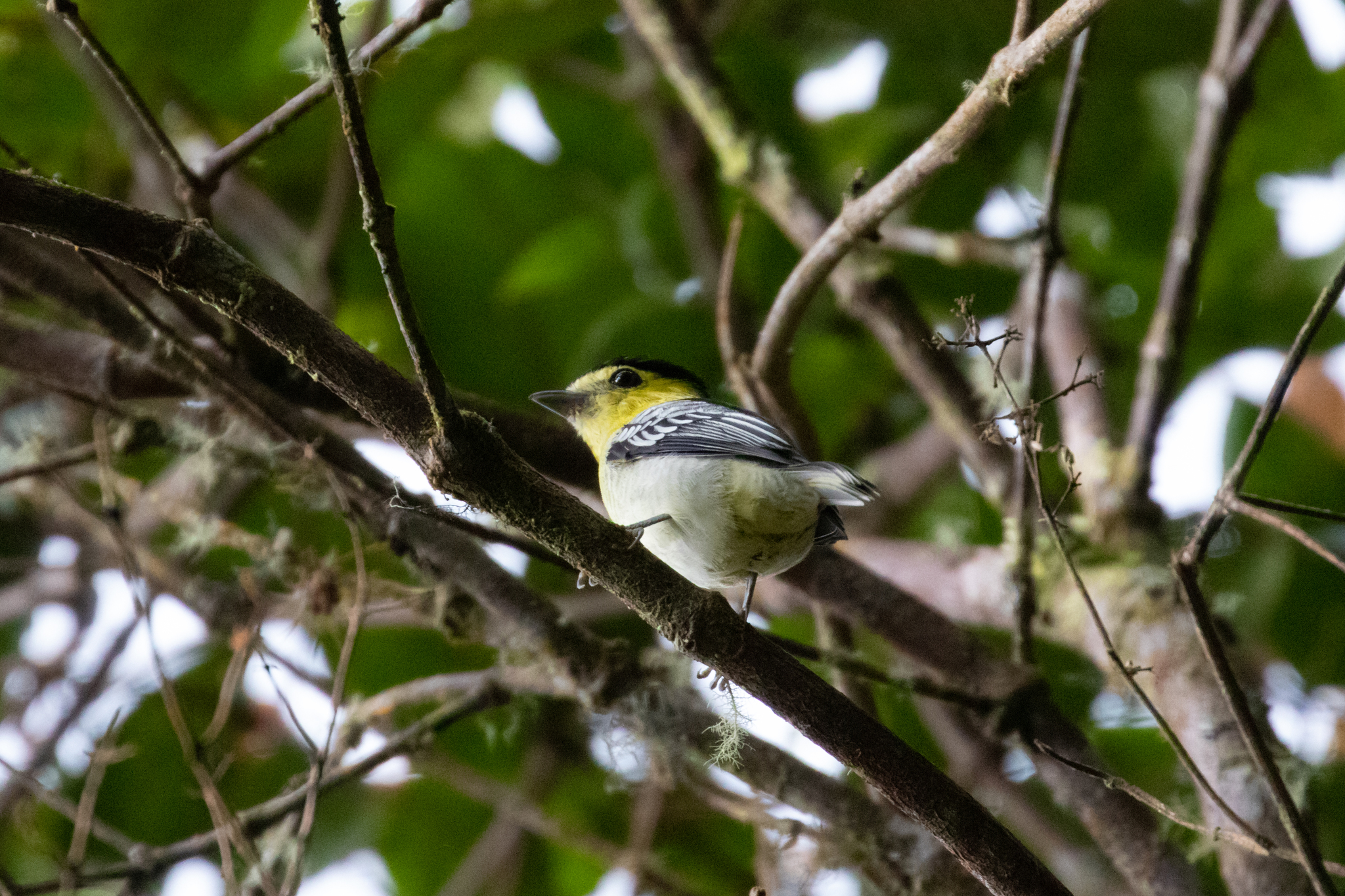
- Pachyramphus versicolor observed in Peru

Conservation status
- Least Concern (IUCN 3.1)

Scientific classification
- Kingdom: Animalia
- Phylum: Chordata
- Class: Aves
- Order: Passeriformes
- Family: Tityridae
- Genus: Pachyramphus
- Species: P. versicolor

Binomial name
- Pachyramphus versicolor (Hartlaub, 1843)

= Barred becard =

Species of bird

The barred becard (Pachyramphus versicolor) is a small passerine bird in the family Tityridae, the tityras, becards, and allies. It is found in Costa Rica, Panama, and in South America from Venezuela to Bolivia.

== Taxonomy and systematics ==
The barred becard was originally described in 1843 as Vireo versicolor. It was later reassigned to genus Pachyramphus that George Robert Gray had erected in 1840. The genus has variously been assigned to the tyrant flycatcher family Tyrannidae and the cotinga family Cotingidae. Several early twenty-first century studies confirmed the placement of Pachyramphus in Tityridae and taxonomic systems made the reassignment. In 1998 the American Ornithological Society was unsure where to place the genus and listed its members as incertae sedis but in 2011 moved them to Tityridae.

The barred becard has three subspecies, the nominate P. v. versicolor (Hartlaub, 1843), P. v. costaricensis (Bangs, 1908), and P. v. meridionalis (Carriker, 1934).

== Description ==
The barred becard is 12 to 13 cm (4.7 to 5.1 in) long and weighs 14 to 17 g (0.49 to 0.60 oz). It is the smallest member of genus Pachyramphus. Adult males of the nominate subspecies have a glossy black crown and nape and greenish yellow lores and eye-ring. Their face is also greenish yellow. Their upperparts are mostly glossy black with a slate gray rump and uppertail coverts. Their wings are black with white edges on the greater coverts and remiges. Their scapulars and lesser and median coverts are white with black edges. Their tail is slate gray with white edges on the feathers. Their throat is greenish yellow that becomes white on the rest of the underparts; these colors are overlain with thin blackish bars. Adult females have a slate gray crown and nape and a yellow eye-ring; their face is a slightly more olive yellow than the male's. Their upperparts are olive green. Their wing coverts are rufous; their flight feathers are a darker rufous with buff edges on the tertials. Their tail is brownish gray. Their breast is more olive than the male's and becomes darker on the rest of the underparts. They have dusky bars that are fainter than the male's. The other two subspecies are essentially identical to the nominate. Both sexes of all subspecies have a black iris, a black maxilla, a bluish gray mandible, and gray legs and feet.

== Distribution and habitat ==
The barred becard has a disjunct distribution. Subspecies P. v. costaricensis is the northernmost and has the smallest range of the three. It is found intermittently from the Tilarán Cordillera in Costa Rica's southern Alajuela Province south into western Panama's Chiriquí Province. The nominate subspecies is found in the Serranía del Perijá on the Colombia/Venezuela border and on the eastern slope of the Venezuelan Andes from Lara into Colombia. In Colombia it is found along both slopes of the Eastern Andes, from Norte de Santander Department south in the Central Andes, and south from Valle del Cauca Department in the Western Andes. From Colombia its distribution continues into the Andes of Ecuador, on the western slope to Chimborazo Province and on the eastern slope to Zamora-Chinchipe Province. P. v. meridionalis is found in Peru on the western Andean slope from Ecuador south to Cajamarca Department and on the eastern slope from southern Amazonas Department south to northern Puno Department. It also occurs at scattered locations in northwestern Bolivia.

The barred becard inhabits a variety of landscapes in the subtropical and lower temperate zones. These include cloudforest, elfin forest, and humid montane woodlands. It is found both in somewhat open forest and in scrubby ravines. In elevation it ranges between 1,500 and 2,300 m (4,900 and 7,500 ft) in Costa Rica, between 2,000 and 2,900 m (6,600 and 9,500 ft) in Venezuela, between 1,500 and 2,800 m (4,900 and 9,200 ft) in Colombia, mostly between 1,500 and 2,600 m (4,900 and 8,500 ft) in Ecuador, and mostly between 1,500 and 3,000 m (4,900 and 9,800 ft) though locally as low as 1,100 m (3,600 ft) in Peru.

== Behavior ==
=== Movement ===
The barred becard is a year-round resident.

=== Feeding ===
The barred becard feeds mostly on insects and also includes small fruits in its diet. It forages mostly from the forest's mid-story to the canopy though will go lower at the forest's edge. It forages singly, in pairs, and in family groups and joins for short time mixed-species feeding flocks. They take food while perched, while hopping along branches, with short sallies to grab it, and during brief hovers at the end of a sally.

=== Breeding ===
The barred becard's breeding season or seasons have not been determined but includes May and June in Costa Rica. Its nest is a globe made from moss, leaves, grass, bark, and lichens with a side entrance. Most have been discovered in fairly open areas such as the forest edge, along rivers, and in pastures. They range between about 3 and 30 m (10 and 100 ft) above the ground and are built by both sexes. The clutch is two eggs that are white with darker flecks. The incubation period and time to fledging are not known. Both parents provision nestlings.

=== Vocalization ===
The barred becard's song has been described as a "rising or rising-falling, accelerating series of thin, high whistles: wur wee WEE-WEE’WEE’WEE-WEE" and its calls as "thin, squeaky wsee notes in a chattered series".

== Status ==
The IUCN has assessed the barred becard as being of Least Concern. It has an extremely large range; its estimated population of at least 500,000 mature individuals is believed to be decreasing. No immediate threats have been identified. It is considered "fairly uncommon" in Costa Rica, "uncommon to fairly common" in Venezuela, and "fairly common" in Colombia, Ecuador, and Peru. Their "preference towards disturbed land for nesting could suggest that their population as a whole would have at least some resistance towards the effects of deforestation".
