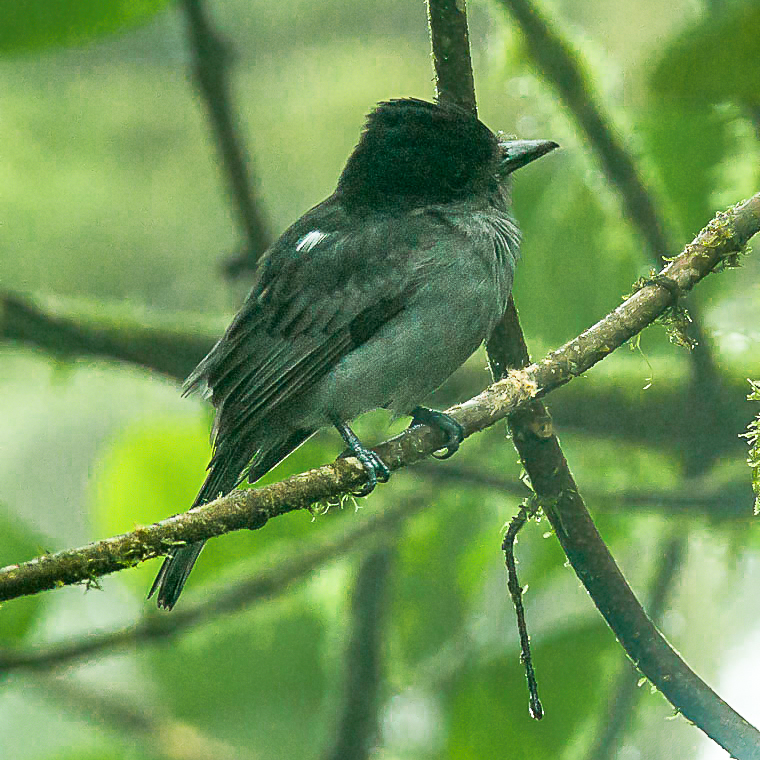
- Male

Conservation status
- Least Concern (IUCN 3.1)

Scientific classification
- Kingdom: Animalia
- Phylum: Chordata
- Class: Aves
- Order: Passeriformes
- Family: Tityridae
- Genus: Pachyramphus
- Species: P. homochrous

Binomial name
- Pachyramphus homochrous Sclater, PL, 1859

Synonyms
- Platypsaris homochrous

= One-colored becard =

Species of bird

The one-colored becard (Pachyramphus homochrous) is a species of bird in the family Tityridae, the tityras, becards, and allies. It is found in Colombia, Ecuador, Panama, Peru, and Venezuela.

== Taxonomy and systematics ==
The one-colored becard was originally described in 1859 as Pachyramphus homochrous, its current binomial. For a time it and several other becards were placed in genus Platypsaris which was merged by most taxonomists into Pachyramphus in 1973. It is now one of 18 becards in genus Pachyramphus that had been introduced in 1839 by George Gray. The genus Pachyramphus has variously been assigned to the tyrant flycatcher family Tyrannidae and the cotinga family Cotingidae. Several early twenty-first century studies confirmed the placement of Pachyramphus in Tityridae and taxonomic systems made the reassignment. In 1998 the American Ornithological Society was unsure where to place the genus and listed its members as incertae sedis but in 2011 moved them to Tityridae.

The one-colored becard has three subspecies, the nominate P. h. homochrous (Sclater, PL, 1859), P. h. quimarinus (Meyer de Schauensee, 1950), and P. h. canescens (Chapman, 1912).

== Description ==
The one-colored becard is about 16.5 cm (6.5 in) long and weighs about 35 g (1.2 oz). The species is sexually dimorphic. Adult males of the nominate subspecies have a mostly dark slaty gray head and upperparts with a slightly darker crown and lighter rump. Their wings and tail are dark slaty gray with paler edges on the remiges. Their underparts are a somewhat paler gray their upperparts. They sometimes have a faint pinkish wash on the throat and a slight dusky tinge on the breast and upper belly. Adult females have a rufous-chestnut to rufous tawny crown, upperparts, and tail. Their wings have cinnamon-edged primaries and cinnamon-edged rufous secondaries and coverts. They have a whitish cinnamon spot above the lores on an otherwise buff-cinnamon face. Their underparts are mostly buffy cinnamon that is more whitish and cinnamon on the throat. Subspecies P. h. quimarinus is like the nominate. P. h. canescens has a slightly lighter throat and belly than the nominate.

== Distribution and habitat ==
The nominate subspecies of the one-colored becard has the largest range of the three. It is found in central and eastern Panama, on the Caribbean slope in the Canal area, on both slopes in eastern Panamá Province, and in the Pacific lowlands in Darién Province. Its range continues south on the Pacific slope of Colombia's Western Andes at least to southern Chocó Department. One source shows its range in the country continuing all the way to Ecuador. Its range further encompasses the entire length of western Ecuador and continues into northwestern Peru's Tumbes and Piura departments. Subspecies P. h. quimarinus is found in the northwestern Colombian departments of Antioquia, Bolívar, and Magdalena. P. h. canescens is found in Colombia to the northeast of quimarinus in Bolívar and Magdalena and in Venezuela on the eastern side of the Serranía del Perijá and the eastern and western sides of Lake Maracaibo.

The one-colored becard inhabits a variety of forest types in the tropical zone. These include humid evergreen forest, dryer deciduous forest, gallery forest, and secondary forest. It also is found in clearings and arid scrublands that have tall trees. In elevation it overall is mostly found from sea level to 900 m (3,000 ft). It reaches 1,000 m (3,300 ft) in Colombia, 1,500 m (4,900 ft) in Ecuador, 700 m (2,300 ft) in Peru, and 500 m (1,600 ft) in Venezuela.

== Behavior ==
=== Movement ===
The one-colored becard is a year-round resident.

=== Feeding ===
The one-colored becard feeds on insects and fruit. It usually forages in pairs though sometimes singly and joins mixed-species feeding flocks about as often as it remains apart from them. It forages from the forest's mid-story to its subcanopy, usually at the forest edges.

=== Breeding ===
The only information on the one-colored becard's breeding biology comes from a 2010 publication. Nests were found in southwestern Ecuador in February and March. They were irregular balls with a side entrance hanging from a tree branch between about 4 and 14 m (15 and 45 ft) above the ground. They were made from dry grass and weeds lined with feathers and soft plant material. The clutches were of three and four eggs. The incubation period is not known but the time to fledging was estimated at 24 to 29 days after hatch.

=== Vocalization ===
The one-colored becard's usual song is "a rather variable, loud, sharp, and sputtering or chattering stet-ee-ee-teet-tsit-tsit-tsitts-tsít or ske-e-et’et’ittt, tseer, tsrip". It also often gives a "squeaky and high-pitched tweíuuw".

== Status ==
The IUCN has assessed the one-colored becard as being of Least Concern. It has a large range; its estimated population of at least 50,000 mature individuals is believed to be decreasing. No immediate threats have been identified. Overall it is considered to occur locally rather than continuously. It is "fairly common" in Colombia, "widespread and locally fairly common" in Ecuador, and "uncommon to locally fairly common" in Peru. It is known from only a few records in Venezuela. It occurs in several protected areas, most of them in Ecuador.
