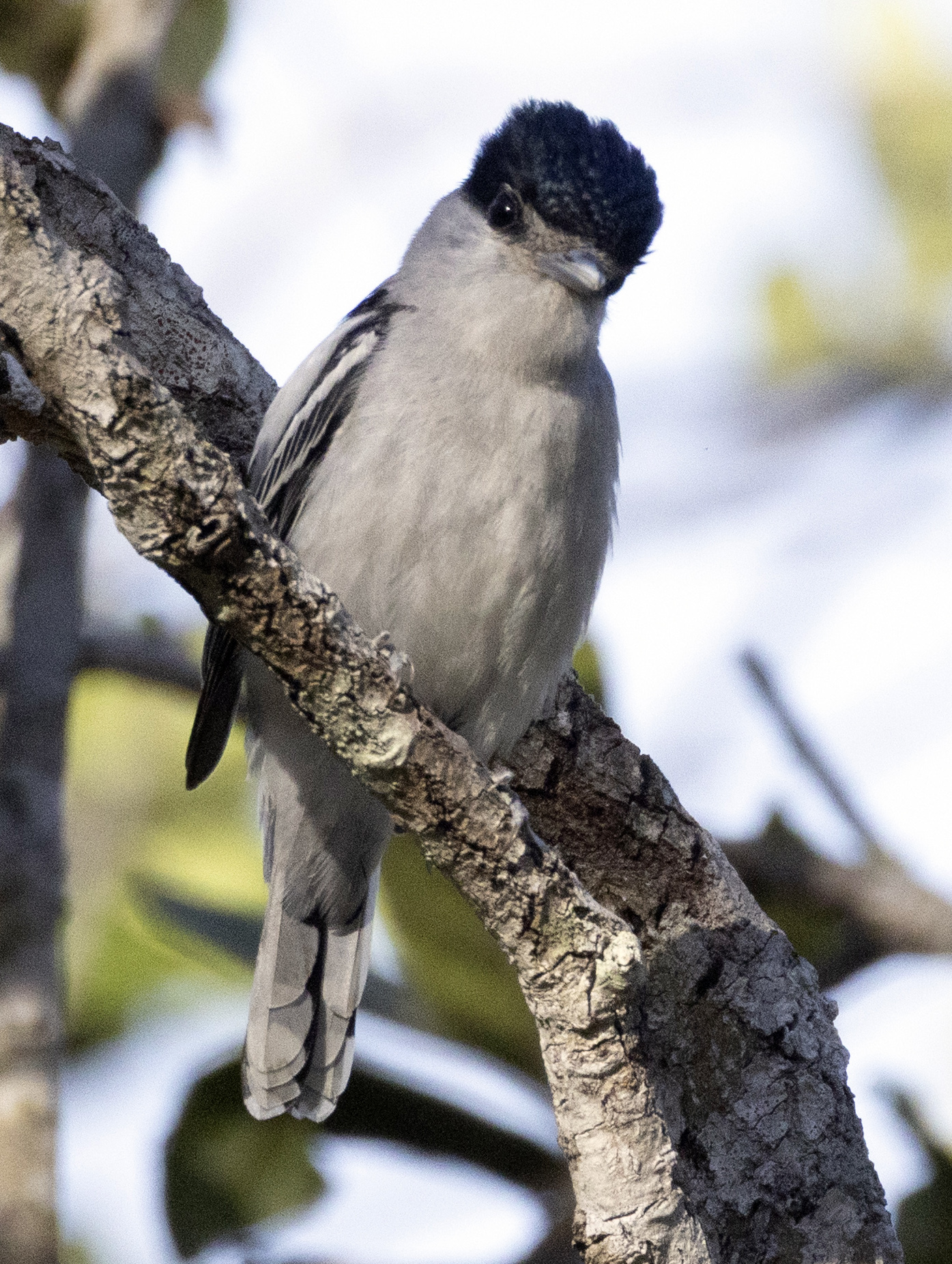
- Male, Cabo Corrientes, Mexico
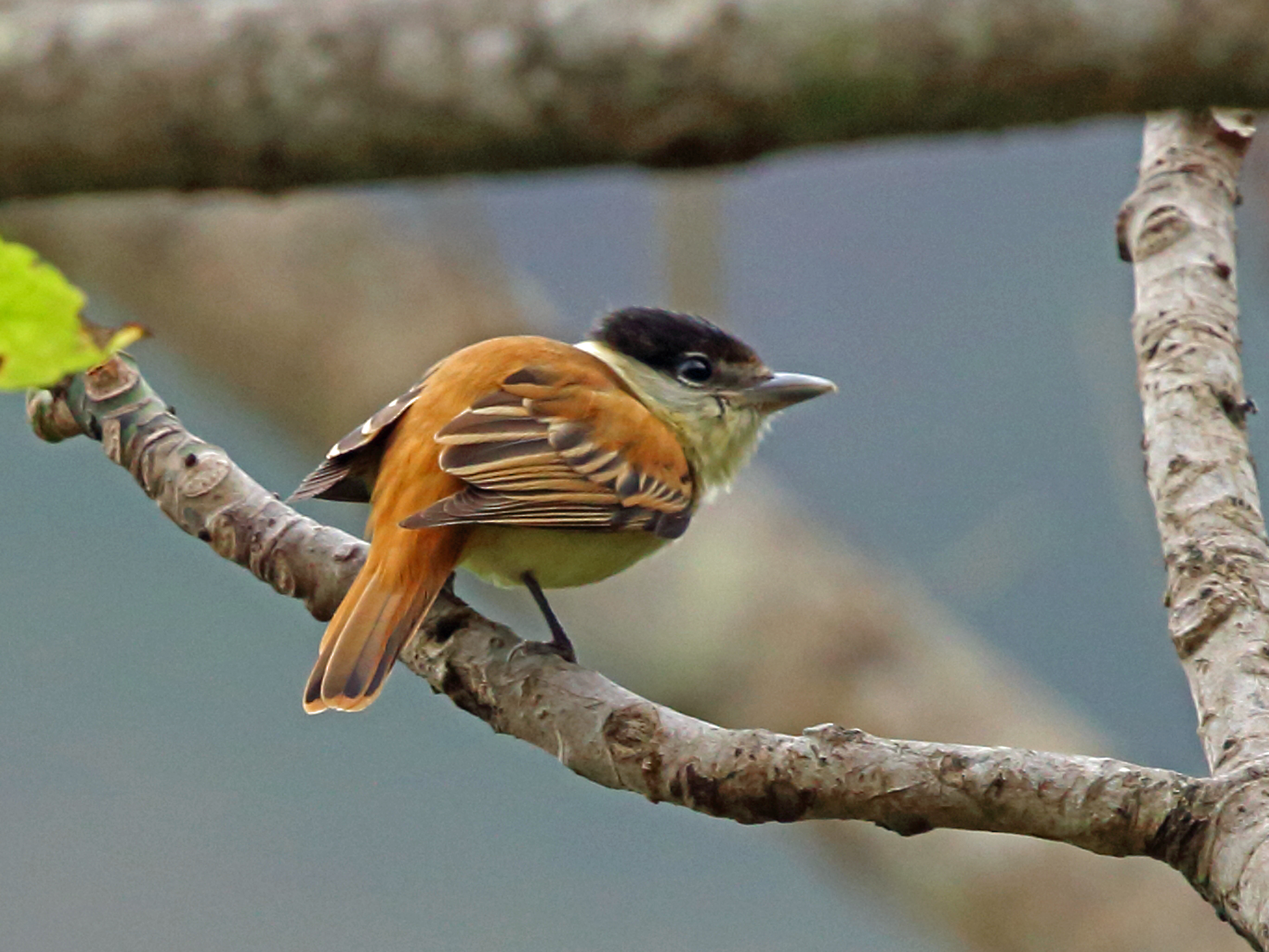
- Female, La Concordia, Mexico

Conservation status
- Least Concern (IUCN 3.1)

- Least Concern (IUCN 3.1)

Scientific classification
- Kingdom: Animalia
- Phylum: Chordata
- Class: Aves
- Order: Passeriformes
- Family: Tityridae
- Genus: Pachyramphus
- Species: P. major

Binomial name
- Pachyramphus major (Cabanis, 1847)

Synonyms
- Bathmidurus major (protonym)

= Grey-collared becard =

Species of bird

The grey-collared becard (Pachyramphus major) is a species of bird in the family Tityridae, the tityras, becards, and allies. It is found in Belize, El Salvador, Guatemala, Honduras, Mexico, and Nicaragua. It has also occurred as a vagrant in Arizona and Texas.

== Taxonomy and systematics ==
The grey-collared becard was originally described in 1847 as Bathmidurus major. It was eventually placed in its present genus Pachyramphus. That genus has variously been assigned to the tyrant flycatcher family Tyrannidae and the cotinga family Cotingidae. Several early twenty-first century studies confirmed the placement of Pachyramphus in Tityridae and taxonomic systems made the reassignment. In 1998 the American Ornithological Society was unsure where to place the genus and listed its members as incertae sedis but in 2011 moved them to Tityridae.

The grey-collared becard's further taxonomy is unsettled. The IOC, the Clements taxonomy, AviList, and the North American Classification Committee of the American Ornithological Society (NACC) assign it these five subspecies:

- P. m. uropygialis Nelson, 1899
- P. m. major (Cabanis, 1847)
- P. m. matudai Phillips, AR, 1966
- P. m. itzensis Nelson, 1901
- P. m. australis Miller, W & Griscom, 1925

However, as of late 2025 BirdLife International's Handbook of the Birds of the World (HBW) treats P. m. uropygialis as a separate species, the "western grey-collared becard" and calls P. major the "eastern grey-collard becard".

This article follows the IOC/Clements/AviList/NACC five-subspecies model.

== Description ==
The grey-collared becard is 14 to 16.3 cm (5.5 to 6.4 in) long and weighs about 21 to 28 g (0.74 to 0.99 oz). Adult males of the nominate subspecies P. m. major have a glossy black crown. They have a pale stripe above the lores and an otherwise light gray face. The gray of their face wraps around their neck as a collar. Their back is black, sometimes with gray mottling, and their rump and uppertail coverts are gray. Their wings are mostly black with a white stripe on the scapulars and white edges on the coverts, secondaries, and tertials. Their tail is black with white tips on the outer feathers. Their throat and underparts are a uniform light gray. Adult females have a blackish brown to glossy blackish crown. They have a pale stripe above the lores on an otherwise pale cinnamon to tawny-buff face. The color of their face wraps around their neck as a collar. Their upperparts are cinnamon-brown. Their wings are mostly blackish with wide cinnamon to cinnamon-brown edges on the coverts, secondaries, and tertials. Their tail is mostly cinnamon-brown with wide cinnamon tips on the feathers. Their throat and underparts are buff to cinnamon-buff.

The other subspecies of the grey-collared becard differ from the nominate and each other thus:

- P. m. uropygialis: (male) whitish rump and uppertail coverts (female) rufous crown and lemon face and underparts
- P. m. matudai: (female) buffy-lemon underparts
- P. m. itzensis: (male) mostly gray back
- P. m. australis: (male) paler than nominate (female) darker than nominate

All subspecies have a dark iris, a blackish bill with sometimes some grayish pink on the mandible, and dark gray legs and feet.

== Distribution and habitat ==
The subspecies of the grey-colored becard are found thus:

- P. m. uropygialis: western Mexico from southern Sonora south to Guerrero and Oaxaca
- P. m. major: eastern Mexico from southern Nuevo León south to Oaxaca and western Chiapas
- P. m. matudai: on the Pacific slope from Chiapas south to southern Guatemala
- P. m. itzensis: Campeche, Yucatán, and Quintana Roo in southeastern Mexico (and see below)
- P. m. australis: El Salvador, Honduras, and north-central Nicaragua (and see below)

The population in Belize and northern Guatemala belongs to either P. m. itzensis or P. m. australis.

The grey-collared becard inhabits several types of humid to semi-arid forest in the tropical and subtropical zones. These include evergreen, deciduous, and especially pine-oak types. In elevation it ranges from sea level to 2,500 m (8,200 ft).

== Behavior ==
=== Movement ===
The grey-collared becard appears to make elevational movements, at least in Mexico, where it breeds in higher elevations and winters lower.

=== Feeding ===
The grey-collared becard feeds on insects and fruits. It apparently forages mostly singly or in pairs and occasionally joins mixed species feeding flocks. It forages mostly from the forest's mid-story to its canopy.

=== Breeding ===
The grey-collared becard's breeding season has not been defined but apparently spans at least May to August. Its one described nest was found in August. It was a globe with a side entrance, made of lichen, twigs, and pine needles with a "roof" of bark strips held with spider web. It was in a fork in an oak tree about 10 m (35 ft) above the ground. Both parents provisioned its nestlings. The clutch size, incubation period, time to fledging, and other details of parental care are not known.

=== Vocalization ===
The grey-collared becard's song is "a rich and constantly repeated (usually 4–6 times, and ten in c. 10 seconds) hoo wee-deet or hu whi-ditt whistle". Its call is a "begging-like eeuup-eeuup-eeuup" and it occasionally makes "squabbles and nasal agitated notes".

== Status ==
The IUCN follows HBW taxonomy and so has separately assessed the "western" and "eastern" grey-collared becards. The population size of neither is known and both are believed to be decreasing. No immediate threats to either have been identified. The grey-collared becard is considered uncommon to fairly common overall. In northern Central America it is rare to uncommon on the Caribbean slope and rare and local on the Pacific slope. It occurs in a few protected areas.
