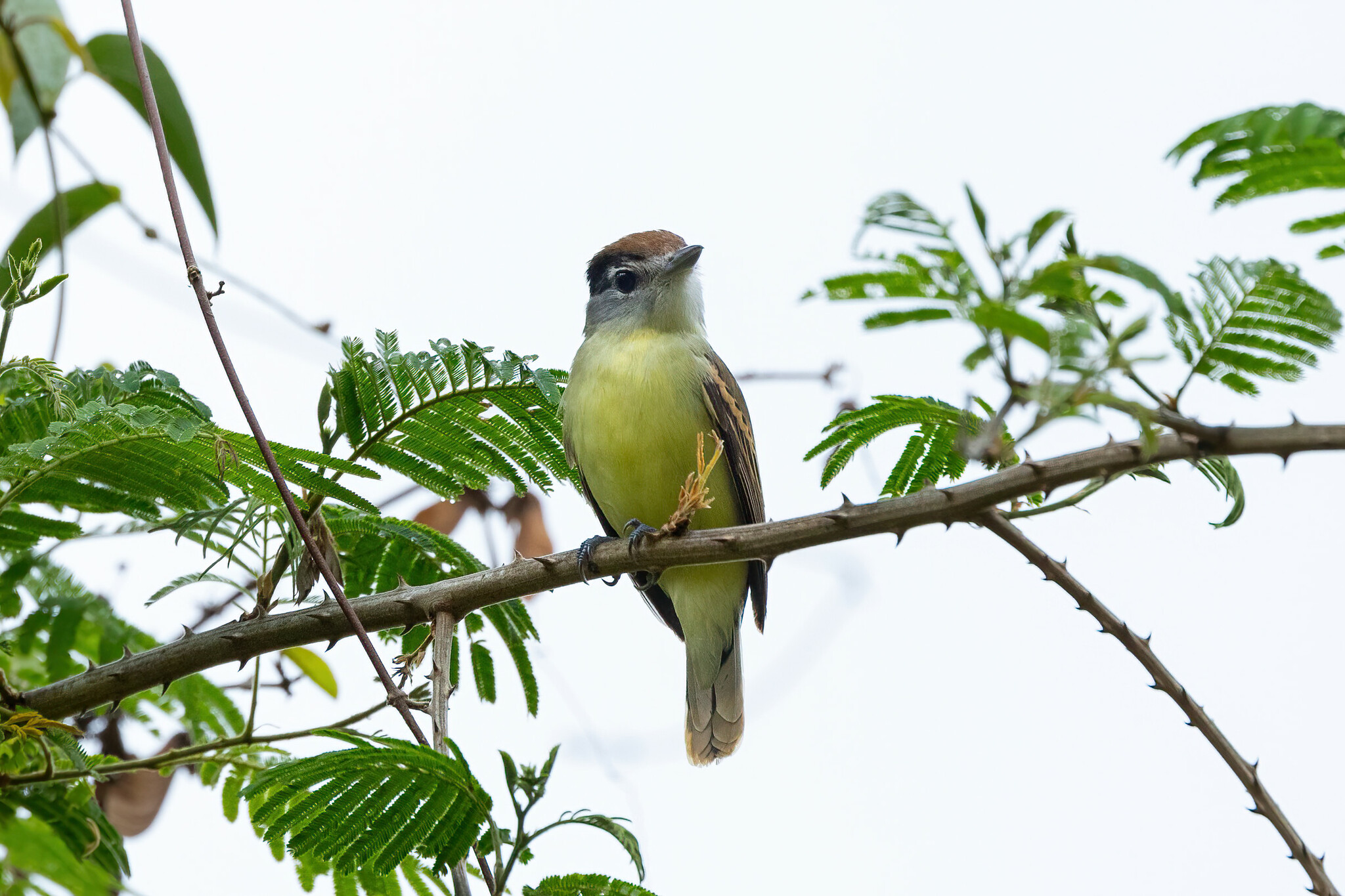

Scientific classification
- Kingdom: Animalia
- Phylum: Chordata
- Class: Aves
- Order: Passeriformes
- Family: Tityridae
- Genus: Pachyramphus
- Species: P. salvini

Binomial name
- Pachyramphus salvini Richmond, 1899

= Cryptic becard =

Species of bird

The cryptic becard (Pachyramphus salvini) is a species of bird in the family Tityridae, the tityras, becards, and allies. It is found in Colombia, Ecuador, and Peru.

== Taxonomy and systematics ==
The cryptic becard was originally called Pachyramphus similis but in 1899 Richmond noted that the binomial had earlier been used for a different species. Following the principle of priority he assigned its current binomial Pachyramphus salvini. The genus Pachyramphus has variously been assigned to the tyrant flycatcher family Tyrannidae and the cotinga family Cotingidae. Several early twenty-first century studies confirmed the placement of Pachyramphus in Tityridae and taxonomic systems made the reassignment.

The cryptic becard's further taxonomy is unsettled. Until publication of a 2023 study it was treated as a subspecies of the black-and-white becard (P. albogriseus). Following that study the IOC, the Clements taxonomy, AviList, the North American Classification Committee of the American Ornithological Society (NACC), and the independent South American Classification Committee (SACC) split it as a monotypic species. However, as of late 2025 BirdLife International's Handbook of the Birds of the World (HBW) retains it as a subspecies of the black-and-white becard.

== Description ==
The cryptic becard is about 14 cm (5.5 in) long and weighs an average of about 17 g (0.60 oz). Adult males have a glossy bluish black crown. They have blackish lores, a wide white stripe from above the lores to above the eye, and a thin partial white eye-ring on an otherwise grayish face. Their nape and upperparts through their uppertail coverts are gray. Their wings are mostly black with wide white edges on the secondaries, tertials, and median and greater coverts; the last two show as wing bars. Their tail has a black upper surface and a white-tipped pale gray lower surface. Their throat and underparts are whitish to pale gray that is somewhat darker on the sides. Adult females have a chestnut-brown crown with a wide black band below it. They have a white stripe from above the lores to a partial white eye-ring and a black stripe through the eye on an otherwise pale gray and yellowish olive face. Their nape is pale grayish yellow-green and their back, rump, and uppertail coverts olive. Their wings are mostly blackish with wide cinnamon edges on the secondaries and coverts and thinner cinnamon edges on the primaries. Their tail has a dusky cinnamon-brown upper surface and a darker underside with wide cinnamon feather tips. Their chin and throat are white and their underparts pale yellow to greenish yellow. Both sexes have a brown iris, a gray maxilla and a slightly darker gray mandible, and dark gray legs and feet with yellowish soles.

== Distribution and habitat ==
The cryptic becard is found along the western slope of the Andes from southern Antioquia Department in Colombia south through western Ecuador and on both the western and eastern slopes in northwestern Peru to La Libertad and San Martín departments. It also occurs in small numbers on the eastern slope from central Ecuador south. It inhabits rather dry thorn forest, somewhat moister semi-deciduous forest, and humid foothill and montane forest. It also occurs in secondary forest and agricultural areas like coffee plantations and pastures. In elevation it ranges between 500 and 2,400 m (1,600 and 7,900 ft) in Colombia, from sea level to 2,000 m (6,600 ft) in Ecuador, and between 1,500 and 3,200 m (4,900 and 10,500 ft) in Peru.

== Behavior ==
=== Movement ===
The cryptic becard is a year-round resident throughout its range though some individuals make seasonal movements to the eastern slope of the Andes.

=== Feeding ===
The cryptic becard feeds on arthropods and small fruits. It usually forages singly or in pairs in the upper levels of the forest and sometimes joins mixed-species feeding flocks. It takes food from foliage and twigs with short fluttery sallies from a perch or by briefly hovering at the end of a sally.

=== Breeding ===
The cryptic becard's breeding season has not been fully defined but appears to span at least from February to May. Its nest is a bulky globe with an entrance near its bottom. It is made mostly from dead leaves with smaller amounts of moss and plant fibers included; both sexes build it. It is typically in a vertical fork near the end of a branch between about 7 and 10 m (25 and 35 ft) above the ground. The clutch size, incubation period, time to fledging, and details of parental care are not known.

=== Vocalization ===
The cryptic becard's song is a "short stereotypic phrase of typically three notes tu-tu-dwit?" and it also makes a "rapid stuttered trill tjududududuwit" that might be a variation of the song. Males sing mostly at dawn and in the early morning.

== Status ==
The IUCN follows HBW taxonomy and so has not separately assessed the cryptic becard but rather includes it in the assessment of the black-and-white becard. The cryptic becard is considered uncommon throughout its range. It occurs in a few protected areas in Ecuador and Peru.
