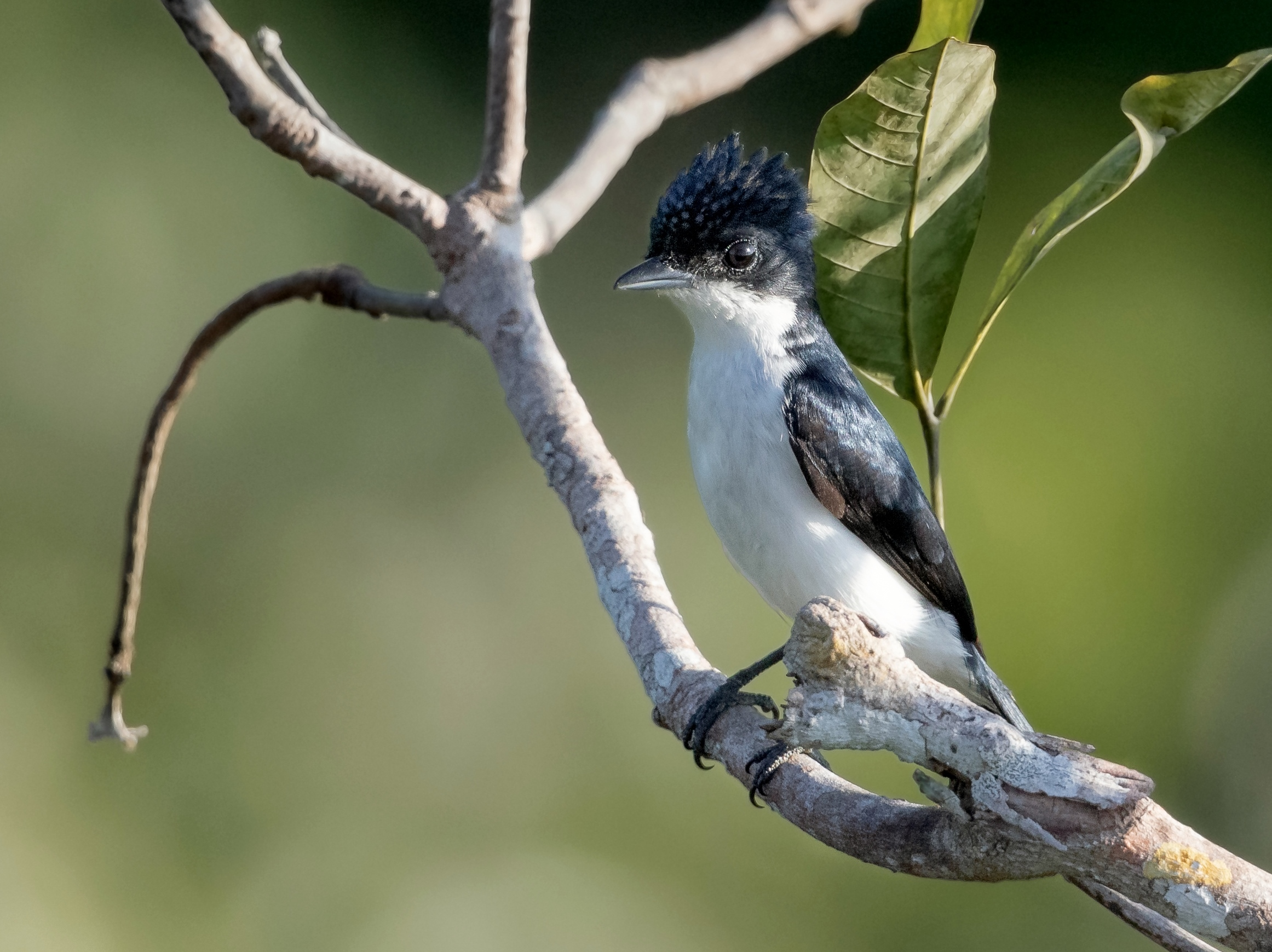

Conservation status
- Least Concern (IUCN 3.1)

Scientific classification
- Kingdom: Animalia
- Phylum: Chordata
- Class: Aves
- Order: Passeriformes
- Family: Tityridae
- Genus: Pachyramphus
- Species: P. surinamus

Binomial name
- Pachyramphus surinamus (Linnaeus, 1766)

Synonyms
- Muscicapa surinama

= Glossy-backed becard =

Species of bird

The glossy-backed becard (Pachyramphus surinamus) is a species of bird in the family Tityridae, the tityras, becards, and allies. It is found in Brazil, French Guiana, Guyana, Suriname, and Venezuela.

== Taxonomy and systematics ==
The glossy-backed becard was originally described in 1766 as Muscicapa surinama, mistakenly placing it with the Old World flycatchers. It was eventually placed in its present genus Pachyramphus. That genus has variously been assigned to the tyrant flycatcher family Tyrannidae and the cotinga family Cotingidae. Several early twenty-first century studies confirmed the placement of Pachyramphus in Tityridae and taxonomic systems made the reassignment.

The glossy-backed becard is monotypic.

== Description ==
The glossy-backed becard is about 13 to 14 cm (5.1 to 5.5 in) long and weighs about 20 g (0.71 oz). Adult males are glossy black with a slight bluish sheen on most of their head and on their upperparts, wings, and tail. Their crown sometimes appears scaly and they have some white at the base of the scapulars that is seldom visible. Their throat and underparts are pure white. Adult females' crowns are blackish with wide chestnut-brown feather tips. They have a pale line above the lores on an otherwise pale gray face. Their nape and upper back are pale gray, their lower back and rump white, and their uppertail coverts white with a buffy tinge. Their wings are blackish with wide cinnamon-brown edges on the coverts and inner flight feathers. Their tail is blackish with wide whitish to buffy tips on the outermost feathers. Their throat and underparts are white. Both sexes have a dark iris, a blackish bill, and dark legs and feet.

== Distribution and habitat ==
The glossy-backed becard's core range is mostly north of the Amazon river. In Brazil it extends from the lower Negro River east to near the Tapajos River and also extends south of the Amazon along the Urucu River. From Brazil its range sweeps northeasterly to the Atlantic in Suriname, French Guiana, and Brazil's Amapá state. There are also scattered records in Guyana, Venezuela, and further south in Brazil. The glossy-backed becard inhabits the canopy and subcanopy of humid forest and also trees in clearings and nearby savanna. In elevation it ranges from sea level to 300 m (1,000 ft).

== Behavior ==
=== Movement ===
The glossy-backed becard's movements, if any, are not known.

=== Feeding ===
The glossy-backed becard feeds mostly on insects and includes some fruit in its diet. It usually forages in pairs, though not close together, and gleans food while hopping along branches or making short flights to briefly hover.

=== Breeding ===
The glossy-backed becard's breeding season has not been fully defined but includes at least July to October in Brazil. Its nest is a bulky globe with an entrance on the side or near the bottom. It is made from dead leaves, moss, and plant fibers and is typically suspended from a branch between about 25 and 30 m (80 and 100 ft) above the ground. It is usually built near a wasp or bee nest. The clutch size, incubation period, time to fledging, and details of parental care are not known.

=== Vocalization ===
The glossy-backed becard's song is a "very high, rather sharp wuh-wheéé-wuwuweé" whose wheéé is stressed at the end; the wu can be repeated up to six times.

== Status ==
The IUCN has assessed the glossy-backed becard as being of Least Concern. Its population size is not known and is believed to be decreasing. No immediate threats have been identified. It is considered "rare and apparently local" overall and "uncommon to rare" in Brazil. It occurs in at least two protected areas in Brazil.
