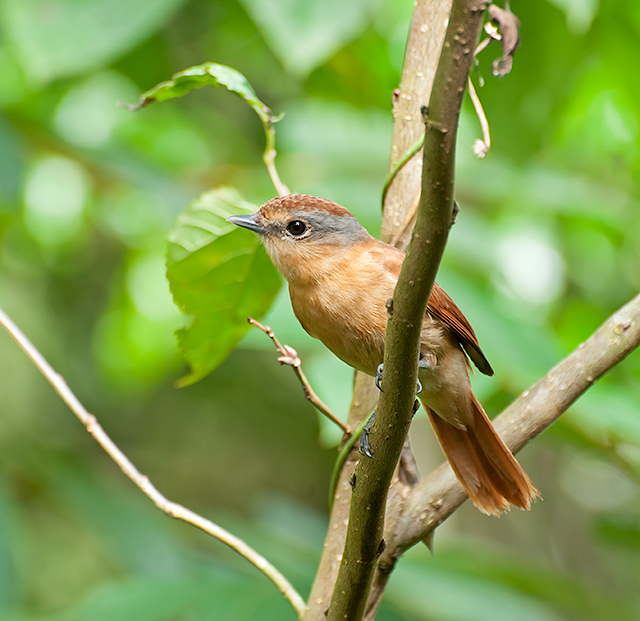
- Chestnut-crowned becard (Pachyramphus castaneus)

Scientific classification
- Kingdom: Animalia
- Phylum: Chordata
- Class: Aves
- Order: Passeriformes
- Family: Tityridae
- Subfamily: Tityrinae
- Genus: Pachyramphus; G.R. Gray, 1839

Type species
- Psaris cuvierii Swainson, 1821

Species
- See text.

Synonyms
- Bathmidura; Pachyrhamphus Strickland, 1841; Platypsaris

= Becard =

Pachyramphus

Genus of birds

A becard is a bird of the genus Pachyramphus in the family Tityridae.

== Taxonomy ==
The genus Pachyramphus was introduced in 1839 by the English zoologist George Robert Gray in the volume on birds by John Gould that formed part of Charles Darwin's Zoology of the Voyage of H.M.S. Beagle. The type species was designated by Gray in 1840 as the green-backed becard (Pachyramphus viridis). The generic name is from the Ancient Greek pakhus meaning "stout" or "thick" and rhamphos meaning "bill".

The genus had traditionally been placed in Cotingidae or Tyrannidae, but evidence strongly suggests that it is better placed in the family Tityridae, where it is now placed by the IOC.

=== Extant species ===
The genus contains seventeen species:

Image	Scientific name	Common name	Distribution
	Pachyramphus viridis	Green-backed becard	Argentina, Bolivia, Brazil, Guyana, Paraguay, Uruguay, and Venezuela.
	Pachyramphus versicolor	Barred becard	from Costa Rica to northwestern Ecuador and northern Bolivia.
	Pachyramphus spodiurus	Slaty becard	Ecuador and far northern Peru.
	Pachyramphus rufus	Cinereous becard	Brazil, Colombia, Ecuador, French Guiana, Guyana, Panama, Peru, Suriname, and Venezuela
	Pachyramphus castaneus	Chestnut-crowned becard	Brazil, Colombia, Peru, Ecuador, and Bolivia and regions of Venezuela
	Pachyramphus cinnamomeus	Cinnamon becard	south-eastern Mexico south to north-western Ecuador and north-western Venezuela
	Pachyramphus polychopterus	White-winged becard	Argentina, Belize, Bolivia, Brazil, Colombia, Costa Rica, Ecuador, French Guiana, Guatemala, Guyana, Honduras, Mexico, Nicaragua, Panama, Paraguay, Peru, Suriname, Trinidad and Tobago, Uruguay, and Venezuela.
	Pachyramphus marginatus	Black-capped becard	Bolivia, Brazil, Colombia, Ecuador, French Guiana, Guyana, Peru, Suriname, and Venezuela.
	Pachyramphus albogriseus	Black-and-white becard	Colombia, Costa Rica, Ecuador, Guatemala, Nicaragua, Panama, and Venezuela.
	Pachyramphus salvini	Cryptic becard	Ecuador and Peru.
	Pachyramphus major	Grey-collared becard	Belize, El Salvador, Guatemala, Honduras, Mexico, and Nicaragua.
	Pachyramphus surinamus	Glossy-backed becard	Brazil, French Guiana, and Suriname.
	Pachyramphus homochrous	One-colored becard	Colombia, Ecuador, Panama, Peru, and Venezuela.
	Pachyramphus minor	Pink-throated becard	Bolivia, Brazil, Colombia, Ecuador, French Guiana, Guyana, Peru, Suriname, and Venezuela.
	Pachyramphus validus	Crested becard	Argentina, Bolivia, Brazil, Ecuador, Paraguay, and Peru.
	Pachyramphus aglaiae	Rose-throated becard	south-easternmost Arizona and extreme southern Texas of the United States to western Panama.
	Pachyramphus niger	Jamaican becard	Jamaica.

=== Former species ===
Some authorities, either presently or formerly, recognize several additional species as belonging to the genus Pachyramphus including:

- Rusty-vented canastero (as Bathmidura Dorbignyi)

== Description ==
The becards are characterized by their large heads with a slight crest. The smaller members of this genus have graduated tails and most members are sexually dimorphic, although the cinnamon becard and the chestnut-crowned becard have similar plumages for the males and females. Juvenile becards resemble the adult females in plumage and, as far as known, obtain their adult plumage after about a year. The bills of the becards are grey, and many (but not all) have a black culmen or upper mandible. Their legs are dark gray.

== Distribution and habitat ==
They are primarily found in Central and South America, but the rose-throated becard occurs as far north as southern United States and, as suggested by its common name, the Jamaican becard is restricted to Jamaica. Depending on the species, they are found in wooded habitats ranging from open woodland to the dense canopy of rainforests.

== Breeding ==
The nest of a becard is a bulky globular mass of dead leaves, mosses, and fibers with the entrance near the bottom of the nest. Nests are typically wedged or slung from the outer branches of trees at the mid or upper levels.
