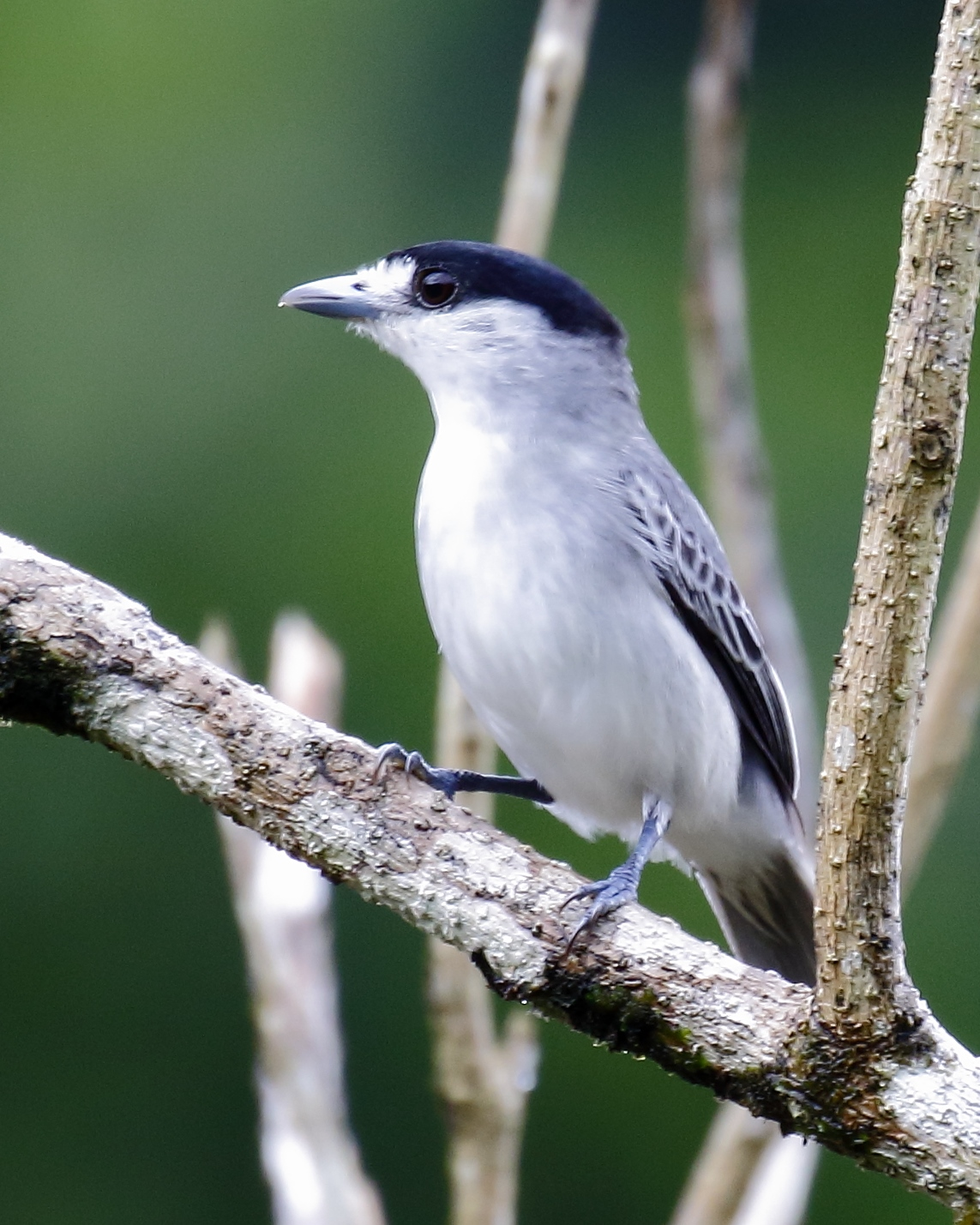
- Male at Presidente Figueiredo, Amazonas state, Brazil
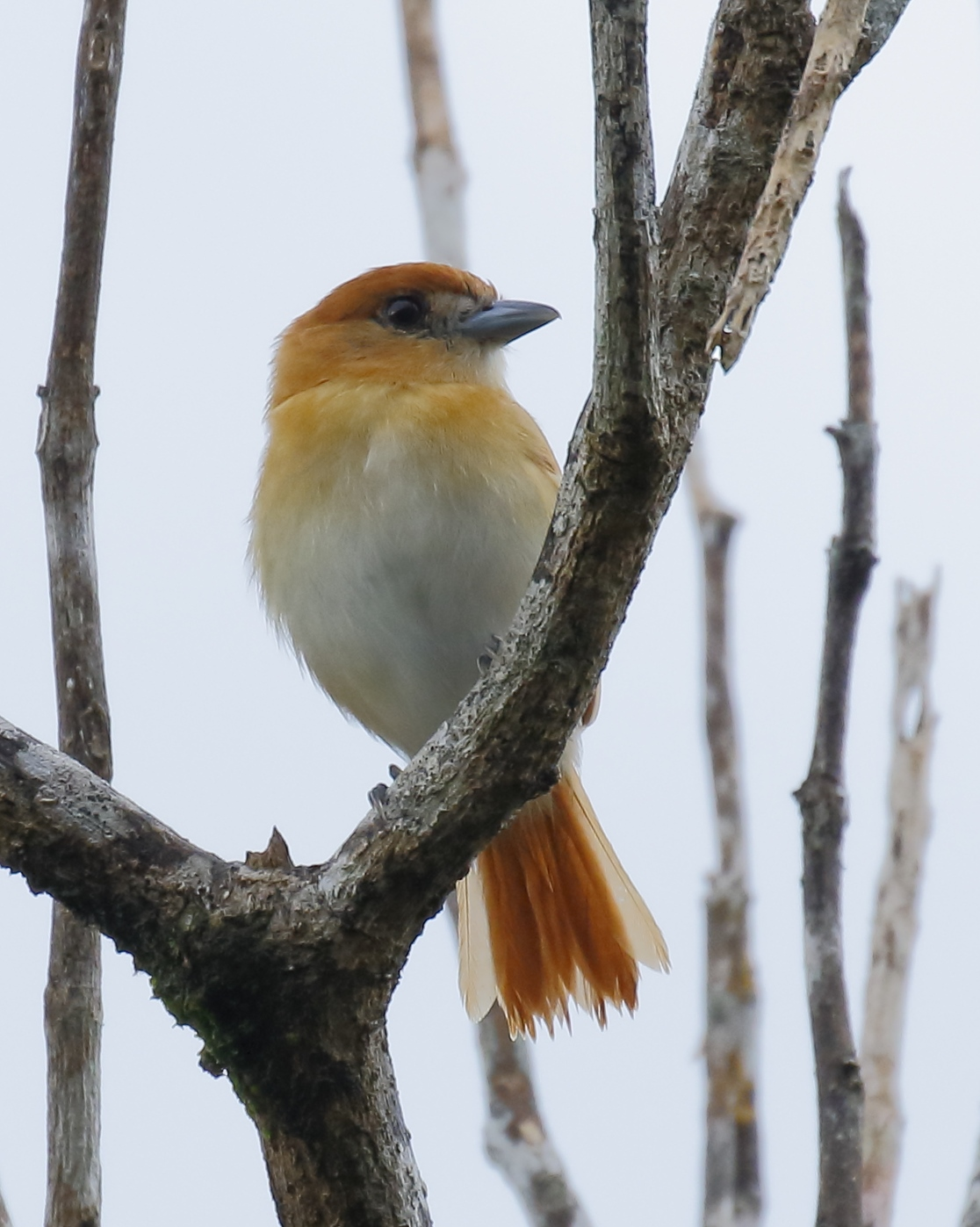
- Female at Presidente Figueiredo, Amazonas state, Brazil

Conservation status
- Least Concern (IUCN 3.1)

Scientific classification
- Kingdom: Animalia
- Phylum: Chordata
- Class: Aves
- Order: Passeriformes
- Family: Tityridae
- Genus: Pachyramphus
- Species: P. rufus

Binomial name
- Pachyramphus rufus (Boddaert, 1783)

= Cinereous becard =

Species of bird

The cinereous becard (Pachyramphus rufus) is a species of bird in the family Tityridae, the tityras, becards, and allies. It is found in Brazil, Colombia, French Guiana, Guyana, Panama, Peru, Suriname, Venezuela, and possibly Ecuador.

== Taxonomy and systematics ==
The cinereous becard was originally described by the French polymath Georges-Louis Leclerc, Comte de Buffon in 1779 in his Histoire Naturelle des Oiseaux from a specimen collected in Cayenne, French Guiana. The bird was also illustrated in a hand-colored plate engraved by François-Nicolas Martinet in the Planches Enluminées D'Histoire Naturelle, which was produced under the supervision of Edme-Louis Daubenton to accompany Buffon's text. Neither the plate caption nor Buffon's description included a scientific name but in 1783 the Dutch naturalist Pieter Boddaert coined the binomial name Muscicapa rufa in his catalogue of the Planches Enluminées. The cinereous becard is now placed in the genus Pachyramphus that was introduced in 1839 by the English zoologist George Robert Gray. The generic name is from the Ancient Greek pakhus meaning "stout" or "thick" and rhamphos meaning "bill". The specific epithet rufus is Latin for "red". The English name "cinereous" means ash-colored. Some early twentieth century authors used the specific epithet cinereus for the species.

The genus Pachyramphus has variously been assigned to the tyrant flycatcher family Tyrannidae and the cotinga family Cotingidae. Several early twenty-first century studies confirmed the placement of Pachyramphus in Tityridae and taxonomic systems made the reassignment. In 1998 the American Ornithological Society was unsure where to place the genus and listed its members as incertae sedis but in 2011 moved them to Tityridae.

Some twentieth century authors treated the cinereous becard and the slaty becard (P. spodiurus) as a single species called the "crested becard". They are sister species and form a superspecies.

The cinereous becard has two subspecies, the nominate P. r. rufous (Boddaert, 1783) and P. r. juruanus (Gyldenstolpe, 1951).

== Description ==
The cinereous becard is 12.9 to 14 cm (5.1 to 5.5 in) long and weighs about 18.5 g (0.65 oz). Adult males of the nominate subspecies have a glossy black crown, a white forehead and lores, a dusky spot in front of the eye, and pearl-gray cheeks. Their upperparts are mostly pearl-gray and sometimes have a faint olive tinge on the upper back. Their wings are blackish with thin white edges on the outer flight feathers and wider white edges on the inner flight feathers and coverts. Their tail is slaty gray; the feathers sometimes have whitish edges at their tips. Their throat is whitish and their underparts light grayish that is darkest on the upper breast. Adult females have a dark chestnut-rufous crown, whitish to whitish gray lores, and a light buffy cinnamon face. Their upperparts are bright cinnamon-rufous. Their wings' flight feathers are blackish with rufescent edges and the greater coverts are cinnamon-rufous. Their tail is cinnamon. Their throat is whitish. Their upper breast is buffy cinnamon that becomes whiter on the rest of the underparts. Males of subspecies P. r. juruanus have the black of the crown extending further back onto the nape than on the nominate; females have more cinnamon-rufous underparts than the nominate. Both sexes of both subspecies have a dark iris, a blackish bill, and grayish legs and feet.

== Distribution and habitat ==
The cinereous becard is found from southern Panama across northern South America and the Amazon Basin. The nominate subspecies is the more northerly of the two and has by far the larger range. It is found from the area of the Panama Canal across northern Colombia. Its range in Colombia extends in the west south to Valle del Cauca Department and on the eastern side of the Andes to Meta Department. From Colombia its range continues east across northern Venezuela and the Guianas to the Atlantic in Brazil's Amapá state and from there south in Brazil to Mato Grosso. Subspecies P. r. juruanus is found from Loreto Department in eastern Peru east into western Brazil's Amazonas state. The species is tentatively known in Ecuador from old specimens, and the South American Classification Committee has no confirmed records in that country.

The cinereous becard inhabits a wide variety of forest types in the tropical and lower subtropical zones. These include gallery forest, secondary forest, the edges of evergreen forest, deciduous woodlands, some scrublands, and agricultural areas and pastures with scattered trees. Coastally it also occurs in mangroves. In Panama it ranges between 750 and 1,500 m (2,500 and 4,900 ft), in Colombia from sea level to 1,500 m (4,900 ft), and in Venezuela from sea level to 1,300 m (4,300 ft).

== Behavior ==
=== Movement ===
The cinereous becard is a year-round resident.

=== Feeding ===
The cinereous becard feeds mostly on arthropods and includes small fruits and berries in its diet. It typically forages singly or in pairs and seldom joins mixed-species feeding flocks. It perches at any level in the forest and takes food by gleaning from vegetation and branches while perched and by grabbing it with an upward sally.

=== Breeding ===
The cinereous becard's breeding season has not been fully defined but includes June in Venezuela and April to October in Colombia. Its nest is a globe made from leaves and grass with a side entrance. It is typically built in a branch fork high in a tree. The clutch is two to five eggs and the female alone incubates. The incubation period is about 18 to 21 days and fledging occurs about 20 to 30 days after hatch. Other details of parental care are not known.

=== Vocalization ===
"Both sexes [of the cinereous becard] appear to have rather large repertoire of melancholy songs". They typically are "a fast series of musical notes, e.g. twee, twee, twee-twee-twee-tweetweeteeteetititi, rising in pitch and accelerating to almost a trill". Some other songs and variants are "tuweé-tuweé-tuweé-tuweé-wee", a "thin, weak trill that rises sharply, but slows and descends towards end", a shorter "twee-twee-twee-tweedo", and a "slightly hoarse we’p-pe-pe-pe-pe-pe-pe-pé-wé-o". Its calls include a "high-pitched and metallic-sounding eeeeé that rises slightly at end" and a "buzzy breez-det".

== Status ==
The IUCN has assessed the cinereous becard as being of Least Concern. It has an extremely large range; its estimated population of at least 500,000 mature individuals is believed to be decreasing. No immediate threats have been identified. It is considered common in Colombia, "uncommon to fairly common locally" in Venezuela, rare in Peru, "frequent to uncommon" in Brazil, and "uncertain" in Ecuador. It occurs in one national park in Panama and at least three protected areas in Brazil.
