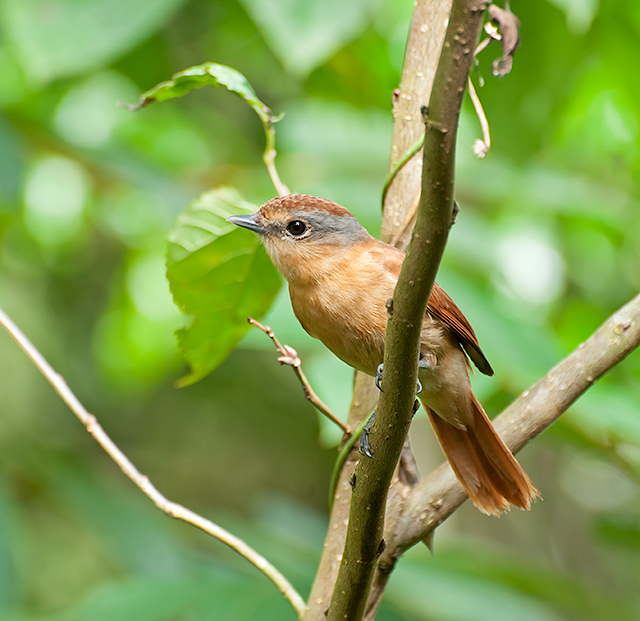

Conservation status
- Least Concern (IUCN 3.1)

Scientific classification
- Kingdom: Animalia
- Phylum: Chordata
- Class: Aves
- Order: Passeriformes
- Family: Tityridae
- Genus: Pachyramphus
- Species: P. castaneus

Binomial name
- Pachyramphus castaneus (Jardine & Selby, 1827)

= Chestnut-crowned becard =

Species of bird

The chestnut-crowned becard (Pachyramphus castaneus) is a species of bird in the family Tityridae, the tityras, becards, and allies. It is found in Argentina, Bolivia, Brazil, Colombia, Ecuador, Peru, Paraguay, and Venezuela.

== Taxonomy and systematics ==
The chestnut-crowned becard was originally described in 1827 as Tityra castenea. It was eventually reassigned to genus Pachyramphus that the English zoologist George Robert Gray erected in 1839.

The genus Pachyramphus has variously been assigned to the tyrant flycatcher family Tyrannidae and the cotinga family Cotingidae. Several early twenty-first century studies confirmed the placement of Pachyramphus in Tityridae and taxonomic systems made the reassignment. In 1998 the American Ornithological Society was unsure where to place the genus and listed its members as incertae sedis but in 2011 moved them to Tityridae.

The chestnut-crowned becard and the cinnamon becard (P. cinnamomeus) are sister species and form a superspecies.

The chestnut-crowned becard has these five subspecies:

- P. c. saturatus Chapman, 1914
- P. c. intermedius Berlepsch, 1879
- P. c. parui Phelps, WH & Phelps, WH Jr, 1949
- P. c. amazonus Zimmer, JT, 1936
- P. c. castaneus (Jardine & Selby, 1827)

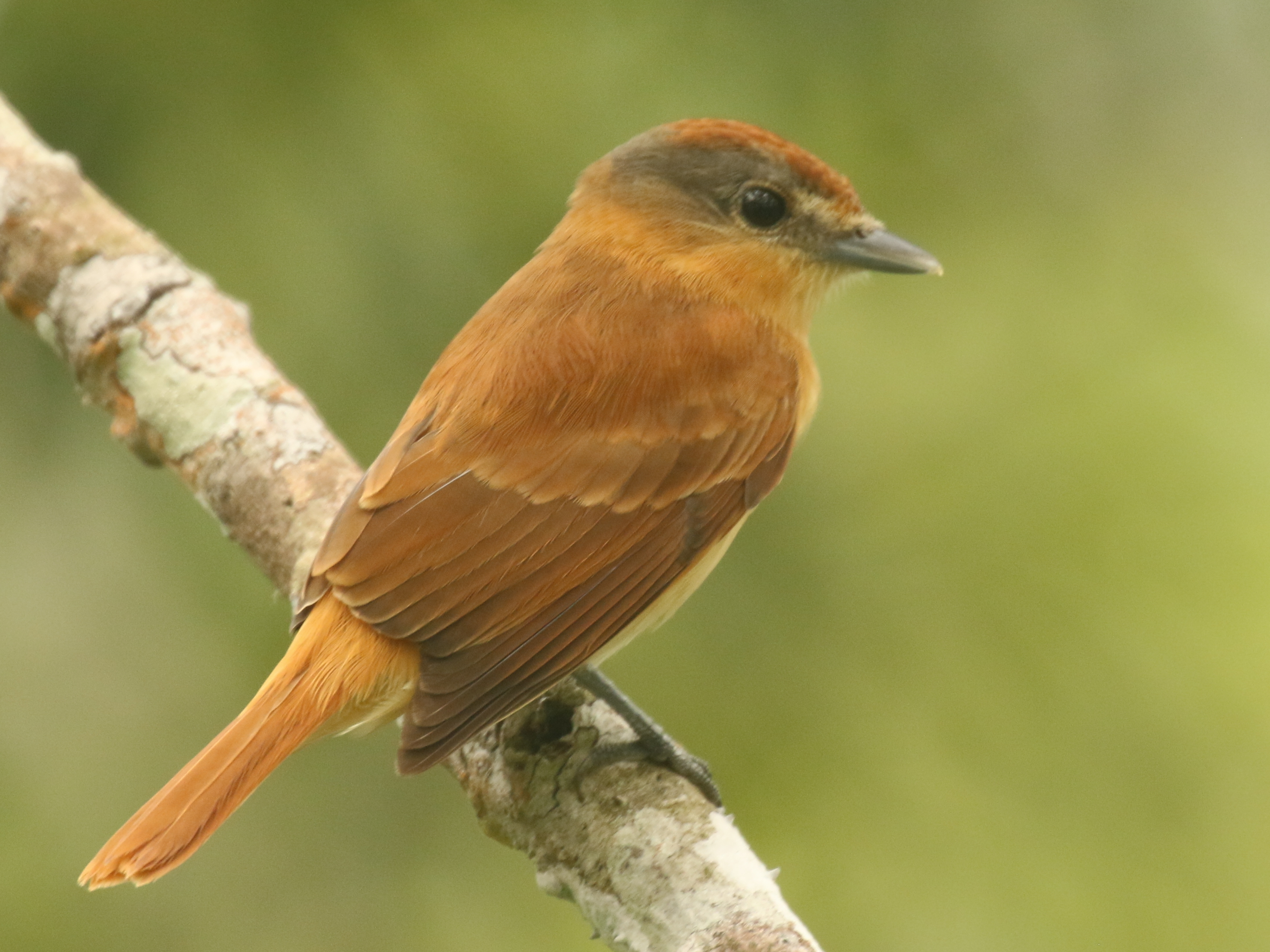
Yasuni National Park, Ecuador

== Description ==
The chestnut-crowned becard is about 14 to 15 cm (5.5 to 5.9 in) long and weighs about 17 g (0.60 oz). The sexes have the same plumage. Adults of the nominate subspecies P. c. castaneus have a dark chestnut-rufous crown with a scaly appearance, dusky lores, a pale buff-whitish line above the lores, a gray line above the eye that widens and extends around the nape, and pale cinnamon cheeks. Their upperparts are mostly cinnamon-rufous. Their wings are mostly dusky cinnamon with dusky rufous coverts and dusky flight feathers with light cinnamon-rufous edges. Their tail is cinnamon-rufous. Their underparts are pale cinnamon-buff that is paler on the throat.

Subspecies P. c. saturatus has darker and more chestnut upperparts and a slightly grayer and less scaly crown than the nominate. P. c. intermedius and P. c. amazonus have slightly paler upperparts and tail than the nominate. P. c. parui is darker overall than the nominate with a more dusky chestnut crown. All subspecies have a dark iris, a blackish bill, and dusky legs and feet.

== Distribution and habitat ==
The chestnut-crowned becard has a disjunct distribution. The subspecies are found thus:

- P. c. saturatus: from southeastern Colombia south through eastern Ecuador and eastern Peru into northern Bolivia; east from there in western Brazil to the Manaus region and the Purus River; isolated population in Venezuela's southeastern Bolívar state
- P. c. intermedius: northern Venezuela from the north end of the Andes in Lara and east through Falcón, and Yaracuy, and the Coast Ranges in Anzoátegui, Sucre, and Monagas
- P. c. parui: Cerro Parú in southern Venezuela's Amazonas state
- P. c. amazonus: Brazil along the Amazon from eastern Amazonas east to the Tocantins River and Maranhão state
- P. c. castaneus: eastern and southeastern Brazil south of a line roughly from Mato Grosso do Sul northeast to northern Bahia and from there south to northern Rio Grande do Sul and into southeastern Paraguay and far northeastern Argentina's Misiones Province

In the Amazon Basin the chestnut-crowned becard inhabits humid terra firme and várzea lowland forest, where it favors the edges and clearings with tall trees. There it also inhabits riparian forest, secondary woodland, and coffee plantations. Its northern Venezuelan and southeastern populations inhabit a similar mix of forest types though some are drier than those of the Amazon Basin. In elevation it ranges from sea level to 1,000 m (3,300 ft) and locally higher in Brazil. It reaches 500 m (1,600 ft) in Colombia, locally 1,000 m (3,300 ft) in Ecuador, locally 800 m (2,600 ft) in Peru, and 1,700 m (5,600 ft) in Venezuela.

== Behavior ==
=== Movement ===
The chestnut-crowned becard is a year-round resident.

=== Feeding ===
The chestnut-crowned becard feeds on large insects including caterpillars and occasionally includes berries in its diet. It typically forages in pairs though sometimes singly, and usually does not join mixed-species feeding flocks. It forages mostly in the forest's upper levels, where it gleans food while perched and with short sallies from the perch and sometimes while briefly hovering.

=== Breeding ===
The chestnut-crowned becard's breeding season has not been established but includes May in Colombia, March and July in Ecuador, and October and February in Argentina. Its nest is a messy globe with a downward-facing entrance hole at the bottom and made from grass and plant fibers. It is usually wedged in a branch fork at a level from the forest's mid-story to its canopy. The clutch size, incubation period, time to fledging, and details of parental care are not known.

=== Vocalization ===
The chestnut-crowned becard's song is a "simple series of 4-5 very high weeu--- notes without intervals". It is also described as "a series of soft, thin, casual, rather musical whistles, e.g. teeeuw-teeu-teeu or teeeer, tee, tee". Its call is "extr. high, slightly gliding up and down tuuit notes".

== Status ==
The IUCN has assessed the chestnut-crowned becard as being of Least Concern. It has an extremely large range; its population size is not known and is believed to be decreasing. No immediate threats have been identified. It is considered "fairly common" in Colombia and Ecuador, "uncommon but widespread" in Peru, "fairly common to locally common" in Venezuela, and "frequent to uncommon" in Brazil. It occurs in many protected areas both public and private throughout its range.
