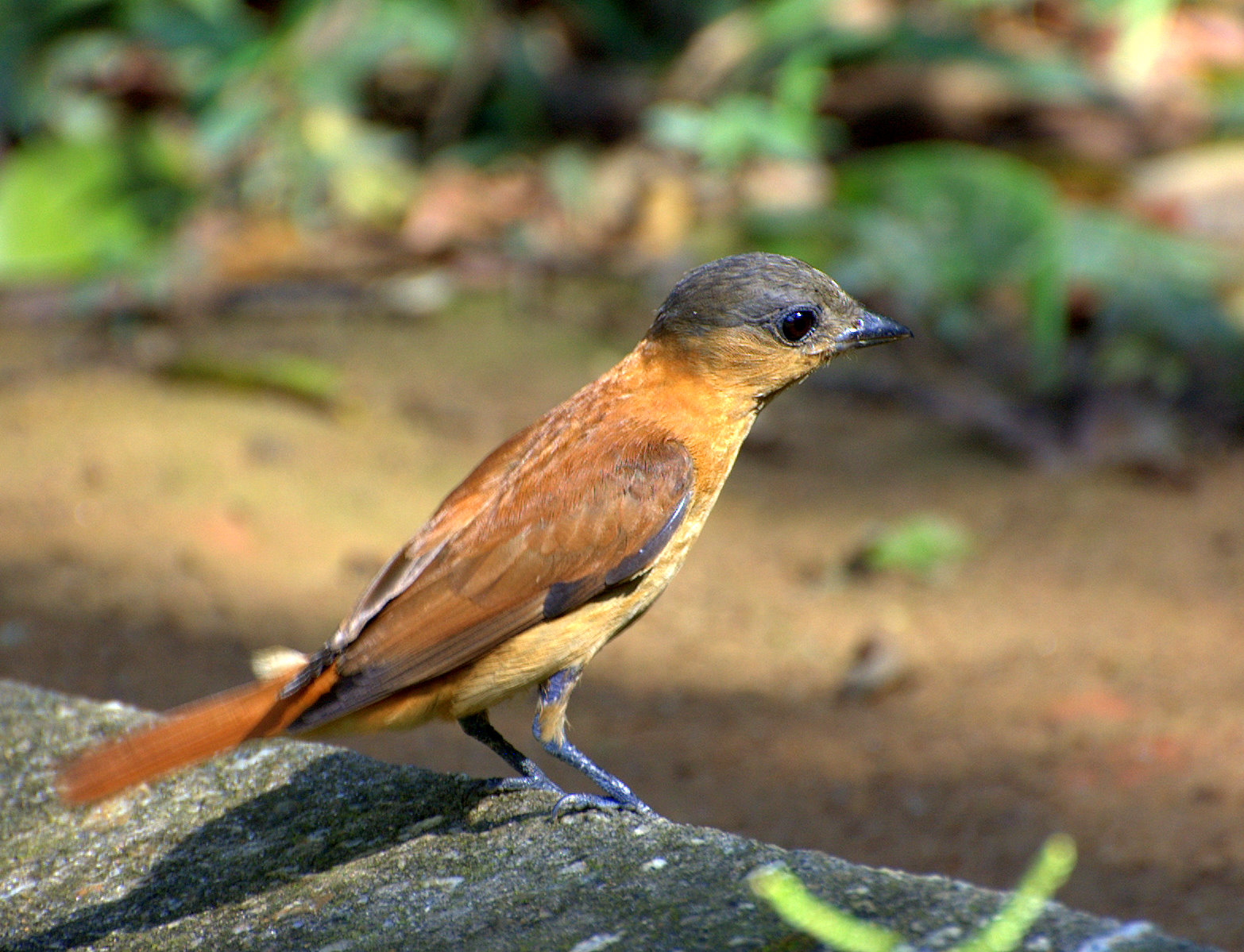
- Female

Conservation status
- Least Concern (IUCN 3.1)

Scientific classification
- Kingdom: Animalia
- Phylum: Chordata
- Class: Aves
- Order: Passeriformes
- Family: Tityridae
- Genus: Pachyramphus
- Species: P. validus

Binomial name
- Pachyramphus validus (Lichtenstein, MHC, 1823)

Synonyms
- Lanius validus; Platypsaris rufus; Hylonax rufus; Platypsaris validus

= Crested becard =

Species of bird

The crested becard (Pachyramphus validus), also known as the plain becard, is a species of bird in the family Tityridae, the tityras, becards, and allies. It is found in Argentina, Bolivia, Brazil, Paraguay, Peru, and possibly Ecuador.

== Taxonomy and systematics ==
The crested becard was originally described in 1831 as Lanius validus, mistakenly placing it in the shrike family. It was later briefly placed in its own genus Hylonax and then in genus Platypsaris. The latter was merged by most taxonomists into Pachyramphus in 1973. It is now one of 18 becards in genus Pachyramphus that had been introduced in 1839 by George Gray. The genus Pachyramphus has variously been assigned to the tyrant flycatcher family Tyrannidae and the cotinga family Cotingidae. Several early twenty-first century studies confirmed the placement of Pachyramphus in Tityridae and taxonomic systems made the reassignment.

The crested becard has two subspecies, the nominate P. v. validus (Lichtenstein, MHC, 1823) and P. v. audax (Cabanis, 1873).

== Description ==
The crested becard is 17 to 18.5 cm (6.7 to 7.3 in) long. The species is sexually dimorphic. Though its crown is somewhat shaggy it does not have an obvious raised crest. Adult males of the nominate subspecies have a mostly dark grayish to almost black crown, upperparts, wings, and tail with a partially hidden white patch on the back and some white on the scapulars. They have a smoky gray spot above the lores on an otherwise grayish face. Their throat is whitish gray and their underparts pale smoky grayish with a cinnamon tinge. Adult females have a dark grayish brown crown and a bright rufous nape. They have a buff-grayish spot above the lores on an otherwise cinnamon face. Their upperparts and tail are bright rufous. Their wings are mostly dusky with thin rufous edges on the primaries and fully rufous inner flight feathers. Their throat is yellowish cinnamon and their underparts dull buffy cinnamon. Males of subspecies P. v. audax have little or no cinnamon tinge on their underparts and a more grayish white throat and darker wings than the nominate. Females have a more sooty crown, darker wings with duskier inner flight feathers, and darker underparts than the nominate. Both sexes of both subspecies have a dark brown iris, a black maxilla, a medium gray mandible, and dark gray legs and feet.

== Distribution and habitat ==
Subspecies P. v. audax of the crested becard is the more westerly of the two. It is found in the southern Peruvian departments of Junín, Ayacucho, and Cuzco. Its range continues through northwestern, central, and southern Bolivia and south into northwestern Argentina as far as Córdoba Province. The nominate is found in Brazil south and east of a rough line Rondônia - Tocantins - northeastern Pará. Its range continues south in Brazil to northern Rio Grande do Sul and across eastern Bolivia and Paraguay into northeastern Argentina to Santa Fe Province. The nominate also reaches extreme southeastern Peru as a rare austral migrant. There is a single unconfirmed record in extreme southern Ecuador that is tentatively assigned to P. v. audax. The South American Classification Committee does not recognize the record.

The crested becard inhabits semi-arid to semi-humid woodlands and montane forest. It favors the forest canopy and edges, and also wet ravines. In elevation it ranges from sea level to 2,000 m (6,600 ft) in Brazil and between 1,700 and 3,400 m (5,600 and 11,200 ft) in Peru.

== Behavior ==
=== Movement ===
The crested becard is generally a year-round resident. However, it is a rare visitor to far southeastern Peru in the austral winter.

=== Feeding ===
The crested becard feeds mostly on large insects. It usually forages singly and occasionally joins mixed-species feeding flocks.

=== Breeding ===
The crested becard's breeding season has not been defined but includes November to January in Argentina. Its nest is a bulky globe with an entrance on the side or near the bottom. It is made from dead leaves and plant fibers and usually hangs from the end of a branch. The clutch is four eggs. The incubation period, time to fledging, and details of parental care are not known.

=== Vocalization ===
The crested becard is not highly vocal. It sometimes makes an "unstructured series of extr./very high, sharp rolling and strident see notes". Its song has also been described as "a low, clear, vibrating, descending series of 6–8 dui whistles" and its call "a shrill tsree whistle".

== Status ==
The IUCN has assessed the crested becard as being of Least Concern. It has a very large range; its population size is not known and is believed to be decreasing. No immediate threats have been identified. It is overall considered uncommon to fairly common though "frequent to uncommon" in Brazil and rare in Peru. It is found in many protected areas both public and private.
