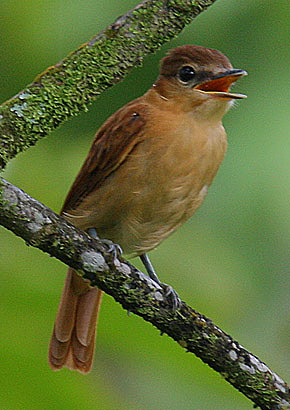
- On the slopes of the Arenal Volcano, Costa Rica

Conservation status
- Least Concern (IUCN 3.1)

Scientific classification
- Kingdom: Animalia
- Phylum: Chordata
- Class: Aves
- Order: Passeriformes
- Family: Tityridae
- Genus: Pachyramphus
- Species: P. cinnamomeus

Binomial name
- Pachyramphus cinnamomeus Lawrence, 1861

= Cinnamon becard =

Species of bird

The cinnamon becard (Pachyramphus cinnamomeus) is a passerine bird in the family Tityridae, the tityras, becards, and allies. It is found in Mexico, in every Central American country except El Salvador, and in Colombia, Ecuador, and Venezuela.

== Taxonomy and systematics ==
The genus Pachyramphus has variously been assigned to the tyrant flycatcher family Tyrannidae and the cotinga family Cotingidae. Several early twenty-first century studies confirmed the placement of Pachyramphus in Tityridae and taxonomic systems made the reassignment. In 1998 the American Ornithological Society was unsure where to place the genus and listed its members as incertae sedis but in 2011 moved them to Tityridae. In 1998 the American Ornithological Society was unsure where to place the genus and listed its members as incertae sedis but in 2011 moved them to Tityridae.

The cinnamon becard and the chestnut-crowned becard (P. castaneus) are sister species and form a superspecies.

The cinnamon becard has these four subspecies:

- P. c. fulvidior Griscom, 1932
- P. c. cinnamomeus Lawrence, 1861
- P. c. magdalenae Chapman, 1914
- P. c. badius Phelps, WH & Phelps, WH Jr, 1955

== Description ==
The cinnamon becard is 14 to 15 cm (5.5 to 5.9 in) long and weighs 17 to 22 g (0.60 to 0.78 oz). The sexes have the same plumage. Adults of the nominate subspecies P. c. cinnamomeus have a deep rufous crown, dusky lores, a pale buff line above the lores, and ochraceous tawny cheeks. Their upperparts are mostly rufous or chestnut-rufous to rufous-tawny. Their wings are rufous that is darker and duskier on the primary coverts. Their tail is rufous. Their underparts are ochraceous tawny to cinnamon-buff or to tawny-buff that is paler on the throat and belly and has a rufous tinge across the breast. Subspecies P. c. fulvidior is more richly colored than the nominate. P. c. magdalenae has underparts that are more whitish than the nominate's and with a cinnamon wash. P. c. badius is similar to magdaleneae but slightly darker. All subspecies have a dark iris, a blackish bill with often a paler grayish mandible, and dark gray legs and feet.

== Distribution and habitat ==
The subspecies of the cinnamon becard are found thus:

- P. c. fulvidior: from southeastern Veracruz and northeastern Oaxaca in southeastern Mexico south through central and southern Belize, northern Guatemala, and the Caribbean slopes of Honduras, Nicaragua, and Costa Rica into western Panama; on the Pacific slope from Costa Rica's Puntarenas Province south into western Panama
- P. c. cinnamomeus: from Darién Province in eastern Panama south into northwestern Colombia; south in Colombia's Eastern Andes regularly to Meta Department and at least occasionally further south; south through western Colombia and through western Ecuador almost to Peru.
- P. c. magdalenae: northern Colombia's Magdalena River valley and from northern Sucre Department east into western Venezuela's Zulia, Táchira, and Mérida states
- P. c. badius: western Venezuela on the east slope of the Andes in Táchira

The cinnamon becard inhabits the interior and edges of evergreen forest and secondary forest in the tropical and lower subtropical zones. It also occurs in somewhat open woodlands, riparian areas, clearings with tall trees, and coastally in mangroves. In elevation it ranges overall from sea level mostly to 1,200 m (3,900 ft). It reaches 500 m (1,600 ft) in northern Central America, 900 m (3,000 ft) in Costa Rica, 1,300 m (4,300 ft) in Colombia, 800 m (2,600 ft) in Ecuador, and 1,200 m (3,900 ft) in Venezuela.

== Behavior ==
=== Movement ===
The cinnamon becard is mostly a year-round resident. However, it appears to make some seasonal movements in Mexico.

=== Feeding ===
The cinnamon becard feeds on a variety of insects, other arthropods, and berries. It usually forages singly or in pairs though sometimes in small groups; it occasionally joins mixed-species feeding flocks. It perches from the forest's mid-story to its canopy and takes its food by gleaning from vegetation and twigs with a short sally from the perch.

=== Breeding ===
The cinnamon becard's breeding season has not been fully defined but includes March to July in Costa Rica and perhaps as long as January to October in Colombia, Its nest is a bulky globe that usually has a side entrance and is made from dead leaves, plant fibers, moss, rootlets, and other plant material. It typically is wedged in a branch fork high in the canopy but nests have been noted between 1.5 and 15 m (5 and 50 ft) above the ground. Nests are often placed near an active wasp nest. The clutch is three or four eggs; the female alone incubates for about 18 to 21 days. Both parents provision nestlings and fledging occurs about 20 to 30 days after hatch.

=== Vocalization ===
A typical cinnamon becard song is "a somewhat plaintive, reedy, usually fast or nearly trilled series of musical notes, e.g. teedeedee-deedeedee, cheei dee-dee, deeeuu dew dew, dew, dew". Other descriptions include "a high-pitched, thin, whistled tseeeuuuu-tu-tu-tu-tu-tu-tu" and "a sweet, mellow tee, deer-dear-dear-dear, falling in pitch and trailing off at [the] end". Its calls include "reedy, but shorter swee-dwee-dwee or seer eeer eeur series [and a] variety of high-pitched, thin and more plaintive seeeeiu slurred whistle-like calls".

== Status ==
The IUCN has assessed the cinnamon becard as being of Least Concern. It has a large range; its estimated population of at least 50,000 mature individuals is believed to be decreasing. No immediate threats have been identified. It is considered "rare to uncommon" in northern Central America, "common" on the Caribbean slope of Costa Rica and "very uncommon" on the Pacific slope, "fairly common" in Colombia, and "common" in Ecuador.
