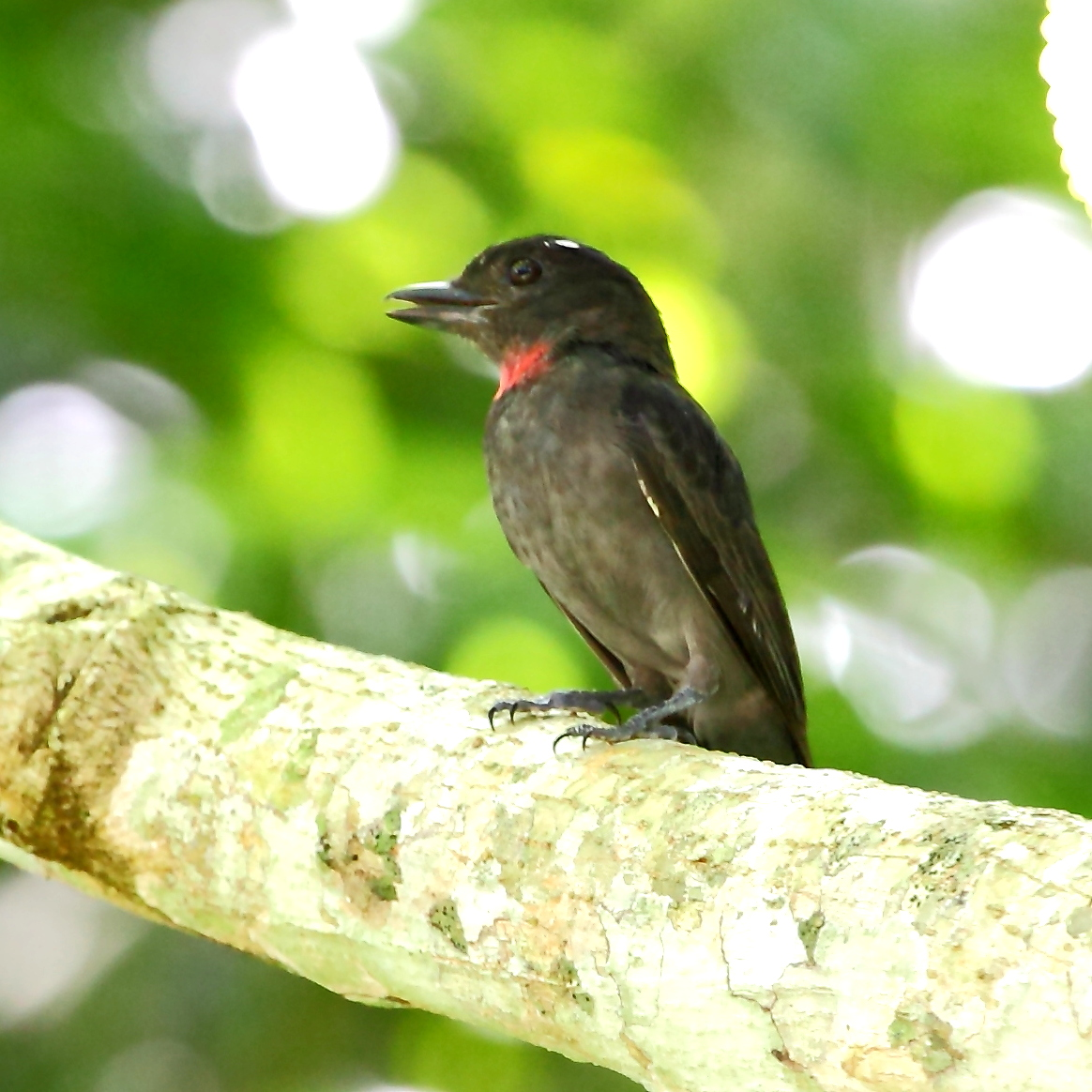
- Male at Apiacás, Mato Grosso state, Brazil

Conservation status
- Least Concern (IUCN 3.1)

Scientific classification
- Kingdom: Animalia
- Phylum: Chordata
- Class: Aves
- Order: Passeriformes
- Family: Tityridae
- Genus: Pachyramphus
- Species: P. minor

Binomial name
- Pachyramphus minor (Lesson, 1831)

Synonyms
- Querula minor (protonym); Platypsaris minor

= Pink-throated becard =

Species of bird

The pink-throated becard (Pachyramphus minor) is a species of bird in the family Tityridae, the tityras, becards, and allies. It is found in every mainland South American country except Argentina, Chile, Paraguay, and Uruguay.

== Taxonomy and systematics ==
The pink-throated becard was originally described in 1831 as Querula minor. For a time it and several other becards were placed in genus Platypsaris which was merged by most taxonomists into Pachyramphus in 1973. It is now one of 18 becards in genus Pachyramphus that had been introduced in 1839 by George Gray. The genus Pachyramphus has variously been assigned to the tyrant flycatcher family Tyrannidae and the cotinga family Cotingidae. Several early twenty-first century studies confirmed the placement of Pachyramphus in Tityridae and taxonomic systems made the reassignment.

The pink-throated becard is monotypic.

== Description ==
The pink-throated becard is 16.5 to 17.5 cm (6.5 to 6.9 in) long and weighs 31 to 44 g (1.1 to 1.6 oz). The species is sexually dimorphic. Adult males are mostly black to dark sooty gray. Their face and underparts are slightly paler than their back. They have the eponymous pink patch on the lower throat and upper breast, though sometimes it is indistinct. They have some white at the bend of the wing that is usually visible only in flight. Adult females have somewhat individually variable plumage. In general they have a grayish brown crown and nape. They have a small buff spot above the lores on an otherwise buff face. Their back is gray, their rump gray with a rufous tinge, and their wings and tail rufous. Their throat and underparts are buff. Both sexes have a brown to dark brown iris, a bill that can be all black or have a black maxilla and a gray mandible, and blackish to gray legs and feet.

== Distribution and habitat ==
The pink-throated becard is a bird of the Amazon Basin and the Guiana Shield. It is found from southeastern Colombia south through eastern Ecuador and eastern Peru into northern Bolivia. From there its range extends east across southern and eastern Venezuela, the Guianas, and Brazil north of a line roughly from southern Mato Grosso do Sul northeast to the Atlantic in Maranhão. It inhabits a variety of forested landscapes, especially evergreen terra firme. It also is found in várzea, swamp, and savanna forests. In elevation it ranges from sea level to 800 m (2,600 ft) in Brazil. It reaches 500 m (1,600 ft) in Colombia, 600 m (2,000 ft) in Ecuador, 1,000 m (3,300 ft) in Peru, 1,300 m (4,300 ft) in Bolivia, and 800 m (2,600 ft) in Venezuela.

== Behavior ==
=== Movement ===
The pink-throated becard is a year-round resident.

=== Feeding ===
The pink-throated becard is believed to feed mostly on insects and also include fruits in its diet. It usually forages in pairs though sometimes in small family groups and regularly joins mixed-species feeding flocks. It forages from the forest's mid-story to its canopy, taking food from foliage with sallies from a perch that may include a short hover.

=== Breeding ===
The pink-throated becard's breeding season has not been defined. However, nest-building, nests with eggs, and other signs of breeding have been observed in almost every month in some part of its range. Its nest is a large ball with a side entrance, made from leaves and moss, and usually sited high in a tree. Two clutches were each of three eggs; they were off-white with brownish speckles. The incubation period, time to fledging, and details of parental care are not known.

=== Vocalization ===
The pink-throated becard is generally quiet. Its song is described as "a clear, melodic teeuuuweeet often followed by twittering notes", "a thin, wiry, high, rising-falling, whiny tewwweeewww or a rising tueeeet?", and " a clear, rising whistle, tuuueeeE". Its calls include "a rapid chatter of squeaky whistles and whines and a sharp ik".

== Status ==
The IUCN has assessed the pink-throated becard as being of Least Concern. It has a very large range; its population size is not known and is believed to be decreasing. No immediate threats have been identified. It is considered "fairly common" in Colombia, "scarce" in Ecuador, "uncommon" in Peru and Venezuela, and "frequent to uncommon" in Brazil. "As is the case for most birds that inhabit forest, [the] Pink-throated Becard is vulnerable to habitat loss or degradation. Otherwise, human activity has little short term direct effect on this species."
