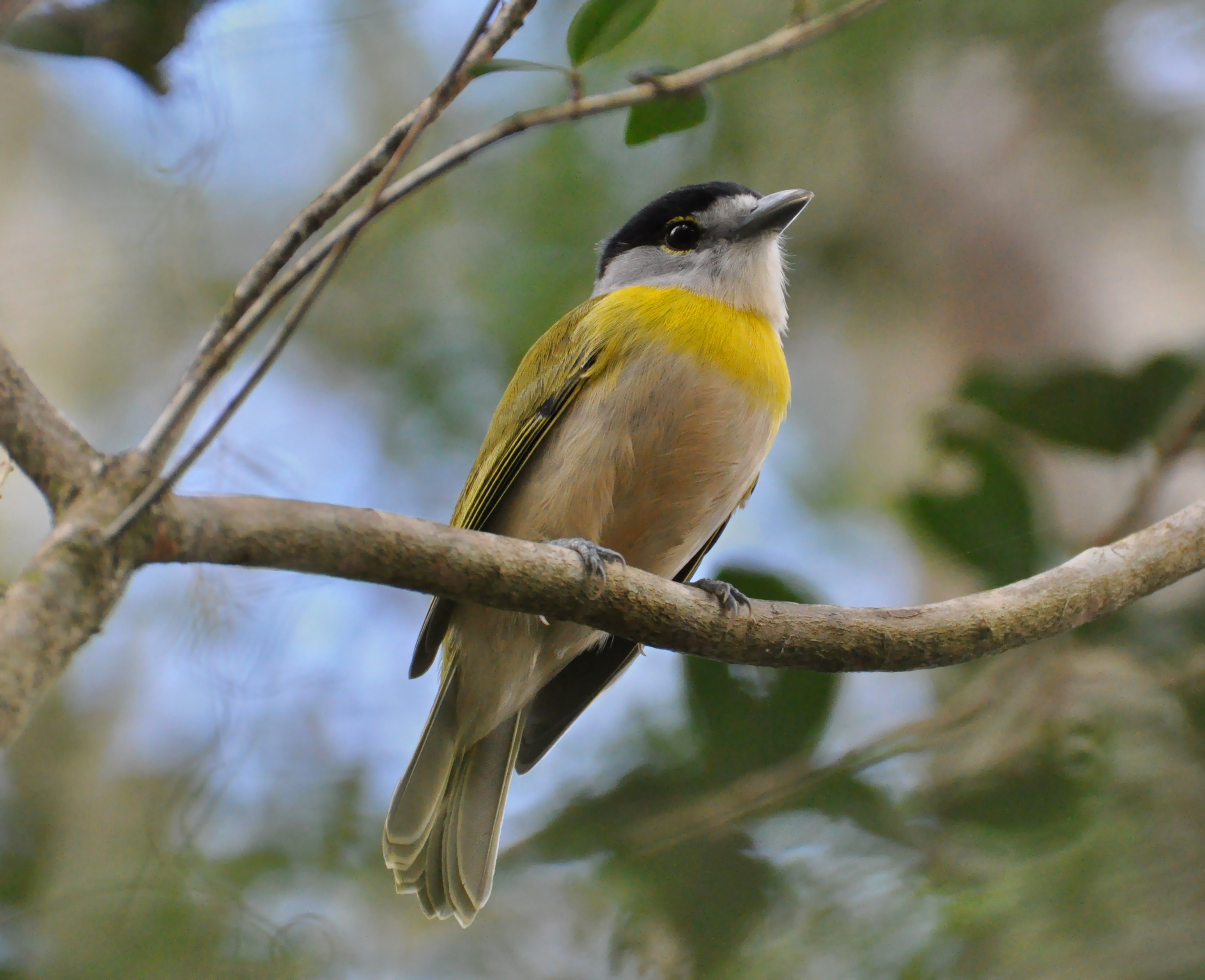
- Male

Conservation status
- Least Concern (IUCN 3.1)

- Least Concern (IUCN 3.1)

Scientific classification
- Kingdom: Animalia
- Phylum: Chordata
- Class: Aves
- Order: Passeriformes
- Family: Tityridae
- Genus: Pachyramphus
- Species: P. viridis

Binomial name
- Pachyramphus viridis (Vieillot, 1816)
- Range

= Green-backed becard =

Species of bird

The green-backed becard (Pachyramphus viridis) is a species of passerine bird in the family Tityridae, the tityras, becards, and allies. It is found in Argentina, Bolivia, Brazil, Guyana, Paraguay, Uruguay, and Venezuela. The green-backed becard includes the yellow-cheeked becard as a subspecies.

== Taxonomy ==
The green-backed becard was formally described in 1816 by the French ornithologist Louis Vieillot under the binomial name Tityra viridis. He based his account on the "Caracterizados verde y corona negra" from Paraguay that had been described in 1805 by the Spanish naturalist Félix de Azara in his Apuntamientos para la historia natural de los páxaros del Paragüay y Rio de la Plata. The specific epithet viridis is Latin meaning "green". The green-backed becard is now one of 17 species placed in the genus Pachyramphus that was introduced in 1839 by the English zoologist George Robert Gray.

The genus has variously been assigned to the tyrant flycatcher family Tyrannidae, and the cotinga family Cotingidae. Several early twenty-first century studies confirmed the placement of Pachyramphus in Tityridae and taxonomic systems made the reassignment.

Four subspecies are recognised:

- P. v. griseigularis Salvin, O & Godman, FD, 1883 – southeastern Venezuela (eastern Bolívar) and lower Amazonian Brazil
- P. v. viridis (Vieillot, LJP, 1816) – eastern Bolivia to northern Argentina, eastern Uruguay, Paraguay, and eastern Brazil
- P. v. xanthogenys Salvadori, AT & Festa, E, 1898 – east slope of Andes of eastern Ecuador (south to Zamora-Chinchipe)
- P. v. peruanus Hartert, EJO & Goodson, A, 1917 – east slope of Andes of central Peru (Huánuco and Junín)

The taxa P. v. xanthogenys and P. v. peruanus have sometimes been treated as a separate species, the yellow-cheeked becard. In 2025 AviList lumped the yellow-cheeked becard with the green-backed becard based on the small genetic differences, the similar vocalization and the modest differences in plumage.

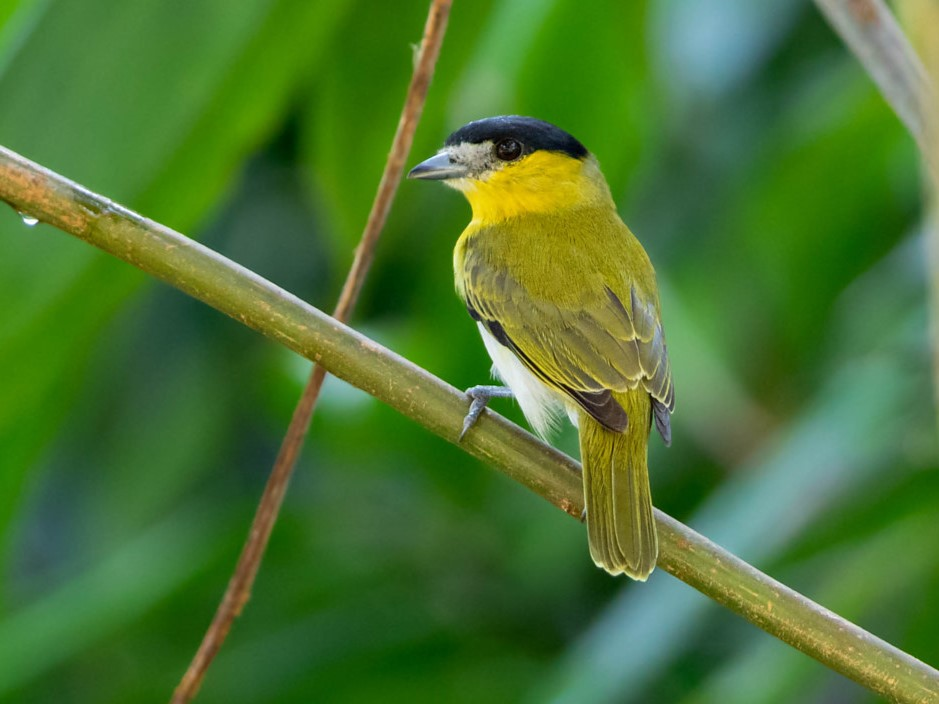
Subspecies Pachyramphus xanthogenys, the yellow-cheeked becard, in Rio Branco, Acre, Brazil

== Description ==
The green-backed becard is about 14.5 to 16 cm (5.7 to 6.3 in) long; two individuals of the nominate subspecies weighed 18 and 21 g (0.63 and 0.74 oz). Adult males of the nominate subspecies have a glossy black crown, whitish lores, and a thin yellowish eye-ring. The lower part of their face and their nape are pale gray. Their upperparts are mostly bright olive with dusky olive flight feathers and tail. Their throat is whitish, their breast bright yellow to olive yellow, and the rest of their underparts grayish white with a buffy tinge. Adult females have a similar pattern to males. However, their crown is dull olive, their lores grayish, and their face grayer. Their upperparts are pale olive and their wing coverts rufous-chestnut. Their breast is a more muted yellow and their underparts overall somewhat more dusky than the male's. The male of subspecies P. v. griseigularis has a grayish olive face and nape. It has blackish flight feathers with olive edges. The underparts are mostly grayish white with grayer sides and flanks than the nominate's. The male of the subspecies P. v. xanthogenys has bright yellow cheeks, sides of neck and throat. The male of subspecies peruanus is very simililar to xanthogenys but has a slightly brighter yellow face and breast. Both sexes have a dark iris, a pale bluish horn bill, and dusky or grayish legs and feet.

== Distribution and habitat ==
The green-backed becard has a disjunct distribution. The nominate subspecies has by far the larger range. It is found in eastern and southern Brazil south from a line roughly southwest from Ceará and Rio Grande do Norte to west-central Mato Grosso. It is a year-round resident from Mato Grosso slightly into eastern Bolivia. It continues south through most of Paraguay into northeastern Argentina as far as Santa Fe and Entre Ríos provinces and northern Uruguay, and loops north from Argentina into central Bolivia. Subspecies P. v. griseigularis is found in the eastern part of the eastern Venezuelan states of Delta Amacuro and Bolívar and slightly east into western Guyana and also in Brazil along the lower Amazon River from the lower Tapajós River to its mouth. Subspecies P. v. xanthogenys is along the eastern base of the Andes in Ecuador and northern Peru.

The green-backed becard primarily inhabits humid to moist forest in the tropical and lower montane zones, and favors broken and somewhat open areas. It also is found in riparian forest, terra firme forest, and the ecotone between them. In Brazil it is found from sea level to 1,000 m (3,280 ft). It also reaches that elevation in Venezuela.

== Behavior ==
=== Feeding ===
The green-backed becard's diet has not been studied but is believed to be mostly insects with some fruit. It has been observed in pairs accompanying mixed-species feeding flocks. It forages in any level of the forest, typically taking food by reaching from a perch, snatching it after a short flight, or while briefly hovering.

=== Breeding ===
The green-backed becard's breeding season has not been fully defined but includes October to December in Argentina, October in Paraguay, and September to December in Brazil. Its nest is a messy globe made from dead leaves, plant fibers, and moss and is typically wedged in a branch fork. Nests have been found between about 4 and 25 m (15 and 80 ft) above the ground. The clutch is two to four eggs that are ochre or brownish gray with brown markings. The female alone incubates, for about 18 to 21 days. Fledging occurs about 20 to 30 days after hatch and both parents provision the nestlings.

=== Vocalization ===
The green-backed becard's song is starts abruptly and then is an "ascending and slightly decelerating series of 10-15 dee-dee--- notes or series of ascending jeh-weeé-- (6-20x)". Its usual call is "a fast, thin and nasal q-wink, q-wink that rises in pitch, and may be repeated up to 12 times".

== Conservation status ==
The IUCN follows HBW taxonomy and so has separately assessed the green-backed sensu stricto and green-cheeked becards. Both are assessed as being of Least Concern. Together they have a very large range. Neither taxon's population size is known and both are believed to be decreasing. No immediate threats to either have been identified. The species is considered "frequent to uncommon" in Brazil and "uncommon and local" in Venezuela. It is found in many national parks and other protected areas.
