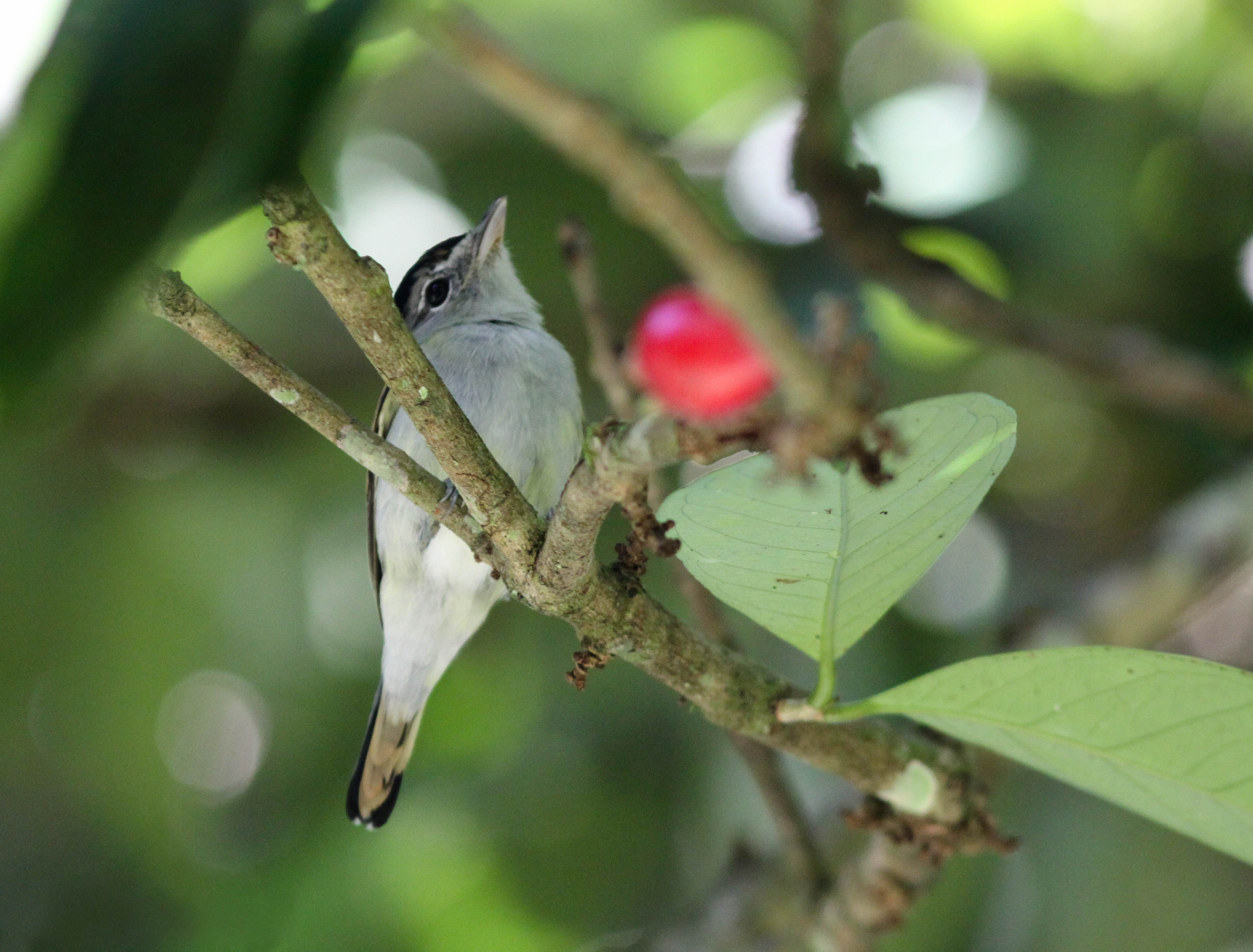
- Male at Perequê, Rio de Janeiro State, Brazil
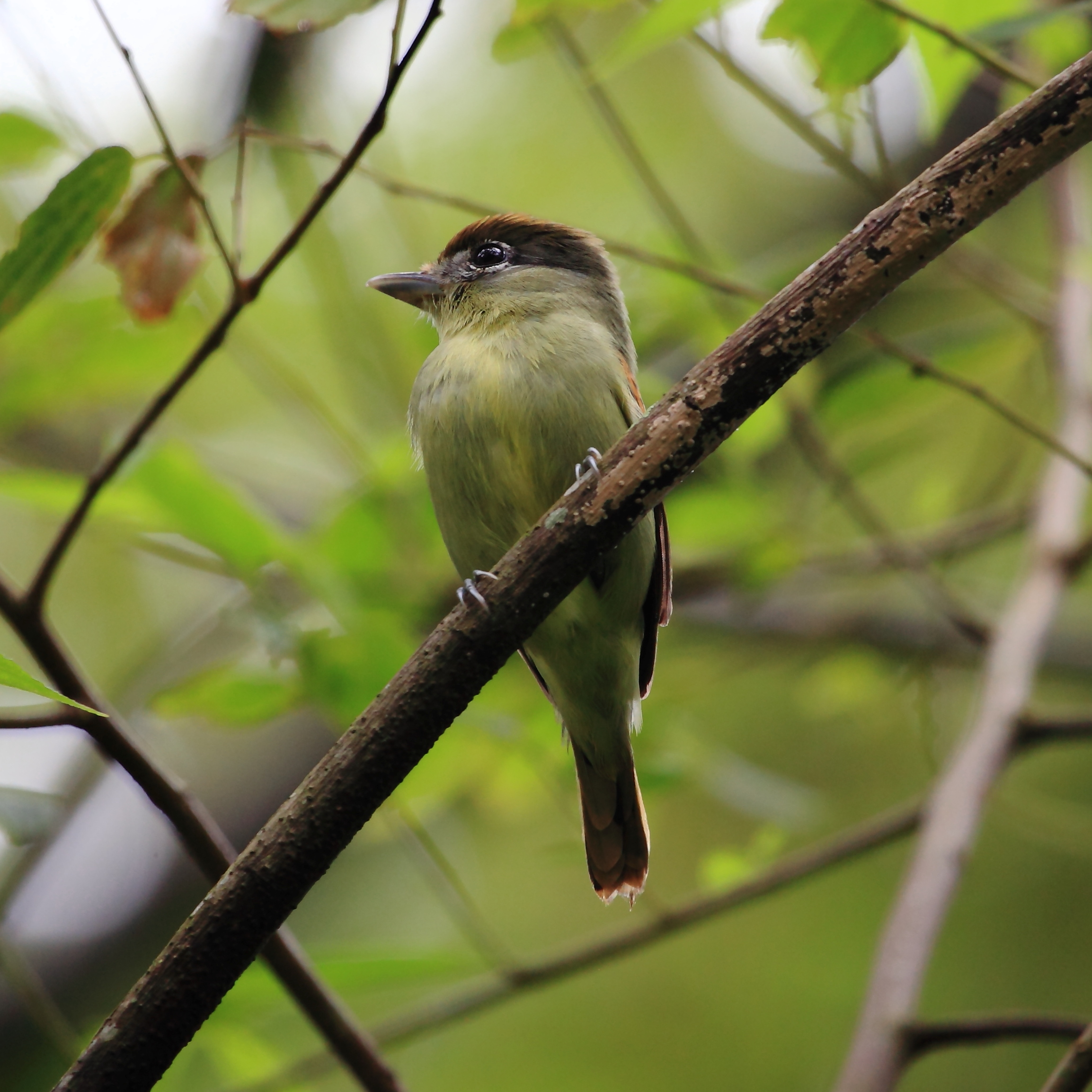
- Female at Restinga de Bertioga State Park, São Paulo state, Brazil

Conservation status
- Least Concern (IUCN 3.1)

Scientific classification
- Kingdom: Animalia
- Phylum: Chordata
- Class: Aves
- Order: Passeriformes
- Family: Tityridae
- Genus: Pachyramphus
- Species: P. marginatus

Binomial name
- Pachyramphus marginatus (Lichtenstein, MHC, 1823)

= Black-capped becard =

Species of bird

The black-capped becard (Pachyramphus marginatus) is a species of bird in the family Tityridae, the tityras, becards, and allies. It is found in Bolivia, Brazil, Colombia, Ecuador, French Guiana, Guyana, Peru, Suriname, and Venezuela.

== Taxonomy and systematics ==
The black-capped becard was originally described in 1823 as Todus marginatus, mistakenly placing it among the todies. It was eventually placed in its present genus Pachyramphus. That genus has variously been assigned to the tyrant flycatcher family Tyrannidae and the cotinga family Cotingidae. Several early twenty-first century studies confirmed the placement of Pachyramphus in Tityridae and taxonomic systems made the reassignment.

The black-capped becard has two subspecies, the nominate P. m. marginatus (Lichtenstein, MHC, 1823) and P. m. nanus (Bangs & Penard, 1921).

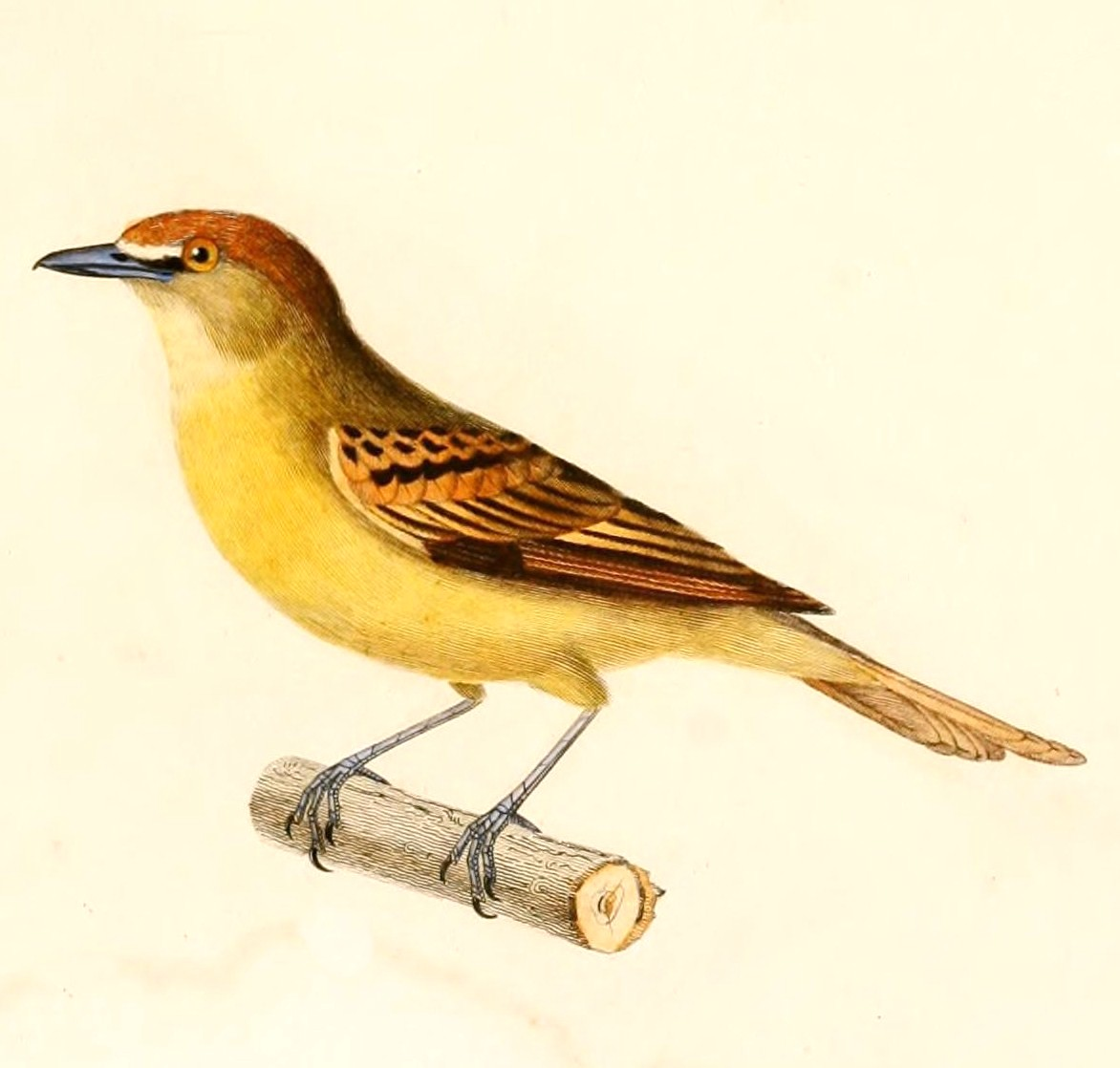
Pachyramphus marginatus 1847

== Description ==
The black-capped becard is 13 to 14 cm (5.1 to 5.5 in) long and weighs about 18 g (0.63 oz). Adult males of the nominate subspecies have a glossy black crown that has a blue sheen and a scaly appearance. They have a pale spot above the lores and a thin whitish eye-ring on an otherwise light gray face. The gray of their face wraps around their nape as a collar. Their back is variable from gray to black and their rump is gray. Their wings are mostly black with white scapulars and widish white edges on the coverts and flight feathers; the white shows as two wing bars. Their tail is black with white tips on the feathers. Their throat is pale gray or pale whitish gray and their underparts are a uniform light gray that sometimes becomes whitish gray on the lower belly and vent. Adult females have a rufous-chestnut crown. They have a grayish spot above the lores and a broken white eye-ring on an otherwise dusky olive face. The color of their face wraps around their nape. Their upperparts are olive. Their wings are mostly dusky with rufescent or cinnamon-olive scapulars and wide rufous edges on the coverts and inner flight feathers. Their tail is dusky with buff-cinnamon tips on the feathers. Their throat and underparts are pale yellow with a dusky tinge on the breast. Subspecies P. m. nanus is smaller than the nominate but otherwise the same. Both subspecies have a dark iris, a dusky or blackish bill, and dusky grayish legs and feet.

== Distribution and habitat ==
The black-capped becard has a disjunct distribution. Subspecies P. m. nanus has by far the larger range of the two. It is found from southeastern Colombia south through eastern Ecuador and eastern Peru into northern Bolivia and east from there across southern and eastern Venezuela, the Guianas, and Amazonian Brazil. In Brazil its range extends east roughly to a line from west-central Mato Grosso northeast to the Atlantic in Maranhão. The nominate subspecies is found in eastern Brazil from Pernambuco south to eastern Paraná.

The black-capped becard primarily inhabits the interior of terra firme forest and mature secondary forest. To a lesser extent it is found at the forest edges. In elevation it is found in Brazil from sea level to 1,000 m (3,300 ft). It reaches 500 m (1,600 ft) in Colombia, 700 m (2,300 ft) in Ecuador, 750 m (2,500 ft) in Peru, and 1,000 m (3,300 ft) in Venezuela.

== Behavior ==
=== Movement ===
The black-capped becard is a year-round resident.

=== Feeding ===
The black-capped becard feeds on insects and fruits. It forages mostly singly or in pairs and regularly joins mixed species feeding flocks. It forages from the forest's mid-story to its canopy and gleans food with short sallies from a perch.

=== Breeding ===
The black-capped becard's breeding season has not been defined but includes April and May in Venezuela and September in southeastern Brazil. Nothing else is known about the species' breeding biology.

=== Vocalization ===
The black-capped becard's dawn song is "a soft, delicate...tew, tew’tweet that rises sharply". Its principle day song is a variable "short melancholy series of clear musical notes" written as "teeu, whee-do-weét, twee-twee-tee-eet, dear-dear or tewtewtewteé, dew-dew". It also makes "a quickly repeated fleur-de-lis phrase" and even-pitched trills "teeu, tee-tee-tee-te-ti or tre-tre’tre-e-e-e-e-it".

== Status ==
The IUCN has assessed the black-capped becard as being of Least Concern. It has a very large range; its population size is not known and is believed to be decreasing. No immediate threats have been identified. It is considered uncommon in Colombia, Ecuador, and Peru and fairly common in Venezuela. It is found in many protected areas both public and private. "Much of this species’ habitat remains in relatively pristine condition within its large range, and it is considered unlikely to be threatened [but the] population in [eastern] Brazil perhaps at greatest risk."
