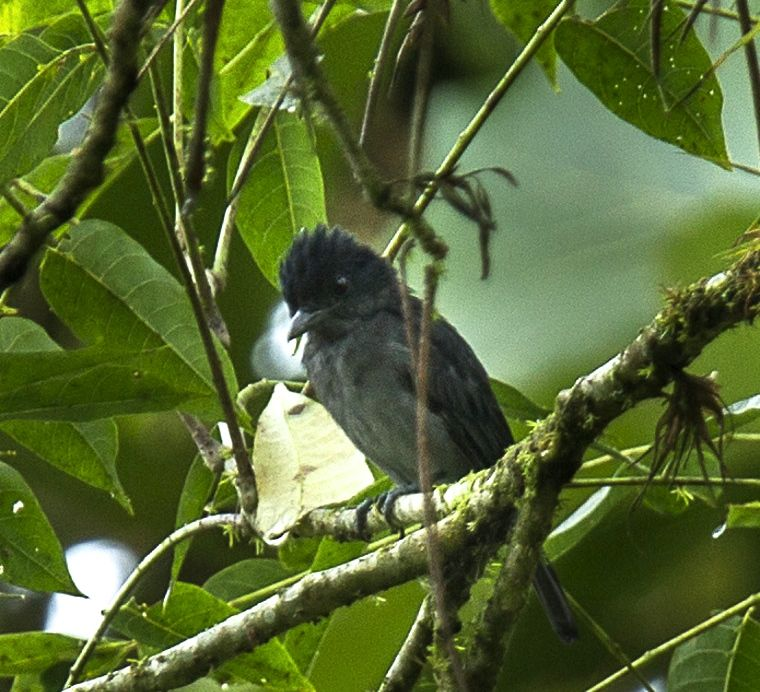

Conservation status
- Vulnerable (IUCN 3.1)

Scientific classification
- Kingdom: Animalia
- Phylum: Chordata
- Class: Aves
- Order: Passeriformes
- Family: Tityridae
- Genus: Pachyramphus
- Species: P. spodiurus

Binomial name
- Pachyramphus spodiurus Sclater, PL, 1860

= Slaty becard =

Species of bird

The slaty becard (Pachyramphus spodiurus) is a Vulnerable species of bird in the family Tityridae, the tityras, becards, and allies. It is found in Ecuador and Peru.

== Taxonomy and systematics ==
The genus Pachyramphus has variously been assigned to the tyrant flycatcher family Tyrannidae and the cotinga family Cotingidae. Several early twenty-first century studies confirmed the placement of Pachyramphus in Tityridae and taxonomic systems leading to the reassignment.

Some twentieth century authors treated the slaty becard and the cinereous becard (P. rufous) as a single species called the "crested becard". They are sister species and form a superspecies.

The slaty becard is monotypic.

== Description ==
The slaty becard is about 14 cm (5.5 in) long. Adult males have a black crown and nape and a whitish spot above the lores on an otherwise slaty gray face. Their upperparts are mostly slaty gray with some black on the back. Their wings are blackish with thin white edges on the flight feathers and a black patch on the primary coverts. Their tail is dusky black; the feathers sometimes have pale grayish edges. Their underparts are gray that is slightly lighter on the throat. Adult females have a dark cinnamon-rufous crown, a pale spot above the lores, and a buff-cinnamon face. Their upperparts are bright cinnamon-rufous. Their wings' flight feathers are blackish with rufescent edges. Their tail is cinnamon. Their throat is whitish. Their underparts are whitish cinnamon-buff that is somewhat more buffy on the upper breast. Both sexes have a dark iris, a blackish bill with a grayish base to the mandible, and blackish legs and feet.

== Distribution and habitat ==
The slaty becard is found in western Ecuador from western Esmeraldas Province south and slightly into northern Peru's Tumbes and Piura departments. It inhabits semi-humid and deciduous woodlands, clearings and plantations with scattered trees, and in a few locations dry scrubby ravines and humid cleared areas. In elevation it occurs mostly below 600 m (2,000 ft) in Ecuador and up to 750 m (2,500 ft) in Peru.

== Behavior ==
=== Movement ===
The slaty becard is a year-round resident.

=== Feeding ===
The slaty becard's diet has not been studied. It typically is found in pairs, usually in the sub-canopy or canopy, but also regularly forages near and on the ground.

=== Breeding ===
The first slaty becard nest was found in Peru in February 2006. It was a globe made from twigs and moss with a side entrance and hanging from a Ceiba tree branch about 15 m (50 ft) above the ground. Both members of the pair visited the nest, whose contents could not be seen. Another was found in April 2006 in Ecuador. It too was a globe but was made mostly from thin live Tillandsia fibers. It was woven into a three-way branch fork of a Ceiba tree and also about 15 m (50 ft) above the ground. It contained two nestlings. The female brooded them and both parents provisioned them. The only identifiable item fed was a small green caterpillar. Nothing else is known about the species' breeding biology.

=== Vocalization ===
The slaty becard's song is "a short fast series of musical notes that start slowly and then quickly accelerate and rise in pitch and become a little louder, tu, tu, tee-tee-titititittrí". It also "gives a 2-second-long, slurred trill, starting lower, then evenly pitched".

== Status ==
The IUCN originally in 1988 assessed the slaty becard as being of Least Concern, then in 2000 as Endangered and since 2019 as Vulnerable. It is found in discrete locations in its overall fairly large range. Its estimated population of between 1000 and 2500 mature individuals is believed to be decreasing. "The main threats to the species are habitat loss due to agricultural expansion and subsequent herbicide use, selective felling of valuable trees and persistent grazing by goats and cattle inside and outside of protected areas...Significant habitat loss continues in both Ecuador and Peru, at least in unprotected areas, and soon all lowland forest will have been removed unless effective action is taken urgently...However, the species has been reported to persist in some areas that have been subject to a substantial degree of habitat degradation." It is considered "scarce and local" in Ecuador and "uncommon" in Peru. It is found in several nominally protected areas but some of them are subject to illegal clearing and grazing.
