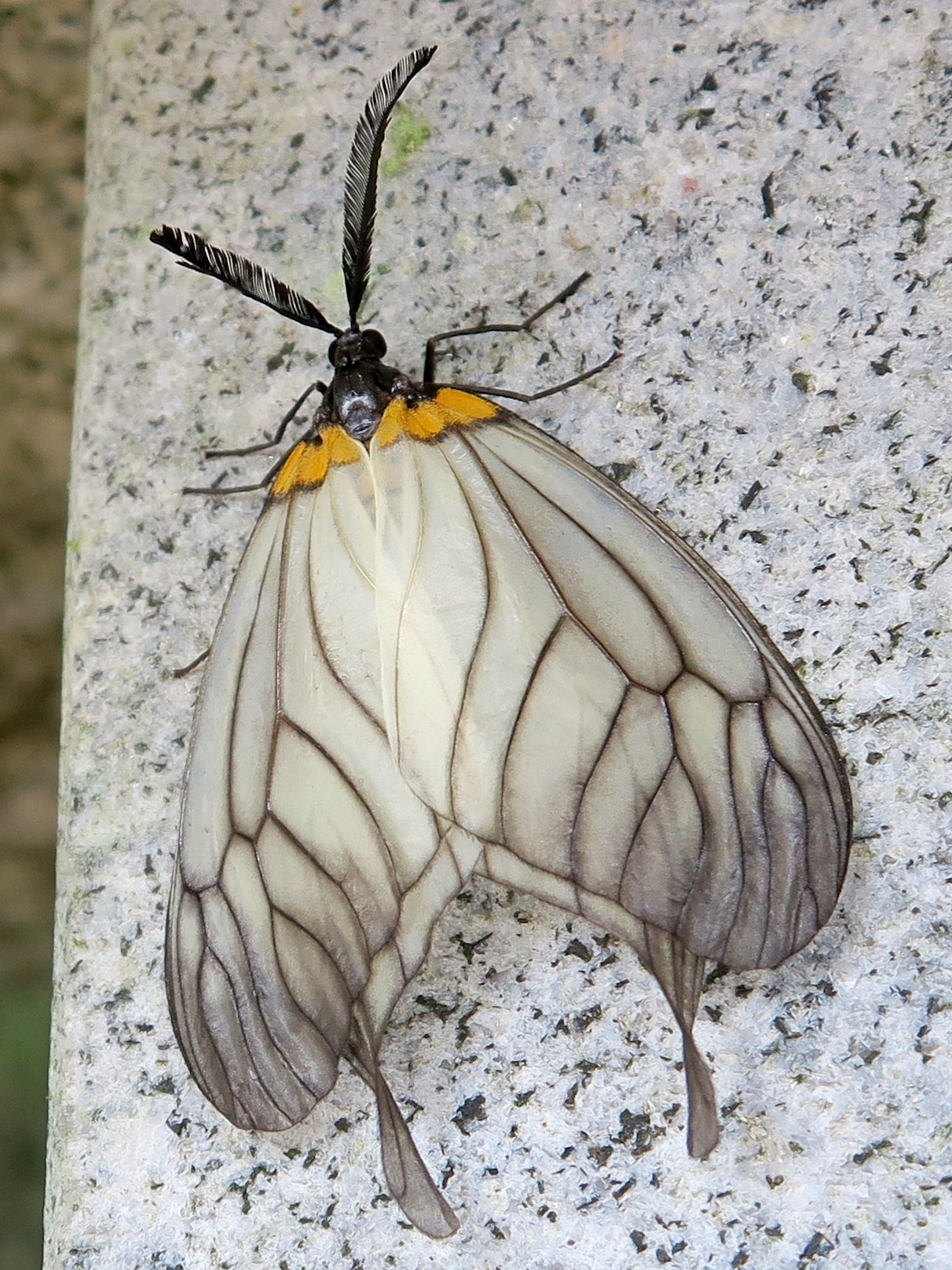
- Male in Kōka, Shiga Prefecture

Scientific classification
- Kingdom: Animalia
- Phylum: Arthropoda
- Class: Insecta
- Order: Lepidoptera
- Family: Zygaenidae
- Genus: Elcysma
- Species: E. westwoodi

Binomial name
- Elcysma westwoodi (Vollenhoven, 1863)

Synonyms
- Agalope westwoodii Vollenhoven, 1863; Elcysma translucida Butler, 1881

= Elcysma westwoodi =

Species of moth

Elcysma westwoodi (often spelled Elcysma westwoodii), commonly known as the white-tailed zygaenid moth, is a species of moth in the burnet moth family Zygaenidae. It has a Palaearctic distribution, being found in Japan, the Korean Peninsula, China, and the Russian Far East. The species was first described by Samuel Constantinus Snellen van Vollenhoven in 1863 as Agalope westwoodii.

The white-tailed zygaenid is particularly known for its status as an agricultural pest for members of the family Rosaceae, and has been described as the most damaging pest for Prunus yedoensis trees. Studies have been conducted on the potential for the use of endoparasites in mitigating the extent of damage on crop trees.

The Japanese common name alludes to the swallow, of which the moth's hindwings resemble the tails of. The Korean common name refers to its status as an agricultural pest of the cherry tree.

== Description ==
Adults have a wingspan of 60 millimetres (2.4 in). The moths have translucent white wings, with gray veins. The base of the front wing is yellow in color. The adult moth resembles Parnassius glacialis in appearance, and it is often misidentified as a Pierid butterfly, and Limacodidae because of pterothorax morphology. The hindwings have an elongated tail. The tail is formed from the veins between the fourth and seventh vein on the hindwing extending further past the remaining veins. The abdomen is dark brown in color. Adults of Elcysma westwoodi exude noxious substances in the form of a white foam from the head area if distressed.

Male moths have a pair of genital claspers that resemble forceps. During mating, male moths grasp the tip of the female's abdomen with the claspers and additionally fluttering their wings to attempt to mate with the female. Of which the female moth can reject attempts to mate. These claspers resemble those found in related moth genera Achelura and Agalope, as well as the related Elcysma dohertyi. Male moths can be externally identified as such by their antennae, which are plumose, meaning they resemble that of a comb.

Female moth abdomens in the seventh and eighth abdominal segment of E. westwoodi are sclerotized, or made further robust by the addition of sclerotin. It was likely that they evolved to be more smooth and difficult for males to grasp onto during mating. Females can be externally identified by their antennae, which lack the comb-like structure that the males antennae have, and instead appear smooth due to their shorter bristles.

== Life history ==
Elcysma westwoodi display monandrous behavior, females mate with one male at a time. Additionally, Elcysma westwoodi is univoltine, producing one generation of moths yearly. Males search for females during the morning of the breeding season, during which copulation additionally occurs. Females are located through the use of pheromones emitted by the female moth as it rests on a surface. Olfaction is believed to be important during the search for a mate. While performing mating behavior, male moths often gather onto a single female moth. Male gathering behavior tend to attract more males to a single female, of whom can reject other males which congregate in search of a mate. The process of male congregation gives rise to potential sexual selection by the female for ideal traits for a male partner. Mating tends to last several hours, after which females leave to find hostplants to lay their eggs on. Oviposition occurs during the afternoon. Females lay their eggs on the bark or leaves of hostplants in groups of 20 eggs. The female moth will lay a total of around 100 eggs individually.

Studies by Koshio et al. found that females preferred males with symmetrical antennae and claspers. E. westwoodi males, in addition to males of a Cerambycid beetle, apparently enjoyed a preference by females on the basis of symmetric antennae. It is unknown as to why there is a relationship between symmetry and sexual selection by the female.

Larvae feed on the following hostplants: Celtis sinensis, Chaenomeles speciosa, Malus prunifolia, Prunus armeniaca, Prunus mume, Prunus salicina, and Prunus yedoensis. Most food plants are economically important plants in the family Rosaceae in the agricultural industry, and thus make E. westwoodi an agricultural pest. Outbreaks of the larvae caused by favorable conditions can cause significant agricultural damage.

The larvae are often seen in the vicinity of parks due to their diet of cherry foliage. The larvae are yellow, with black hairs emerging from the body. The body is vertically striped with black and yellow, and resemble the larvae of Pryeria sinica. The moths overwinter in the larval state. During the overwintering period, larvae gather in groups hiding under ground cover or fallen leaves. Larvae eat the leaves individually, but can often work together to defoliate the hostplant. They tend not to make enough damage to entirely kill a tree. However, defoliation can severely inhibit the growth of the hostplant. In particular the somei yoshino cherry tree, which can develop rot if defoliated, due to its sensitivity towards pruning and pest damage. It takes 50 days for the larva to reach a pupal state after 50 days spent overwintering. Larvae are found in the open during the summer, from May to June.

Pupae are often attached to the midrib, the central vein, of hostplant leaves. Pupae consist of an outer cocoon, which is made of silk which is soaked in excretions by the larva during the pupation process and hardened, and the pupa inside. The pupa externally appears irregular in shape. The moth spends 100–120 days as a pupa.

Adult moths emerge between the months of late September and early October. The moths are diurnal, and fly during the daytime. Adults engage in a dainty and weak flight. Moths fly in small groups during the mating period, attracted by pheromones emitted by the female moth. After mating and laying eggs, the adult moths die.

== Interactions with humans ==
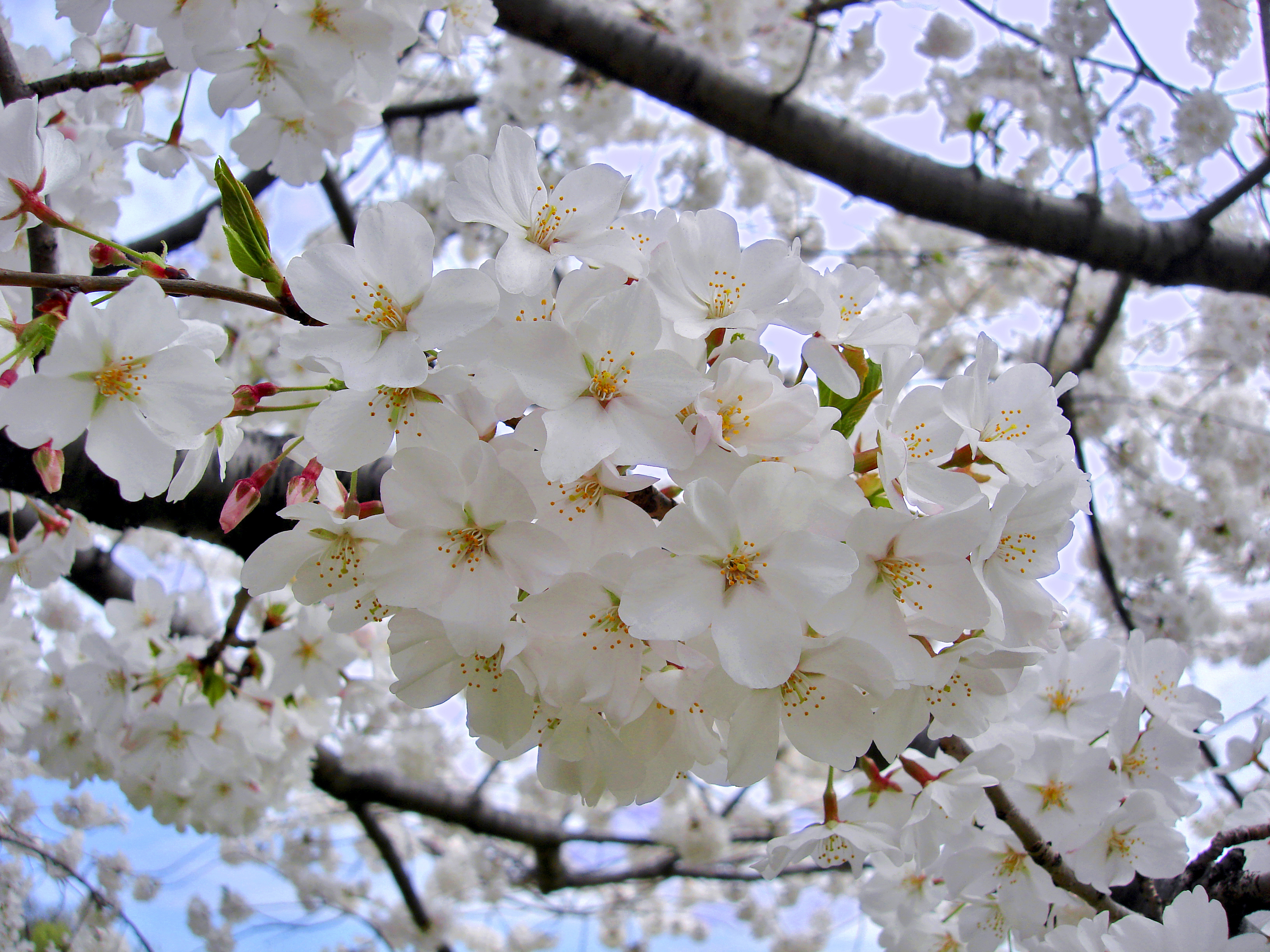
Flowers of Prunus yedoensis, a common hostplant

The larvae of Elcysma westwoodi is considered "the most damaging lepidopteran pest of Prunus yedoensis" trees. Farmers who are impacted by E. westwoodi larvae can use a variety of methods to mitigate crop damage. There is no single way to eradicate the moth larvae, and as a result local governments have found difficulty in mitigating crop damage. Pest control methods include: chemical, biological, and eradication by physical means. Biological control entails using predators and endoparasites to rid trees of larvae, chemical control entails the use of diluted chemicals to kill the larvae, while physical control methods include burning or burying overwintering larvae, or physically removing larvae from the trees. Chemical control methods have proven ineffective, as larvae are only temporarily removed from the host plant and later return. Due to a particularly mild winter and frequent rain in the Ulsan region of Korea, a particularly intense outbreak of the larvae occurred in 2021. The Taehwagang National Garden of Ulsan has been particularly affected by frequent outbreaks of E. westwoodi.

== Predators and parasites ==
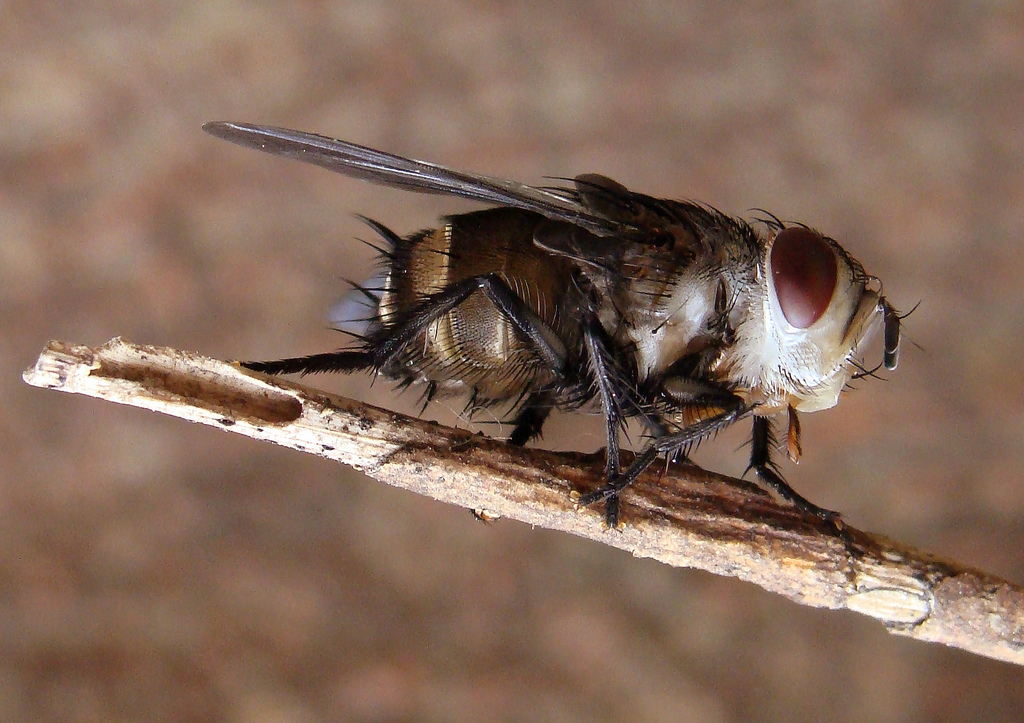
Compsilura concinnata (Endoparasite)

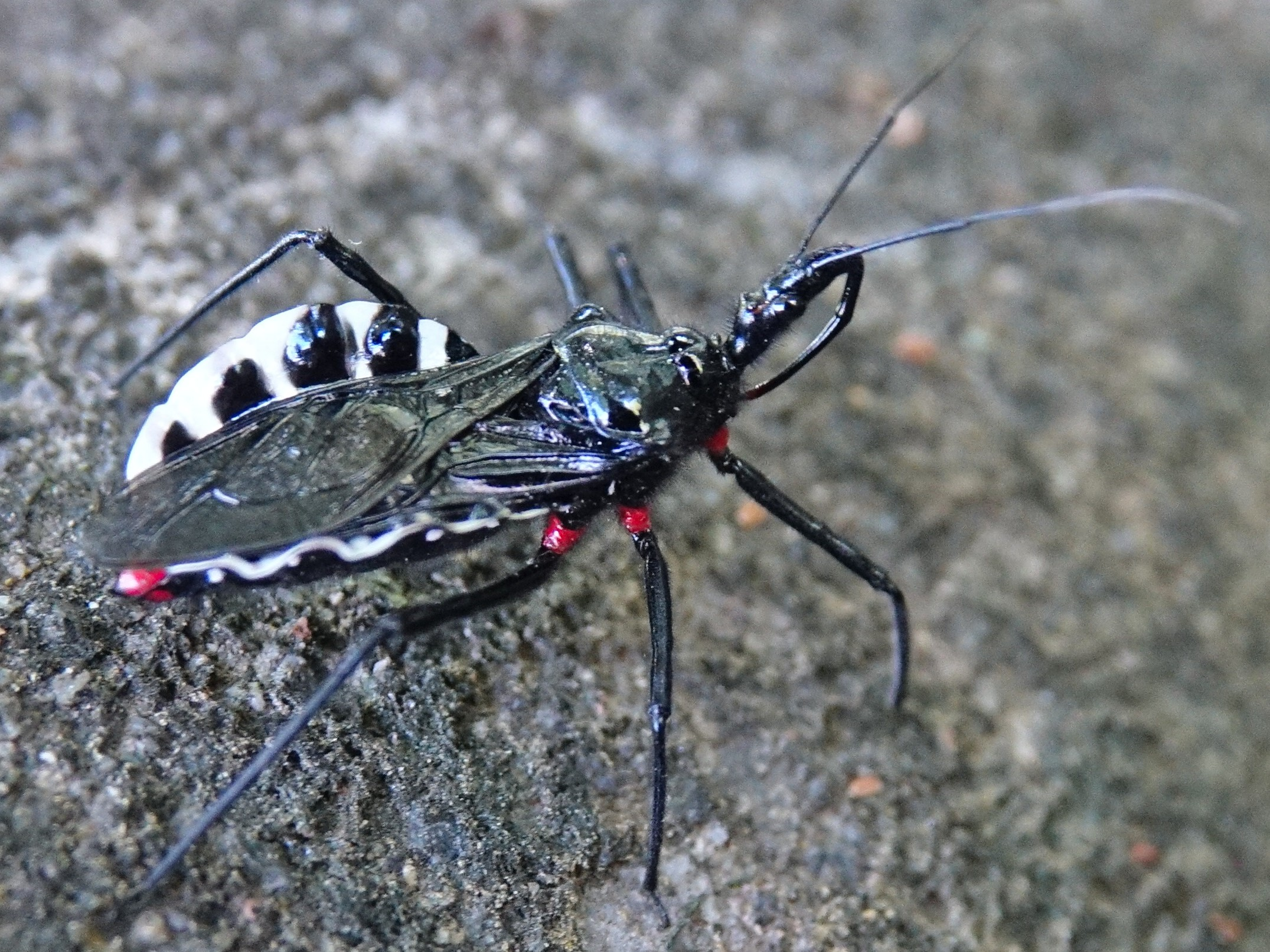
Agriosphodrus dohrni (Predator)

Elcysma westwoodi was found to be preyed upon by endoparasitoids from across a wide range of insect orders and families. Hymenopteran parasites included Charops striatus in the family Ichneumonidae, and a member of the family Braconidae. Dipteran parasites consisted of representatives from the family Tachinidae: including Compsilura concinnata, a member of the genus Exorista, a member of the genus Pales, and another unidentified member of the Tachinid family of flies. All parasitoids were koinobiont parasitoids, meaning that the parasitoids continued to feed off the host body while the host develops. The larva was able to continue eating and engaging in moulting while being parasitized.

Studies from Cho et al. found that Hymenopterans parasitized 68.9% of the sampled larvae, while Dipterans parasitized the remaining 31.1%. Of the 926 larvae sampled, only 45, or 4.86% were parasitized.

In addition to being preyed upon by endoparasitic wasps and flies, the larvae are preyed upon by predators such as reduviid bugs like Agriosphodrus dohrni.

== Distribution ==
Elcysma westwoodi is found in Japan, China, the Korean Peninsula, and the Russian Far East.

In Japan, it is found throughout the islands of Honshu, Shikoku, and Kyushu. It is restricted to the western portion of the Japanese archipelago. Despite its diet of cherry trees, a national symbol of Japan and commonly planted, it is fairly uncommon and the moth is mostly found in the Kansai region. In Korea, it inhabits the central and southern portions of the Korean peninsula. In Russia, it is found in Primorsky Krai.

The nominate subspecies westwoodi is found on the Japanese archipelago and the Korean peninsula. The subspecies caudata is found in the Russian Far East.

=== Habitats ===
It is found in flatlands and mountainous areas.

== Taxonomy ==
Elcysma westwoodi was originally described by Samuel Constantinus Snellen van Vollenhoven as a member of the genus Agalope under the name Agalope westwoodii. It was then reclassified into the genus Elcysma as its type species in 1881 by Arthur Gardiner Butler under the synonym Elcysma translucida.

There are a total of three or four subspecies known [per Mindat.org:]

- Elcysma westwoodi caudata Bremer, 1864
- Elcysma westwoodi eleganticauda Bryk, 1948
- Elcysma westwoodi westwoodi Vollenhoven, 1863

The following may be treated as a subspecies or a distinct species.

- Elcysma westwoodi dohertyi Elwes, 1890

== Etymology ==
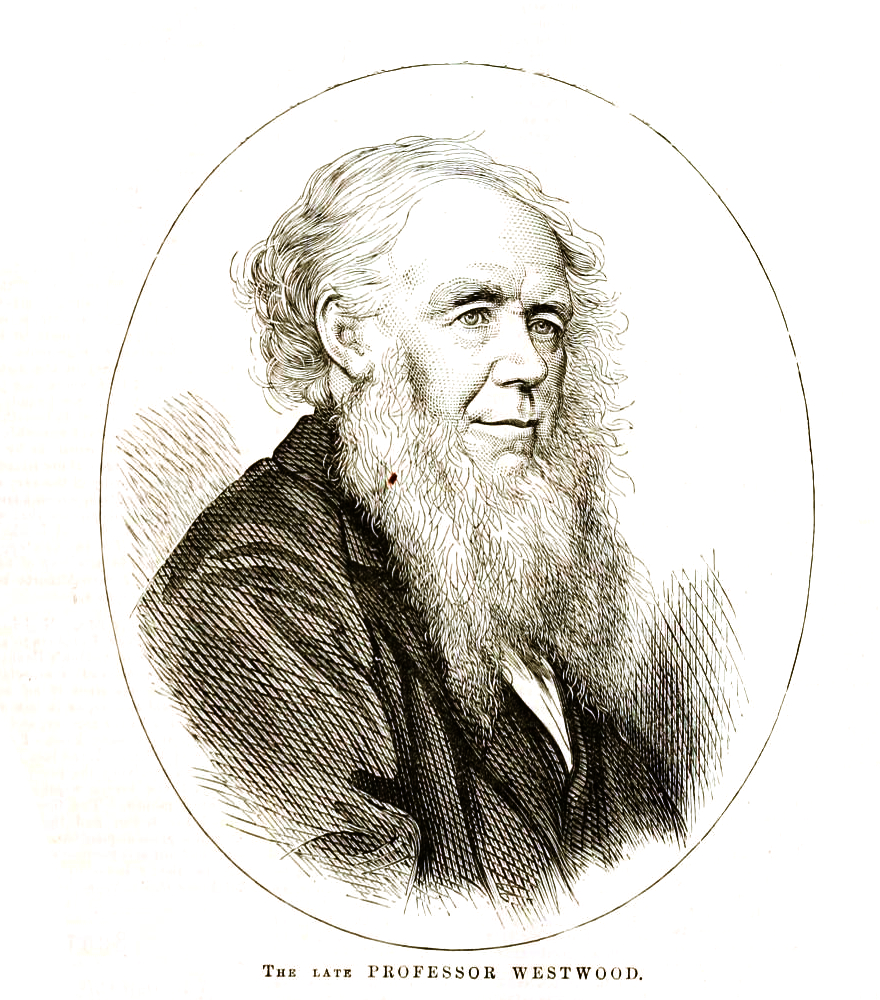
John O. Westwood, of whom Vollenhoven named the moth after

The species epithet honours John O. Westwood, curator of the Museum of Oxford and prominent entomologist. There exists uncertainty among sources as to the proper spelling of the specific epithet, with some sources spelling it as "westwoodii". These include the European Nucleotide Archive, the National Center for Biotechnology Information, and Koshio et al.. This falls in line with Vollenhoven's original spelling of "westwoodii" in his original description. However it is spelled as "westwoodi" by the Catalogue of Life, Mindat.org, the Encyclopedia of Life, and the Global Biodiversity Information Facility.

Elcysma westwoodi is often known as the white-tailed zygaenid moth in English. The English common name refers to the tails typical to moths in the genus Elcysma, a member of the family Zygaenidae. It is additionally referred to as the Tailed Zygaenid in English.

The Japanese language common name means swallow, referring to the shape of the hind wings, which resemble the tails of a swallow bird. The Korean language common name means "cherry tree moth," alluding to its larval diet of cherry leaves.
