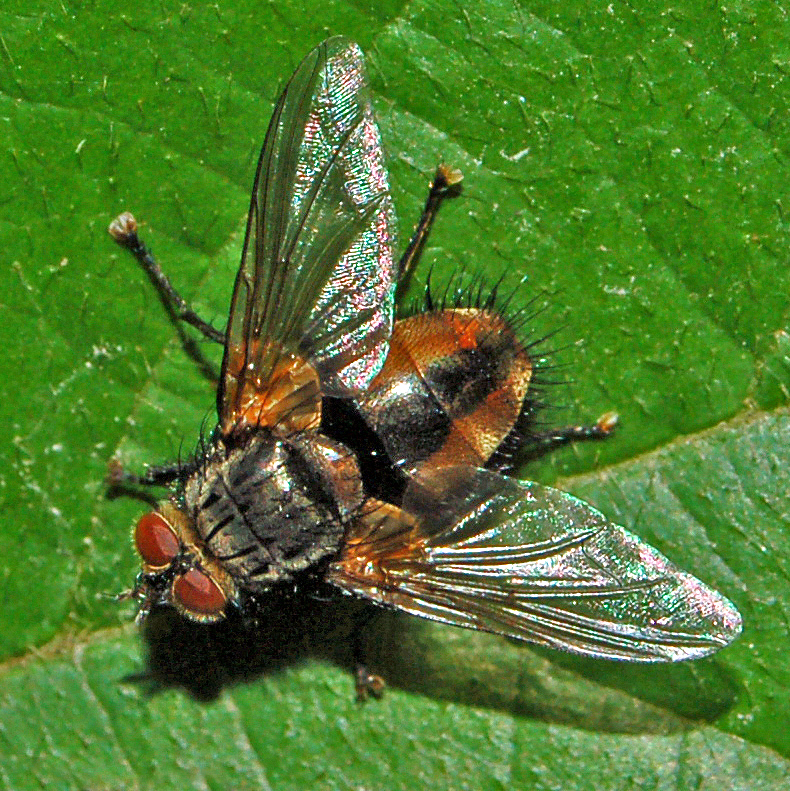
- Nemoraea pellucida. Male

Scientific classification
- Kingdom: Animalia
- Phylum: Arthropoda
- Clade: Pancrustacea
- Class: Insecta
- Order: Diptera
- Family: Tachinidae
- Genus: Nemoraea
- Species: N. pellucida

Binomial name
- Nemoraea pellucida (Meigen, 1824)

Synonyms
- List: Nemoraea affinis Robineau-Desvoidy, 1830; Nemoraea bombylans Robineau-Desvoidy, 1830; Nemoraea conjuncta Macquart, 1848; Nemoraea discreta Robineau-Desvoidy, 1863; Nemoraea fulva Robineau-Desvoidy, 1830; Nemoraea fulva Robineau-Desvoidy, 1863; Nemoraea nupta Rondani, 1859; Nemoraea sponsa Rondani, 1865; Nemoraea vicina Macquart, 1849; Nemoraea vulnerata Zetterstedt, 1849; Tachina neglecta Meigen, 1824; Tachina pellucida Meigen, 1824; Tachina rubrica Meigen, 1824

= Nemoraea pellucida =

Species of fly

Nemoraea pellucida is a species of fly in the family Tachinidae.

== Distribution ==
This species is present in most of Europe, in Russia, in Asia, in Japan and in North Africa.

== Description ==
Nemoraea pellucida can reach a length of 13.5–14.5 millimetres (0.53–0.57 in). These medium-sized flies have rather small head in respect of their body. In the males the thorax is grayish, with black lines. The scutellum is reddish and the abdomen is orange-yellow, with yellowish white pollinosity and a median black vitta. Legs are black. In a smaller form scutellum and abdomen are black. In the females the scutellum and the abdominal tergites arealways wholly black.

== Biology ==
Adults of these endoparasitoid flies can be found from March to May and in October-November. They mainly feed on nectar of Angelica sylvestris. The females lay their eggs close to the ovations of the host species, especially Hyphantria cunea, Orthosia cerasi, Dypterygia scabriuscula and Sphinx pinastri). When the larvae of the host are born, the larvae of these flies feed on the larvae of the host.
