= Macromya depressa =

Scientific classification
- Kingdom: Animalia
- Phylum: Arthropoda
- Class: Insecta
- Order: Diptera
- Family: Tachinidae
- Subfamily: Tachininae
- Tribe: Nemoraeini
- Genus: Macromya
- Species: M. depressa

Binomial name
- Macromya depressa Robineau-Desvoidy, 1830

Synonyms
- Macromya dorsalis Wulp, 1888

Species of fly

Macromya depressa is a species of bristle fly in the family Tachinidae.

== Distribution ==
Costa Rica, Guatemala, Mexico, Panama, Brazil, Ecuador, Venezuela.
