= Macromya ciniscula =

Scientific classification
- Kingdom: Animalia
- Phylum: Arthropoda
- Class: Insecta
- Order: Diptera
- Family: Tachinidae
- Subfamily: Tachininae
- Tribe: Nemoraeini
- Genus: Macromya
- Species: M. ciniscula

Binomial name
- Macromya ciniscula Reinhard, 1968

Species of fly

Macromya ciniscula is a species of bristle fly in the family Tachinidae.

== Distribution ==
Brazil.
