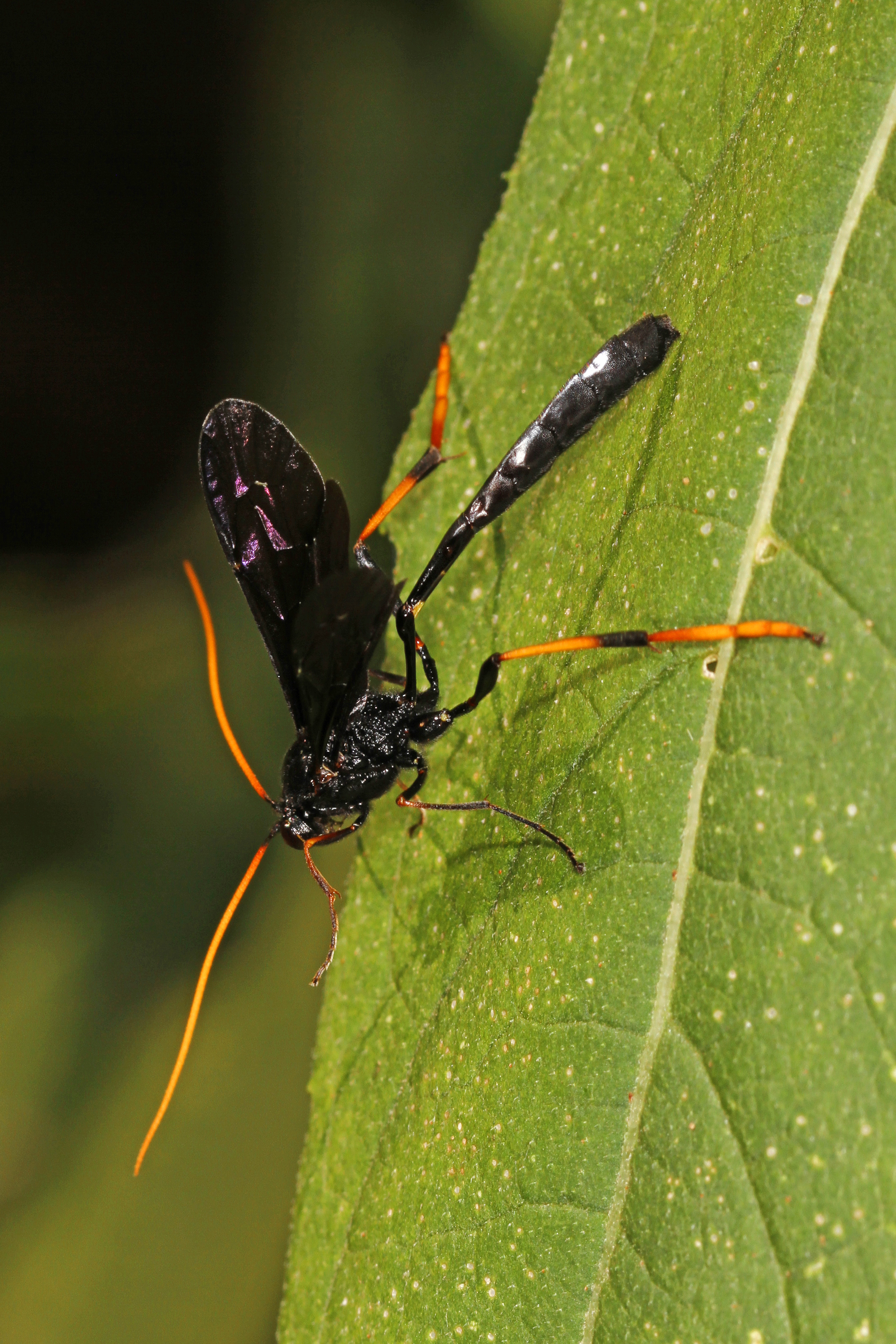

Scientific classification
- Kingdom: Animalia
- Phylum: Arthropoda
- Class: Insecta
- Order: Hymenoptera
- Family: Ichneumonidae
- Genus: Therion
- Species: T. morio

Binomial name
- Therion morio (Fabricius, 1781)

Synonyms
- Exochilum Mundum (Say); Ophion Mundus (Say)

= Therion morio =

Species of wasp

Therion morio is a species of parasitic ichneumon wasp in the family Ichneumonidae. It is a parasite of the webworm caterpillar in North America.

== Reproduction ==
T. morio adults lay their eggs inside webworm caterpillars by piercing them with their ovipositor. Like H. fulvipes, their eggs consist of an equatorial disc and a caudal stalk, making them look a bit like the cartoon oil lamp from Aladdin. It's thought that the shape is adapted to attach the egg to the inside of the caterpillar's integument. The egg partially hatches, and the next stage is termed a "feeding embryo", as this first stage larvae feeds through the inner membrane of the egg which still contains it. The second stage larva emerges from this inner membrane and continues to feed on the caterpillar. The head capsule of the second stage larva is much less chitinised than the first. The third stage larva is similar in appearance to the second stage larvae; Tothill describes it as a "dirty-looking, whitish grub." However, the third stage has spiracles.
