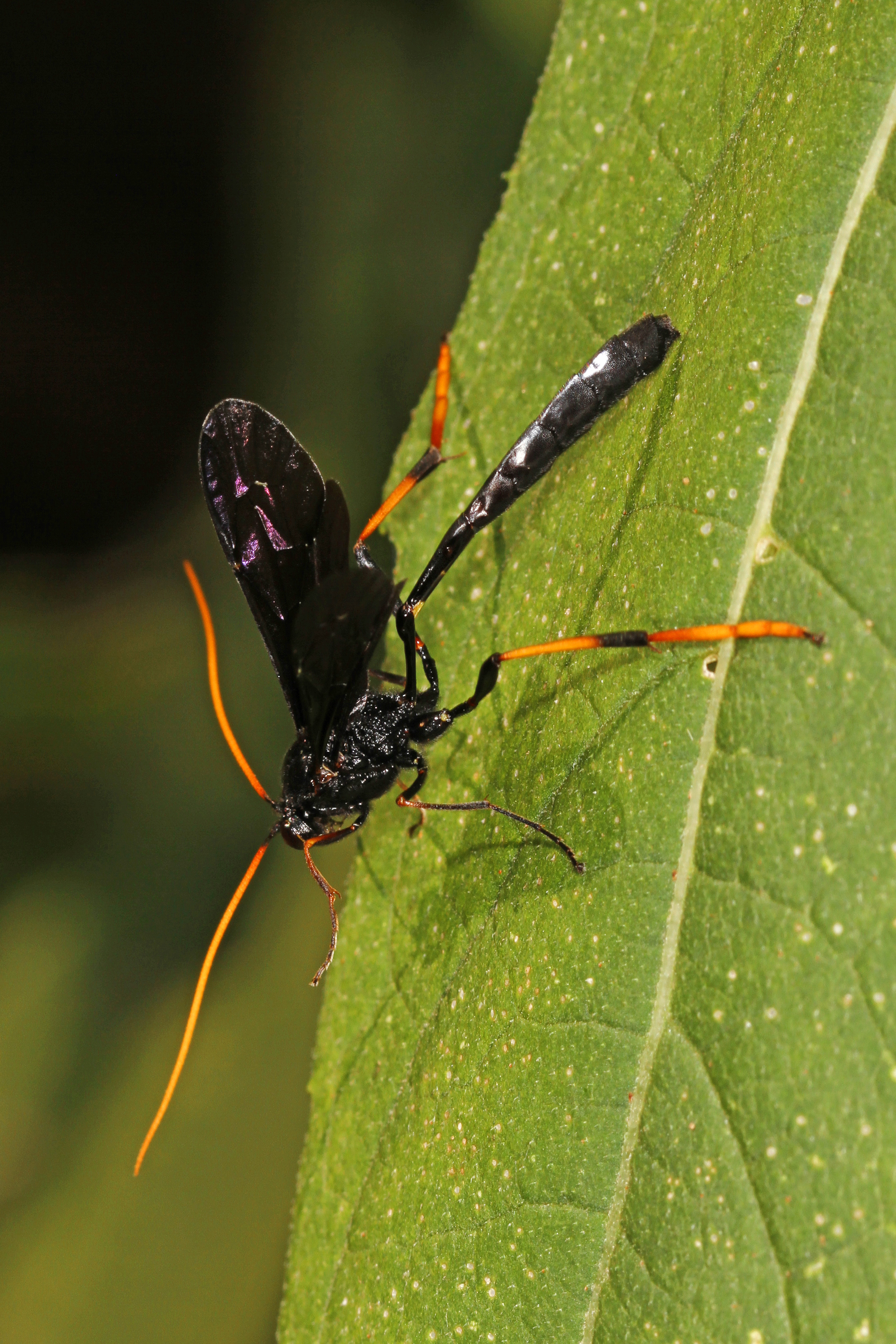
- Therion morio

Scientific classification
- Kingdom: Animalia
- Phylum: Arthropoda
- Class: Insecta
- Order: Hymenoptera
- Family: Ichneumonidae
- Tribe: Gravenhorstiini
- Genus: Therion; Curtis, 1829

Synonyms
- Therium Agassiz, 1846; Exochilum Wesmael, 1849

= Therion (wasp) =

Genus of wasps

Therion is a genus of ichneumon wasps in the family Ichneumonidae. There are at least 20 described species in Therion.

== Species ==
- Therion brevicorne (Gravenhorst, 1829)^{c g}
- Therion californicum (Cresson, 1879)^{c g}
- Therion circumflexum (Linnaeus, 1758)^{c g}
- Therion ericae (Bauer, 1967)^{c g}
- Therion fuscipenne (Norton, 1863)^{c g}
- Therion giganteum (Gravenhorst, 1829)^{c g}
- Therion inusitatum (Brues, 1910)^{c g}
- Therion magnum (Dasch, 1984)^{c g}
- Therion minutum (Dasch, 1984)^{c g}
- Therion morio (Fabricius, 1781)^{c g b}
- Therion mussouriense (Cameron, 1897)^{c g}
- Therion nigripes (Dreisbach, 1947)^{c g}
- Therion nigrovarium (Brulle, 1846)^{c g}
- Therion petiolatum (Davis, 1898)^{c b}
- Therion ranti (Porter, 1999)^{c g}
- Therion rufomaculatum (Uchida, 1928)^{c g}
- Therion sassacus (Viereck, 1917)^{c g}
- Therion tarsatum (Shestakov, 1923)^{c g}
- Therion tenuipes (Norton, 1863)^{c g}
- Therion texanum (Ashmead, 1890)^{c}
- Therion unguiculum (Gauld, 1978)^{c g}
- Therion wileyi (Porter, 1999)^{c g}
- †Therion brachypodicum Zhang, Sun & Zhang, 1994^{c g}

Data sources: i = ITIS, c = Catalogue of Life, g = GBIF, b = Bugguide.net
