= Therion brachypodicum =

Scientific classification
- Domain: Eukaryota
- Kingdom: Animalia
- Phylum: Arthropoda
- Class: Insecta
- Order: Hymenoptera
- Family: Ichneumonidae
- Genus: Therion
- Species: T. brachypodicum

Binomial name
- Therion brachypodicum Zhang, Sun & Zhang, 1994

Extinct species of wasp

Therion brachypodicum is an extinct insect that belongs to the family Ichneumonidae in the Hymenoptera order. The last known appearance of this species was 11.61 million years ago. The scientific name of this species was first published in 1994 by Zhang, Sun & Zhang
