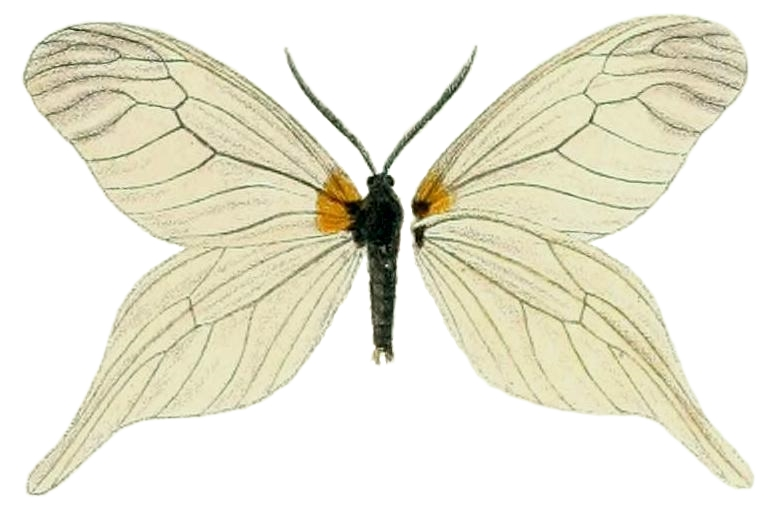

Scientific classification
- Domain: Eukaryota
- Kingdom: Animalia
- Phylum: Arthropoda
- Class: Insecta
- Order: Lepidoptera
- Family: Zygaenidae
- Subfamily: Chalcosiinae
- Genus: Elcysma; Butler, 1881

= Elcysma =

Genus of moths

Elcysma is a genus of moths of the family Zygaenidae. The genus was erected by Arthur Gardiner Butler in 1881.

== Selected species ==
- Elcysma delavayi Oberthür, 1891
- Elcysma dohertyi (Elwes, 1890)
- Elcysma westwoodi (Snellen van Vollenhoven, 1863) – white-tailed zygaenid
- Elcysma ziroensis (Chada, Gogoi & Young, 2017) Apatani glory
