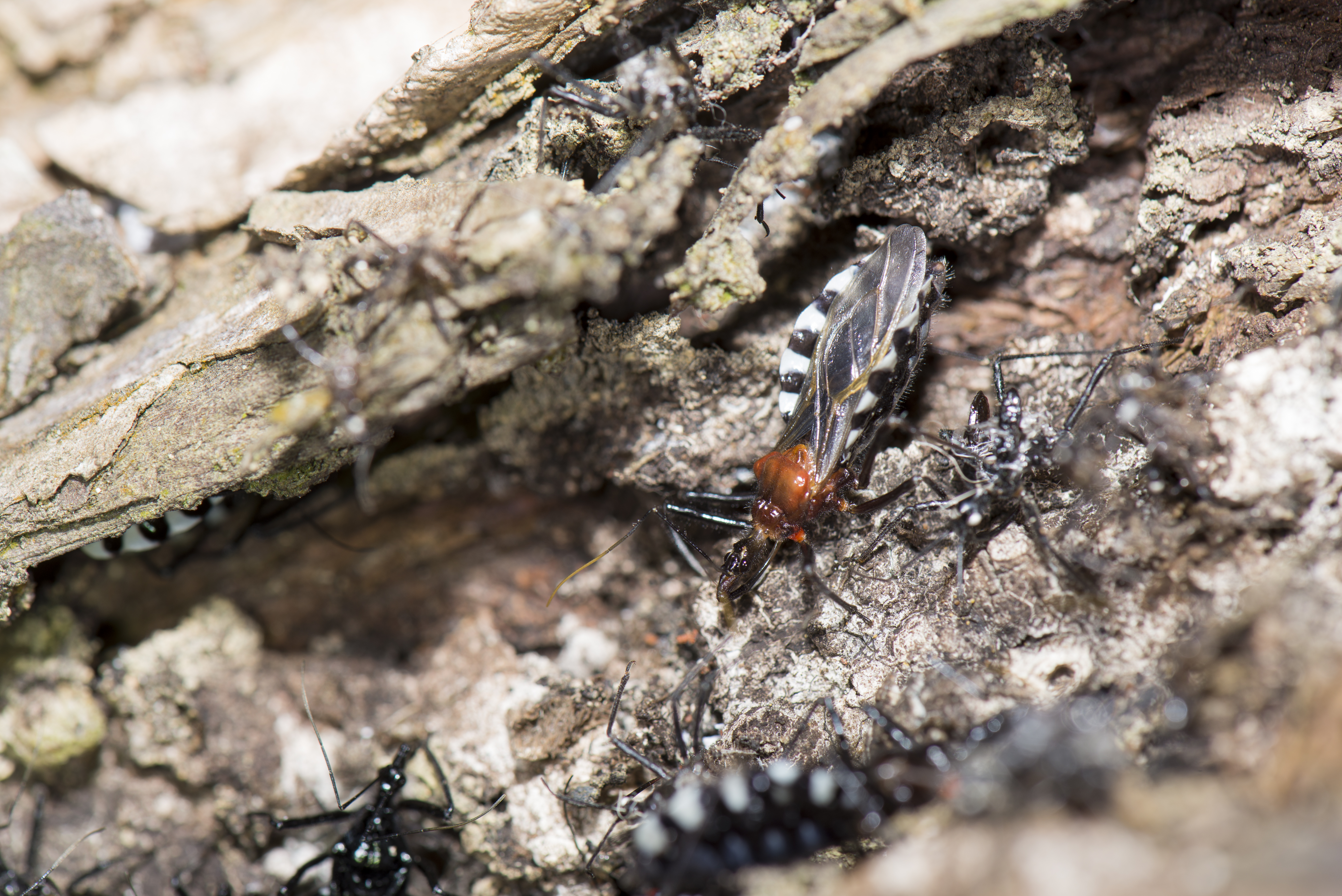

Scientific classification
- Kingdom: Animalia
- Phylum: Arthropoda
- Clade: Pancrustacea
- Class: Insecta
- Order: Hemiptera
- Suborder: Heteroptera
- Family: Reduviidae
- Subfamily: Harpactorinae
- Tribe: Harpactorini
- Genus: Agriosphodrus; Stål, 1866
- Species: A. dohrni

Binomial name
- Agriosphodrus dohrni (Signoret, 1862)

= Agriosphodrus =

Genus of insects

Agriosphodrus is a genus with a sole species, A. dohrni, the Japanese assassin bug. It is a species of insect in the family Reduviidae, found in China, Southeast Asia, India and Japan. It lives in trunks of various trees near human habitation, like parks and roadsides, mostly found on poplar, willow and tree of heavens. Despite its common name, the species is not native to Japan, where it was first recorded in 1930 and is considered invasive.

== Taxonomy and phylogeny ==
Agriosphodrus is a monotypic genus of assassin bugs in the subfamily Harpactorinae. A second species formerly assigned to Agriosphodrus, A. perelegans, found in Vietnam, was moved to the genus Cosmosycanus in 2004.

== Description ==
This large assassin bug can reach body lengths of up to 25 mm (99 in) in females and up to 20 (0.81 in) in males. It features a glossy black body with white wax spots along their sides. They are covered in long, upright hairs, accendet by pale to dark yellow spots along its head and the edge of its flared abdomen. Females display a red tip at the end of thei abdomen, while males have a red patch on their lower belly.

== Behavior ==
=== Life cycle ===
The life cycle of Agriosphodrus dohrni progresses through three main development stages: hatching, molting and emergence.

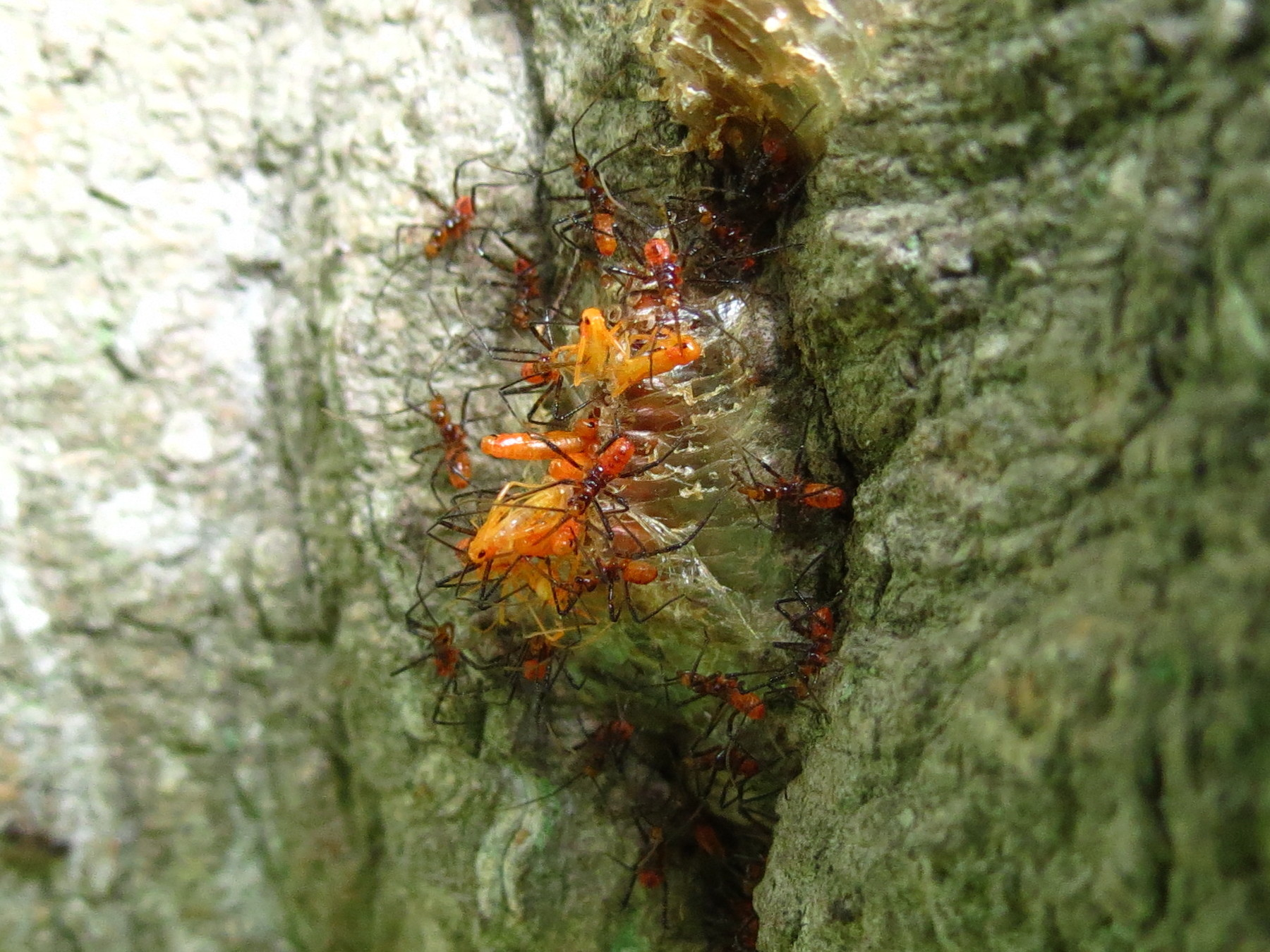
Agriosphodrus dohrni preying on own kind at hatching

They hatch from their eggs from early May to Mid-June into soft, yellow nymphs that harden dark, active forms within 20 hours. As they grow, the nymphs undergo several 30-minutes molting stages to shed their outer skin, culminating in a final 50 to 60 minutes emergence phase they unfurl their wings and mature into fully formed adults.

=== Colonization and cannibalism ===
This bug perform significant colonization: nymphs hatched from the same eggs remain together on tree trunks throughout their development, hunt together cooperatively and share the pray they capture. However, cannibalism has been observed, that newborns prey on other egg masses and adults prey on nymphs, when there is a high population density. Previously, it was believed that the cause of this behaviour was lack of food.

=== Mating ===
Mating in Agriosphodrus dohrni proceed through courtship, mounting, copulation and cleaning. The male courts and the female using his legs and antenna before mounting her back and securing himself a by inserting his beak into her neck. This riding phase lasts up to 12 to 24 hours, actual copulation takes 30 to 45 minutes.

== Relationship with humans ==
Though generally non-aggressive, this bug can sting people, causing a painful reaction.

The natural habitat of Agriosphodrus dohrni covers mainland China, Southeast Asia, and India. The species was introduced to Japan, where it was first described Kyushu in 1930 before expanding its range into the Kantō region in 1990. It is now classified as invasive species in Japan due to its predation on native anthropods as well as cases of painful stings to humans. Japanese authorities have not implemented any mitigation, control or eradication programs.

Despite its invasive status, they have drawn interest as a natural enemy of other invasive species such as fall webworm and Parasa lepida. It is seen as an potential biocontrol for some important agricultural or forest insect pest.
