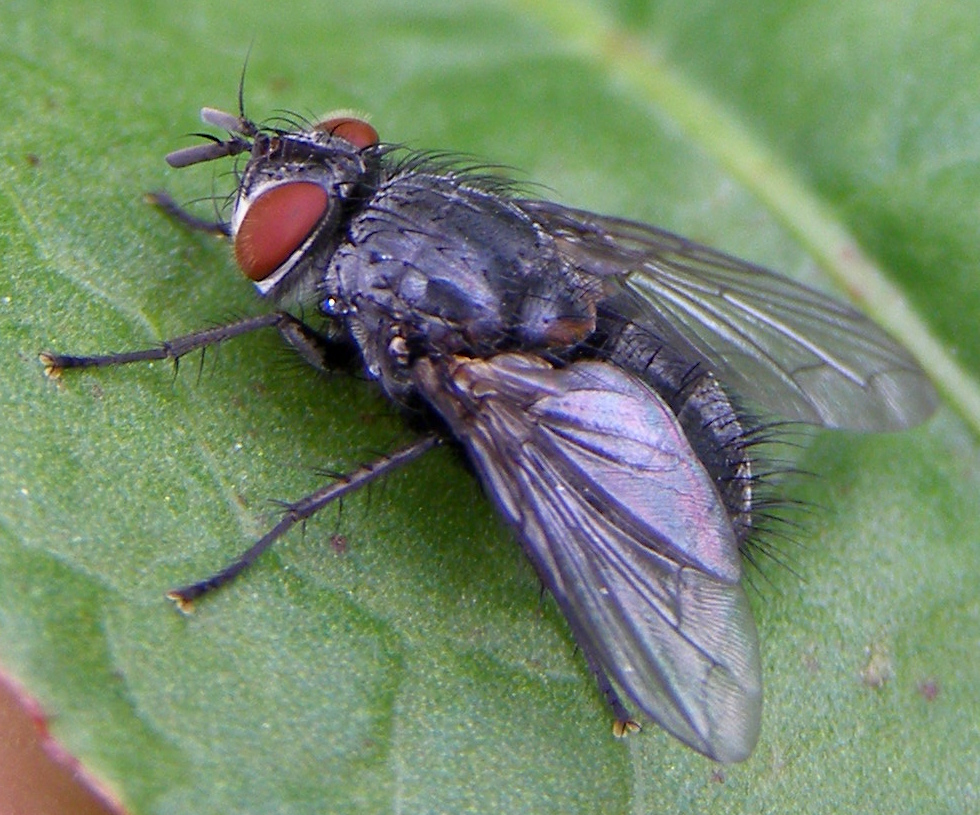
- Female Pales pavida

Scientific classification
- Kingdom: Animalia
- Phylum: Arthropoda
- Class: Insecta
- Order: Diptera
- Family: Tachinidae
- Subfamily: Exoristinae
- Tribe: Goniini
- Genus: Pales
- Species: P. pavida

Binomial name
- Pales pavida (Meigen, 1824)

Synonyms
- Tachina pavida Meigen, 1824; Gaedia ignavus Nishikawa, 1930; Gaedia puellae Nishikawa, 1930; Pales caerulescens Robineau-Desvoidy, 1863; Pales florea Robineau-Desvoidy, 1830; Pales petrosa Robineau-Desvoidy, 1830; Pales vernalis Robineau-Desvoidy, 1830; Phorocera aestuans Meigen, 1838; Phorocera cilipeda Rondani, 1859; Tachina infensans Walker, 1853; Tachina internexa Walker, 1853; Tachina squamosa Zetterstedt, 1844

= Pales pavida =

Species of fly

Pales pavida is a species of bristle fly in the family Tachinidae.

== Distribution ==
Turkmenistan, British Isles, Czech Republic, Estonia, Hungary, Lithuania, Moldova, Poland, Romania, Slovakia, Ukraine, Denmark, Finland, Norway, Sweden, Andorra, Bosnia and Herzegovina, Bulgaria, Corsica, Croatia, Greece, Italy, Macedonia, Montenegro, Portugal, Serbia, Slovenia, Spain, Turkey, Austria, Belgium, France, Germany, Netherlands, Switzerland, Japan, Kazakhstan, Iran, Israel, Mongolia, Morocco, Russia, Armenia, Azerbaijan, Georgia, China, Japan.
