= Macromya =

Scientific classification
- Kingdom: Animalia
- Phylum: Arthropoda
- Clade: Pancrustacea
- Class: Insecta
- Order: Diptera
- Family: Tachinidae
- Subfamily: Tachininae
- Tribe: Nemoraeini
- Genus: Macromya; Robineau-Desvoidy, 1830

Type species
- Macromya depressa Robineau-Desvoidy, 1830

Synonyms
- Gymnostilia Bigot, 1885; Gymnostilina Schiner, 1861; Gymnostylia Macquart, 1835; Macromyia Agassiz, 1846; Macromyia Macquart, 1835; Tropidopsis Brauer & von Berganstamm, 1889; Xanthohystricia Townsend, 1931

Genus of flies

Macromya is a genus of flies in the family Tachinidae.

== Species ==
- Macromya anthemon (Walker, 1849)
- Macromya ciniscula Reinhard, 1968
- Macromya connectans (Townsend, 1912)
- Macromya crocata Reinhard, 1968
- Macromya depressa Robineau-Desvoidy, 1830
- Macromya lucens Reinhard, 1968
- Macromya pyrrhaspis (Wiedemann, 1830)
