= Lasiopalpus =

Scientific classification
- Kingdom: Animalia
- Phylum: Arthropoda
- Class: Insecta
- Order: Diptera
- Family: Tachinidae
- Subfamily: Tachininae
- Tribe: Nemoraeini
- Genus: Lasiopalpus; Macquart, 1847

Type species
- Lasiopalpus flavitarsis Macquart, 1847

Genus of flies

Lasiopalpus is a genus of flies in the family Tachinidae.

== Species ==
- Lasiopalpus flavitarsis Macquart, 1847

== Distribution ==
Venezuela
