= Hyphantria orizaba =

Scientific classification
- Domain: Eukaryota
- Kingdom: Animalia
- Phylum: Arthropoda
- Class: Insecta
- Order: Lepidoptera
- Superfamily: Noctuoidea
- Family: Erebidae
- Subfamily: Arctiinae
- Genus: Hyphantria
- Species: H. orizaba

Binomial name
- Hyphantria orizaba (H. Druce, 1897)

Synonyms
- Spilosoma orizaba H. Druce, 1897

Species of moth

Hyphantria orizaba is a moth of the family Erebidae. It was described by Herbert Druce in 1897. It is found in Mexico.
