= Calohystricia =

Scientific classification
- Kingdom: Animalia
- Phylum: Arthropoda
- Class: Insecta
- Order: Diptera
- Family: Tachinidae
- Subfamily: Tachininae
- Tribe: Nemoraeini
- Genus: Calohystricia; Townsend, 1931

Type species
- Hystricia velutina Wulp, 1888

Genus of flies

Calohystricia is a genus of flies in the tachinid family.

== Species ==
- Calohystricia albosignata (Wulp, 1892)
- Calohystricia gerstchi (Curran, 1942)
- Calohystricia velutina (Wulp, 1888)
