= Hystriomyia =

Scientific classification
- Kingdom: Animalia
- Phylum: Arthropoda
- Class: Insecta
- Order: Diptera
- Family: Tachinidae
- Subfamily: Tachininae
- Tribe: Nemoraeini
- Genus: Hystriomyia; Portschinsky, 1881

Type species
- Hystriomyia fetissowi Portschinsky, 1881

Synonyms
- Belohystriomyia Zimin, 1935; Innshanotroxis Townsend, 1932

Genus of flies

Hystriomyia is a genus of flies in the family Tachinidae.

== Species ==
- Hystriomyia fetissowi Portschinsky, 1881
- Hystriomyia lata Portschinsky, 1882
- Hystriomyia leucochaeta Zimin, 1983
- Hystriomyia nigrosetosa Zimin, 1931
- Hystriomyia pallida Chao, 1974
- Hystriomyia paradoxa (Zimin, 1935)
- Hystriomyia rubra Chao, 1974
- Hystriomyia valentinae Zimin, 1983
