= Xylocamptomima =

Scientific classification
- Kingdom: Animalia
- Phylum: Arthropoda
- Class: Insecta
- Order: Diptera
- Family: Tachinidae
- Subfamily: Tachininae
- Tribe: Nemoraeini
- Genus: Xylocamptomima; Townsend, 1927

Type species
- Xylocamptomima oculata Townsend, 1927

Genus of flies

Xylocamptomima is a genus of flies in the family Tachinidae.

== Species ==
- Xylocamptomima usta (Wiedemann, 1830)

== Distribution ==
Brazil
