= Hyphantria panoezys =

Scientific classification
- Domain: Eukaryota
- Kingdom: Animalia
- Phylum: Arthropoda
- Class: Insecta
- Order: Lepidoptera
- Superfamily: Noctuoidea
- Family: Erebidae
- Subfamily: Arctiinae
- Genus: Hyphantria
- Species: H. panoezys

Binomial name
- Hyphantria panoezys (Dyar, 1916)

Synonyms
- Turuptiana panoezys Dyar, 1916

Species of moth

Hyphantria panoezys is a moth of the family Erebidae. It was described by Harrison Gray Dyar Jr. in 1916. It is found in Mexico.
