= Xanthophyto =

Scientific classification
- Kingdom: Animalia
- Phylum: Arthropoda
- Class: Insecta
- Order: Diptera
- Family: Tachinidae
- Subfamily: Tachininae
- Tribe: Nemoraeini
- Genus: Xanthophyto; Townsend, 1916

Type species
- Nemoraea labis Coquillett, 1895

Synonyms
- Xanthoernestia Townsend, 1926

Genus of flies

Xanthophyto is a genus of flies in the family Tachinidae.

== Species ==
- Xanthophyto antennalis (Townsend, 1926)
- Xanthophyto erythropyga (Wulp, 1882)
- Xanthophyto labis (Coquillett, 1895)
- Xanthophyto versicolor (Wulp, 1890)
