= Ceromasiopsis =

Scientific classification
- Kingdom: Animalia
- Phylum: Arthropoda
- Clade: Pancrustacea
- Class: Insecta
- Order: Diptera
- Family: Tachinidae
- Subfamily: Tachininae
- Tribe: Nemoraeini
- Genus: Ceromasiopsis; Townsend, 1927

Type species
- Ceromasiopsis brasiliensis Townsend, 1927

Genus of flies

Ceromasiopsis is a genus of flies in the family Tachinidae.

== Species ==
- Ceromasiopsis brasiliensis Townsend, 1927

== Distribution ==
They are found in Brazil.
