= Lasiona (fly) =

Scientific classification
- Kingdom: Animalia
- Phylum: Arthropoda
- Class: Insecta
- Order: Diptera
- Family: Tachinidae
- Subfamily: Tachininae
- Tribe: Nemoraeini
- Genus: Lasiona; Wulp, 1890

Type species
- Lasiona multisetosa Wulp, 1890

Genus of flies

Lasiona is a genus of flies in the family Tachinidae.

== Species ==
- Lasiona multisetosa Wulp, 1890

== Distribution ==
Venezuela
