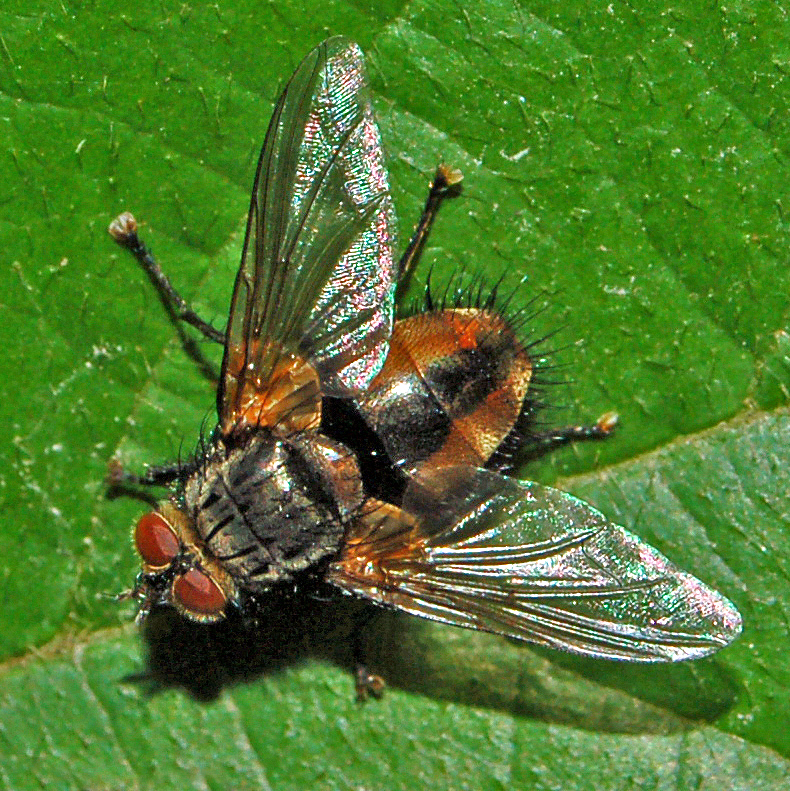
- Nemoraea pellucida

Scientific classification
- Kingdom: Animalia
- Phylum: Arthropoda
- Class: Insecta
- Order: Diptera
- Family: Tachinidae
- Subfamily: Tachininae
- Tribe: Nemoraeini
- Genus: Nemoraea; Robineau-Desvoidy, 1830

Synonyms
- Chaetolydella Villeneuve, 1916; Dexiomima Brauer & von Berganstamm, 1894; Hypotachina Brauer & von Berganstamm, 1891; Kinabaluia Malloch, 1935; Nemora Am Stein, 1857; Nemorea Macquart, 1834; Nemoroea Macquart, 1851; Oxyrutilia Townsend, 1926; Prohypotachina Townsend, 1933; Protonemoraea Baranov, 1935

= Nemoraea =

Genus of flies

Nemoraea is a genus of flies in the family Tachinidae.

== Species ==
- Nemoraea angustecarinata (Macquart, 1848)
- Nemoraea bequaerti Emden, 1960
- Nemoraea bifurca (Chao & Shi, 1982)
- Nemoraea bipartita Malloch, 1935
- Nemoraea capensis (Robineau-Desvoidy, 1830)
- Nemoraea chrysophora (Wiedemann, 1830)
- Nemoraea discoidalis Villeneuve, 1916
- Nemoraea dotata (Walker, 1859)
- Nemoraea echinata Mesnil, 1953
- Nemoraea elegantula Mesnil, 1957
- Nemoraea fasciata (Chao & Shi, 1985)
- Nemoraea fenestrata (Mesnil, 1971)
- Nemoraea fortuna Curran, 1936
- Nemoraea infoederata Villeneuve, 1916
- Nemoraea intacta Villeneuve, 1916
- Nemoraea japonica (Baranov, 1935)
- Nemoraea javana (Brauer & von Berganstamm, 1894)
- Nemoraea longicornis Villeneuve, 1916
- Nemoraea mendax (Mesnil, 1978)
- Nemoraea metallica Shima, 1979
- Nemoraea mira (Mesnil, 1978)
- Nemoraea miranda Villeneuve, 1916
- Nemoraea moerens Villeneuve, 1916
- Nemoraea mutata Villeneuve, 1916
- Nemoraea natalensis (Villeneuve, 1916)
- Nemoraea nigra (Bigot, 1859)
- Nemoraea ornata (Bigot, 1889)
- Nemoraea paulla (Mesnil, 1978)
- Nemoraea pellucida (Meigen, 1824)
- Nemoraea piligena Mesnil, 1971
- Nemoraea rubellana Villeneuve, 1913
- Nemoraea rutilioides (Townsend, 1933)
- Nemoraea sapporensis Kocha, 1969
- Nemoraea semiobscura Villeneuve, 1916
- Nemoraea takanoi (Baranov, 1935)
- Nemoraea titan (Walker, 1849)
- Nemoraea triangulata Villeneuve, 1937
- Nemoraea viridifulva (Malloch, 1935)
- Nemoraea vulgata (Mesnil, 1978)
- Nemoraea watanabei Kocha, 1969
