= Hypotachina =

Scientific classification
- Kingdom: Animalia
- Phylum: Arthropoda
- Class: Insecta
- Order: Diptera
- Family: Tachinidae
- Subfamily: Tachininae
- Tribe: Nemoraeini
- Genus: Hypotachina; Brauer & von Bergenstamm, 1891

Type species
- Hypotachina disparata Brauer & von Bergenstamm, 1891

Synonyms
- Phyllolabella Townsend, 1919

Genus of flies

Hypotachina is a genus of flies in the family Tachinidae. It is monotypic, the sole species being Hypotachina chrysophora Wiedemann, 1830.

== Distribution ==
Hypotachina chrysophora occurs in South and Central America and in the Caribbean, specifically in Brazil, Peru, Venezuela, Costa Rica, and Trinidad & Tobago.
