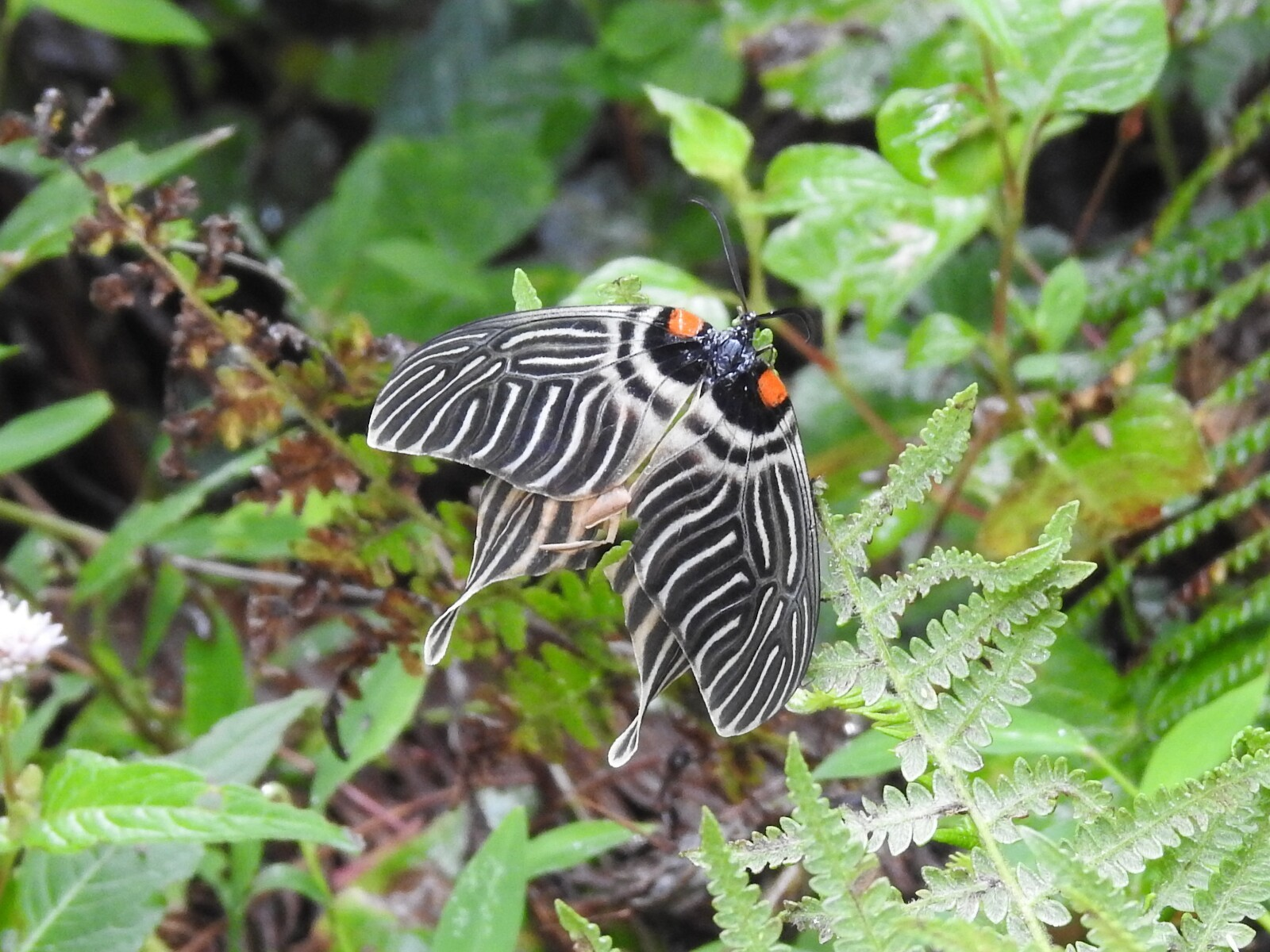

Scientific classification
- Domain: Eukaryota
- Kingdom: Animalia
- Phylum: Arthropoda
- Class: Insecta
- Order: Lepidoptera
- Family: Zygaenidae
- Genus: Elcysma
- Species: E. ziroensis

Binomial name
- Elcysma ziroensis (P. Chada, M. J. Gogoi & J. J. Young, 2017)

= Elcysma ziroensis =

Apatani glory

Moth species

Elcysma ziroensis, the Apatani glory, is a moth of the family Zygaenidae. The species was first described by Punyo Chada, Monsoon Jyoti Gogoi and James John Young in 2017. It is endemic to the Arunachal Pradesh, India.
