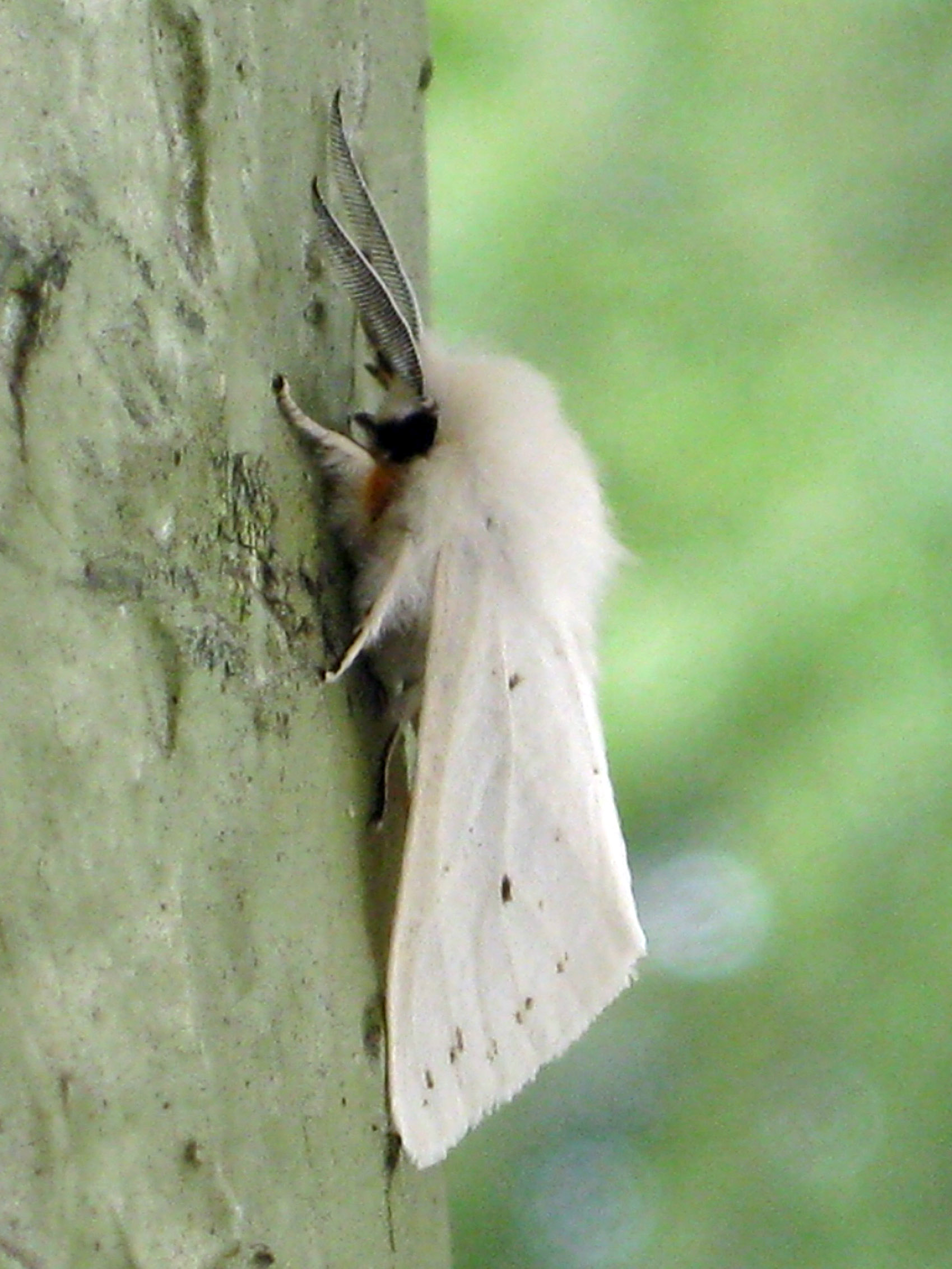
- Hyphantria cunea

Scientific classification
- Domain: Eukaryota
- Kingdom: Animalia
- Phylum: Arthropoda
- Class: Insecta
- Order: Lepidoptera
- Superfamily: Noctuoidea
- Family: Erebidae
- Subfamily: Arctiinae
- Subtribe: Spilosomina
- Genus: Hyphantria; Harris, 1841

Type species
- Hyphantria textor Harris, 1841

= Hyphantria =

Genus of moths

Hyphantria is a genus of tiger moths in the family Erebidae. The genus was erected by Thaddeus William Harris in 1841. The moths are primarily found in North and Central America. One species, Hyphantria cunea, was introduced in Eurasia.

== Species ==
- Hyphantria cunea (Drury, 1773)
- Hyphantria orizaba (Druce, 1897)
- Hyphantria panoezys (Dyar, 1916)
- Hyphantria penthetria Dyar, 1912
- Hyphantria pictipupa Fitch, 1857
