= Hyphantria pictipupa =

Scientific classification
- Domain: Eukaryota
- Kingdom: Animalia
- Phylum: Arthropoda
- Class: Insecta
- Order: Lepidoptera
- Superfamily: Noctuoidea
- Family: Erebidae
- Subfamily: Arctiinae
- Genus: Hyphantria
- Species: H. pictipupa

Binomial name
- Hyphantria pictipupa Fitch, 1857

Species of moth

Hyphantria pictipupa is a moth of the family Erebidae. It was described by Asa Fitch in 1857. It is found in Brazil.
