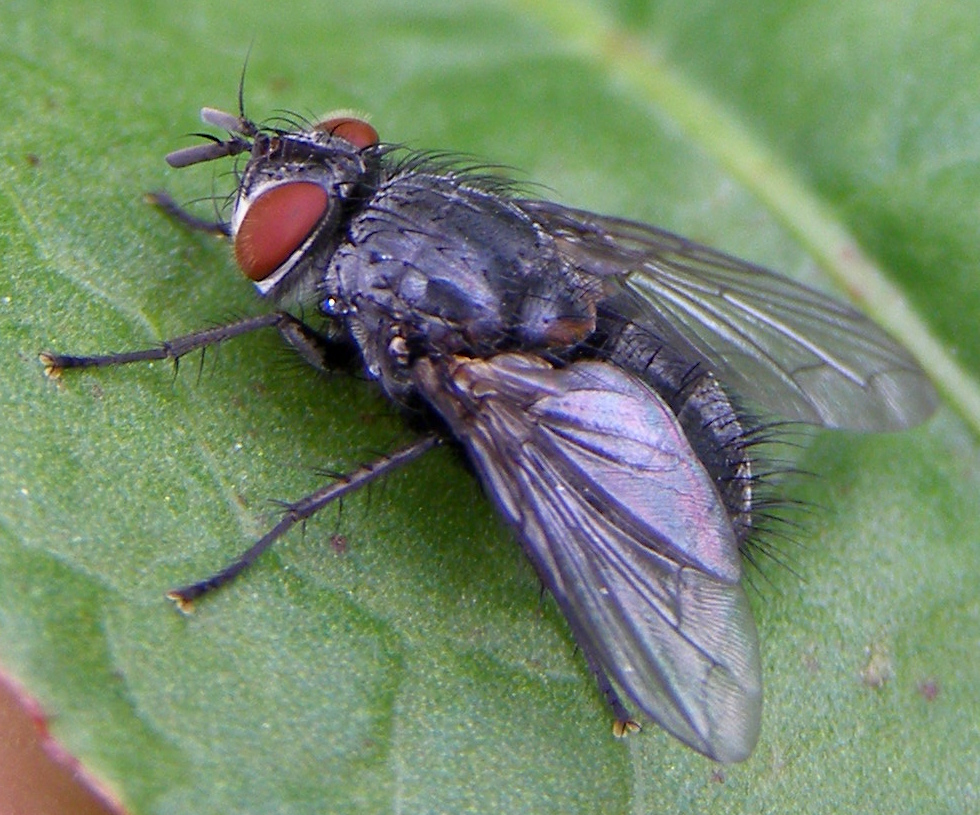
- Female Pales pavida

Scientific classification
- Kingdom: Animalia
- Phylum: Arthropoda
- Class: Insecta
- Order: Diptera
- Family: Tachinidae
- Subfamily: Exoristinae
- Tribe: Goniini
- Genus: Pales; Robineau-Desvoidy, 1830

Type species
- Pales florea Robineau-Desvoidy, 1830

Synonyms
- Cerosomyia Hutton, 1901; Ctenophoraria Gunn, 1925; Ctenophorocera Brauer & von Berganstamm, 1891; Macrozenillia Townsend, 1927; Micropales Villeneuve, 1927; Myiofijia Baranov, 1934; Neopales Coquillett, 1910

= Pales (fly) =

Genus of flies

Pales is a genus of flies in the family Tachinidae.

== Species ==
- Pales abdita Cerretti, 2005
- Pales aethiopica (Mesnil, 1950)
- Pales angustifrons (Mesnil, 1963)
- Pales atrox (Hutton, 1901)
- Pales aurea (Hutton, 1903)
- Pales aurescens (Townsend, 1927)
- Pales basitincta (Walker, 1860)
- Pales bezziana (Baranov, 1934)
- Pales blepharipa (Brauer & von Berganstamm, 1891)
- Pales brouni (Hutton, 1903)
- Pales carbonata Mesnil, 1970
- Pales casta (Hutton, 1903)
- Pales coerulea (Jaennicke, 1867)
- Pales coeruleonigra (Mesnil, 1950)
- Pales contristans Villeneuve, 1938
- Pales corrupta (Curran, 1927)
- Pales coxalis (Mesnil, 1963)
- Pales cuthbertsoni (Curran, 1940)
- Pales cyanea (Macquart, 1839)
- Pales divergens (Curran, 1928)
- Pales efferata (Hutton, 1901)
- Pales epiphallops (Lehrer, 2013)
- Pales exitiosa (Hutton, 1903)
- Pales experta (Brauer & von Berganstamm, 1891)
- Pales exsulans Tiensuu, 1939
- Pales feredayi (Hutton, 1881)
- Pales funesta (Hutton, 1901)
- Pales gnu (Curran, 1940)
- Pales inconspicua (Hutton, 1903)
- Pales javana (Macquart, 1851)
- Pales latifrons Kugler, 1980
- Pales longicornis Chao & Shi, 1982
- Pales macrocephala (Mesnil, 1950)
- Pales maculisquama (Mesnil, 1950)
- Pales marae Cerretti, 2005
- Pales marginata (Hutton, 1881)
- Pales medogensis Chao & Shi, 1982
- Pales metro (Curran, 1940)
- Pales murina Mesnil, 1970
- Pales nefaria (Hutton, 1901)
- Pales nigronitens Villeneuve, 1938
- Pales nyasa (Curran, 1940)
- Pales nyctemeriana (Hudson, 1883)
- Pales opulenta Herting, 1980
- Pales pauciseta (Mesnil, 1950)
- Pales pavida (Meigen, 1824)
- Pales peregrina Herting, 1975
- Pales perniciosa (Hutton, 1901)
- Pales poecilochaeta (Bezzi, 1928)
- Pales processioneae (Ratzeburg, 1840)
- Pales pumicata (Meigen, 1824)
- Pales rubrica Villeneuve, 1932
- Pales rubriventris Bezzi, 1908
- Pales ruficauda (Curran, 1927)
- Pales rufolateralis (Curran, 1940)
- Pales sarcophagaeformis (Jaennicke, 1867)
- Pales seminitida (Villeneuve, 1927)
- Pales senex (Curran, 1927)
- Pales setigena (Curran, 1940)
- Pales somomyina (Karsch, 1886)
- Pales splendens Mesnil, 1970
- Pales tamilensis Shima, 1994
- Pales tecta (Hutton, 1903)
- Pales tessellans (Mesnil, 1950)
- Pales tetra (Curran, 1940)
- Pales townsendi (Baranov, 1935)
- Pales usitata (Hutton, 1901)
- Pales violacea (Mesnil, 1953)
