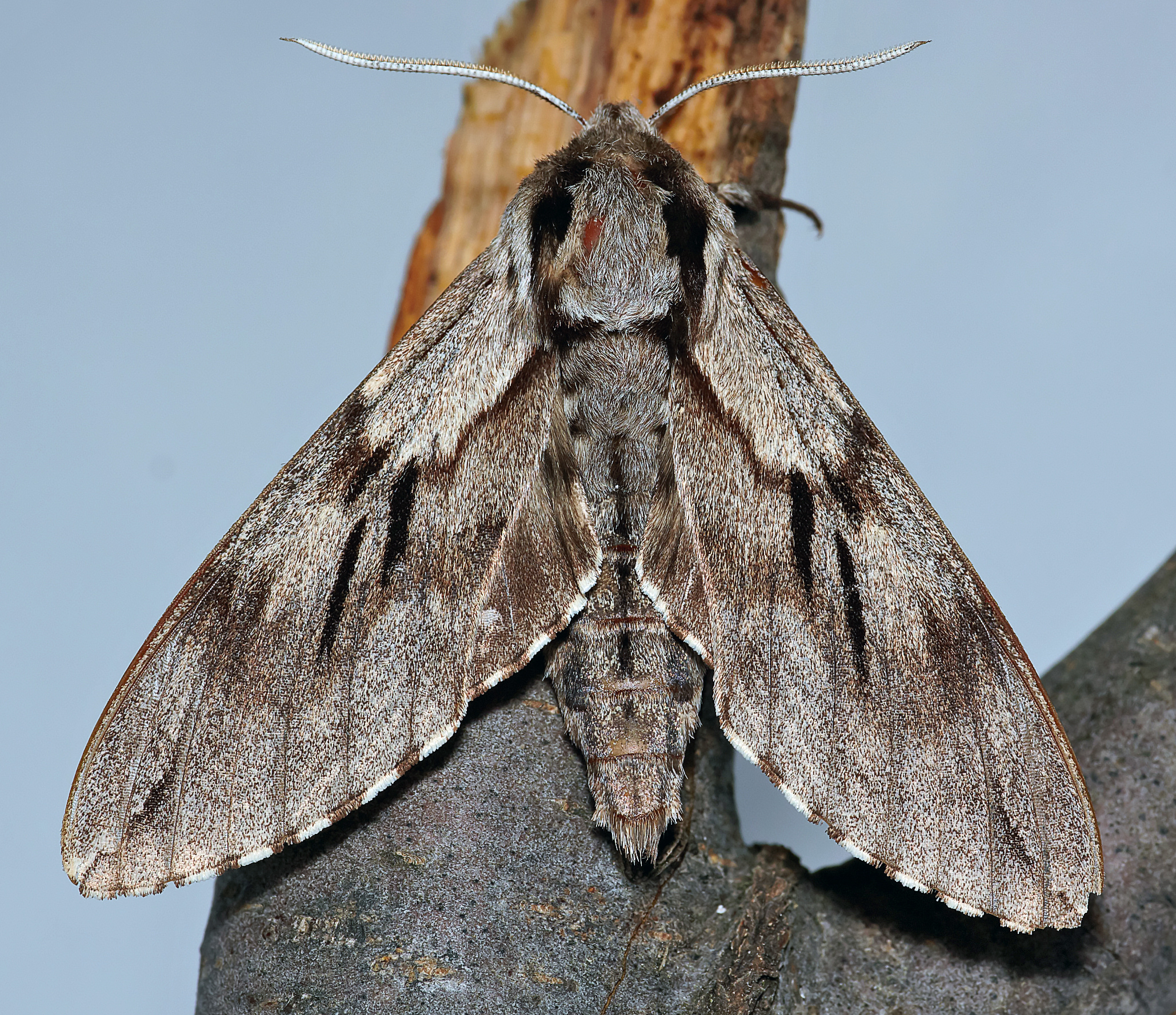

Scientific classification
- Kingdom: Animalia
- Phylum: Arthropoda
- Clade: Pancrustacea
- Class: Insecta
- Order: Lepidoptera
- Family: Sphingidae
- Genus: Sphinx
- Species: S. pinastri

Binomial name
- Sphinx pinastri Linnaeus, 1758

Synonyms
- Hyloicus pinastri Linnaeus, 1758; Hyloicus asiaticus Butler, 1875; Sphinx saniptri Strecker, 1876; Hyloicus selon de Freina & Witt, 1987; Hyloicus pinastri albescens Cockayne, 1926; Hyloicus pinastri albicans Austaut, 1907; Hyloicus pinastri albicolor Cockayne, 1926; Hyloicus pinastri bicolor (Lempke, 1959); Hyloicus pinastri cenisius Jordan, 1931; Hyloicus pinastri cingulata (Lempke, 1964); Hyloicus pinastri euxinus Derzhavets, 1979; Hyloicus pinastri grisea-distincta Tutt, 1904; Hyloicus pinastri grisea-mediopunctata Tutt, 1904; Hyloicus pinastri grisea-transversa Tutt, 1904; Hyloicus pinastri grisea Tutt, 1904; Hyloicus pinastri medialis Jordan, 1931; Hyloicus pinastri nigrescens (Lempke, 1959); Hyloicus pinastri rubida Cabeau, 1925; Hyloicus pinastri semilugens (Andreas, 1925); Hyloicus pinastri typica-virgata Tutt, 1904; Hyloicus pinastri unicolor Tutt, 1904; Hyloicus pinastri virgata Tutt, 1904; Sphinx pinastri albescens Schnaider, 1950; Sphinx pinastri brunnea Spuler, 1903; Sphinx pinastri fasciata Lampa, 1885; Sphinx pinastri ferrea (Closs, 1920); Sphinx pinastri fuliginosa Lambillion, 1907; Sphinx pinastri minor Stephan, 1924; Sphinx pinastri stehri Stephan, 1926; Sphinx pinastri vittata Closs, 1920

= Sphinx pinastri =

Pine hawk-moth

Species of moth

Sphinx pinastri, the pine hawk-moth, is a moth of the family Sphingidae. It is found in Palearctic realm and sometimes the Nearctic realm. This species has been found in Scotland but is usually found in England. The species was first described by Carl Linnaeus in his 1758 10th edition of Systema Naturae.

The larvae feed on Scots pine, Swiss pine, Siberian pine and Norway spruce.

== Description ==
The wings of Sphinx pinastri are grey with black dashes. The wingspan is 2 3/4–3 1/2 inches (70–89 mm). The moth flies from April to August depending on the location.

The back of the thorax is grey with two dark bands around both sides.

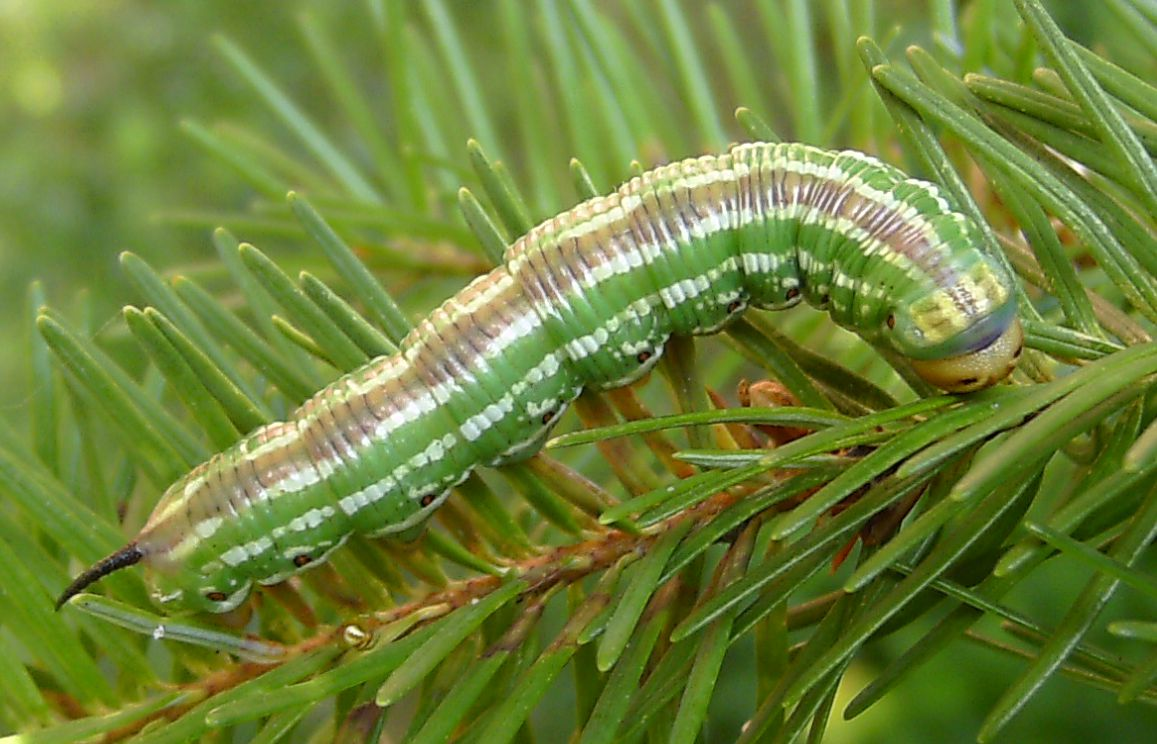
Adult caterpillar

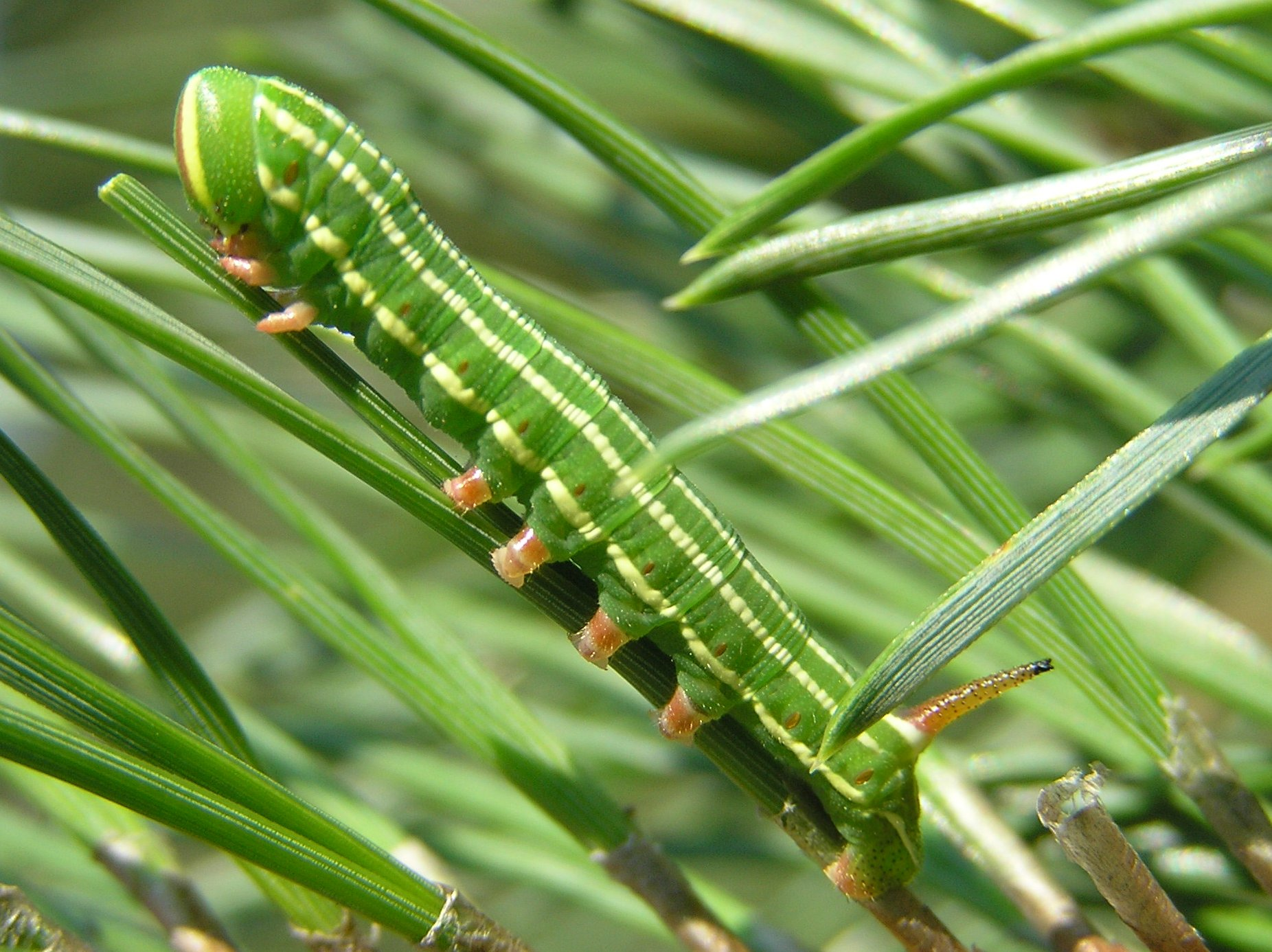
Caterpillar

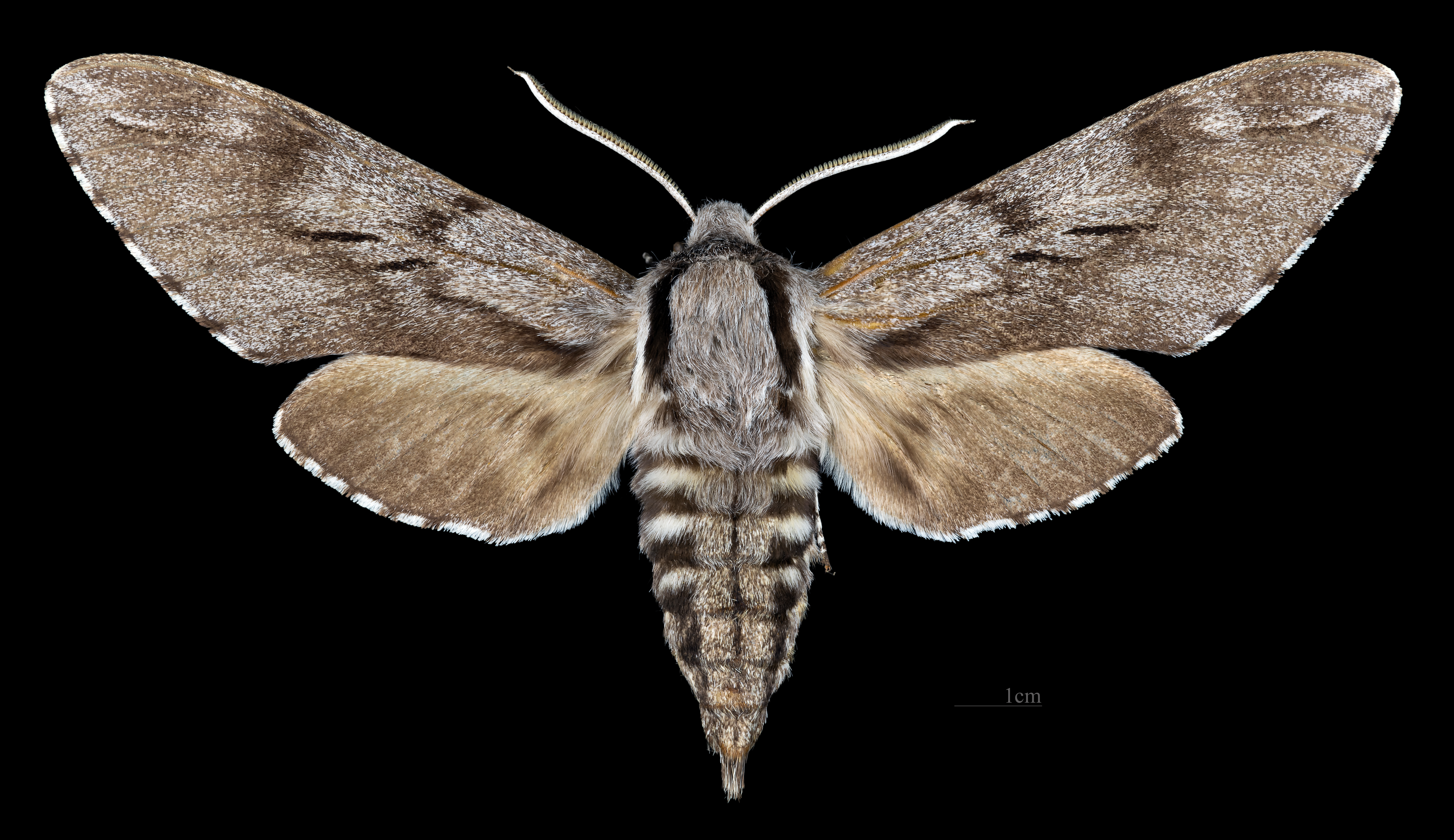
Male

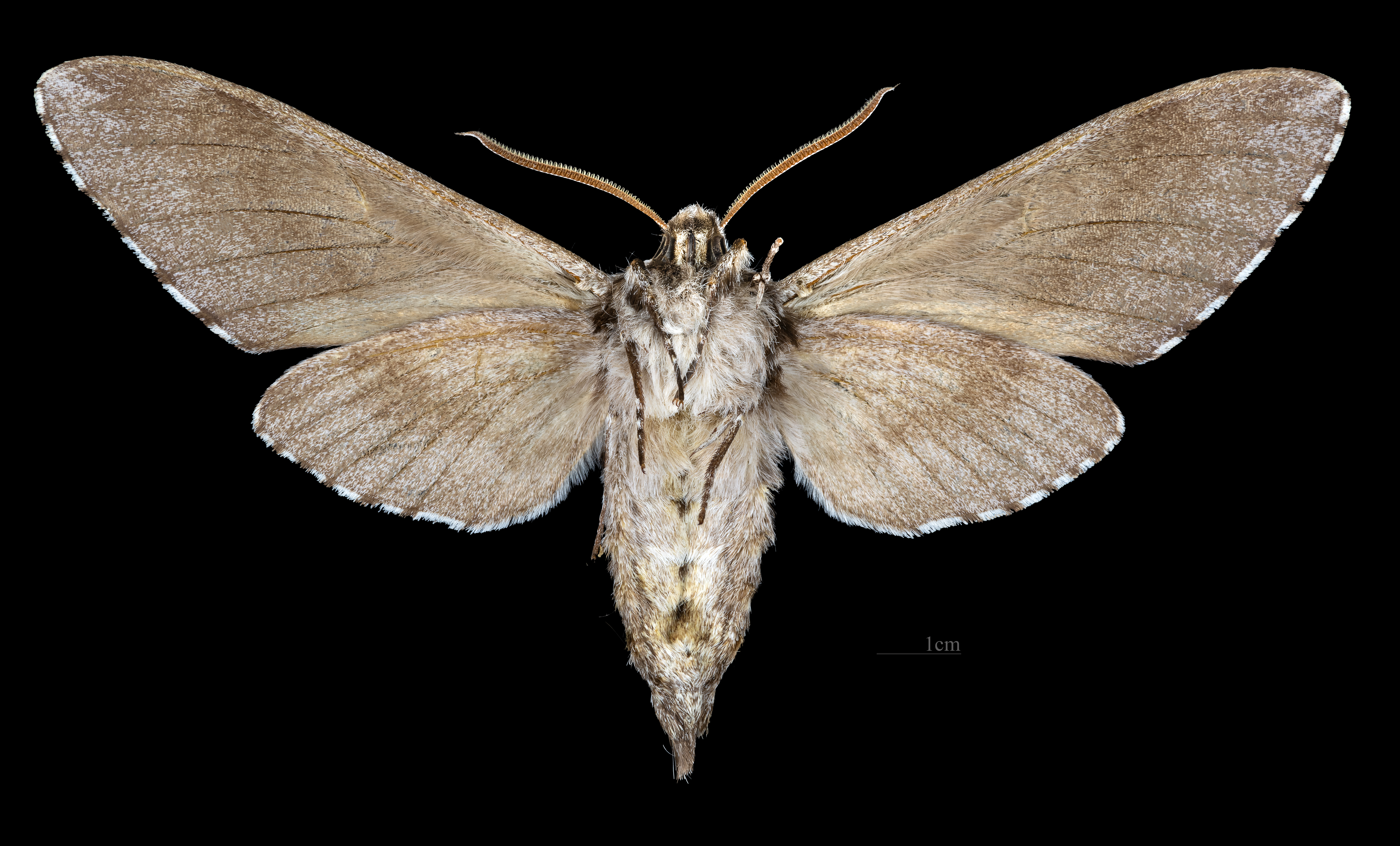
Male underside

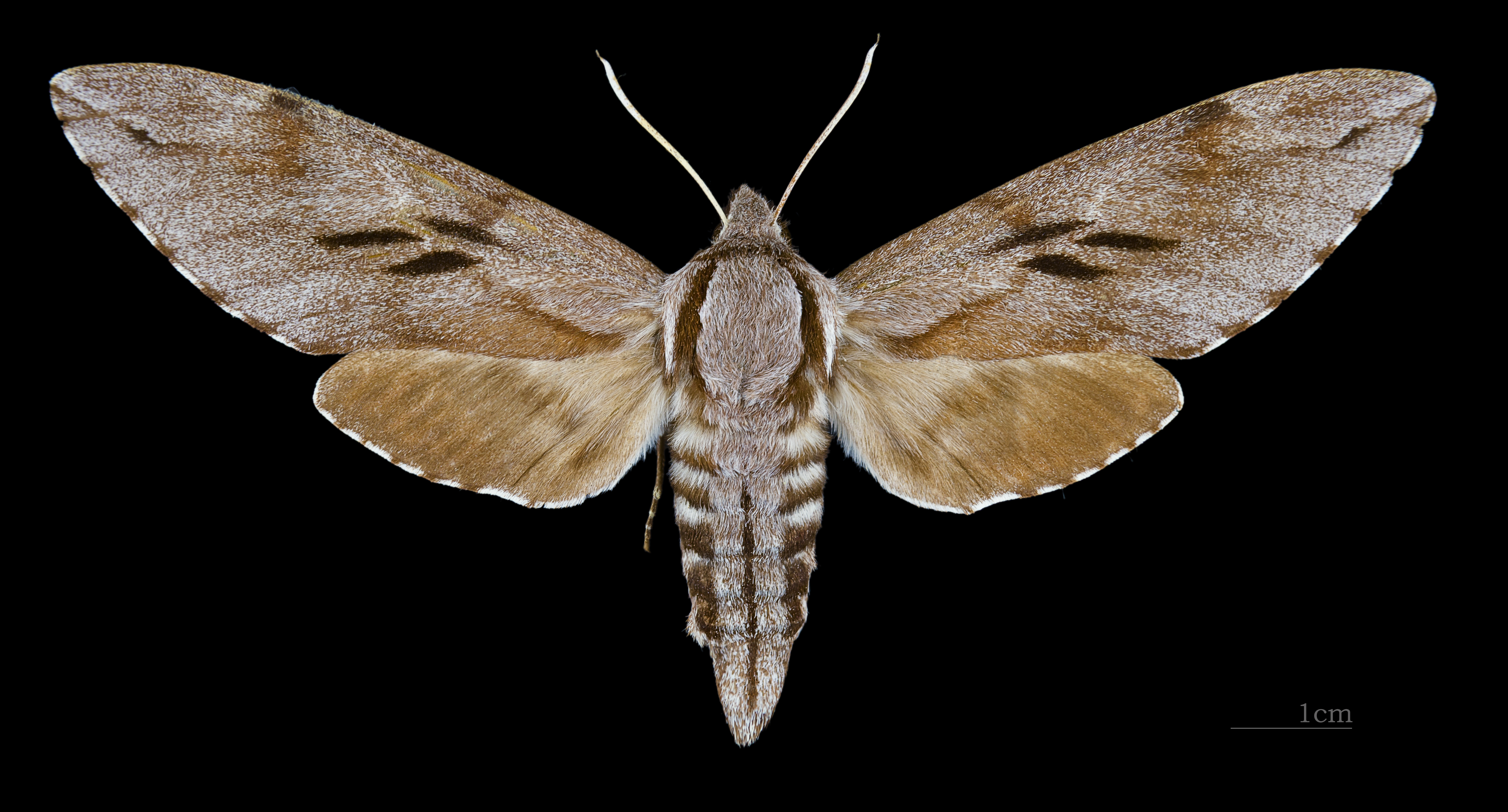
Female

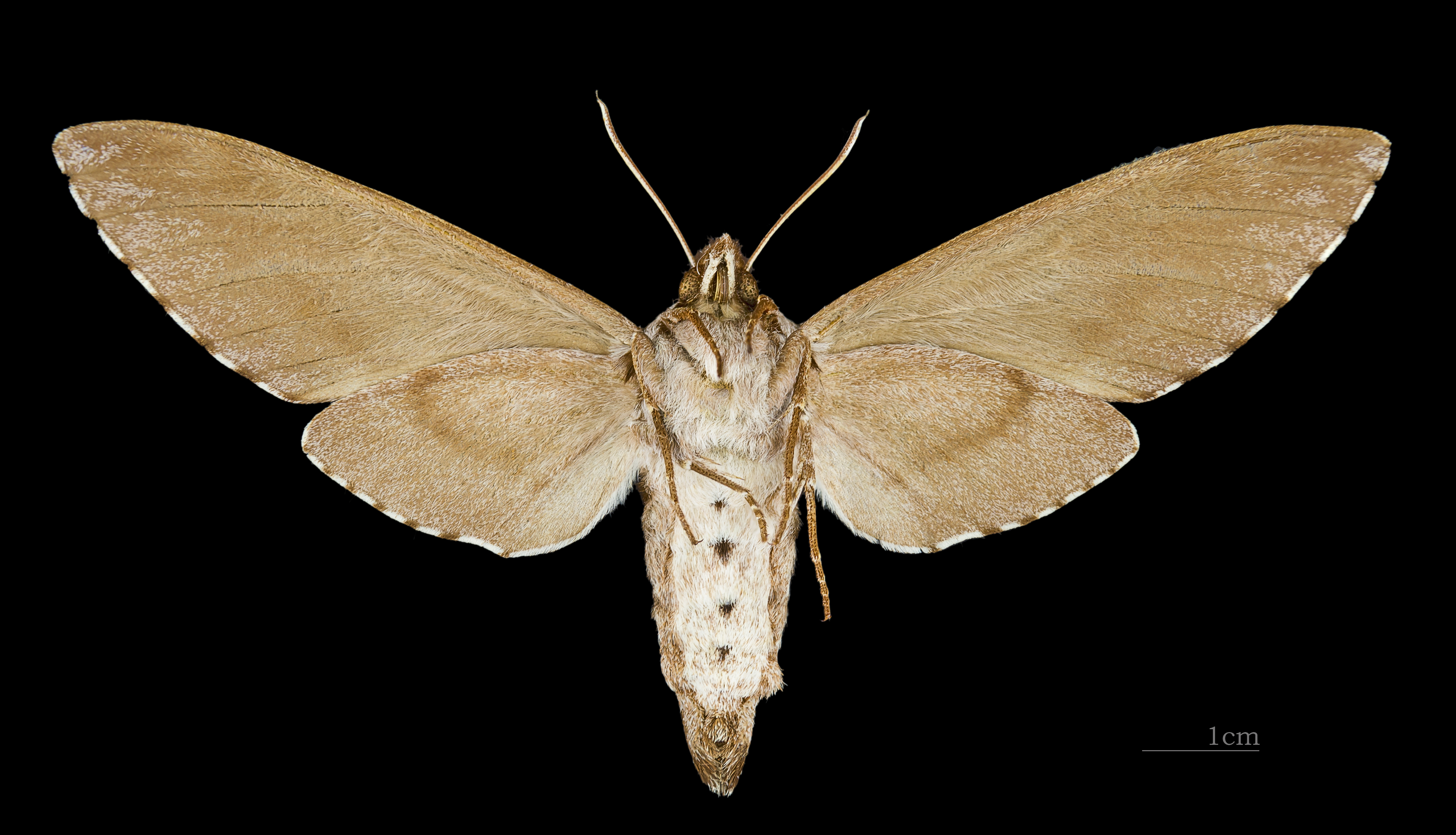
Female underside

== Life cycle ==
The females lay their eggs in groups of two or three along pine or spruce needles.
