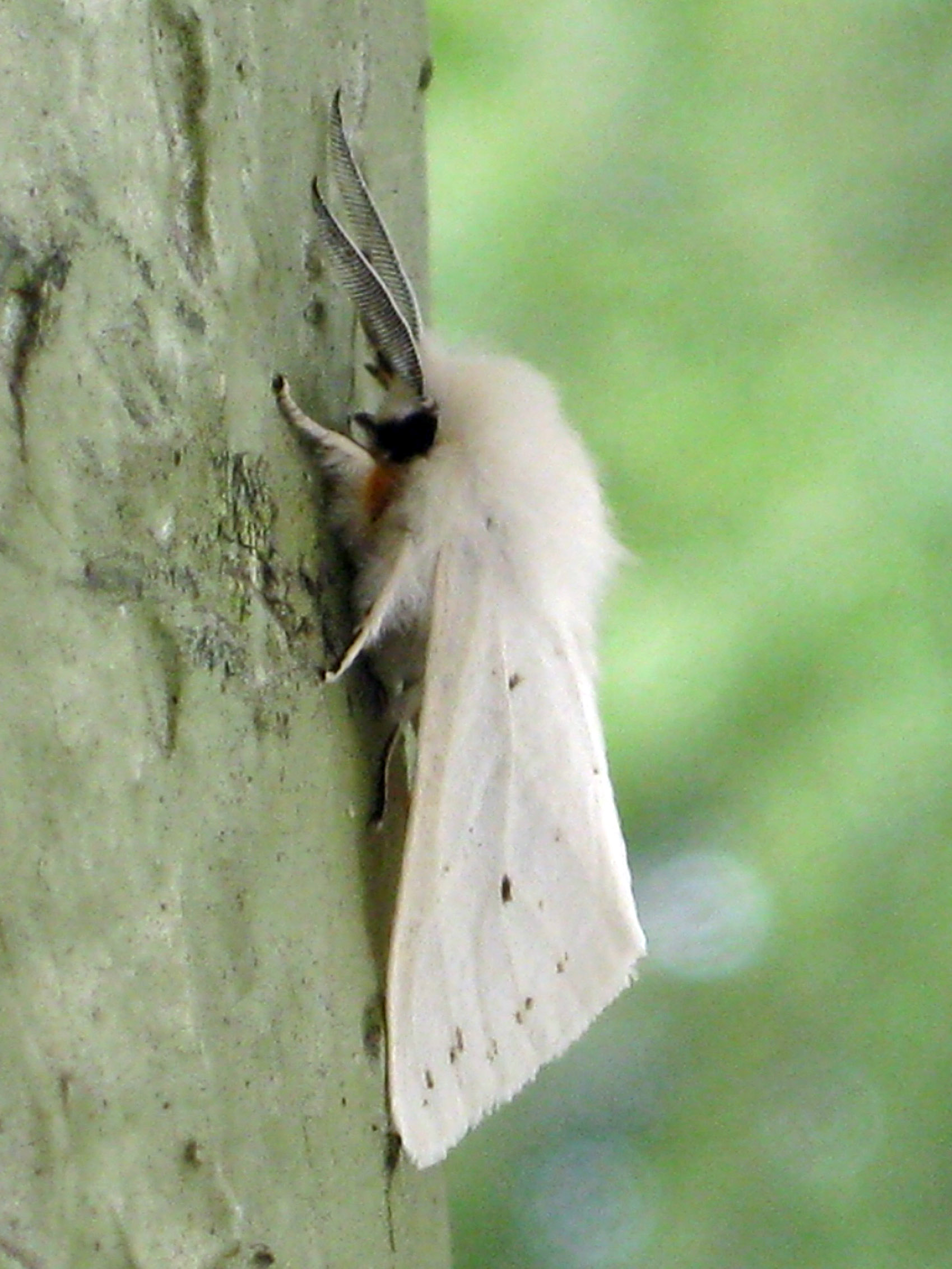

Scientific classification
- Kingdom: Animalia
- Phylum: Arthropoda
- Class: Insecta
- Order: Lepidoptera
- Superfamily: Noctuoidea
- Family: Erebidae
- Subfamily: Arctiinae
- Genus: Hyphantria
- Species: H. cunea

Binomial name
- Hyphantria cunea (Drury, 1773)

Synonyms
- Phalaena cunea Drury, 1773; Phalaena liturata Goeze, 1781; Phalaena punctatissima Smith, 1797; Cycnia budea Hübner, 1823; Arctia textor Harris, 1823; Hyphantria textor Harris, 1841; Spilosoma mutans Walker, 1856; Hyphantria punctata Fitch, 1857; Hyphantria pallida Packard, 1864; Spilosoma candida Walker, [1865]; Hyphantria suffusa Strecker, 1900; Hyphantria brunnea Strecker, 1900

= Fall webworm =

Species of moth

The fall webworm (Hyphantria cunea) is a moth in the family Erebidae known principally for its larval stage, which creates the characteristic webbed nests on the tree limbs of a wide variety of hardwoods in the late summer and fall. It is considered a pest but does not harm otherwise healthy trees. It is well known to commercial tree services and arboriculturists. Fall webworms are an invasive species in East Asia.

== Description ==
The adult fall webworm has a wingspan of approximately 30 mm and is generally white-colored, although some individuals may have dark-colored marks.

== Distribution ==
The moth is native to North America, ranging from Canada to Mexico and has been introduced into other continents. Introduced to what was formerly Yugoslavia in the 1940s (firstly recorded in 1949), it now has occupied probably its entire range in Europe from France to the Caspian Sea in the east as well as penetrated into Central Asia: Turkmenistan (from 1990 to 1993), Uzbekistan (Fergana valley from 1996 to 1997), Kyrgyzstan, and southeastern Kazakhstan. It was also introduced into Japan in 1945 and has adjusted its number of generations per year since its arrival. It spread into China, southern Mongolia, Korea and southern Primorsky Krai of Russia so that now it is considered holarctic in distribution.

== Life cycle ==
One generation per year emerges in the northern part of North America, with larvae appearing in late summer through early fall. South of an approximate latitude of 40°N there are two or more generations annually, with webs appearing progressively earlier further south. The second generation is most damaging in southeast Pennsylvania and Delaware and emerges between 791 and 1540 growing degree-days.

=== Eggs ===
The adult moth lays her eggs on the underside of leaves in 'hair'-covered clusters of a few hundred. Eggs hatch in about a week.

=== Larva ===
The caterpillars are highly variable in coloration, ranging from a pale yellow to dark grey, with yellow spots and long and short bristles. There are two cream stripes along the sides. The two races—one more common in the north, the other in the south—differ in head capsule coloration. The maximum length of larvae is 35 mm. Webs are progressively enlarged and much messier looking than those of tent caterpillars (which occur only in spring and have shorter hairs and very little yellow on their bodies); also, webs from the fall webworm are concentrated to the tips of the branches, whereas the tent caterpillar webs are largely found in the unions. Larvae feed inside the tents until the late instars. Very young larvae feed only on the upper surfaces of leaves; later, they consume whole leaves. The larval stage lasts about four to six weeks. Larvae are known to wiggle vigorously at periodic intervals in synchrony. How they synchronize these movements especially when distributed over a wide area has not been established.

=== Pupa ===
The pupa stage overwinters in the bark and leaf litter at the base of the trees. It is dark brown and about 10 mm long. The thin brown cocoon is made of silk with bits of detritus interwoven.

=== Adult ===
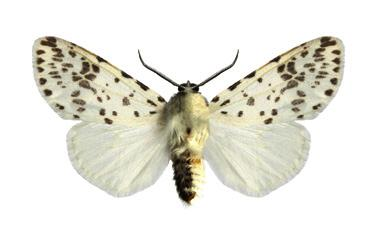
Male

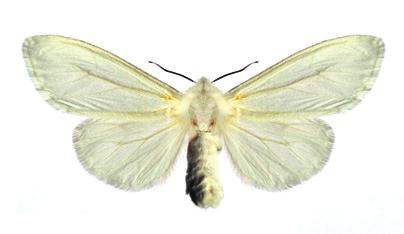
Female

The adult is mostly white in the North America regions, but in the south it may be marked with black or brown spots on the forewings. It is quite 'hairy' and the front legs have bright yellow or orange patches. The underwings will have less marking than the forewings, and the abdomen often has a sprinkling of brown hairs. It has a wingspan with a range of 35–42 mm.

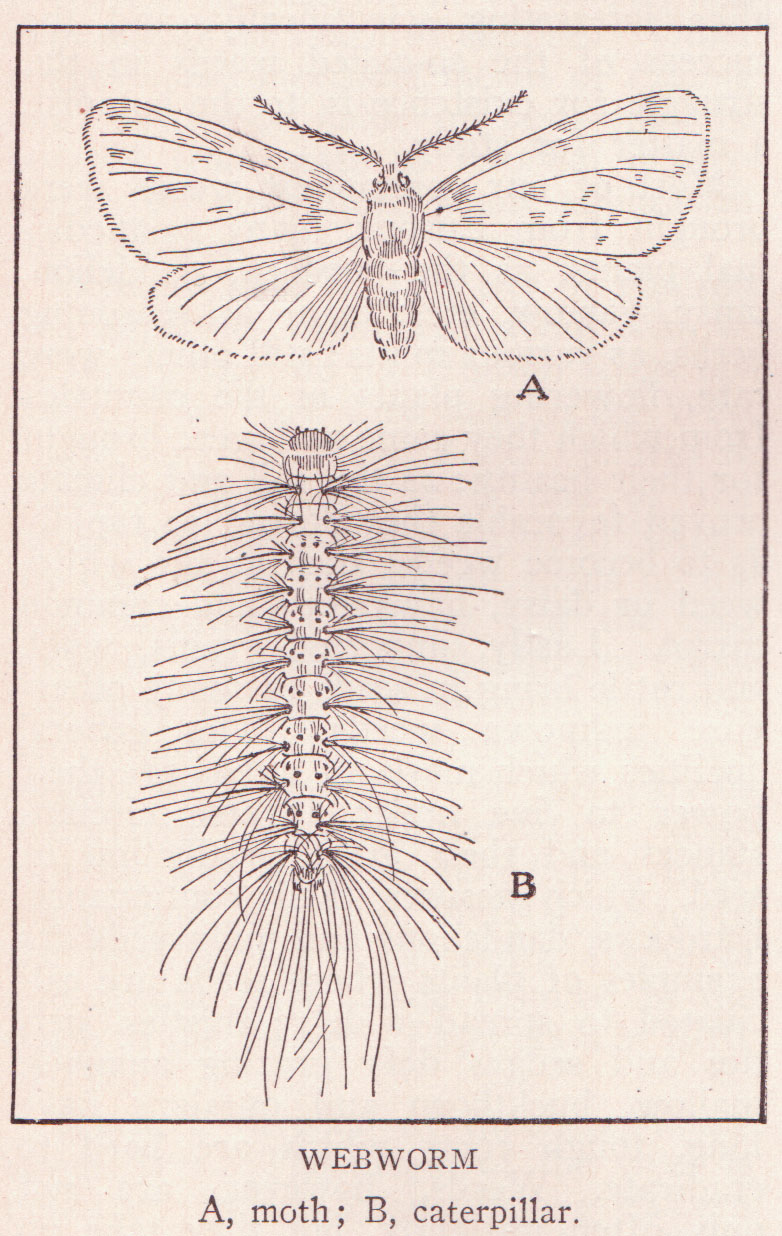
Illustration of webworm (1917)

== Food plants ==
Webworms moving in their nest

The fall webworm feeds on just about any type of deciduous tree, where leaves are chewed; branches or the entire tree may become defoliated. Worldwide, it has been recorded from 636 species, and it is considered to be among the most polyphagous of insects. In the eastern U.S., pecan trees (Carya illinoinensis), black walnut, American elm (Ulmus americana L.), hickory, fruit trees, and some maples are preferred hosts; in some areas persimmon and sweetgum are also readily eaten. In the west, alder, willow (Salix spp.), cottonwood and fruit trees are commonly used. Additional host plant examples include madrone (Arbutus menziesii Pursh), mulberry, ailanthus, American sycamore (Platanus occidentalis L.), and Asian white birch (Betula platyphylla).

Host plant selection is dependent on factors like the plant's degree of sun exposure, age, environmental stress undergone, toughness, and nutritional quality. For example, for an insect that needs energy for processes like dispersal or diapause, consuming plants that provide a lot of carbohydrates could be beneficial; for a female insect that is producing eggs, consuming plants that provide a lot of protein could be beneficial.

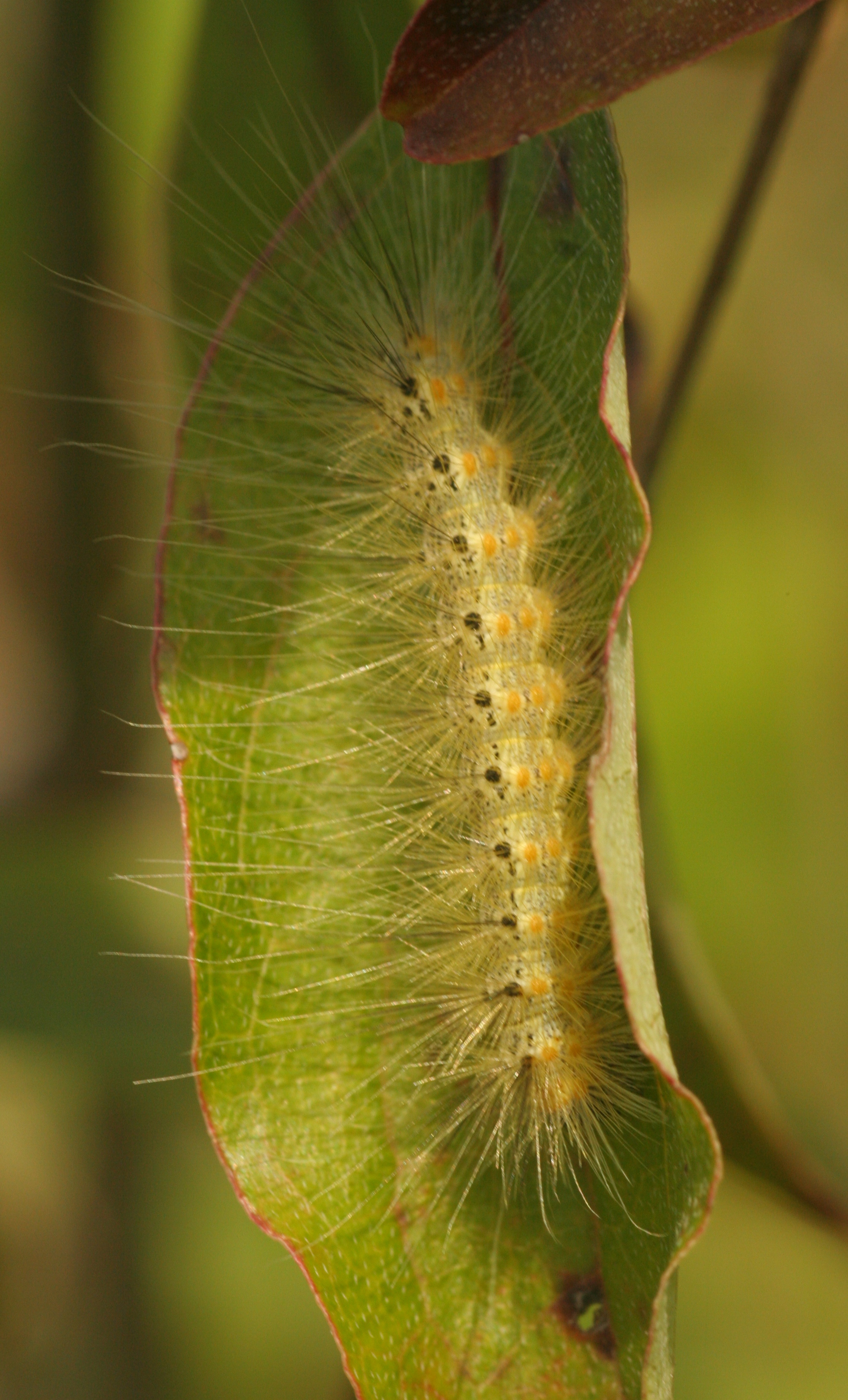
Late instar larva

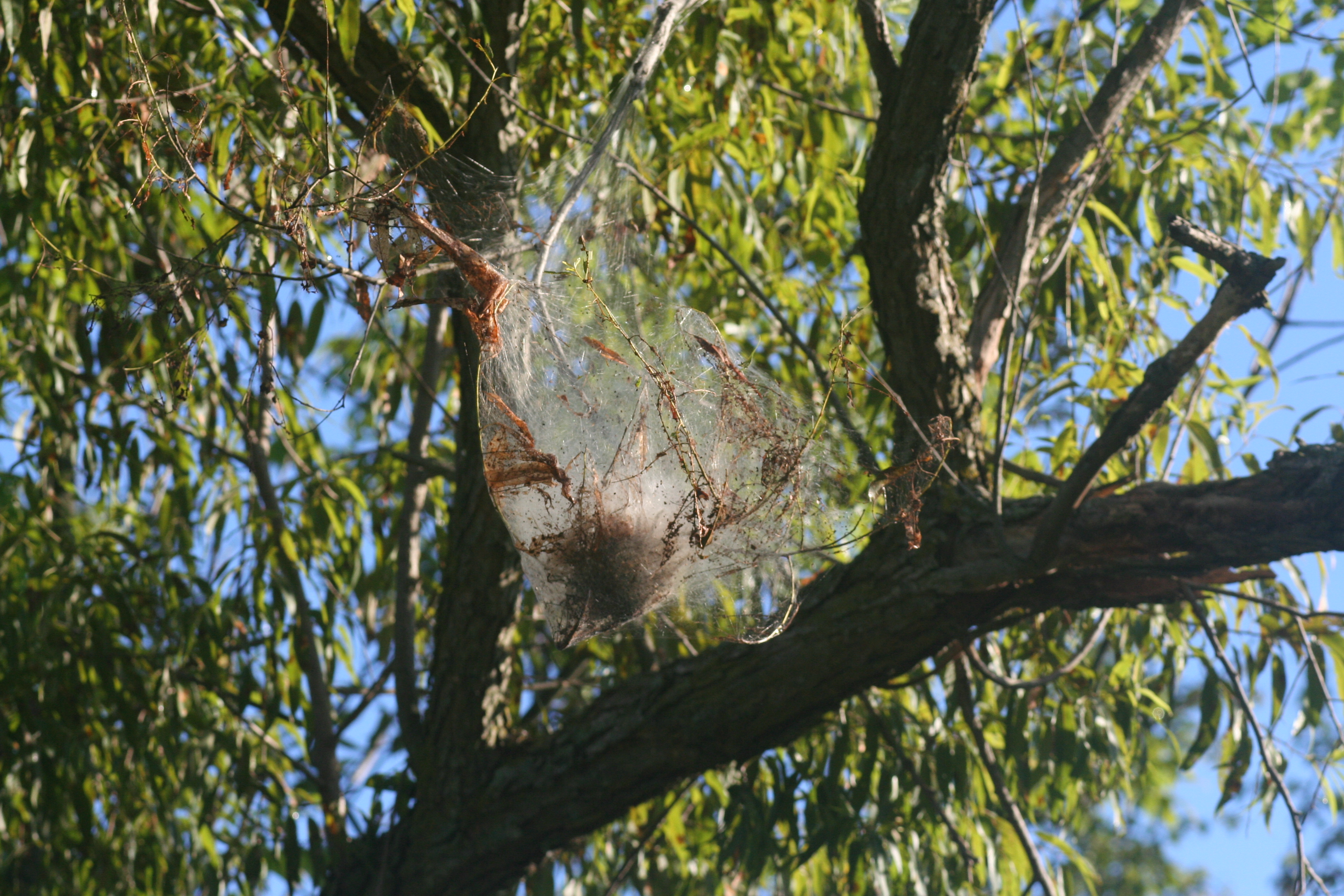
Web on willow

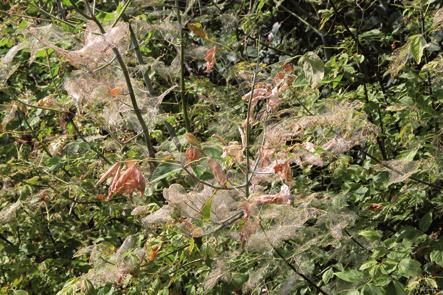
Damage on Acer negundo

== Behavior ==
The fall webworm is a gregarious insect. Groups of larvae live in self-created large webs that are found on tree branches. These webs allow for the finding of mates, temperature regulation, increased growth rate, and protection from predators, but also result in higher rates of infections and predation.

The caterpillars of the fall webworm have several strategies to defend against threats. Some examples of protective behavior or defense are shaking and jerking together, repellant scent, and irritants on hairs or spines.

The fall webworm exhibits a form of parental care, where the female will try to protect the eggs after oviposition by covering her newly laid eggs with her abdomen hairs.

== Reproduction ==
=== Mating limitations ===
Male fall webworms are typically only available for mating for about 30–60 minutes per day.

=== Sex pheromone ===
The sex pheromone consists of the components (9Z,12Z)- 9,12-octadecadienal (I), (9Z,12Z,15Z)-9,12,15-octadecatrienal (II), cis-9,10-epoxy-(3Z,6Z)-3,6-henicosa- diene (III), and cis-9,10-epoxy-(3Z,6Z)-1,3,6-henicosatriene (IV).

== Physiology ==
=== Thermoregulation ===
Fall webworms experience behavioral thermoregulation. The fall webworms' self-created web (which is where the fall webworms live) is able to trap heat. Due to this, the fall webworm (which is an ectotherm) is able to maintain a warm temperature of about 40-50 °C, which allows the larvae to grow and develop faster. Inside the web, there is a temperature difference because the central part tends to have a higher temperature, while the back part tends to have a lower temperature. However, a web's heat trapping process is not always stable; wind can disturb the heat trapping.

=== Intestinal tract ===
There are several components to the fall webworm gut, such as the foregut and the midgut. The foregut and midgut of the fall webworm are alkaline, and Johnson and Felon found that the midgut pH ranged from 8.7 to 11.4.

== Natural enemies ==
=== Predators ===
There are many predators of the fall webworm, such as Monomorium minimum, Vespula spp., Coleomegilla maculata, and Rogas hyphantriae.

=== Parasites ===
The fall webworm is parasitized by around 50 species, such as the flies Musca domestica and Muscina stabulans, and parasitic wasps such as Chouioia cunea, Meteorus hyphantriae, and Therion morio. There are also several species of microsporida that can be harmful, such as Nosema necatrix Kramer (N. necatrix), Pleistophora schubergi hyphantriae Weiser (P.s. hyphantriae), Nosema sp., and Nosema bombycis (N. bombycis ). Nosema bombycis can affect many body tissues, such as the midgut, fat body, gonads, nervous tissue, and Malpighian tubules, and the length of its polar filament is 100 μm. Spores from Nosema of fall webworms are typically egg-shaped and can sometimes be attached to each other, and the length of its polar filament is 57.5 μm ± 8.7 μm.

=== Diseases ===
Several types of pathogens can infect this species, such as granulovirus (which causes granulosis disease) and nucleopolyhedrosis virus. Granulovirus has a rod-like shape. Also, an individual will be more likely to be infected at a younger age.

== Interaction with humans ==
The fall webworm's interaction with humans is important because of how adaptable this species is, which is one of the main reasons that it spread so widely across the world. Fall webworms are able to forage on large amounts of leaves inside their web, they are able to create webs on many different types of host plants, they are able to create webs at many different elevations and of many different shapes, and they spread very quickly. In addition, the fall webworm tends to create many webs or defoliate plants in places that humans spend time, such as recreational areas and parks; fall webworms tend to create their webs on branches and therefore defoliate parts of the tree that are very visible and draw attention. There have been methods with trying to control this organism, such as physical removal or chemical methods; however, there are some issues with these options because physical removal can be challenging with certain types of trees (based on factors like how tall the tree is, what its function is, where it is located), and the side effects of chemicals (such as important pollinators dying and therefore not being able to perform their functions). New, effective methods are needed to control this organism; Wang et al. (2016) showed the effectiveness of a community-based system to monitor webworms, which involved using mobile devices.

A tree, when covered by the web of the fall webworm is, in the Southern States, sometimes called a "fuzzy tree" because of its fuzzy appearance.
