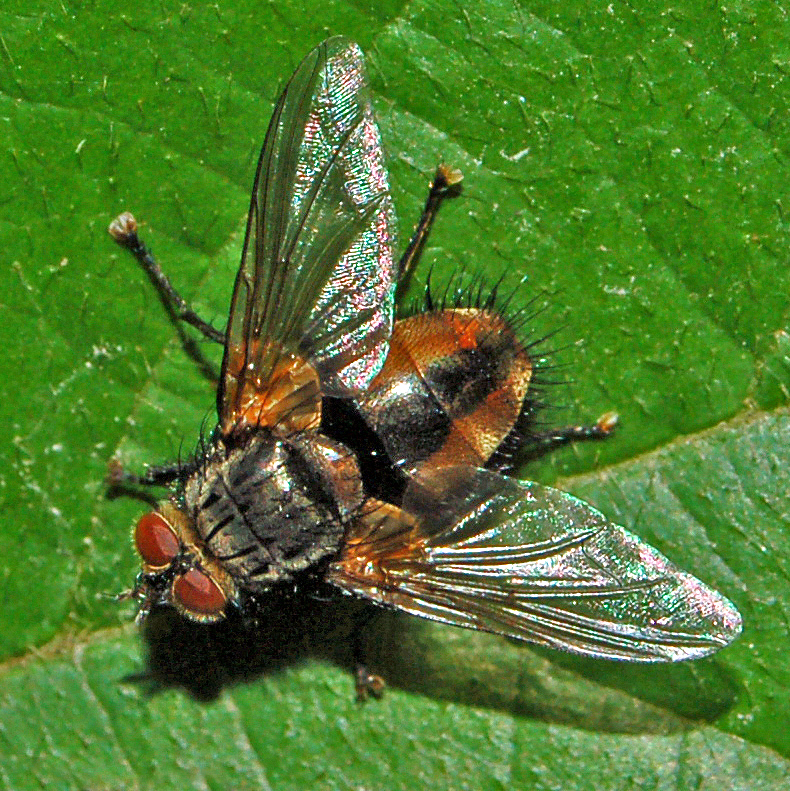
- Nemoraea pellucida

Scientific classification
- Kingdom: Animalia
- Phylum: Arthropoda
- Clade: Pancrustacea
- Class: Insecta
- Order: Diptera
- Family: Tachinidae
- Subfamily: Tachininae
- Tribe: Nemoraeini

= Nemoraeini =

Tribe of flies

Nemoraeini is a tribe of flies in the family Tachinidae.

== Genera ==
- Calohystricia Townsend, 1931
- Ceromasiopsis Townsend, 1927
- Hypotachina Brauer & von Bergenstamm, 1891
- Hystriomyia Portschinsky, 1881
- Lasiona Wulp, 1890
- Lasiopalpus Macquart, 1847
- Macromya Robineau-Desvoidy, 1830
- Nemoraea Robineau-Desvoidy, 1830
- Xanthophyto Townsend, 1916
- Xylocamptomima Townsend, 1927
