= Thrush-like schiffornis =

Thrush-like schiffornis is a species complex that has been split into five species:

- Brown-winged schiffornis, Schiffornis turdina
- Russet-winged schiffornis, Schiffornis stenorhyncha
- Foothill schiffornis, Schiffornis aenea
- Northern schiffornis, Schiffornis veraepacis
- Guianan schiffornis, Schiffornis olivacea

Each of these species was split from the species complex by the American Ornithologists' Union in 2013.
