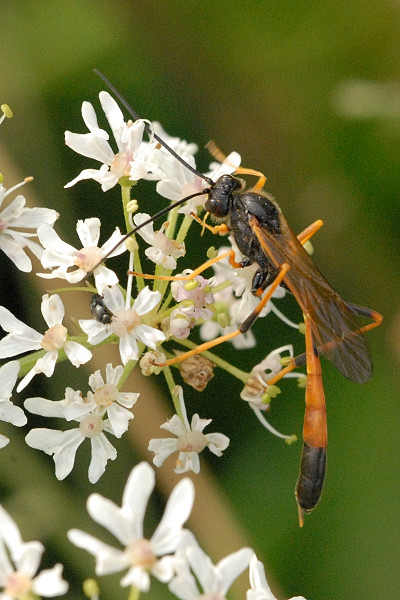
- Erigorgus melanobatus

Scientific classification
- Kingdom: Animalia
- Phylum: Arthropoda
- Clade: Pancrustacea
- Class: Insecta
- Order: Hymenoptera
- Family: Ichneumonidae
- Subfamily: Anomaloninae; Viereck, 1918

Tribes
- Anomalonini; Gravenhorstiini

Synonyms
- Anomalinae

= Anomaloninae =

Subfamily of wasps

Anomaloninae is a subfamily of parasitoid wasps in the family Ichneumonidae. Several species provide beneficial services to humans by attacking forest or orchard pests.

== Description and distribution ==
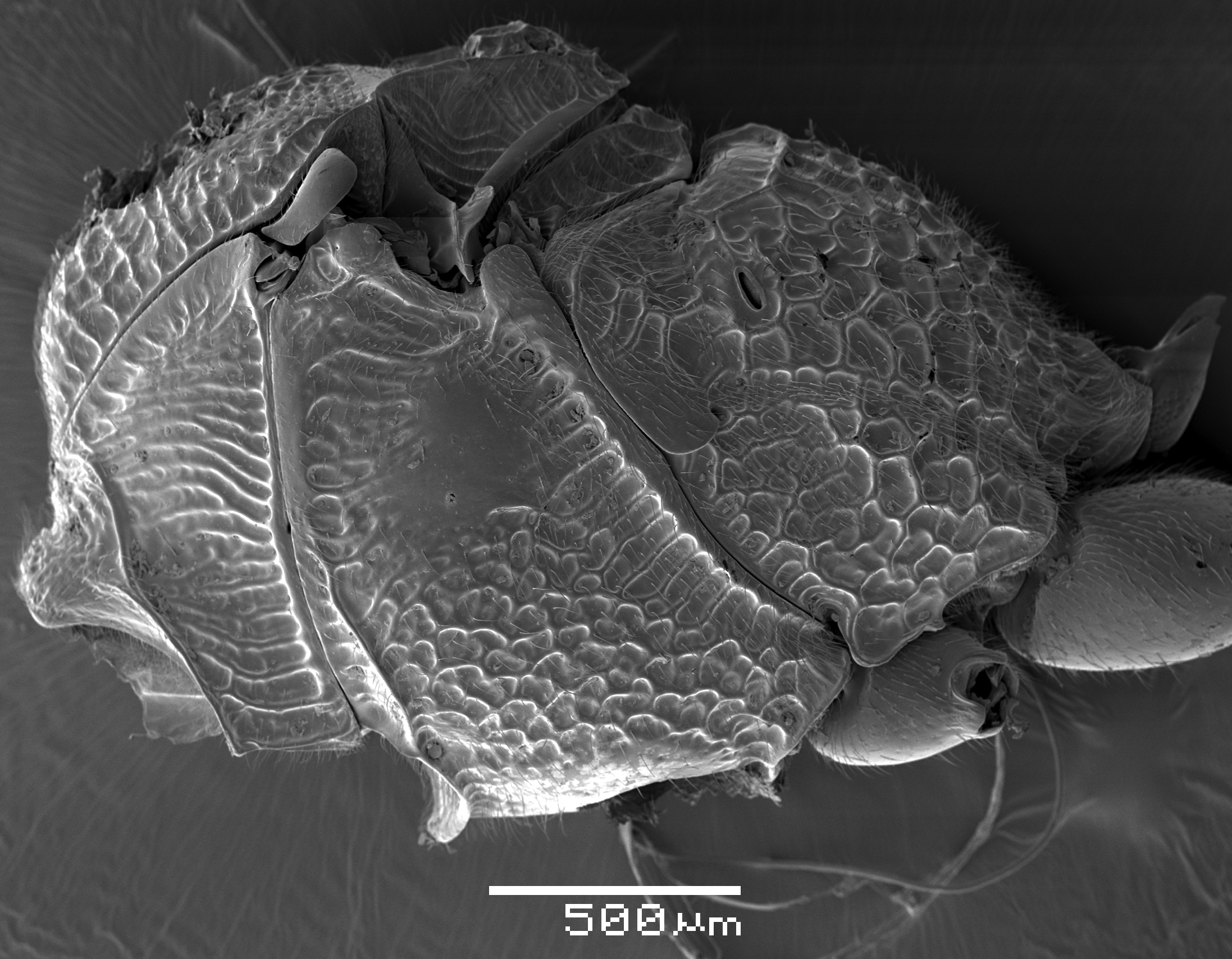
Mesosoma of Anomalon cruentatum showing reticulated pattern of propodeum (right-most body segment)

Species of Anomaloninae are slender, range in size from small to large, and are usually black or brownish in color. Yellow markings on the face and legs are common. One of the most distinguishing characteristics of this subfamily is the highly reticulated propodeum.

Species are found worldwide.

== Biology and behavior ==
Anomalonines are koinobiont endoparasitoids of Lepidoptera or Coleoptera. Eggs are laid by females into the larval host, but the host is allowed to continue development to the pupal stage. Adult wasps emerge from the host pupa.

They are found in nearly all forested habitats, and unlike most other groups of ichneumonids, are also fairly common in dry habitats.

Anomalonines fly slowly in a characteristic pose, with the metasoma elevated, antennae outstretched, and legs held out behind them.

== Genera ==
Sources:

- Agrypon Forster, 1860^{c g b}
- Anomalon Panzer, 1803^{c g b}
- Aphanistes Forster, 1869^{c g b}
- Atrometoides Fahringer, 1922^{c g}
- Atrometus Förster, 1869^{c g}
- Aubertiana Viktorov, 1970^{c g}
- Barylypa Forster, 1869^{c g b}
- Bimentum Townes, 1971^{c g}
- Brachynervus Uchida, 1955^{c g}
- Calcaneum Townes, 1971^{c g}
- Castrosion Gauld & Bradshaw, 1997^{c g}
- Cechenodes Townes, 1971^{c g}
- ClathaCameron, 1905^{c}
- Clypeocampulum Gauld, 1976^{c g}
- Corsoncus Townes, 1971^{c g}
- Elaticarina Sheng, 2012
- Encardia Tosquinet, 1896^{c g}
- Erigorgus Förster, 1869^{c g b}
- Gravenhorstia Boie, 1836^{c g}
- Habrocampulum Gauld, 1976^{c g}
- Habronyx Foerster, 1868^{c g}
- Helenanomalon Broad, 2014
- Heteropelma Wesmael, 1849^{c g}
- Indagrypon Nikam, 1982^{c g}
- Kokujewiella Shestakov, 1926^{c g}
- Liopterna Townes, 1971^{c g}
- Metoa Townes, 1971^{c g}
- Neohabronyx Dasch, 1984^{c g}
- Ophionellus Westwood, 1874^{c g b}
- Ophiopterus Brulle, 1846^{c g b}
- Parania Morley, 1913^{c g}
- Perisphincter Townes, 1961^{c g}
- Phaenolabrorychus Viereck, 1913^{c g}
- Podogaster Brullé, 1846^{c g}
- Porizonopteron Meier, 1931^{c g}
- Pseudagrypon Lee & Kim, 1984^{c g}
- Pseudanomalon Szépligeti, 1905^{c g}
- Ribasia Ceballos, 1920^{c g}
- Sphaeromanus Aubert, 1979^{c g}
- Spolas Townes, 1961^{c g}
- Stangepelma Porter, 1977^{c g}
- Therion Curtis, 1829^{c g b}
- Trichomma Wesmael, 1849^{c g b}
- Vernamalon Gauld, 1976^{c g}

Data sources: i = ITIS, c = Catalogue of Life, g = GBIF, b = Bugguide.net

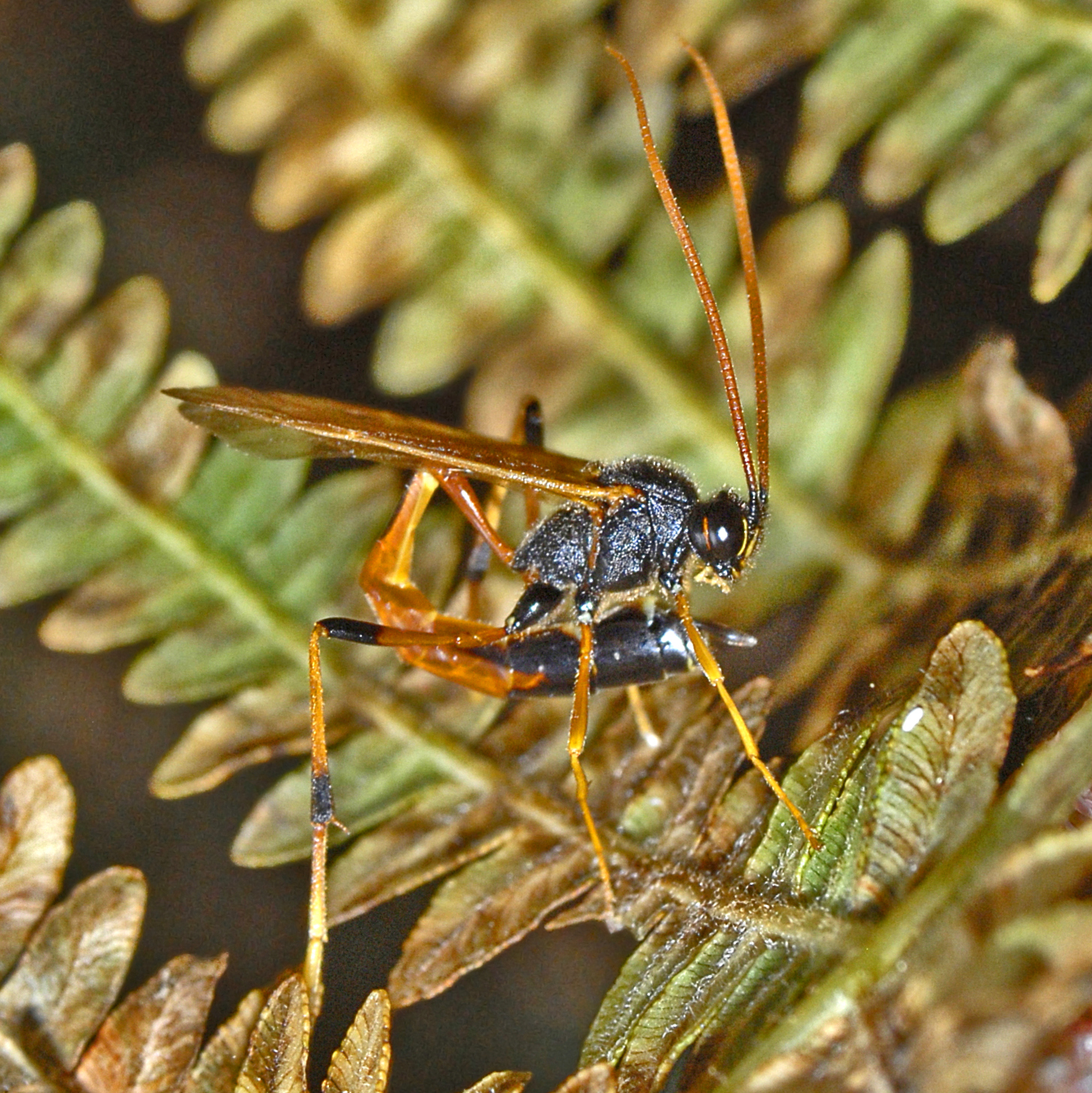
Therion circumflexum

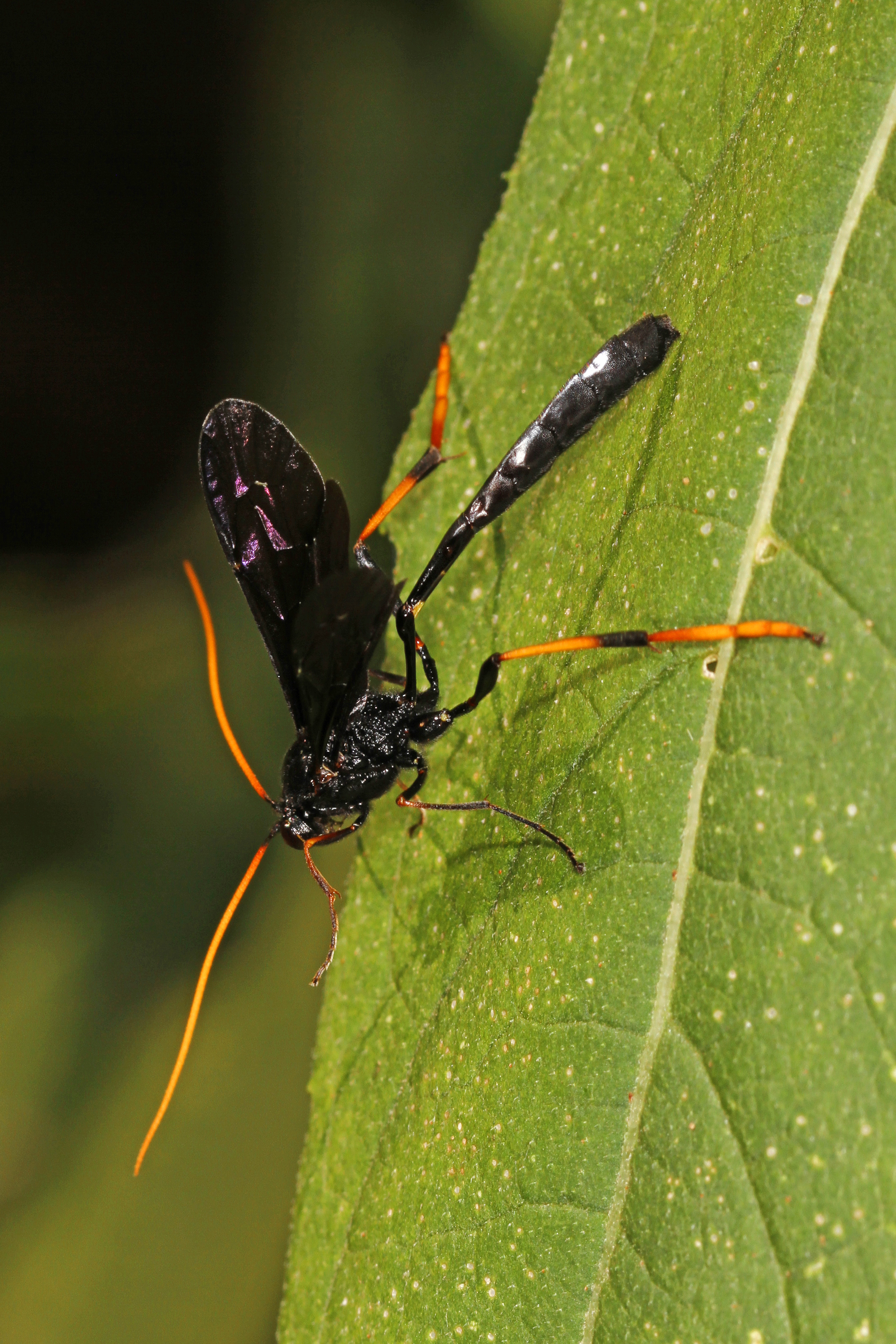
Therion morio, Maryland
