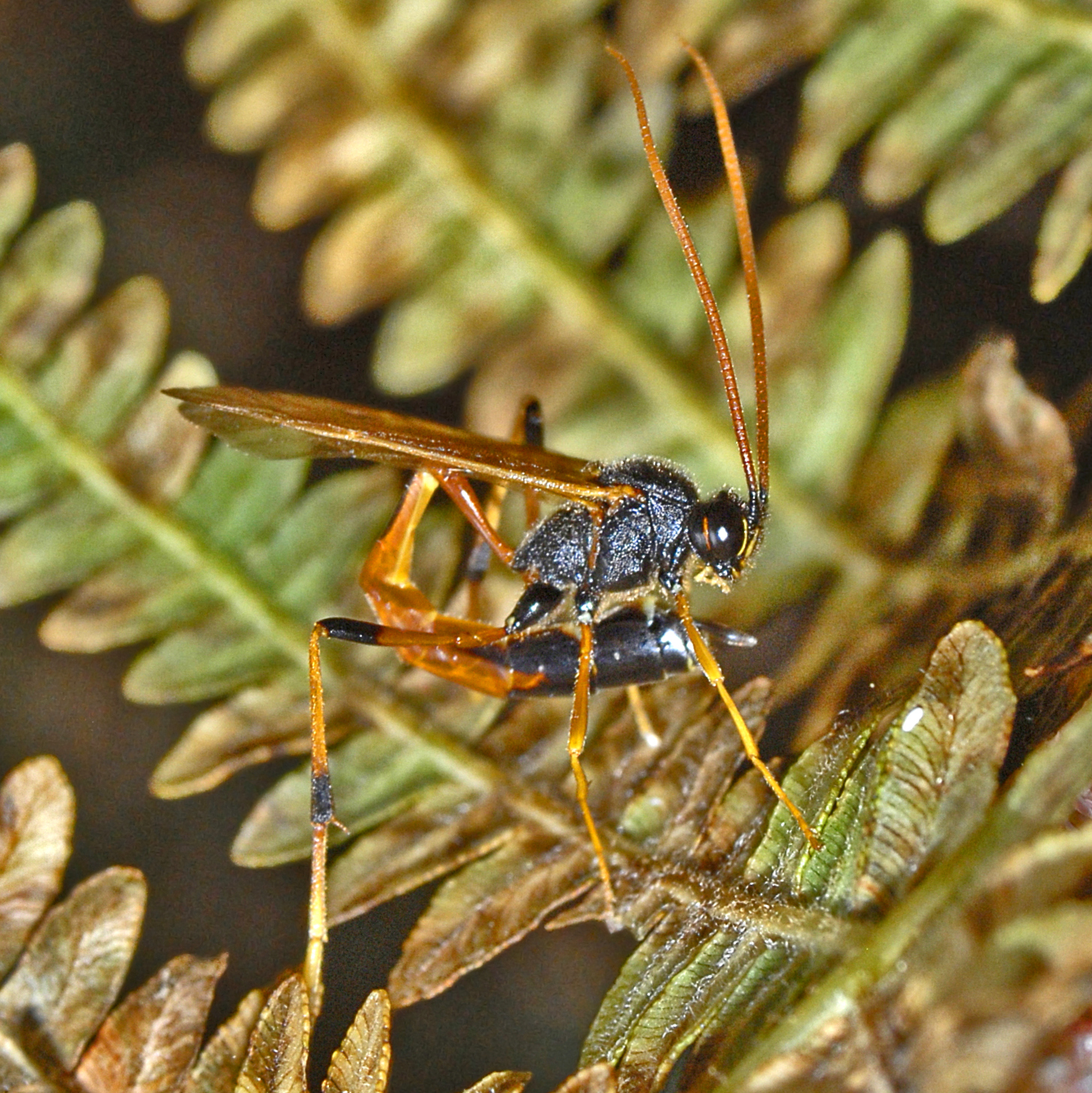
- Therion circumflexum

Scientific classification
- Domain: Eukaryota
- Kingdom: Animalia
- Phylum: Arthropoda
- Class: Insecta
- Order: Hymenoptera
- Family: Ichneumonidae
- Subfamily: Anomaloninae
- Tribe: Gravenhorstiini; Enderlein, 1912

= Gravenhorstiini =

Tribe of wasps

Gravenhorstiini is a large tribe of parasitoid wasps belonging to the family Ichneumonidae It contains all the genera of the subfamily Anomaloninae, excepting Anomalon.

== Genera ==
- Agrypon Forster, 1860
- Aphanistes Forster, 1869
- Atrometoides Fahringer, 1922
- Atrometus Förster, 1869
- Aubertiana Viktorov, 1970
- Barylypa Forster, 1869
- Bimentum Townes, 1971
- Brachynervus Uchida, 1955
- Calcaneum Townes, 1971
- Castrosion Gauld & Bradshaw, 1997
- Cechenodes Townes, 1971
- Clatha Cameron, 1905
- Clypeocampulum Gauld, 1976
- Corsoncus Townes, 1971
- Elaticarina Sheng, 2012
- Encardia Tosquinet, 1896
- Erigorgus Förster, 1869
- Gravenhorstia Boie, 1836
- Habrocampulum Gauld, 1976
- Habronyx Foerster, 1868
- Helenanomalon Broad, 2014
- Heteropelma Wesmael, 1849
- Indagrypon Nikam, 1982
- Kokujewiella Shestakov, 1926
- Liopterna Townes, 1971
- Metoa Townes, 1971
- Neohabronyx Dasch, 1984
- Ophionellus Westwood, 1874
- Ophiopterus Brulle, 1846
- Parania Morley, 1913
- Perisphincter Townes, 1961
- Phaenolabrorychus Viereck, 1913
- Podogaster Brullé, 1846
- Porizonopteron Meier, 1931
- Pseudagrypon Lee & Kim, 1984
- Pseudanomalon Szépligeti, 1905
- Ribasia Ceballos, 1920
- Sphaeromanus Aubert, 1979
- Spolas Townes, 1961
- Stangepelma Porter, 1977
- Therion Curtis, 1829
- Trichomma Wesmael, 1849
- Vernamalon Gauld, 1976
