= Habronyx minutus =

Scientific classification
- Domain: Eukaryota
- Kingdom: Animalia
- Phylum: Arthropoda
- Class: Insecta
- Order: Hymenoptera
- Family: Ichneumonidae
- Genus: Habronyx
- Species: H. minutus

Binomial name
- Habronyx minutus D. F. Ward, 2015

Species of wasp

Habronyx minutus is a species of small parasitic wasp in the subfamily Anomaloninae of family Ichneumonidae. It has a length of 5.5 to 8 millimetres (0.22 to 0.31 in). The species was described by D. F. Ward in 2015, and the holotype was collected in December 1980 at Pelorus Bridge.

== Description ==
Habronyx minutus has a total length of 5.5 to 8 millimetres (0.22 to 0.31 in) with a 3.8 to 5.8 millimetres (0.15 to 0.23 in)–long fore wing. Male antennae contain 30 to 31 flagellomeres; female antennae have between 26 and 30 flagellomeres. The flagellomeres and scape are brown. A tooth is positioned at the apex of the clypeus, and the species has tooth–like mandibles. Its epomiae are long and the species lacks a sternaulus. The fore legs are yellow and the hind legs are red–brown in colour. The mesoscuta and scutella are red–brown. The species' body and head contain short setae, and it has short claws at the tarsus. Colouration varies within specimens; more red–brown examples contain more black markings than yellow specimens. The face of Habronyx minutus is between red–brown and light yellow.

== Taxonomy ==
Habronyx is the most populated Anomaloninae genus, containing 44 identified species. The holotype specimen, an adult female, was collected on 13 December 1980 at Pelorus Bridge, Marlborough Region, New Zealand, which crosses the Pelorus River. Ten paratypes were used in the description of Habronyx minutus (six male, three female, one unrecorded), and the species was described by D. F. Ward on 8 January 2015. It only occurs in the North Island and South Island of New Zealand. The species name minutus is Latin for "small", referring to the body size of the wasp.
