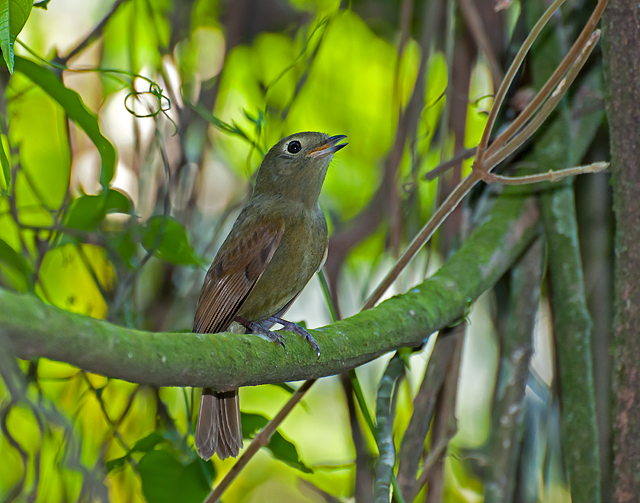
- At Serra da Cantareira State Park, São Paulo State, Brazil

Conservation status
- Least Concern (IUCN 3.1)

Scientific classification
- Kingdom: Animalia
- Phylum: Chordata
- Class: Aves
- Order: Passeriformes
- Family: Tityridae
- Genus: Schiffornis
- Species: S. virescens

Binomial name
- Schiffornis virescens (Lafresnaye, 1838)

Synonyms
- See text

= Greenish schiffornis =

Species of bird

The greenish schiffornis (Schiffornis virescens) is a species of bird in the family Tityridae, the tityras, becards, and allies. It is found in Argentina, Brazil, and Paraguay.

== Taxonomy and systematics ==
The greenish schiffornis was originally described as Ptilochloris virescens. It was later reassigned to genus Schiffornis when it was realized that it was the same species as Schiffornis unicolor that Bonaparte described when he erected the genus in 1854. It retained the specific epithet unicolor into the early twentieth century. For much of the twentieth century Schiffornis was placed in the manakin family Pipridae and its species were called manakins. Several early twenty-first century studies confirmed the placement of Schiffornis in Tityridae and taxonomic systems made the reassignment.

The greenish schiffornis is monotypic.

== Description ==
The greenish schiffornis is about 15.5 cm (6.1 in) long and weighs 21.5 to 28.5 g (0.76 to 1.0 oz). The sexes have the same plumage. Adults have an indistinct pale ring around the eye on an otherwise greenish brown face. Their upperparts are greenish brown and their wings and tail are rufescent. Their underparts are a lighter greenish brown than their upperparts. They have a dark brown iris, an olive-grayish bill, and olive-grayish legs.

== Distribution and habitat ==
The greenish schiffornis is found in southeastern Brazil south of a line roughly from southeastern Bahia southwest to northern Rio Grande do Sul. Its range continues south through eastern Paraguay into northeastern Argentina's Misiones and Corrientes provinces. The species inhabits humid primary forest, mature secondary forest, and gallery forest, where it favors the understory to mid-story. In elevation it ranges from sea level to about 1,200 m (3,900 ft).

== Behavior ==
=== Movement ===
The greenish schiffornis is believed to be a year-round resident.

=== Feeding ===
The greenish schiffornis is known to feed on adult insects and caterpillars. Its diet and foraging behavior are believed to be similar to that of the brown-winged schiffornis (S. turdina), which see here.

=== Breeding ===
One greenish schiffornis nest has been described. It was a cup made from leaves placed in a branch fork about 3 m (10 ft) above the ground and contained two eggs. Based on museum specimens of eggs and birds, the species' breeding season spans at least October to February. Clutches of three eggs have been photographed at least twice. The species' eggs are oval to elliptical and are white without markings.

=== Vocalization ===
The greenish schiffornis' song is "variations of very high, thin tjuuh-witwée (1st part low and drawn out; 2nd part with 2 decisive, short notes; last one highest".

== Status ==
The IUCN has assessed the greenish schiffornis as being of Least Concern. It has a large range; its population size is not known and is believed to be decreasing. No immediate threats have been identified. It is considered "frequent to uncommon" in Brazil.
