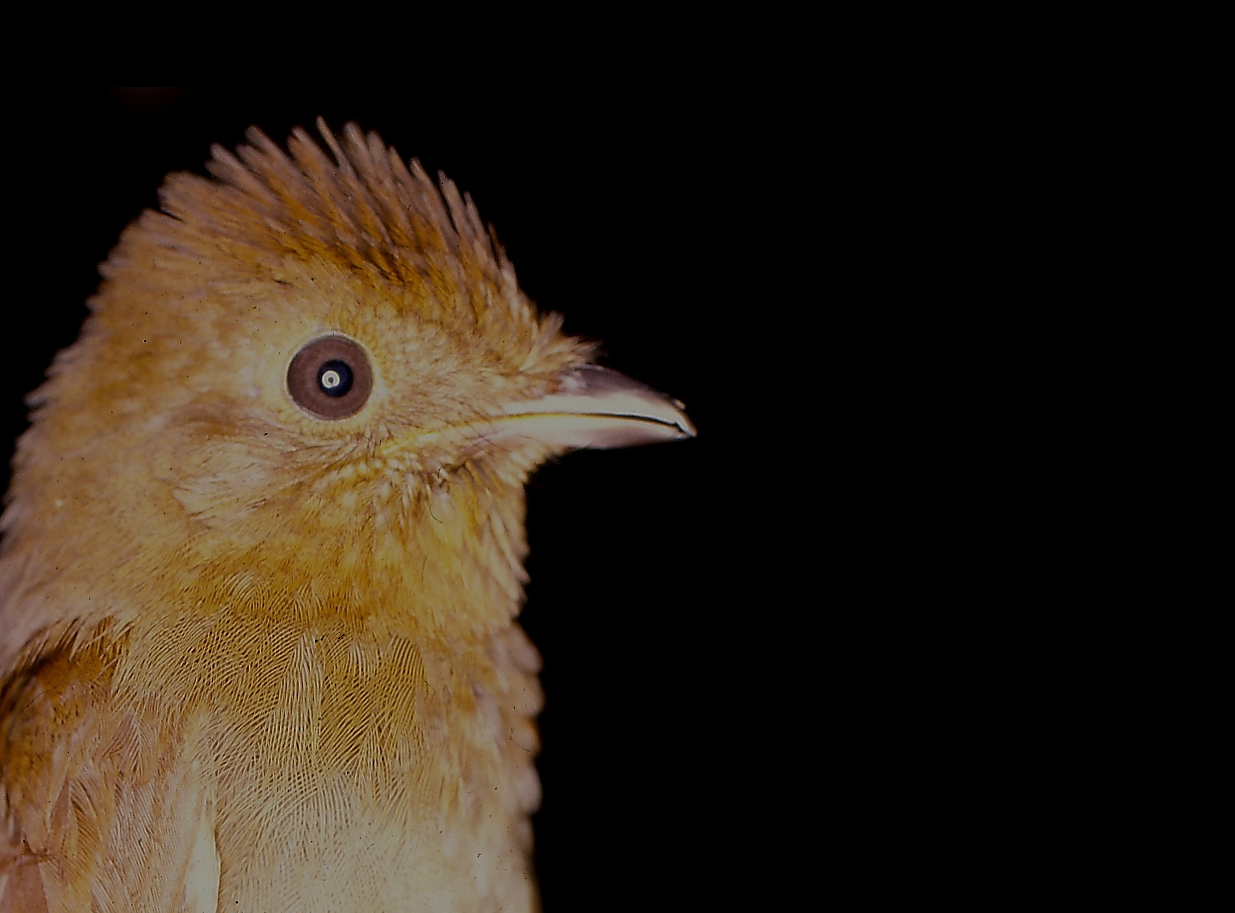

Conservation status
- Least Concern (IUCN 3.1)

Scientific classification
- Kingdom: Animalia
- Phylum: Chordata
- Class: Aves
- Order: Passeriformes
- Family: Tityridae
- Genus: Schiffornis
- Species: S. stenorhyncha

Binomial name
- Schiffornis stenorhyncha (Sclater, PL & Salvin, 1869)

= Russet-winged schiffornis =

Species of bird

The russet-winged schiffornis, or russet-winged mourner, (Schiffornis stenorhyncha) is a species of Neotropical bird in the family Tityridae, the tityras, becards, and allies. It is found in Colombia, Panama, and Venezuela.

== Taxonomy and systematics ==
The russet-winged schiffornis was originally described as Heteropelma stenorhynchum. However, genus Heteropelma had earlier been established for a wasp and so by the principle of priority the species had to be reassigned. For much of the twentieth century Schiffornis was placed in the manakin family Pipridae and its species were called manakins. Several early twenty-first century studies confirmed the placement of Schiffornis in Tityridae and taxonomic systems made the reassignment. In 1998 the American Ornithological Society was unsure where to place the genus and listed its members as incertae sedis but in 2011 moved them to Tityridae.

The russet-winged schiffornis was long treated as a subspecies of Schiffornis turdina, which at the time was called the thrush-like manakin and later called the thrush-like schiffornis. Since at least the late twentieth century taxonomists had suspected that several species were embedded within Schiffornis turdina. Studies published in 2007 and 2011 confirmed that S. turdina was polyphyletic. Following these studies taxonomists separated the russet-winged schiffornis and three other species from S. turdina, and gave the reduced species its current English name of brown-winged schiffornis. The process began in 2012 and took at least until 2016 for the major taxonomic systems to implement. (BirdLife International's Handbook of the Birds of the World calls all of the five species "mourner" rather than "schiffornis".)

The russet-winged schiffornis has two subspecies, the nominate S. s. stenorhyncha (Sclater, PL & Salvin, 1869) and S. s. panamensis (Hellmayr, 1929).

== Description ==
The russet-winged schiffornis is 15.5 to 16.5 cm (6.1 to 6.5 in) long and weighs about 30 to 34 g (1.1 to 1.2 oz). The sexes have the same plumage. Adults of the nominate subspecies S. t. turdina have an indistinct pale ring around the eye on an otherwise rufous-brown face. Their upperparts and tail are rufous-brown. Their wings are rufous-brown with more rufous feather edges. Their throat and breast are brown with a yellowish tinge and their belly and vent grayish olive. Subspecies S. s. panamensis is paler overall than the nominate, with a brighter brown crown, wings, and tail and a cinnamon-rufous throat. Both subspecies have a brown to dark brown iris.

== Distribution and habitat ==
Subspecies S. s. panamensis of the russet-winged schiffornis is the more northerly of the two. It is found from central Panama south into northwestern Colombia, where it occurs in northern Chocó Department to western Córdoba Department. The nominate subspecies is found across northern and northeastern Colombia into northern Venezuela intermittently from Zulia and Táchira east to Aragua. The species primarily inhabits the interior of humid forest; it also is found, though rarely, at the forest edge. In elevation it is found up to about 1,500 m (4,900 ft) in Colombia and to 1,800 m (5,900 ft) in Venezuela.

== Behavior ==
=== Movement ===
The russet-winged schiffornis is believed to be a year-round resident.

=== Feeding ===
The russet-winged schiffornis feeds on fruits and insects, though details are lacking. It usually forages singly and only rarely joins mixed-species feeding flocks. It forages mostly in the forests's understory, often clinging to a low-level vertical stem, and takes food from vegetation with short sallies from a perch.

=== Breeding ===
The russet-winged schiffornis' breeding season spans at least January to June in Colombia; its season elsewhere is not known. Its one known nest, found in Colombia in February, was a cup made from dry leaves placed in a palm between a leaf stem and the trunk about 0.4 m (1 ft) above the ground. It contained two eggs that were light cream with very dark purple spots. The clutch was incubated for 21 days and the nestlings fledged 20 days later. Both parents provisioned the nestlings.

=== Vocalization ===
The russet-winged schiffornis' song is a "sequence of normally 2–4 clear, rich musical whistles, the second and third ones being sharply upslurred". For subspecies S. s. panamensis it is written as "teeuu, wheet-wheet, wheet".

== Status ==
The IUCN has assessed the russet-winged schiffornis as being of Least Concern. It has a large range; its estimated population of 20,000 to 50,000 mature individuals is believed to be decreasing. No immediate threats have been identified. It is considered "locally fairly common" in Colombia and local in Venezuela. It occurs in a few protected areas.
