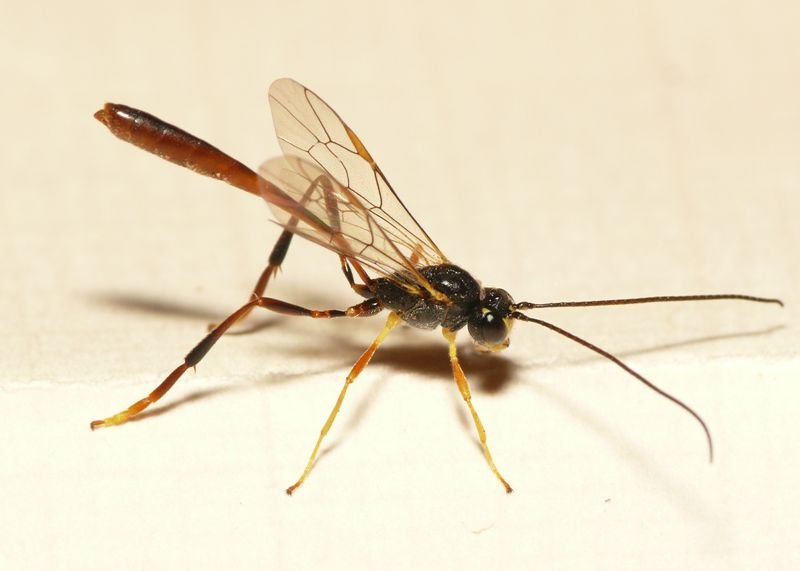

Scientific classification
- Kingdom: Animalia
- Phylum: Arthropoda
- Class: Insecta
- Order: Hymenoptera
- Family: Ichneumonidae
- Subfamily: Anomaloninae
- Tribe: Gravenhorstiini
- Genus: Agrypon; Förster, 1860

Extant species
- See text

= Agrypon =

Genus of wasps

Agrypon is a genus of parasitoid wasps belonging to the family Ichneumonidae.

The genus was described in 1860 by Arnold Förster.

The genus has cosmopolitan distribution.

Species:

- Agrypon anxium (Wesmael, 1849)
- Agrypon batis (Ratzeburg, 1855)
- Agrypon clandestinum (Gravenhorst, 1829)
- Agrypon flaveolatum (Gravenhorst, 1807)
- Agrypon flexorium (Thunberg, 1822)
- Agrypon gracilipes (Curtis, 1839)
- Agrypon interstitiale Schnee, 1989
- Agrypon scutellatum (Hellén, 1926)
- Agrypon varitarsum
