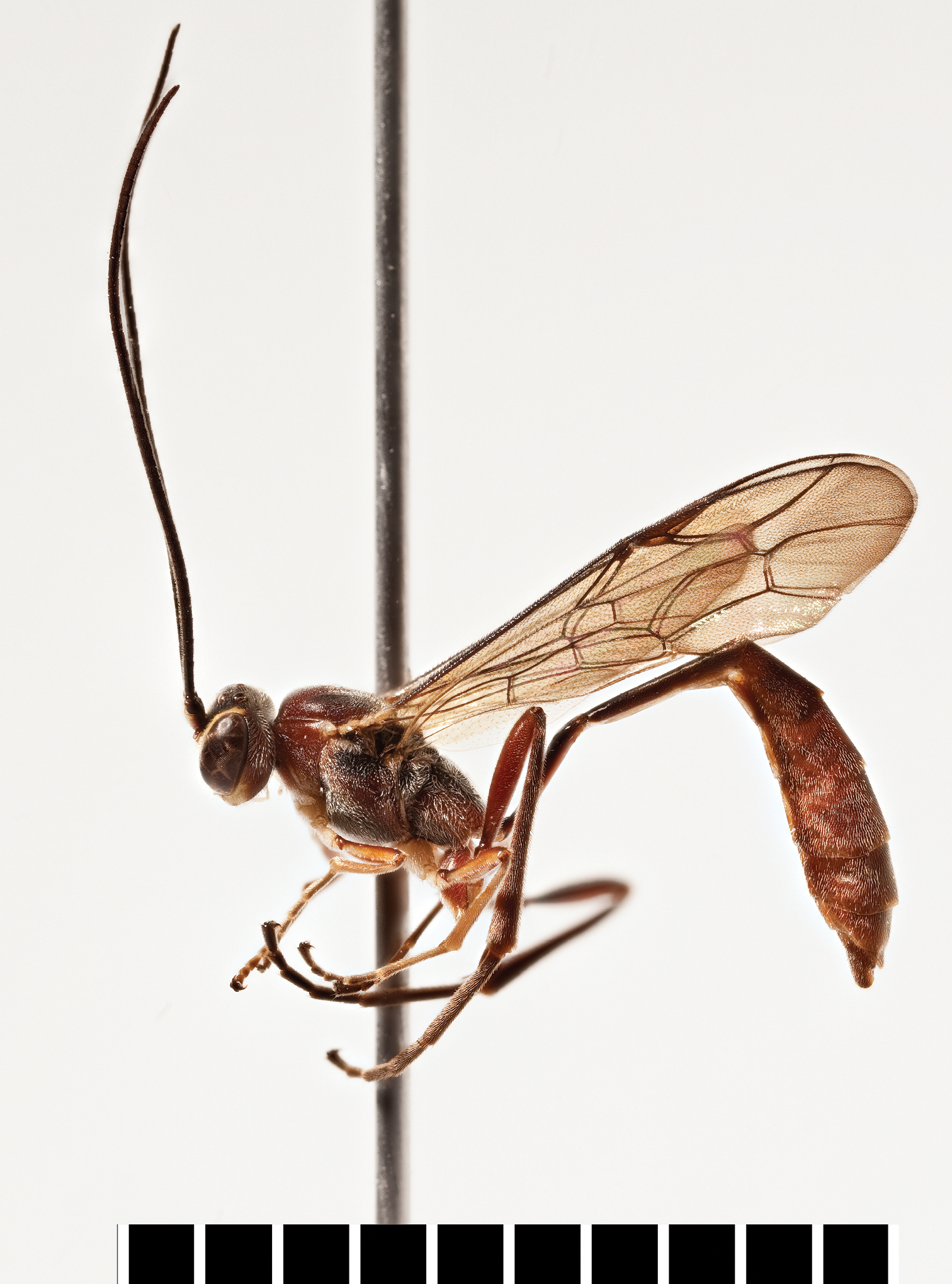
- Holotype ♂ of Helenanomalon bonapartei; scale bar = 10 mm

Scientific classification
- Domain: Eukaryota
- Kingdom: Animalia
- Phylum: Arthropoda
- Class: Insecta
- Order: Hymenoptera
- Family: Ichneumonidae
- Tribe: Gravenhorstiini
- Genus: Helenanomalon; Broad, 2014

Species
- Helenanomalon ashmolei Broad, 2014; Helenanomalon bonapartei Broad, 2014

= Helenanomalon =

Genus of wasps

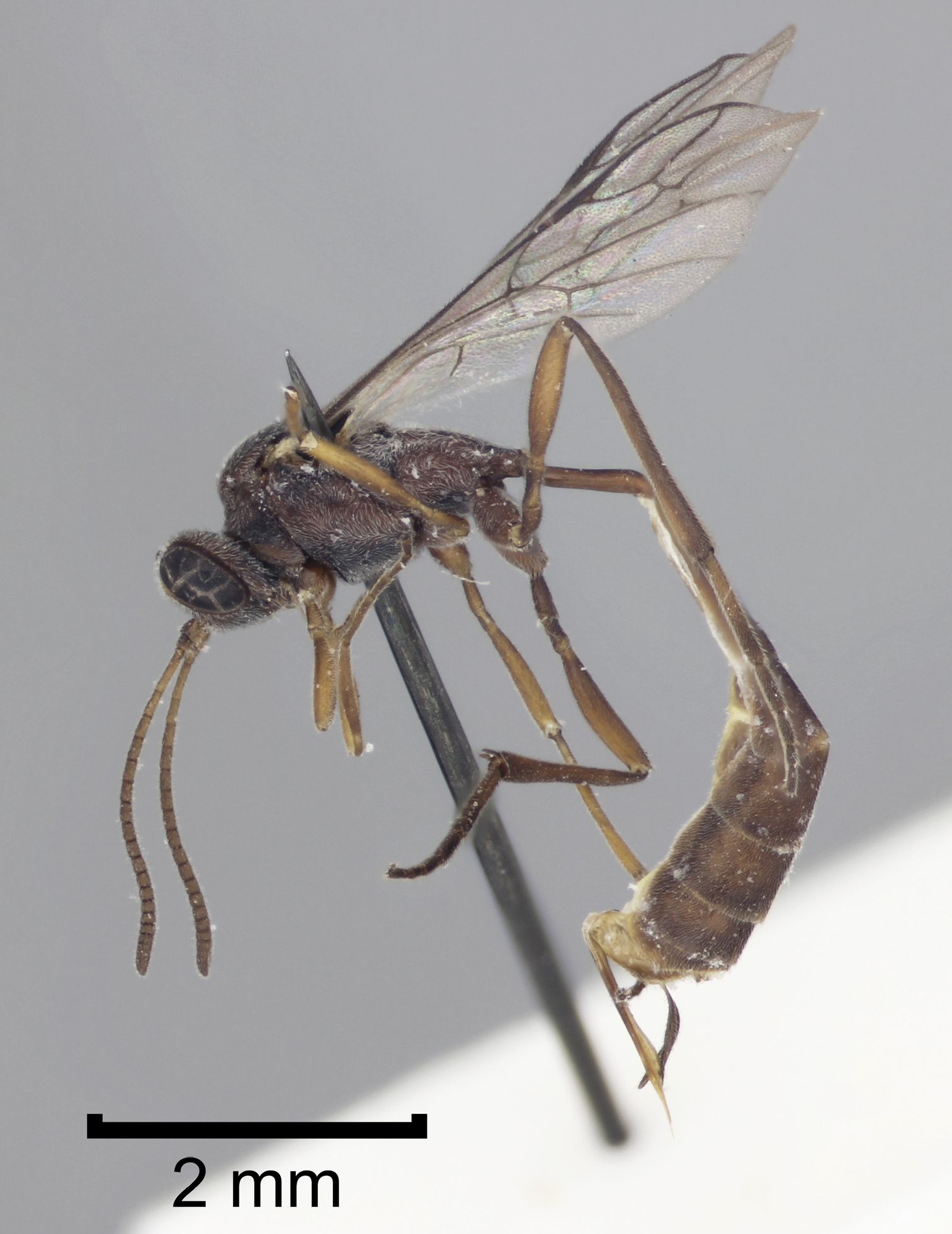
Holotype ♀ of Helenanomalon ashmolei

Helenanomalon is a genus of ichneumon wasp that belongs to the subfamily Anomaloninae. It contains two species that are endemic to the island of Saint Helena in the South Atlantic Ocean.
