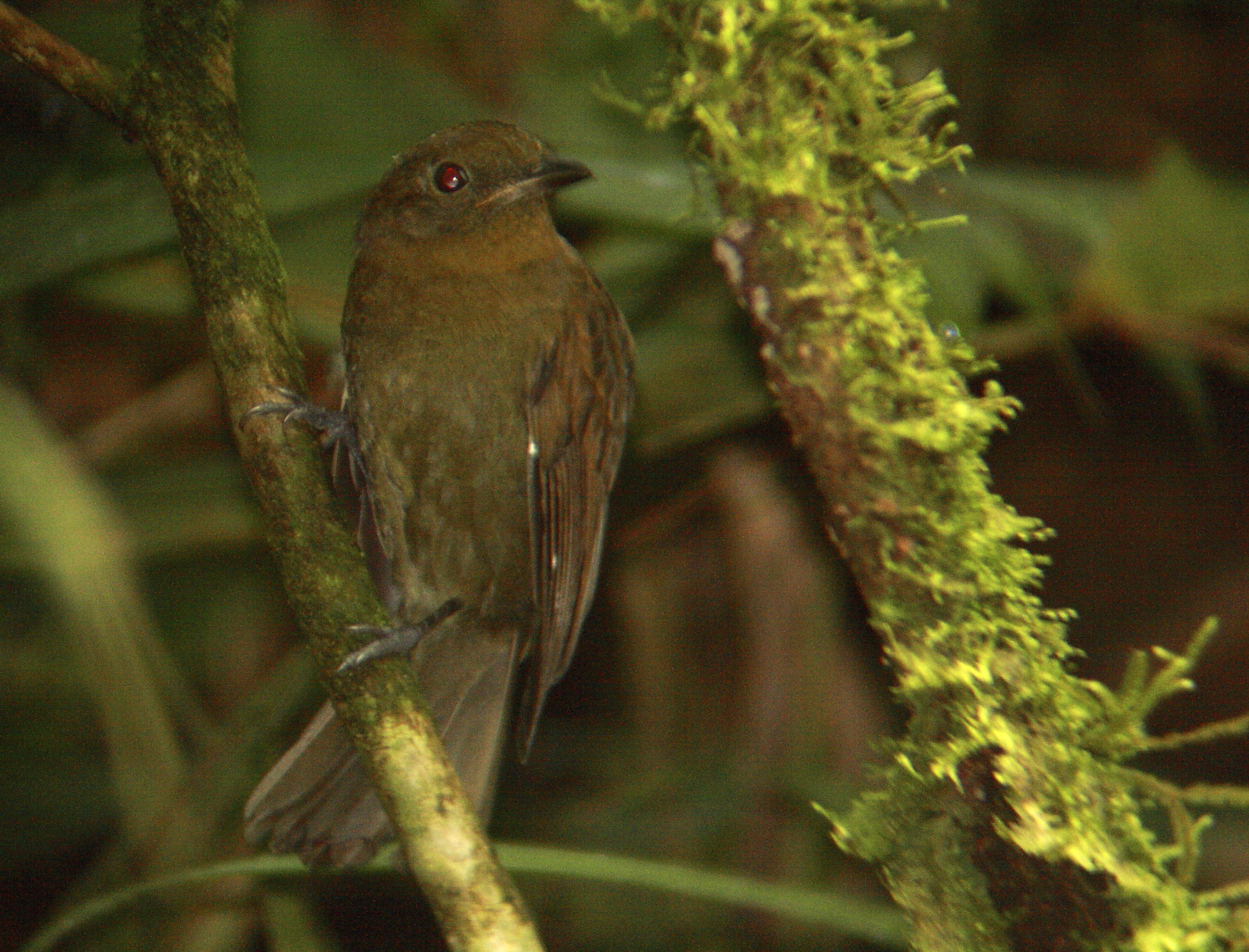

Conservation status
- Least Concern (IUCN 3.1)

Scientific classification
- Kingdom: Animalia
- Phylum: Chordata
- Class: Aves
- Order: Passeriformes
- Family: Tityridae
- Genus: Schiffornis
- Species: S. veraepacis

Binomial name
- Schiffornis veraepacis (Sclater, PL & Salvin, 1860)

= Northern schiffornis =

Species of bird

The northern schiffornis, or northern mourner, (Schiffornis veraepacis), is a species of Neotropical bird in the family Tityridae, the tityras, becards, and allies. It is found in Mexico, every Central American country except El Salvador, and in Colombia, Ecuador, and Peru.

== Taxonomy and systematics ==
The northern schiffornis was originally described in 1860 as Heteropelma verae-pacis. However, genus Heteropelma had earlier been established for a wasp and so by the principle of priority the species had to be reassigned. For much of the twentieth century Schiffornis was placed in the manakin family Pipridae and its species were called manakins. Several early twenty-first century studies confirmed the placement of Schiffornis in Tityridae and taxonomic systems made the reassignment. In 1998 the American Ornithological Society was unsure where to place the genus and listed its members as incertae sedis but in 2011 moved them to Tityridae.

What is now the northern schiffornis was eventually treated as a subspecies of what was then called the thrush-like manakin and later called the thrush-like schiffornis, Schiffornis turdina. Since at least the late twentieth century taxonomists had suspected that several species were embedded within Schiffornis turdina. Studies published in 2007 and 2011 confirmed that S. turdina was polyphyletic. Following these studies taxonomists separated the northern schiffornis and three other species from S. turdina, and gave the reduced species its current English name of brown-winged schiffornis. The process began in 2012 and took at least until 2016 for the major taxonomic systems to implement. (BirdLife International's Handbook of the Birds of the World calls all of the five species "mourner" rather than "schiffornis".)

The northern schiffornis has these four subspecies:

- S. v. veraepacis (Sclater, PL & Salvin, 1860)
- S. v. dumicola (Bangs, 1903)
- S. v. acrolophites Wetmore, 1972
- S. v. rosenbergi (Hartert, EJO]], 1898)

== Description ==
The northern schiffornis is 15.5 to 16.5 cm (6.1 to 6.5 in) long and weighs about 20 to 40 g (0.71 to 1.4 oz). The sexes have the same plumage. Adults of the nominate subspecies S. v. veraepacis have an indistinct pale ring around the eye on an otherwise dark brownish olive face. Their upperparts and tail are dark brownish olive. Their wings are a warmer brown. Their throat and breast are brownish olive and their belly and vent grayish olive. Subspecies S. v. dumicola is darker and more olive than the nominate, with little difference between their back and breast. S. v. acrolophites is even darker and more olive than dumicola but with a chestnut-brown chin and throat. S. v. rosenbergi has entirely dark brownish olive underparts with no gray. All subspecies have a dark iris.

== Distribution and habitat ==
The subspecies of the northern schiffornis are found thus:

- S. v. veraepacis: from southern Veracruz and northern Oaxaca in southern Mexico south (excluding much of the Yucatán Peninsula) along the Gulf/Caribbean slope through Belize, Guatemala, Nicaragua, and Costa Rica, and also on the Pacific slope of Costa Rica from central Puntarenas Province south
- S. v. dumicola: Panama, in Veraguas and Colón provinces on the Caribbean slope and from Chiriquí Province to western Panamá Province on the Pacific slope
- S. v. acrolophites: from extreme eastern Panama south into northwestern Colombia's Serranía del Baudó
- S. v. rosenbergi: Pacific slope from Chocó Department in northwestern Colombia south through western Ecuador and just barely into extreme northwestern Peru's Tumbes Department

The northern schiffornis primarily inhabits the interior of humid to wet evergreen forest; it only rarely occurs at the forest edge and nearby mature secondary forest. In elevation it ranges from sea level to 1,200 m (3,900 ft) in northern Central America, to 1,000 m (3,300 ft) on the Caribbean slope and to 1,700 m (5,600 ft) on the Pacific slope of Costa Rica, to 1,500 m (4,900 ft) in Colombia, and to 1,300 m (4,300 ft) in Ecuador.

== Behavior ==
=== Movement ===
The northern schiffornis is believed to be a year-round resident.

=== Feeding ===
The northern schiffornis feeds on fruits and insects, though details are lacking. It usually forages singly and only rarely joins mixed-species feeding flocks. It forages mostly in the forest's understory, often clinging to a low-level vertical stem, and takes food from vegetation with short sallies from a perch.

=== Breeding ===
The northern schiffornis' breeding season varies geographically. It includes May in Mexico, at least March to July in Belize, at least January to March in Guatemala, February to August in Costa Rica, and July in Ecuador. Its nest is a large cup made from dead leaves and their skeletons and lined with rootlets and fungal rhizomorphs; the female builds it. It typically is only about 0.5 to 1.8 m (2 to 6 ft) above the ground in a palm, on a stump, or in a vine tangle or epiphyte. The clutch is two eggs that are pale buff with black, brown, and lilac-gray markings. The female alone incubates, for about 20 to 21 days, and alone provisions nestlings. The time to fledging is not known.

=== Vocalization ===
The northern schiffornis sings mostly in the early morning. Its song is a variable "sequence of normally 2–4 clear, rich musical whistles, last one sharply upslurred". It is written as "deeeeeu whee-chee or sometimes two-note dweeeer weet" in Mexico, "twick-sweet-twee" on the Panama/Colombia border, and "a very slow teeeeu, weee-tí or teeeeeew tui-chuEEE?" in Ecuador.

== Status ==
The IUCN has assessed the northern schiffornis as being of Least Concern. It has a very large range; its estimated population of at least 50,000 mature individuals is believed to be decreasing. No immediate threats have been identified. In Costa Rica it is considered "fairly common" on the Pacific slope, "fairly uncommon" in the Caribbean-slope foothills, and "very uncommon" in the Caribbean lowlands. It is "uncommon to fairly common" in northern Central America, "locally fairly common" in Colombia, and fairly common in Ecuador. It occurs in many protected areas across its range.
