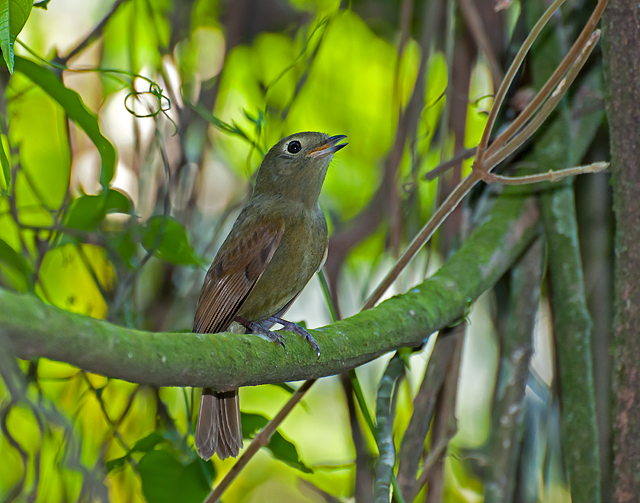
- Greenish schiffornis (Schiffornis virescens)

Scientific classification
- Kingdom: Animalia
- Phylum: Chordata
- Class: Aves
- Order: Passeriformes
- Family: Tityridae
- Subfamily: Tityrinae
- Genus: Schiffornis; Bonaparte, 1854

Type species
- Muscicapa turdina Wied-Neuwied, 1831

= Schiffornis =

Genus of birds

Schiffornis is a genus of South American bird in the family Tityridae. It has traditionally been placed in the manakin family, but evidence strongly suggest it is better placed in Tityridae, where now placed by SACC. In addition to schiffornis, they are sometimes referred to as mourners; a name shared with members of the genera Laniocera, Laniisoma and Rhytipterna.

== Taxonomy ==
The genus Schiffornis was introduced in 1854 by the French naturalist Charles Lucien Bonaparte. Although Bonaparte listed three species in his new genus, two of these were undescribed and therefore nomina nuda. The remaining species, Muscicapa turdina Wied-Neuwied, 1831, the brown-winged schiffornis, becomes the type species of the genus by virtual monotypy. The genus name Schiffornis combines the last name of the German physiologist Moritz Schiff with the Ancient Greek ορνις/ornis, ορνιθος/ornithos meaning "bird".

== Species ==
The genus contains seven species.

Image	Scientific name	Common name	Distribution
	Schiffornis major	Varzea schiffornis	Bolivia, Brazil, Colombia, Ecuador, Peru; also regions of Venezuela
	Schiffornis turdina	Brown-winged schiffornis	Amazonia and eastern Brazil.
	Schiffornis stenorhyncha	Russet-winged schiffornis	from Panama to northern Colombia and northern Venezuela.
	Schiffornis aenea	Foothill schiffornis	central Ecuador and northern Peru
	Schiffornis veraepacis	Northern schiffornis	southeast Mexico to western Colombia and Venezuela.
	Schiffornis olivacea	Guianan schiffornis	southeast Venezuela to Guyana and north central Brazil.
	Schiffornis virescens	Greenish schiffornis	southern Brazil, also eastern Paraguay, and extreme northeastern Argentina
