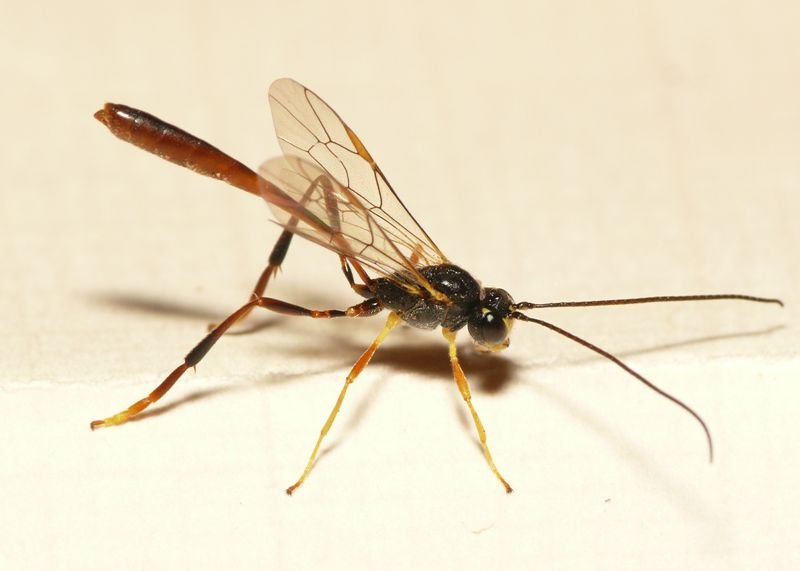

Scientific classification
- Domain: Eukaryota
- Kingdom: Animalia
- Phylum: Arthropoda
- Class: Insecta
- Order: Hymenoptera
- Family: Ichneumonidae
- Genus: Agrypon
- Species: A. flaveolatum

Binomial name
- Agrypon flaveolatum (Gravenhorst, 1807)

Synonyms
- Agrypon septentrionale (Holmgren, 1857); Agrypon arquatum (Gravenhorst, 1829); Agrypon cribrator (Thunberg, 1822); Agrypon laedator (Thunberg, 1822)

= Agrypon flaveolatum =

Species of wasp

Agrypon flaveolatum is a species of parasitoid wasp belonging to the family Ichneumonidae described by Johann Ludwig Christian Gravenhorst in 1807. It is a parasite of the larva of the winter moth (Operophtera brumata), and has been used in biological pest control to control this moth, whose larvae feed on foliage and defoliate trees.

== Ecology ==
Agrypon flaveolatum is native to Europe and Asia where it is a parasitoid of geometrid moths. When the winter moth (Operophtera brumata) was accidentally introduced into Nova Scotia, Canada, in the 1920s, it caused the damage and death of many native trees by defoliation. In 1949 it was declared to be an invasive pest species and six species of parasitic insects were imported from Europe in an attempt to control it. Two of these insects became established in Nova Scotia, the fly Cyzenis albicans as well as A. flaveolatum. Although they were unable to prevent the winter moth from spreading to other areas, they are likely to accompany their host to new locations and may reduce the rate at which it spreads. In 1954, in a study area, each tree was associated with more than a thousand adult winter moths, but by 1963, fewer than one moth per tree was present, a good example of classical biological control.

Another outbreak of winter moths occurred on Vancouver Island in British Columbia, Canada, where it was accompanied by the bruce spanworm (Operophtera bruceata). Here, at high densities the winter moth was controlled by the fly and the parasitoid wasp, but at low densities, a more important factor seems to have been the native beetles that ate the moth pupae. When an outbreak of winter moths occurred in the US state of Massachusetts in the first decade of the 21st century, the fly was the biological control of choice because it was feared that the wasp might parasitize other geometrid moths, of which there were about a dozen rare species in the state.
