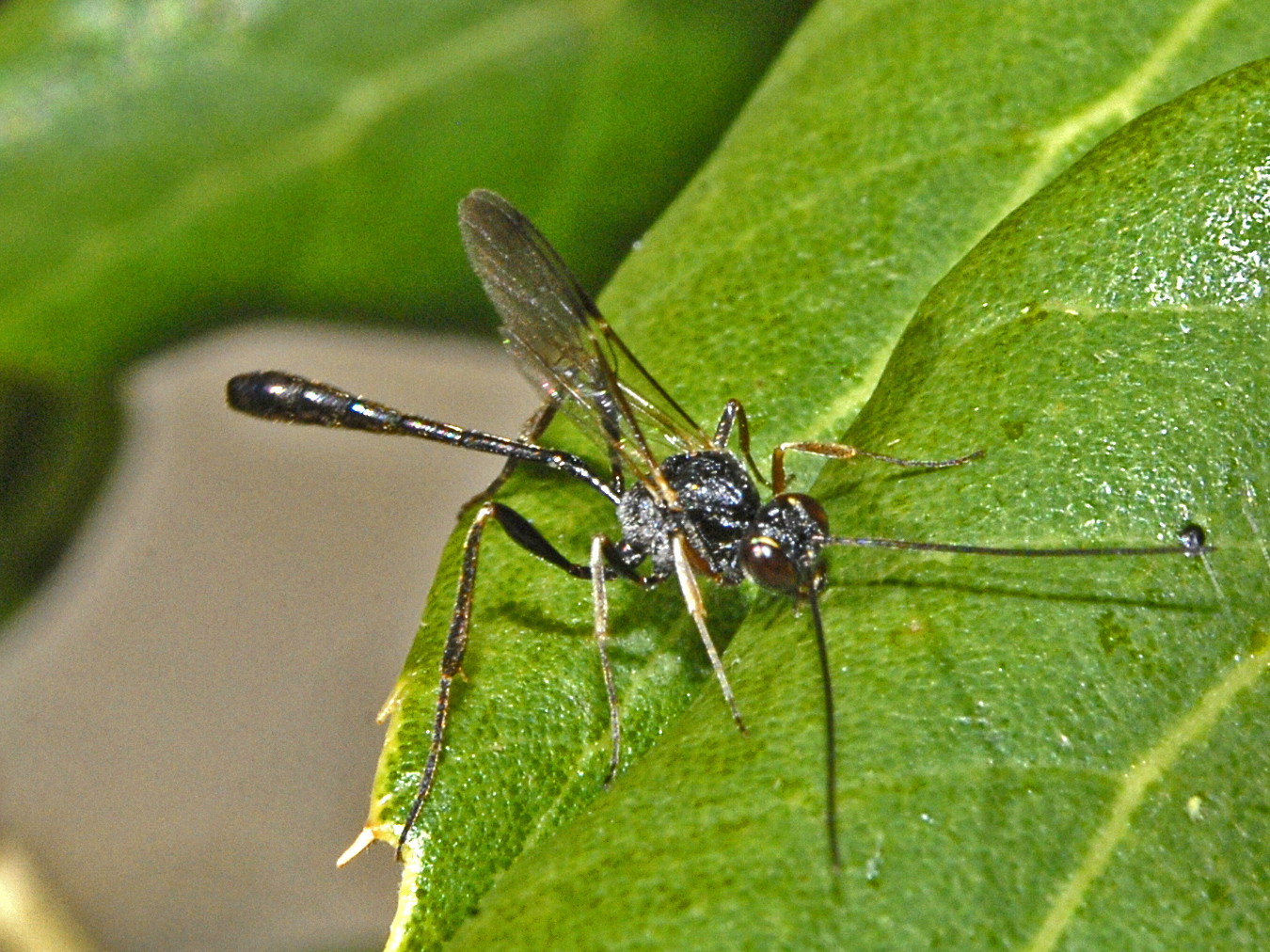
- Anomalon cruentatum, male

Scientific classification
- Kingdom: Animalia
- Phylum: Arthropoda
- Clade: Pancrustacea
- Class: Insecta
- Order: Hymenoptera
- Family: Ichneumonidae
- Genus: Anomalon
- Species: A. cruentatum

Binomial name
- Anomalon cruentatum (Geoffroy, 1785)

Synonyms
- Anomalon cruentatum Panzer, 1804; Anomalon epiphanii Izquierdo, 1977; Anomalon flavoorbitale (Cameron, 1907); Anomalon foliator (Fabricius, 1798); Anomalon humerale (Brullé, 1832); Anomalon nigerrimum (Strobl, 1904); Anomalon petiolatum (Geoffroy, 1785); Anomalon rufoorbitale (Cameron, 1906); Ichneumon cruentatum Geoffroy, 1785

= Anomalon cruentatum =

Species of wasp

Anomalon cruentatum is a species of parasitoid wasps belonging to the family Ichneumonidae.

== Description ==
Anomalon cruentatum can reach a body length of 10–14 millimetres (0.39–0.55 in), while the front wings reach 2.8–8.3 millimetres (0.11–0.33 in). Body is mainly black in males, while in females head and thorax are reddish (hence the species name cruentatum, meaning bloody). Abdomen is slender and propodeum is reticulated. Clypeus is rounded at apex. A rugose area is present in the notauli. Antennae are black. Legs are yellowish brown, with a white base of hind tibia. These wasps are koinobiont endoparasitoids of larvae of Tenebrionidae or moths in the superfamily Noctuoidea. Reported host species are Agrotis ipsilon, Gonocephalum rusticum, Cerura palestinensis, and Ptilodon capucina.

== Distribution and habitat ==
These wasps are present in most of Europe, in the Near East, in North Africa, and in the Oriental realm. They mainly occur in dry habitats.
