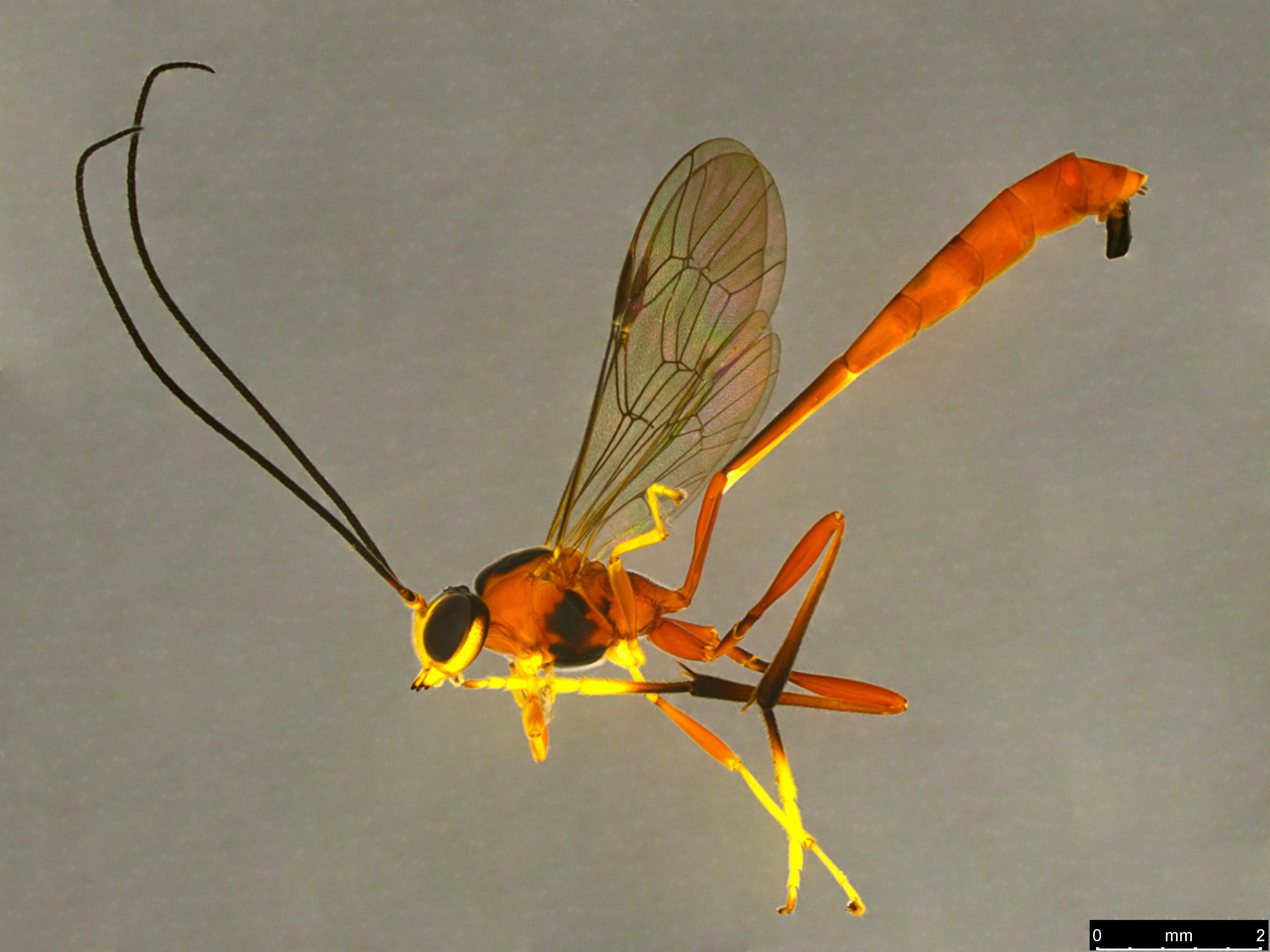
- Adult male specimen of Habronyx victorianus

Scientific classification
- Kingdom: Animalia
- Phylum: Arthropoda
- Class: Insecta
- Order: Hymenoptera
- Family: Ichneumonidae
- Subfamily: Anomaloninae
- Tribe: Gravenhorstiini
- Genus: Habronyx; Förster, 1868

= Habronyx =

Genus of wasps

Habronyx is a genus of parasitoid wasps belonging to the family Ichneumonidae. The species of this genus are found in Europe, Australia, and North and South America.

== Distribution ==
Habronyx species are found in most realms, with the exception of the Afrotropical realm.

== Reproduction ==
Habronyx adults lay their eggs inside Lepidopteran larvae (i.e. caterpillars) by piercing them with their ovipositor. Habronyx eggs consist of an equatorial disc and a caudal stalk. It's thought that the shape is adapted to attach the egg to the inside of the caterpillar's integument. Once the eggs hatch, the Habronyx larvae consume the caterpillar from the inside. They emerge from the deceased caterpillar as adults.

== Description ==
The adult of most Habronyx species are generally about 30 mm (1.2 in) in length.

Like all ichneumons, the genitals of the male Habronyx consists of a capsule formed by two lateral gonosquamae. The membraneous part of the aedeagus is covered in small spines; Habryonx shares this feature with several other genera but some genera have a smooth aedeagus.

== Species ==
- Habronyx aclerivorus (Rohwer, 1915)
- Habronyx albifrons (Spinola, 1851)
- Habronyx amoenus Dasch, 1984
- Habronyx ariasae Gauld & Bradshaw, 1997
- Habronyx atropos Gauld, 1976
- Habronyx australasiae (Morley, 1913)
- Habronyx baibarense (Uchida, 1928)
- Habronyx baibarensis (Uchida, 1928)
- Habronyx carmonai Gauld & Bradshaw, 1997
- Habronyx citrinus Porter, 2007
- Habronyx clothos Gauld, 1976
- Habronyx coarctatus (Ashmead, 1900)
- Habronyx columbianus Dasch, 1984
- Habronyx discoidellus (Sonan, 1930)
- Habronyx edwardsii (Cresson, 1879)
- Habronyx elegans (Shestakov, 1923)
- Habronyx flavistigma Davis, 1898
- Habronyx flavus (Alvarado, 2015) (subgenus Camposcopus)
- Habronyx foveolatus Dasch, 1984
- Habronyx fulvipes (Townes, Momoi & Townes, 1965) - taxon renamed from Habronyx Chinesis (Uchida 1955)
- Habronyx heros (Wesmael, 1849)
- Habronyx insidiator (Smith, 1874)
- Habronyx lachesis Gauld, 1976
- Habronyx latens (Brues, 1910)
- Habronyx limbatus Dasch, 1984
- Habronyx luteopectus (Norton, 1863)
- Habronyx magniceps (Cresson, 1872)
- Habronyx majorocellus Wang, 1989
- Habronyx minutus Ward, 2015
- Habronyx neomexicanus Dasch, 1984
- Habronyx nigricornis (Wesmael, 1849)
- Habronyx nigrifrons (Alvarado, 2015) subgenus Habronyx
- Habronyx oregonus Dasch, 1984
- Habronyx pammi Gauld, 1976
- Habronyx peltatus Dasch, 1984
- Habronyx perspicuus (Wesmael, 1849)
- Habronyx perturbans (Morley, 1913)
- Habronyx punensis Porter, 2007
- Habronyx pyretorum (Cameron, 1912)
- Habronyx regalis (Morley, 1913)
- Habronyx robustus (Morley, 1913)
- Habronyx saqsaywaman (Alvarado, 2015) subgenus Habronyx
- Habronyx severini Dasch, 1984
- Habronyx sonani (Uchida, 1958)
- Habronyx subinsidiator Wang, 1985
- Habronyx sulcator (Morley, 1913)
- Habronyx tonnaiensis (Uchida, 1929)
- Habronyx trilineatus (Cameron, 1906)
- Habronyx victorianus (Morley, 1913)
