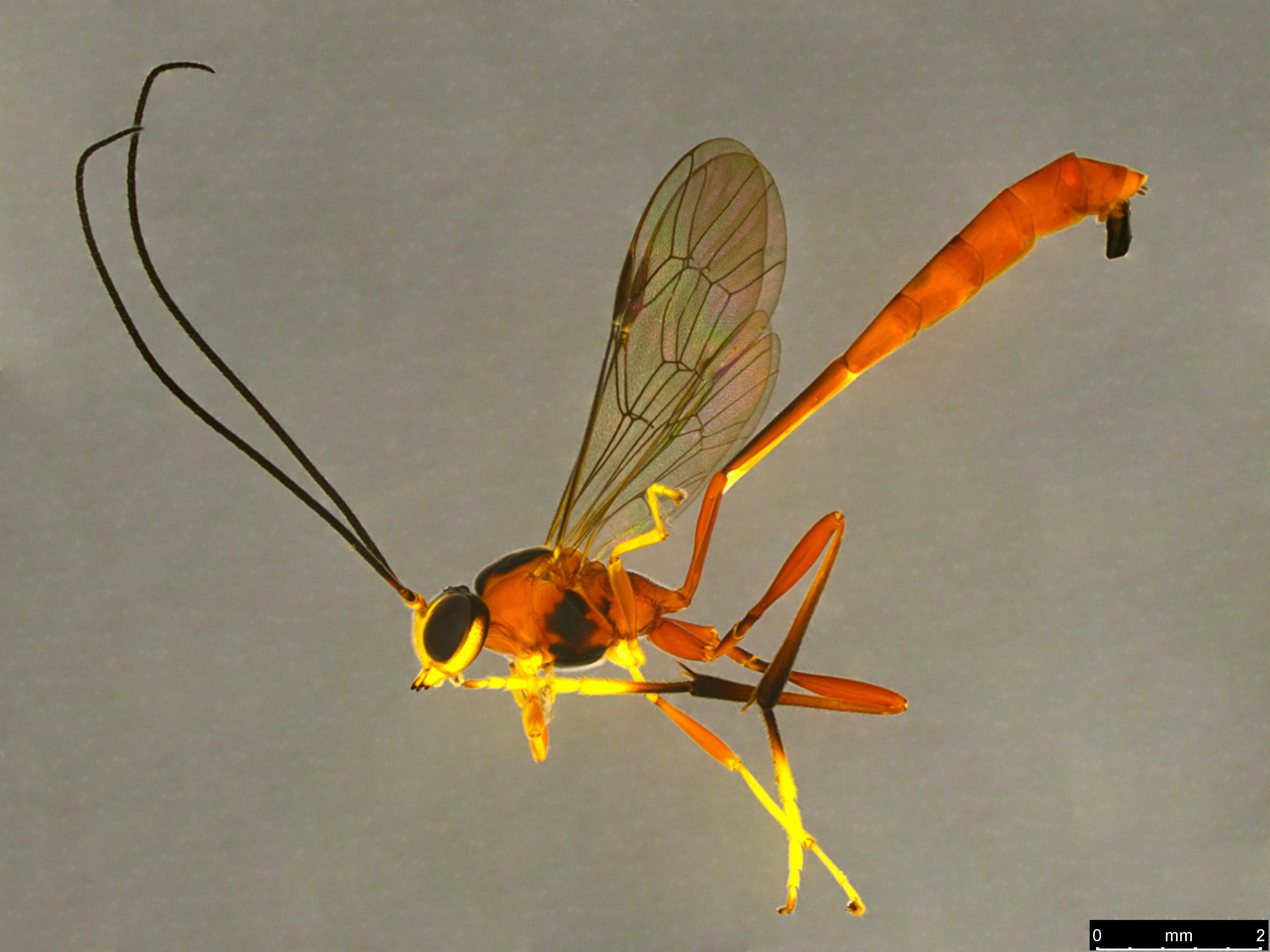
- Adult male specimen

Scientific classification
- Kingdom: Animalia
- Phylum: Arthropoda
- Class: Insecta
- Order: Hymenoptera
- Family: Ichneumonidae
- Genus: Habronyx
- Species: H. victorianus

Binomial name
- Habronyx victorianus (Morley, 1913)

= Habronyx victorianus =

Species of Wasp

Habronyx victorianus is a species of parasitic wasp. It was described by Morley in 1913. The species is named after the state of Victoria in Australia where it was first identified.
