= Habronyx fulvipes =

Scientific classification
- Domain: Eukaryota
- Kingdom: Animalia
- Phylum: Arthropoda
- Class: Insecta
- Order: Hymenoptera
- Family: Ichneumonidae
- Genus: Habronyx
- Species: H. fulvipes

Binomial name
- Habronyx fulvipes Townes, Momoi and Townes 1965

Synonyms
- Habronyx chinensis Uchida, 1955 Exochilum Chinense Morley, 1913

Species of wasp

Habronyx fulvipes is a species of parasitic ichneumon wasp. It was renamed by Townes, Momoi and Townes in 1965 (fulvipes meaning, yellow legs); prior to that the species had been named Habronyx chinensis, chinensis meaning "China", in 1955 by Japanese entomologist Toichi Uchida. The holotype and allotype were collected by R. Mell. The species was first named Exochilum Chinense by Morley in 1913.

== Reproduction ==
Like other members of the genus, H. fulvipes adults lay their eggs inside Lepidopteran larvae (i.e. caterpillars) by piercing them with their ovipositor. The host range of H. fulvipes is unknown as little is known about their ecology. H. fulvipes eggs consist of an equatorial disc and a caudal stalk, making them look a bit like the cartoon oil lamp from Aladdin. It's thought that the shape is adapted to attach the egg to the inside of the caterpillar's integument. Once the eggs hatch, the H. fulvipes larvae consume the caterpillar from the inside. They emerge from the deceased caterpillar as adults.

== Description ==
H. fulvipes is primarily found in China. It is similar to the species Habronyx insidiator from Japan, but the head is slightly narrower than the thorax. The hind thighs are red, and the tibiae are darker at the tip. The second and last tergites are mottled with blackish spots. The mesothorax on both sides, tegulen, shoulders, wing roots, front of the prothorax, and propodeum at the end, are partially red. The body is slimmer and smaller, about 30mm in length.
