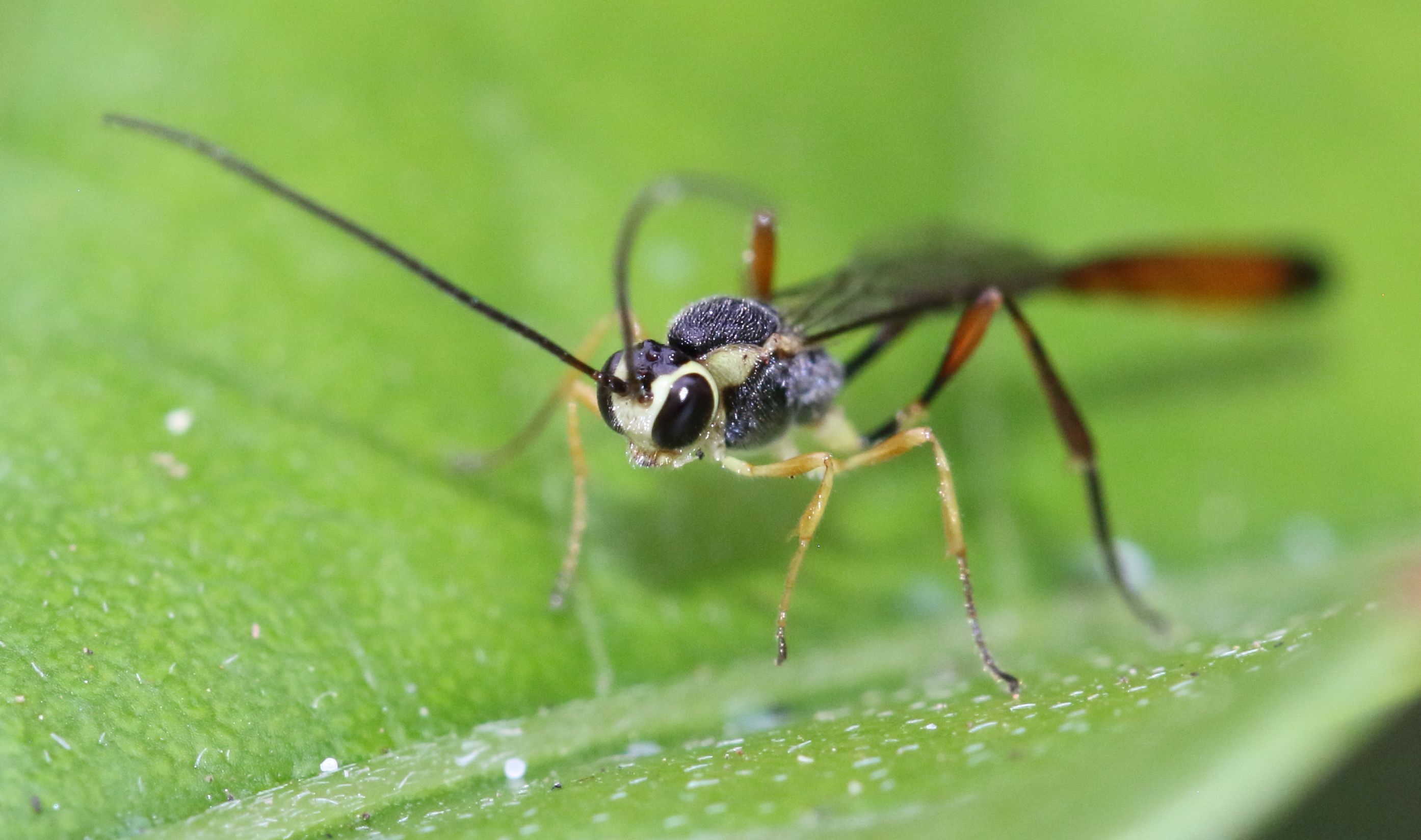
- Trichomma albicoxum adult

Scientific classification
- Domain: Eukaryota
- Kingdom: Animalia
- Phylum: Arthropoda
- Class: Insecta
- Order: Hymenoptera
- Family: Ichneumonidae
- Tribe: Gravenhorstiini
- Genus: Trichomma; Wesmael, 1849

= Trichomma =

Genus of insects

Trichomma is a genus of parasitoid wasps belonging to the family Ichneumonidae.

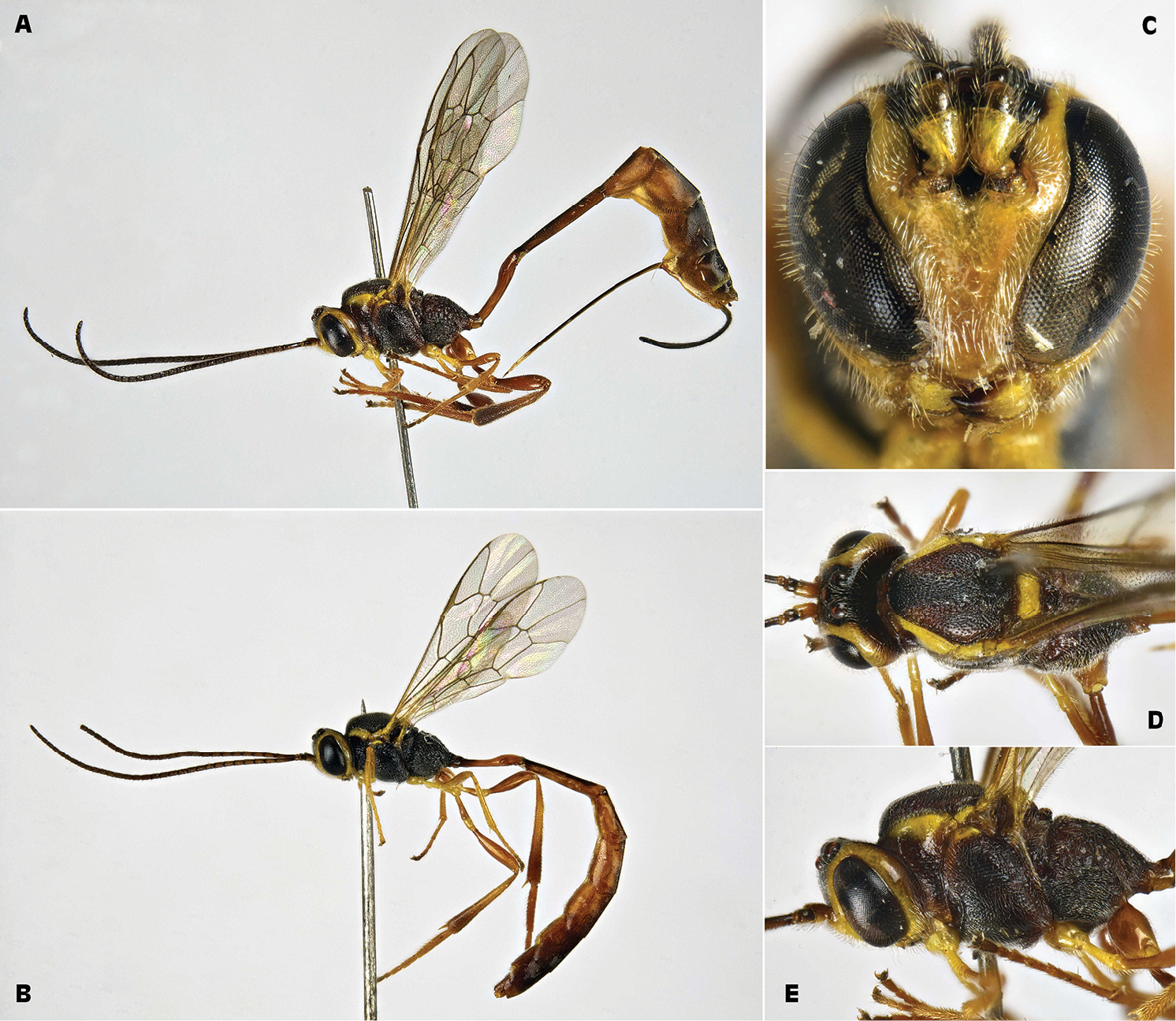
Trichomma enecator

The genus has an almost cosmopolitan distribution.

== Species ==
- Trichomma albicoxum (Morley, 1913)
- Trichomma atrum (Dasch, 1984
- Trichomma babai (Uchida, 1958)
- Trichomma batistai (Gauld & Bradshaw, 1997)
- Trichomma biroi (Szepligeti, 1906)
- Trichomma cheesmanae (Gauld, 1978)
- Trichomma clavipes (Krieger, 1904)
- Trichomma cnaphalocrocis (Uchida, 1928)
- Trichomma conjunctum (Wang, 1997)
- Trichomma cornula (Wang, 1985)
- Trichomma decorum (Cameron, 1897)
- Trichomma dioryctri (Gauld, 1976)
- Trichomma enecator (Rossi, 1790)
- Trichomma fujianense (Wang, 1985)
- Trichomma fulvidens (Wesmael, 1849)
- Trichomma fumeum (Dasch, 1984)
- Trichomma guilinense (Wang, 1985)
- Trichomma insulare (Szepligeti, 1910)
- Trichomma intermedium (Krieger, 1904)
- Trichomma koreanum (Lee & Kim, 1983)
- Trichomma lepidum (Wang, 1988)
- Trichomma maceratum (Cresson, 1879)
- Trichomma nigricans (Cameron, 1905)
- Trichomma occisor (Habermehl, 1909)
- Trichomma pacificum (Gauld, 1978)
- Trichomma politum (Dasch, 1984)
- Trichomma reticulatum (Davis, 1898)
- Trichomma shennongicum (Wang, 1985)
- Trichomma spatia (Wang, 1997)
- Trichomma subnigricans (Wang, 1985)
