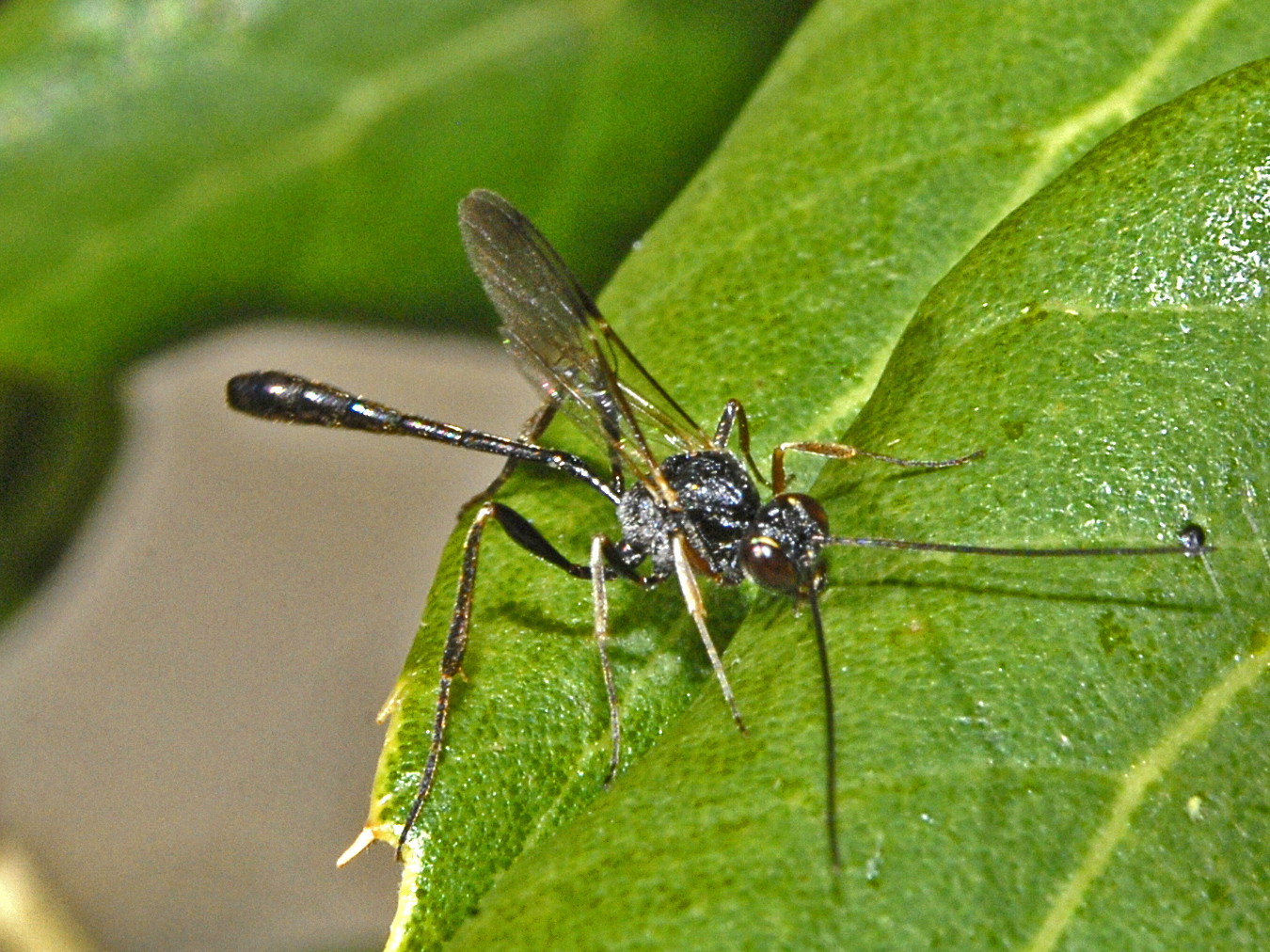
- Anomalon cruentatum

Scientific classification
- Kingdom: Animalia
- Phylum: Arthropoda
- Class: Insecta
- Order: Hymenoptera
- Family: Ichneumonidae
- Subfamily: Anomaloninae
- Tribe: Anomalonini; Viereck, 1918
- Genus: Anomalon; Panzer, 1804

Synonyms
- Anomalum Schulz, 1906; Erythrophion Cameron, 1906; Microcremastus Hedwig, 1961; Neogreeneia Viereck, 1912; Nototrachys Marshall, 1872; Ophiononeura Cameron, 1904; Pseudonototrachys Meyer, 1930; Stictophion Cameron, 1906; Trachyopterus Morley, 1912; Ochlerus Gistel, 1848 nec Spinola, 1837

= Anomalon (wasp) =

Genus of wasps

Anomalon is a large genus of parasitoid wasps belonging to the family Ichneumonidae. This may be the only genus in the tribe Anomalonini, although Neogreeneia Viereck, 1912 is sometimes considered a valid genus of the tribe.

These wasps are present worldwide, but most diverse in tropical regions. Twenty species are recorded from Costa Rica. In the Africa and the Middle East, they are well represented in dry habitats, but in the Americas are most common in very wet rain forests. Recorded hosts include tenebrionid or elaterid beetle larvae and noctuid and tortricid moth larvae.

== Description ==
"The species of Anomalon can easily be recognized from other Anomaloninae by the combination of the following morphological features:

- notaulus indistinct, represented by a rugose area;
- fore wing with r-m joining 2/M distal to 2m-cu;
- hind wing with distal abscissa of 2/Cu entirely absent;
- epipleurum of third metasomal tergite separated by a crease just below the spiracle;
- mid tibia with a single apical spur."

== Selected species ==
Species within this genus include:

- Anomalon arcuatum Dasch, 1984
- Anomalon arizonicum Dasch, 1984
- Anomalon canadense (Cresson, 1879)
- Anomalon constrictum Dasch, 1984
- Anomalon coreanum (Uchida, 1928)
- Anomalon cruentatum (Geoffroy, 1785)
- Anomalon curvatum Dasch, 1984
- Anomalon ejuncidum Say, 1836
- Anomalon exrufum Walkley, 1958
- Anomalon floridanum Dasch, 1984
- Anomalon fuscipenne (Tosquinet, 1900)
- Anomalon glabrumm Dasch, 1984
- Anomalon japonicum (Uchida, 1928)
- Anomalon kozlovi (Kokujev, 1915)
- Anomalon kurumensis Kusigemati, 1983
- Anomalon kusigematii Momoi, 1968
- Anomalon laterale Brulle, 1846
- Anomalon montanum Dasch, 1984
- Anomalon nigribase Cushman, 1937
- Anomalon nigritum Norton, 1863
- Anomalon ocellatum Dasch, 1984
- Anomalon picticornis (Viereck, 1912)
- Anomalon reticulatum Cresson, 1865
- Anomalon victorovi Momoi, 1968
- Anomalon vivum Cresson, 1879
- Anomalon yoshiyasui Kusigemati, 1985
