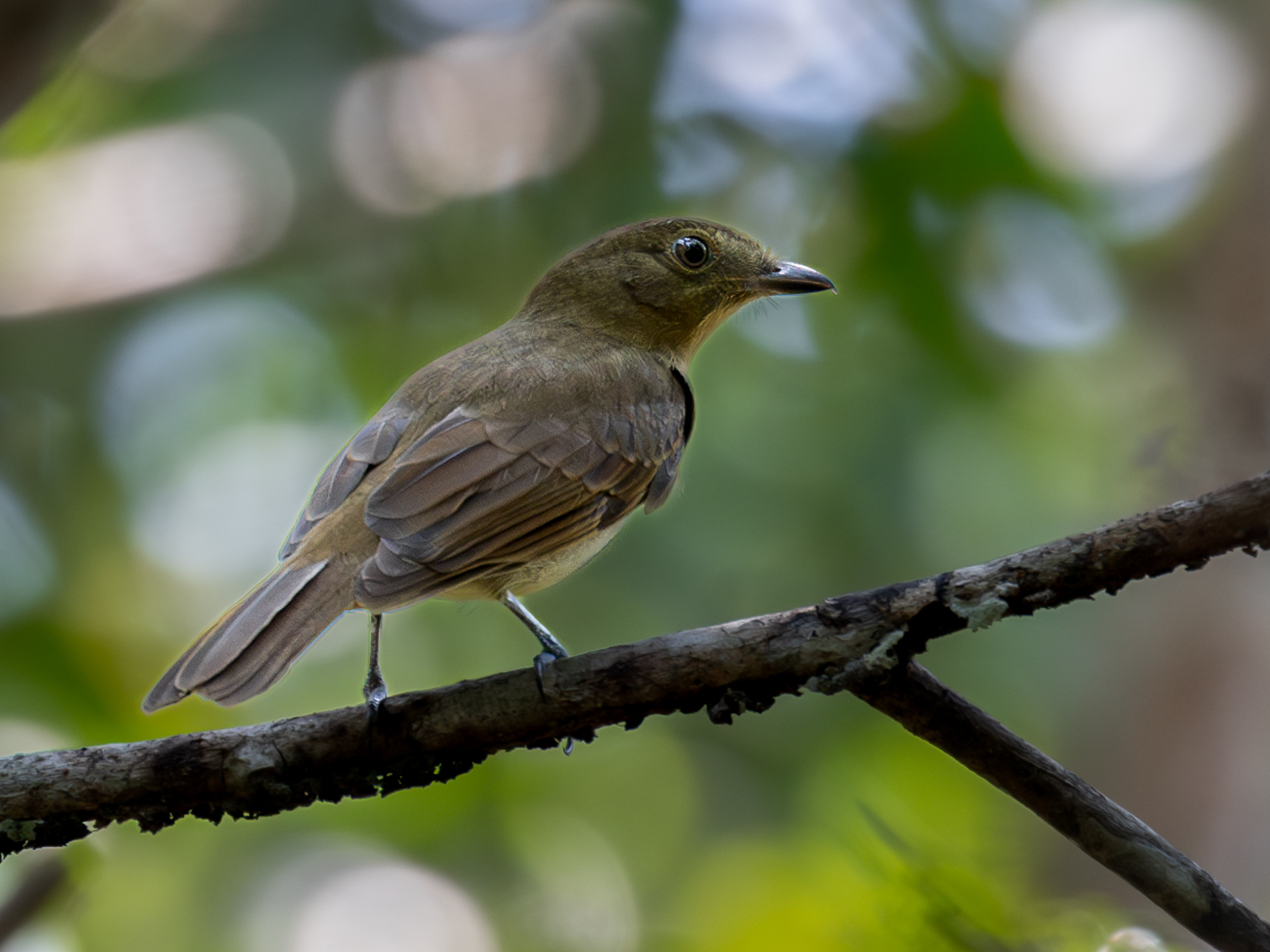

Conservation status
- Least Concern (IUCN 3.1)

Scientific classification
- Kingdom: Animalia
- Phylum: Chordata
- Class: Aves
- Order: Passeriformes
- Family: Tityridae
- Genus: Schiffornis
- Species: S. olivacea

Binomial name
- Schiffornis olivacea (Ridgway, 1906)

= Guianan schiffornis =

Species of bird

The Guianan schiffornis (Schiffornis olivacea), also called the olivaceous schiffornis and olivaceous mourner, is a species of Neotropical bird in the family Tityridae, the tityras, becards, and allies. It is found in Brazil, French Guiana, Guyana, Suriname, and Venezuela.

== Taxonomy and systematics ==
The northern schiffornis was originally described in 1906 as Scotothorus olivaceus. In about 1920 the species was moved into Schiffornis. For much of the twentieth century Schiffornis was placed in the manakin family Pipridae and its species were called manakins. Several early twenty-first century studies confirmed the placement of Schiffornis in Tityridae and taxonomic systems made the reassignment. In 1998 the American Ornithological Society was unsure where to place the genus and listed its members as incertae sedis but in 2011 moved them to Tityridae.

What is now the Guianan schiffornis was eventually treated as a subspecies of what was then called the thrush-like manakin and later called the thrush-like schiffornis, Schiffornis turdina. Since at least the late twentieth century taxonomists had suspected that several species were embedded within Schiffornis turdina. Studies published in 2007 and 2011 confirmed that S. turdina was polyphyletic. Following these studies taxonomists separated the Guianan schiffornis and three other species from S. turdina, and gave the reduced species its current English name of brown-winged schiffornis. The process began in 2012 and took at least until 2016 for the major taxonomic systems to implement.

The Guianan schiffornis is monotypic.

== Description ==
The Guianan schiffornis is 15.5 to 16.5 cm (6.1 to 6.5 in) long and weighs 28 to 37 g (0.99 to 1.3 oz). The sexes have the same plumage. Adults have an indistinct pale ring around the eye on an otherwise brownish olive face. Their upperparts and tail are brownish olive. Their wings are slightly browner. Their throat and breast are brownish and their belly and vent grayish olive. They have a dark iris.

== Distribution and habitat ==
The Guianan schiffornis is found from Bolívar and Delta Amacuro states in eastern Venezuela east through the Guianas and northern Brazil; in the last it is found north of the Amazon from the lower Negro River to the Atlantic in Amapá. It primarily inhabits the interior of humid and wet forest; it also is found, though rarely, at the forest edge and in mature secondary forest. It is mostly a bird of the lowlands but has been heard at about 1,450 m (4,800 ft) in the Sierra de Lema in Bolívar.

== Behavior ==
=== Movement ===
The Guianan schiffornis is believed to be a year-round resident.

=== Feeding ===
The Guianan schiffornis feeds on fruits and insects, though details are lacking. It usually forages singly and only rarely joins mixed-species feeding flocks. It forages mostly in the forests's understory, often clinging to a low-level vertical stem, and takes food from vegetation with short sallies from a perch.

=== Breeding ===
The Guianan schiffornis' breeding season has not been fully defined but is believed to include April, August, and September in Guyana and January and February in Suriname. Its one known nest was in a cavity in a palm stump about 1.5 m (5 ft) above the ground. The cavity was lined with dead leaves and plant fibers. It contained two eggs that were buffy white with slate-black and lilac-gray spots. The incubation period, time to fledging, and details of parental care are not known.

=== Vocalization ===
The Guianan schiffornis' song is a "long note, upslurred at end, and [a] very brief note...teeeeu, wheeeu-wheé-tu".

== Status ==
The IUCN has assessed the Guianan schiffornis as being of Least Concern. It has a large range; its population size is not known and is believed to be decreasing. No immediate threats have been identified. It is considered fairly common to uncommon across its range and is found in many protected areas.
