= Habrocampulum =

Scientific classification
- Kingdom: Animalia
- Phylum: Arthropoda
- Class: Insecta
- Order: Hymenoptera
- Family: Ichneumonidae
- Tribe: Gravenhorstiini
- Genus: Habrocampulum; Gauld, 1976

Genus of wasps

Habrocampulum is a genus of parasitoid wasps belonging to the family Ichneumonidae.

The species of this genus are found in Europe.

Species:

- Habrocampulum biguttatum (Gravenhorst, 1829)
- Habrocampulum shikaribetsensis Uchida, 1958
