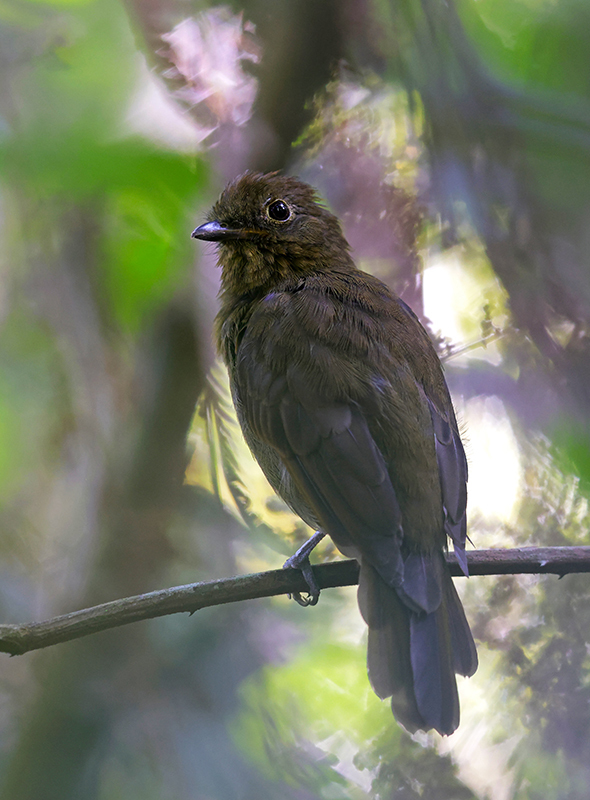

Conservation status
- Least Concern (IUCN 3.1)

Scientific classification
- Kingdom: Animalia
- Phylum: Chordata
- Class: Aves
- Order: Passeriformes
- Family: Tityridae
- Genus: Schiffornis
- Species: S. aenea

Binomial name
- Schiffornis aenea Zimmer, 1936

= Foothill schiffornis =

Species of bird

Flock of Schiffornis aenea chirping

The foothill schiffornis, or foothill mourner, (Schiffornis aenea) is a Neotropical species of bird in the family Tityridae, the tityras, becards, and allies. It is found in Colombia, Ecuador, and Peru.

== Taxonomy and systematics ==
For much of the twentieth century genus Schiffornis was placed in the manakin family Pipridae and its species were called manakins. Several early twenty-first century studies confirmed the placement of Schiffornis in Tityridae and taxonomic systems made the reassignment. In 1998 the American Ornithological Society was unsure where to place the genus and listed its members as incertae sedis but in 2011 moved them to Tityridae.

The foothill schiffornis was originally described in 1936 as Schiffornis turdinus aeneus, a subspecies of what was then called the thrush-like manakin and later called the thrush-like schiffornis. Since at least the late twentieth century taxonomists had suspected that several species were embedded within what was by then Schiffornis turdina. Studies published in 2007 and 2011 confirmed that S. turdina was polyphyletic. Following these studies taxonomists separated the foothill schiffornis and three other species from S. turdina, and gave the reduced species its current English name of brown-winged schiffornis. The process began in 2012 and took at least until 2016 for the major taxonomic systems to implement. (BirdLife International's Handbook of the Birds of the World calls all of the five species "mourner" rather than "schiffornis".)

The foothill schiffornis is monotypic.

== Description ==
The foothill schiffornis is 15.5 to 17.3 cm (6.1 to 6.8 in) long and weighs 28.5 to 31 g (1.0 to 1.1 oz). The sexes have the same plumage. Adults have an indistinct pale ring around the eye on an otherwise dark brownish olive face. Their upperparts and tail are dark brownish olive with a bronzy cast. Their wings are a warmer brown. Their throat and breast are brown with a golden tinge and their belly and vent grayish olive. They have a dark iris.

== Distribution and habitat ==
The foothill schiffornis is found primarily along the eastern slope of the Andes of Ecuador. Its range extends somewhat to the south into northern Peru and there is a single record from far southwestern Colombia. It inhabits the understory of primary and mature secondary forest. In elevation it ranges between 900 and 1,700 m (3,000 and 5,600 ft) in Ecuador; the Colombian record was at 1,200 m (3,900 ft).

== Behavior ==
=== Movement ===
The foothill schiffornis is believed to be a year-round resident.

=== Feeding ===
The foothill schiffornis feeds on fruits and insects, though details are lacking. It only rarely joins mixed-species feeding flocks. It forages mostly in the forests's understory and takes food from vegetation or in mid-air with short sallies from a perch.

=== Breeding ===
The foothill schiffornis' breeding season has not been defined but spans at least March to June. Nothing else is known about the species' breeding biology.

=== Vocalization ===
The foothill schiffornis' main vocalization is "a mournful deuu…teé’wOOee, tew-tew or hew EeuEE TU-hew, with the second note rising and then falling".

== Status ==
The IUCN has assessed the foothill schiffornis as being of Least Concern. It has a large range; its population size is not known and is believed to be decreasing. No immediate threats have been identified. It occurs in only a few protected areas. "Generally considered to be uncommon throughout its range, and is almost certainly declining due to ongoing deforestation and fragmentation in the foothills."
