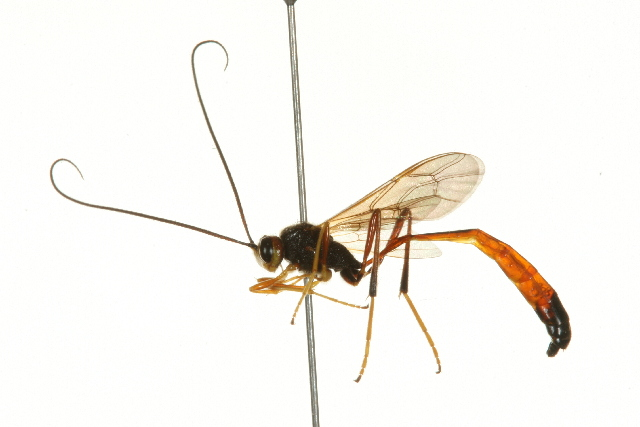
- Barylypa propugnator

Scientific classification
- Domain: Eukaryota
- Kingdom: Animalia
- Phylum: Arthropoda
- Class: Insecta
- Order: Hymenoptera
- Family: Ichneumonidae
- Tribe: Gravenhorstiini
- Genus: Barylypa; Förster, 1869

= Barylypa =

Genus of insects

Barylypa is a genus of parasitoid wasps belonging to the family Ichneumonidae.

The species of this genus are found in Europe and Northern America.

Species:

- Barylypa amabilis (Tosquinet, 1900)
- Barylypa andalusiaca (Strobl, 1904)
