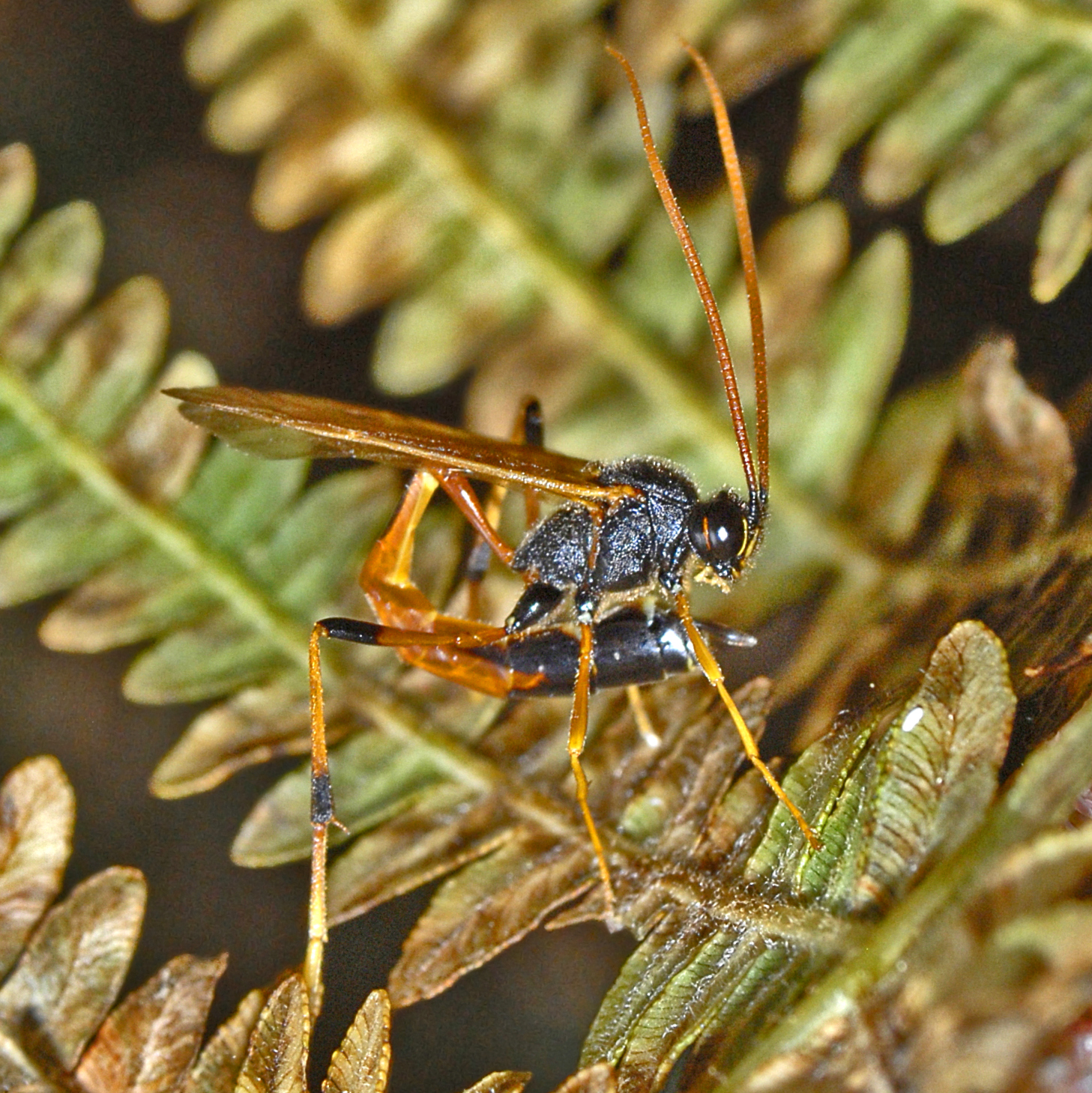

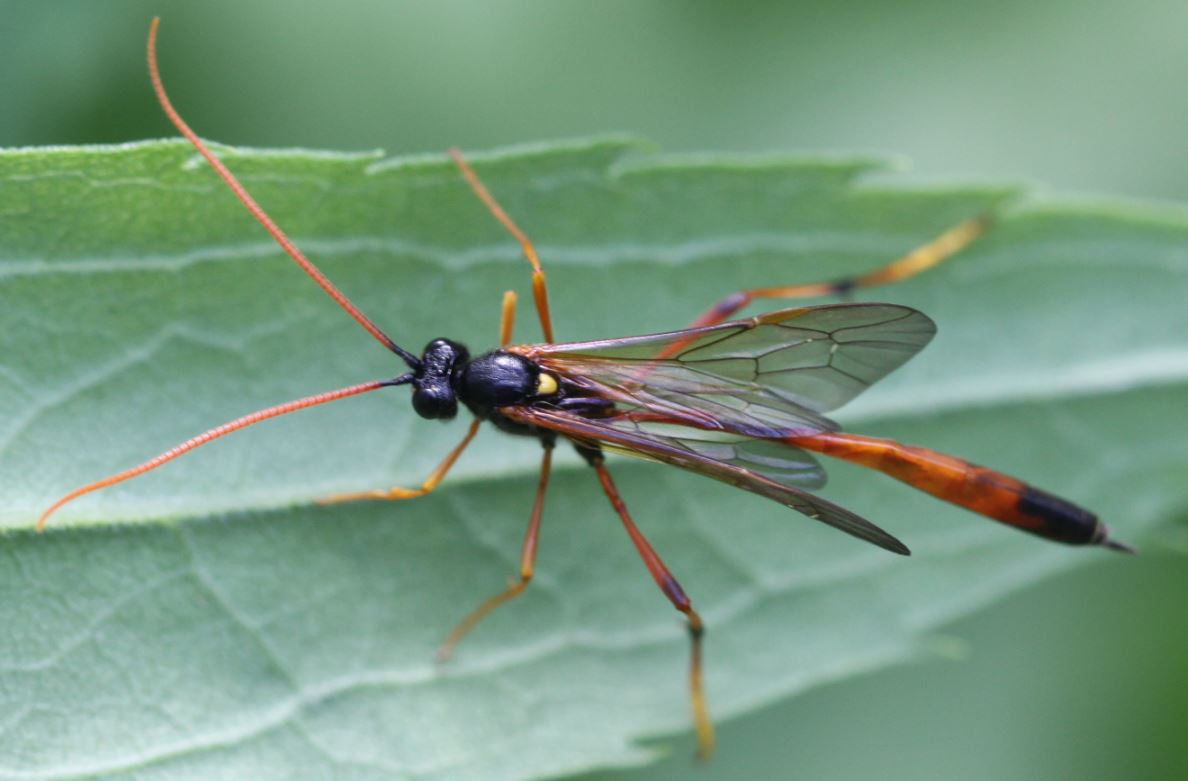

Scientific classification
- Kingdom: Animalia
- Phylum: Arthropoda
- Class: Insecta
- Order: Hymenoptera
- Family: Ichneumonidae
- Genus: Therion
- Species: T. circumflexum

Binomial name
- Therion circumflexum (Linnaeus, 1758)

Synonyms
- List: Therion callosum (Shestakov, 1923); Therion curticorne Bauer, 1967; Therion japonicum (Cameron, 1906); Therion laricis (Matsumura, 1926); Therion nigroscutellatum (Hellen, 1926); Therion nigroscutellatum (Uchida, 1928); Therion nigrum (Provancher, 1879); Therion nipponicum (Uchida, 1928); Therion occidentale (Cresson, 1879); Therion ramidulum (Christ, 1791) Therion rubropictum (Ulbricht, 1926); Therion unicolor (Ratzeburg, 1844)

= Therion circumflexum =

Species of wasp

Therion circumflexum is a species of ichneumon wasp in the family Ichneumonidae.

== Distribution ==
This species is widespread in large parts of the Palearctic realm (Europe, Asia, North Africa) and also occurs in the Nearctic realm (North America).

== Description ==
Therion circumflexum can reach a body length of approximately 14–25 millimetres (0.55–0.98 in). The head and thorax of these relatively large parasitic wasps are predominantly black. The scutellum is yellow. The abdomen is predominantly orange. Usually the rear end and the top of the third tergites are black. The female has a short spike. The legs are yellow-orange. The posterior femur and posterior tibia have a dark brown apical end. The wings are orange-hyaline. In the clypeus the median apical tooth is missing and the hind tarsal claws are evenly curved.

== Biology ==
The adult parasitoid wasps of this species fly from mid-June to September. They parasitize various moth species including small engrailed (Ectropis crepuscularia), privet hawk (Sphinx ligustri), pine hawk-moth (Sphinx pinastri), pebble prominent (Notodonta ziczac) and a number of owlet moths (Noctuidae). The female wasp lays its eggs in the caterpillars. The hatched larvae feed on the caterpillar and pupates later in a thin web.
