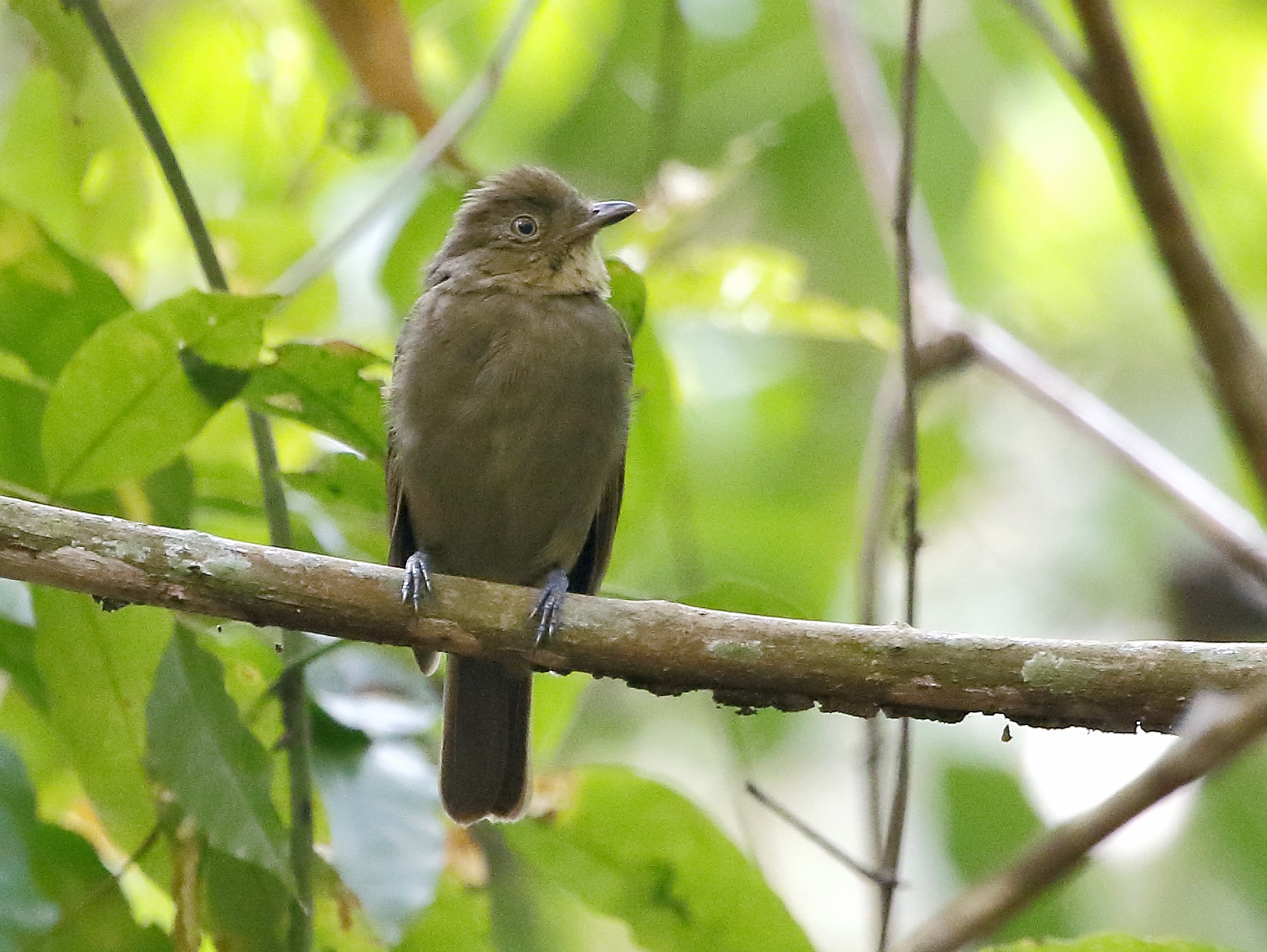

Conservation status
- Least Concern (IUCN 3.1)

Scientific classification
- Kingdom: Animalia
- Phylum: Chordata
- Class: Aves
- Order: Passeriformes
- Family: Tityridae
- Genus: Schiffornis
- Species: S. turdina

Binomial name
- Schiffornis turdina (Wied-Neuwied, 1831)

Synonyms
- Muscicapa turdina (protonym); Schiffornis turdinus

= Brown-winged schiffornis =

Species of bird

The brown-winged schiffornis, or brown-winged mourner, (Schiffornis turdina) is a species of Neotropical bird in the family Tityridae, the tityras, becards, and allies. It is found in Bolivia, Brazil, Colombia. Ecuador, Peru, and Venezuela.

== Taxonomy and systematics ==
The brown-winged schiffornis was originally described as Muscicapa turdina, erroneously placing it among the Old World flycatchers. For much of the twentieth century Schiffornis was placed in the manakin family Pipridae and its species were called manakins. Several early twenty-first century studies confirmed the placement of Schiffornis in Tityridae and taxonomic systems made the reassignment. In 1998 the American Ornithological Society was unsure where to place the genus and listed its members as incertae sedis but in 2011 moved them to Tityridae.

The brown-winged schiffornis' binomial Schiffornis turdina long applied to a species called the thrush-like manakin and later the thrush-like schiffornis. Since at least the late twentieth century taxonomists had suspected that several species were embedded within it. Studies published in 2007 and 2011 confirmed that Schiffornis turdina was polyphyletic. Following these studies taxonomists separated the northern schiffornis (S. veraepacis), russet-winged schiffornis (S. stenorhyncha), Guianan (or olivaceous) schiffornis (S. olivacea), and foothill schiffornis (S. aenea) from S. turdina, and gave the reduced species its current English name. The process began in 2012 and took at least until 2016 for the major taxonomic systems to implement. (BirdLife International's Handbook of the Birds of the World calls all of the five species "mourner" rather than "schiffornis".)

The splits left the brown-winged schiffornis with these five subspecies:

- S. t. amazonum (Sclater, PL, 1861)
- S. t. wallacii (Sclater, PL & Salvin, 1867)
- S. t. steinbachi Todd, 1928
- S. t. intermedia Pinto, 1954
- S. t. turdina (Wied-Neuwied, 1831)

== Description ==
The brown-winged schiffornis is 15.5 to 16.5 cm (6.1 to 6.5 in) long and weighs about 22 to 38 g (0.78 to 1.3 oz). The sexes have the same plumage. Adults of the nominate subspecies S. t. turdina have an indistinct pale ring around the eye on an otherwise brownish olive face. Their upperparts and tail are dull brownish olive. Their wings are dull brownish olive with rufescent feather edges. Their breast is a lighter brownish olive-gray and their belly and vent pale olive-gray.

The other subspecies of the brown-winged schiffornis differ from the nominate and each other thus:

- S. t. amazonum: rufescent tinge on crown, less brown (more olive) upperparts than nominate, some tawny on the throat, and more grayish underparts
- S. t. wallacii: like amazonum but paler overall and a very pale belly
- S. t. steinbachi: smaller than nominate but otherwise similar
- S. t. intermedia: smaller than nominate but otherwise similar

All subspecies have a brown to dark brown iris, a blackish bill, and olive grayish legs and feet.

== Distribution and habitat ==
The brown-winged schiffornis has a disjunct distribution. The subspecies are found thus:

- S. t. amazonum: from southeastern Colombia and Amazonas in southern Venezuela south through far eastern Ecuador, most of eastern Peru, and western Brazil to the Negro River and northwestern Mato Grosso
- S. t. wallacii: Amazonian Brazil south of the Amazon from the Tapajós and lower Teles Pires rivers east to the Atlantic in Maranhão
- S. t. steinbachi: southeastern Peru and northern Bolivia
- S. t. intermedia: Paraíba, Pernambuco, and Alagoas in far eastern Brazil
- S. t. turdina: southeastern Brazil from southern Bahia south to Espírito Santo

The brown-winged schiffornis primarily inhabits the interior of humid forest; it also is found, though rarely, at the forest edge, in secondary forest, and in drier forest. It elevation it reaches 800 m (2,600 ft) in Venezuela, 300 m (1,000 ft) in Ecuador, 1,500 m (4,900 ft) in Peru, and 1,000 m (3,300 ft) in Brazil.

== Behavior ==
=== Movement ===
The brown-winged schiffornis is "almost certainly sedentary".

=== Feeding ===
The brown-winged schiffornis feeds on fruits and insects, though details are lacking. It usually forages singly and only rarely joins mixed-species feeding flocks. It forages mostly in the forests's understory, often clinging to a low-level vertical stem, and takes food from vegetation with short sallies from a perch.

=== Breeding ===
The brown-winged schiffornis' breeding season has not been defined but includes February in eastern Brazil and April in Colombia and Venezuela. Its one known nest was made from plant fibers and dry leaves in a partially rotted tree stump. It held two eggs that were pale yellowish white with a few blackish markings. The incubation period, time to fledging, and details of parental care are not known.

=== Vocalization ===
The brown-winged schiffornis' song is a variable "sequence of normally 2–4 clear, rich musical whistles, last one sharply upslurred". It has been written as "teeeeu, weee, tu-weeeé", "weeeeee … PREE, a-weET", and "teeuu, yoowée, tu, tu-wee". The species also makes a "short rattling chatter".

== Status ==
The IUCN has assessed the brown-winged schiffornis as being of Least Concern. It has a very large range; its population size and trend are not known. No immediate threats have been identified. It is considered "locally fairly common" in Colombia, uncommon in Peru, fairly common in Venezuela, and "frequent to uncommon" in Brazil. It occurs in many protected areas though few of them are within the southeastern Brazilian range of the nominate subspecies.
