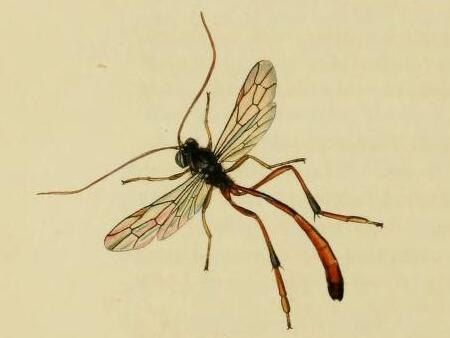
- Heteropelma amictum

Scientific classification
- Domain: Eukaryota
- Kingdom: Animalia
- Phylum: Arthropoda
- Class: Insecta
- Order: Hymenoptera
- Family: Ichneumonidae
- Tribe: Gravenhorstiini
- Genus: Heteropelma; Wesmael, 1849

= Heteropelma =

Genus of wasps

Heteropelma is a genus of parasitoid wasps belonging to the family Ichneumonidae. Species in this genus are around 25 mm in length.

== Reproduction ==
Heteropelma adults lay their eggs inside Lepidopteran larvae (i.e. caterpillars) by piercing them with their ovipositor. Heteropelma eggs consist of an equatorial disc and a caudal stalk, making them look a bit like the cartoon oil lamp from Aladdin. It's thought that the shape is adapted to attach the egg to the inside of the caterpillar's integument. Once the eggs hatch, the larvae consume the caterpillar from the inside. They emerge from the deceased caterpillar as adults.

== Species ==
- Heteropelma amictum
- Heteropelma fulvitarse
- Heteropelma megarthrum
- Heteropelma signatum
- Heteropelma szepligetii
