= List of birds of Peru =

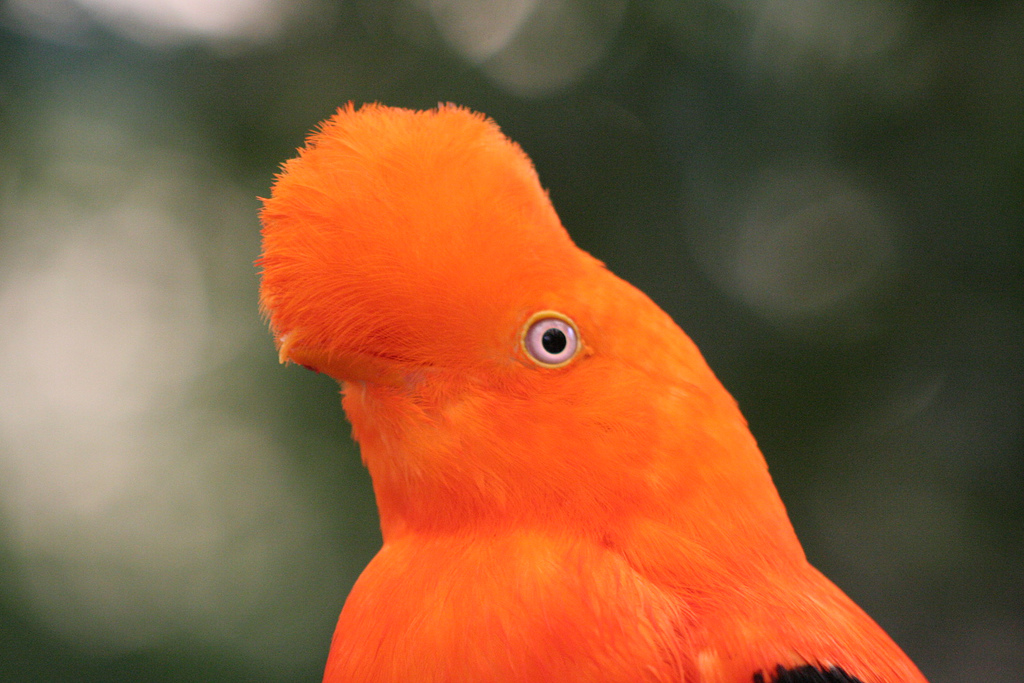
The Andean cock-of-the-rock is the national bird of Peru.

This is a list of the bird species recorded in Peru. The avifauna of Peru has 1897 confirmed species, of which 120 are endemic, three have been introduced by humans, and 86 are rare or vagrants. An additional 23 species are unconfirmed (see below).

Except as an entry is cited otherwise, the list of species is that of the South American Classification Committee (SACC) The list's taxonomic treatment (designation and sequence of orders, families, and species) and nomenclature (common and scientific names) are also those of the SACC unless noted otherwise. Capitalization within English names follows Wikipedia practice, i.e. only the first word of a name is capitalized unless a place name such as São Paulo is used.

The following tags have been used to highlight certain categories of occurrence.

- (V) Vagrant - a species that rarely or accidentally occurs in Peru
- (E) Endemic - a species endemic to Peru
- (I) Introduced - a species introduced to Peru as a consequence, direct or indirect, of human actions
- (U) Unconfirmed - a species recorded but with "no tangible evidence" according to the SACC

== Rheas ==
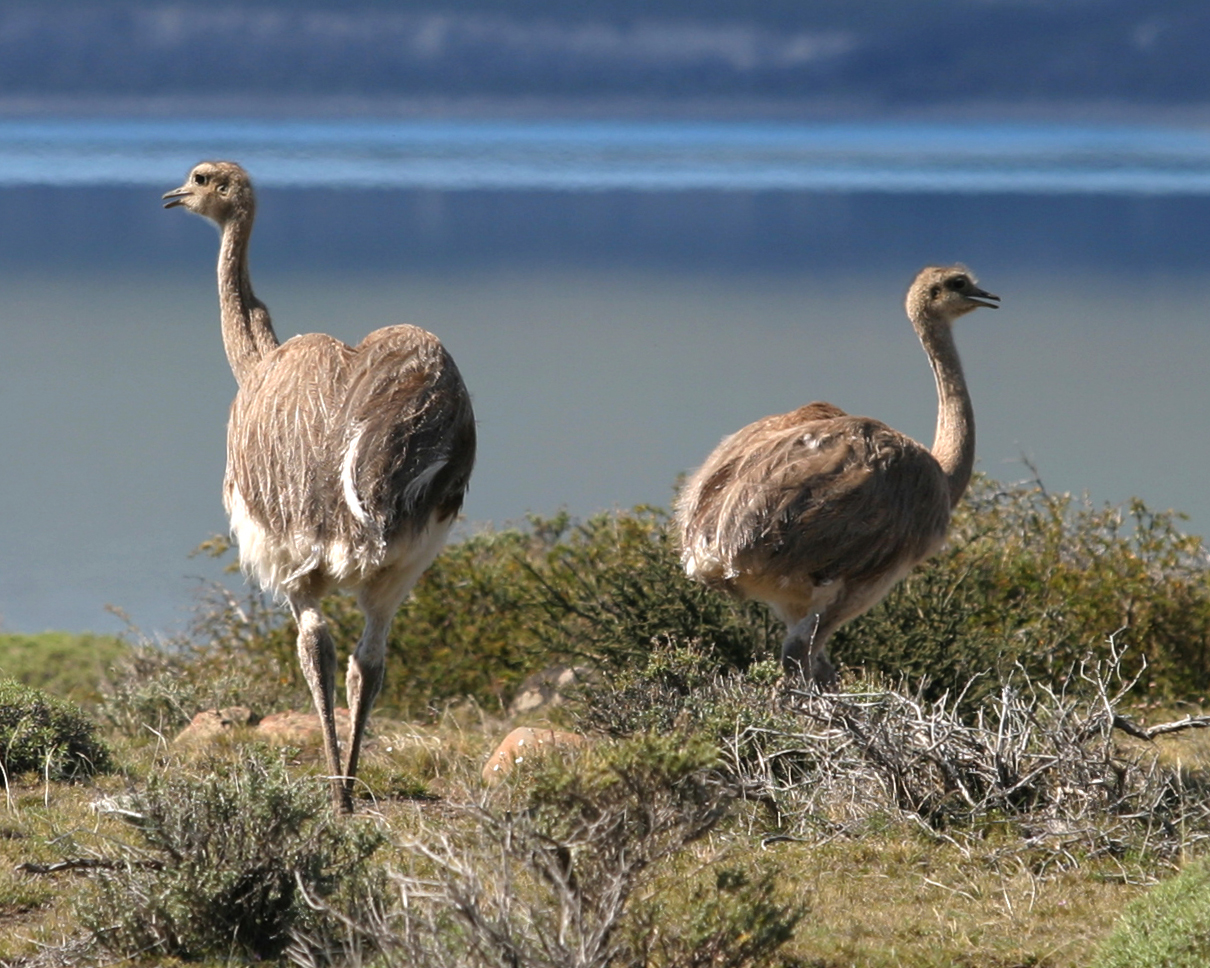
Lesser rhea

Order: Rheiformes Family: Rheidae

The rheas are large flightless birds native to South America. Their feet have three toes rather than four which allows them to run faster. One species has been recorded in Peru.

- Lesser rhea, Pterocnemia pennata

== Tinamous ==
Order: Tinamiformes Family: Tinamidae

The tinamous are one of the most ancient groups of bird. Although they look similar to other ground-dwelling birds like quail and grouse, they have no close relatives and are classified as a single family, Tinamidae, within their own order, the Tinamiformes. Peru contains the largest number of tinamous of any country. Twenty-seven species have been recorded there.

- Tawny-breasted tinamou, Nothocercus julius
- Highland tinamou, Nothocercus bonapartei
- Hooded tinamou, Nothocercus nigrocapillus
- Gray tinamou, Tinamus tao
- Black tinamou, Tinamus osgoodi
- Great tinamou, Tinamus major
- White-throated tinamou, Tinamus guttatus
- Cinereous tinamou, Crypturellus cinereus
- Little tinamou, Crypturellus soui
- Brown tinamou, Crypturellus obsoletus
- Undulated tinamou, Crypturellus undulatus
- Pale-browed tinamou, Crypturellus transfasciatus
- Brazilian tinamou, Crypturellus strigulosus
- Gray-legged tinamou, Crypturellus duidae
- Black-capped tinamou, Crypturellus atrocapillus
- Variegated tinamou, Crypturellus variegatus
- Bartlett's tinamou, Crypturellus bartletti
- Small-billed tinamou, Crypturellus parvirostris
- Barred tinamou, Crypturellus casiquiare
- Tataupa tinamou, Crypturellus tataupa
- Red-winged tinamou, Rhynchotus rufescens
- Taczanowski's tinamou, Nothoprocta taczanowskii
- Ornate tinamou, Nothoprocta ornata
- Andean tinamou, Nothoprocta pentlandii
- Curve-billed tinamou, Nothoprocta curvirostris
- Darwin's nothura, Nothura darwinii
- Puna tinamou, Tinamotis pentlandii
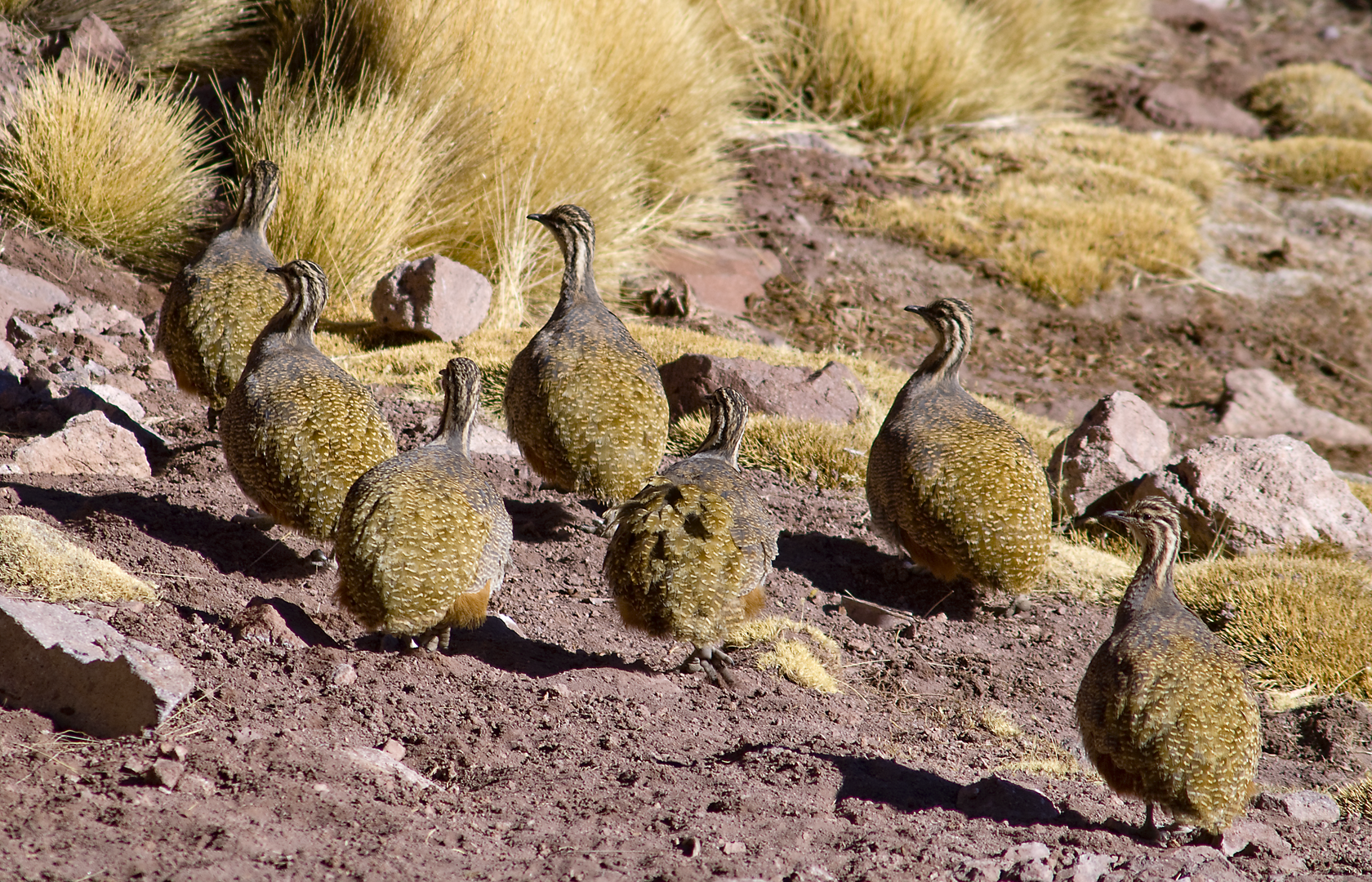
Puna tinamou

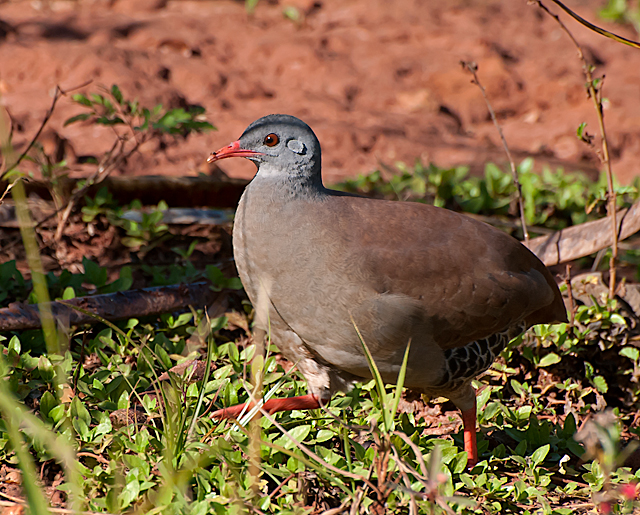
Small-billed tinamou

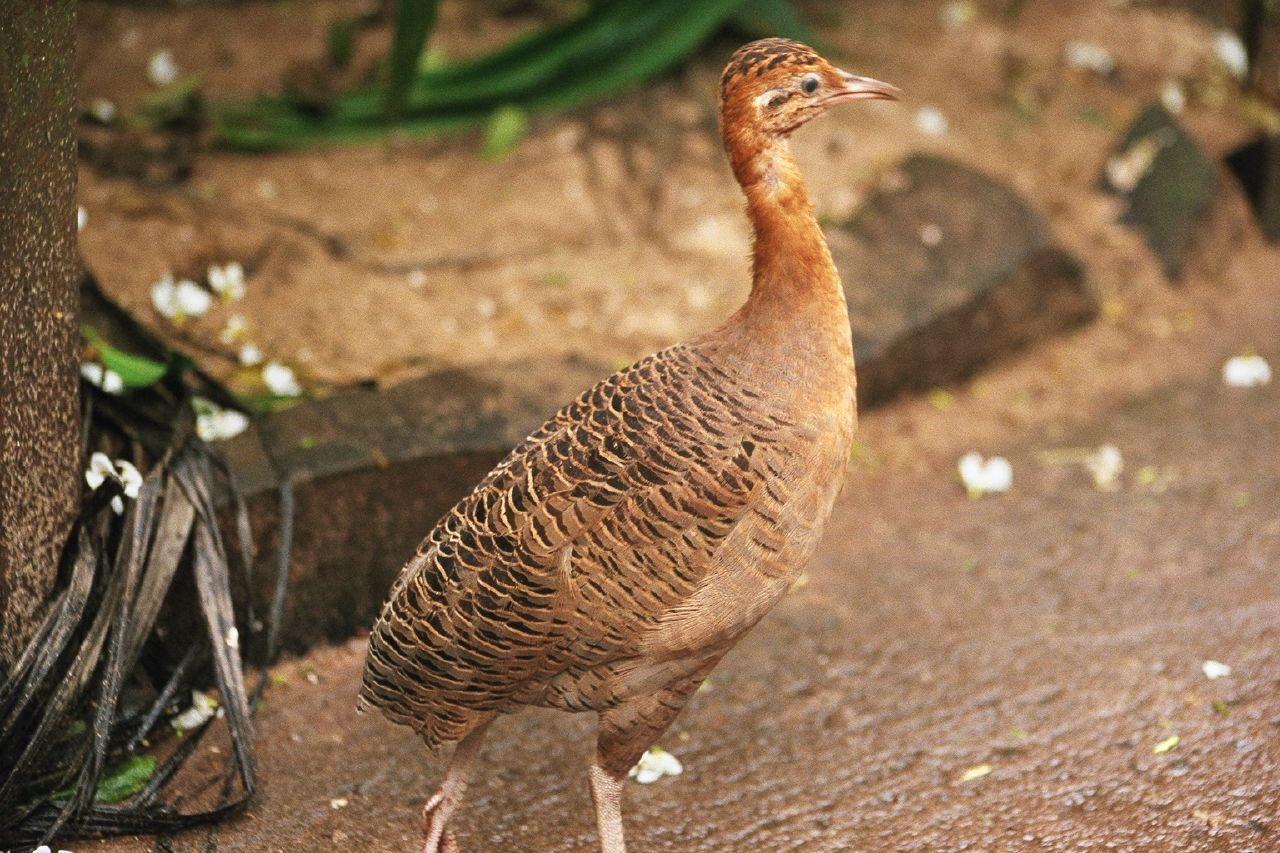
Red-winged tinamou

== Screamers ==
Order: Anseriformes Family: Anhimidae

The screamers are a small family of birds related to the ducks. They are large, bulky birds, with a small downy head, long legs, and large feet which are only partially webbed. They have large spurs on their wings which are used in fights over mates and in territorial disputes. Two species have been recorded in Peru.

- Horned screamer, Anhima cornuta
- Southern screamer, Chauna torquata (V)

== Ducks ==
Order: Anseriformes Family: Anatidae

Anatidae includes the ducks and most duck-like waterfowl, such as geese and swans. These birds are adapted to an aquatic existence with webbed feet, flattened bills, and feathers that are excellent at shedding water due to an oily coating. Twenty-four species have been recorded in Peru.

- Fulvous whistling-duck, Dendrocygna bicolor
- White-faced whistling-duck, Dendrocygna viduata (V)
- Black-bellied whistling-duck, Dendrocygna autumnalis
- Orinoco goose, Oressochen jubatus
- Andean goose, Oressochen melanopterus
- Muscovy duck, Cairina moschata
- Comb duck, Sarkidiornis sylvicola
- Brazilian teal, Amazonetta brasiliensis
- Torrent duck, Merganetta armata
- Crested duck, Lophonetta specularioides
- Puna teal, Spatula puna
- Red shoveler, Spatula platalea
- Northern shoveler, Spatula clypeata (V)
- Blue-winged teal, Spatula discors
- Cinnamon teal, Spatula cyanoptera
- Chiloe wigeon, Mareca sibilatrix
- White-cheeked pintail, Anas bahamensis
- Yellow-billed pintail, Anas georgica
- Andean teal, Anas andium
- Yellow-billed teal, Anas flavirostris
- Southern pochard, Netta erythrophthalma
- Rosy-billed pochard, Netta peposaca (V)
- Masked duck, Nomonyx dominicus
- Ruddy duck, Oxyura jamaicensis
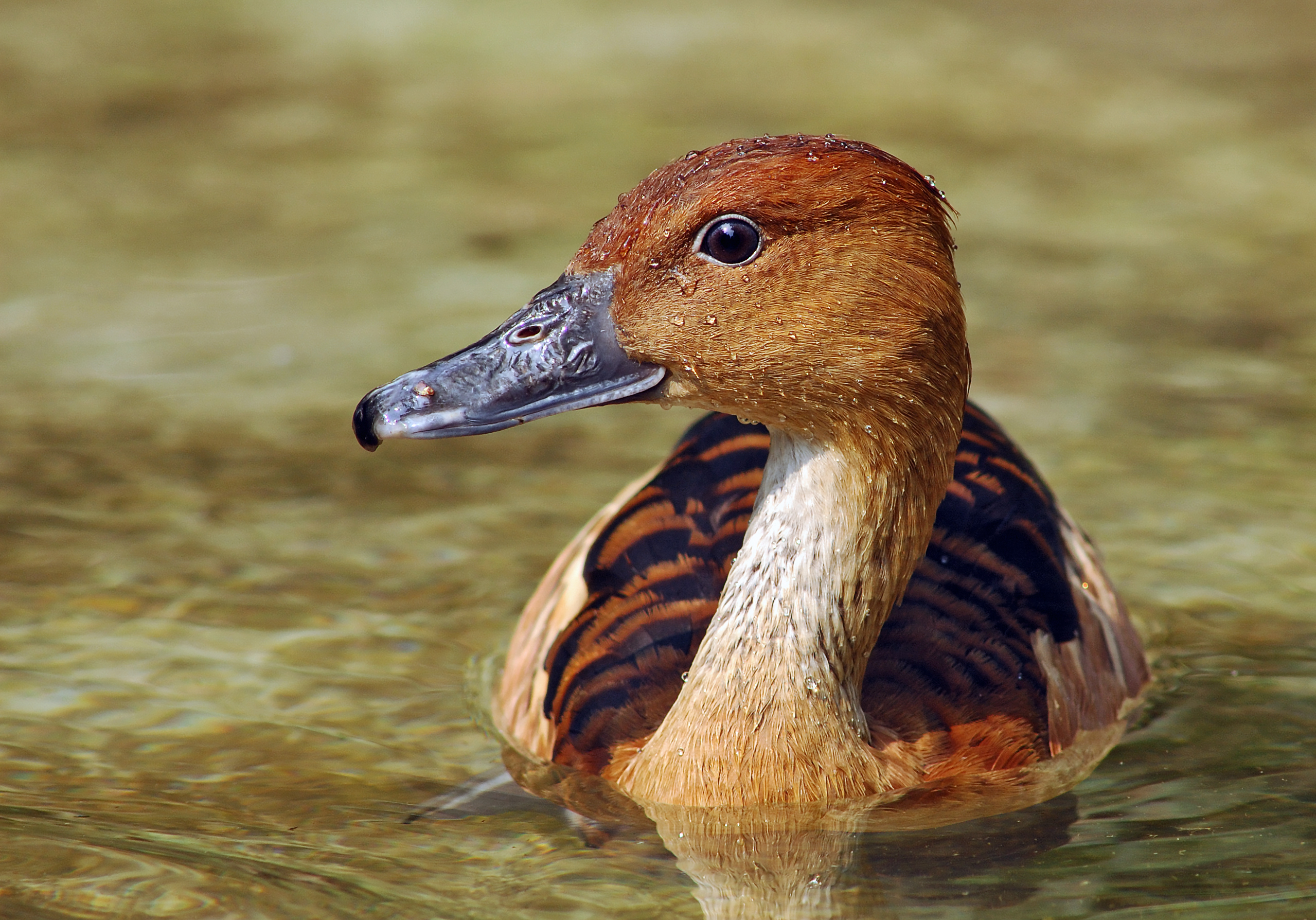
Fulvous whistling-duck

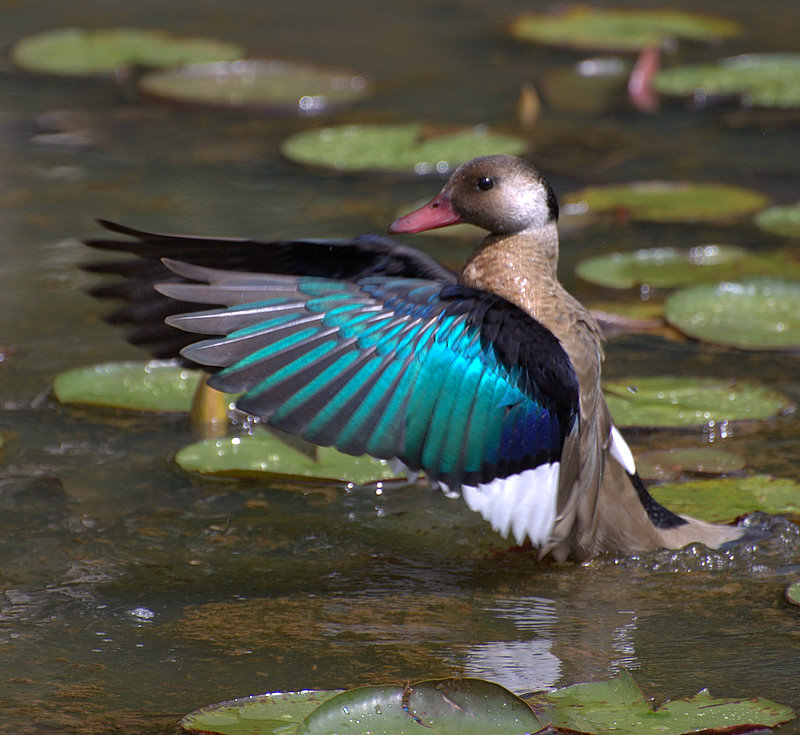
Brazilian teal

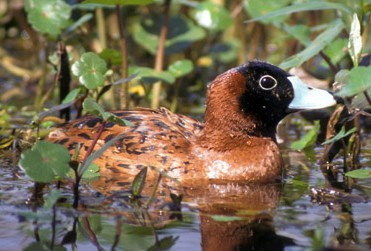
Masked duck

== Guans ==
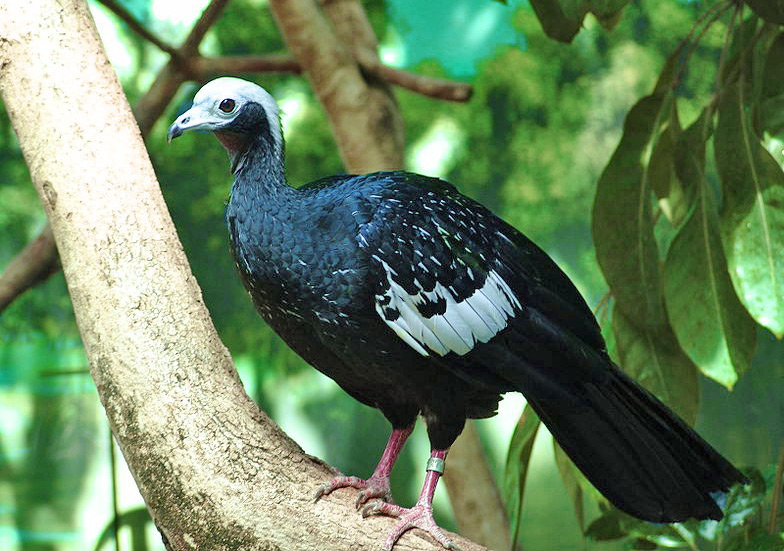
Blue-throated piping-guan

Order: Galliformes Family: Cracidae

The Cracidae are large birds, similar in general appearance to turkeys. The guans and curassows live in trees, but the smaller chachalacas are found in more open scrubby habitats. They are generally dull-plumaged, but the curassows and some guans have colorful facial ornaments. Sixteen species have been recorded in Peru.

- Sickle-winged guan, Chamaepetes goudotii
- Bearded guan, Penelope barbata
- Andean guan, Penelope montagnii
- Spix's guan, Penelope jacquacu
- Crested guan, Penelope purpurascens
- White-winged guan, Penelope albipennis (E)
- Blue-throated piping-guan, Pipile cumanensis
- Wattled guan, Aburria aburri
- Rufous-headed chachalaca, Ortalis erythroptera
- Speckled chachalaca, Ortalis guttata
- Nocturnal curassow, Nothocrax urumutum
- Wattled curassow, Crax globulosa
- Salvin's curassow, Mitu salvini
- Razor-billed curassow, Mitu tuberosum
- Sira curassow, Pauxi koepckeae (E)

== New World quails ==
Order: Galliformes Family: Odontophoridae

The New World quails are small, plump terrestrial birds only distantly related to the quails of the Old World, but named for their similar appearance and habits. Four species have been recorded in Peru.

- Marbled wood-quail, Odontophorus gujanensis
- Rufous-breasted wood-quail, Odontophorus speciosus
- Stripe-faced wood-quail, Odontophorus balliviani
- Starred wood-quail, Odontophorus stellatus

== Flamingos ==
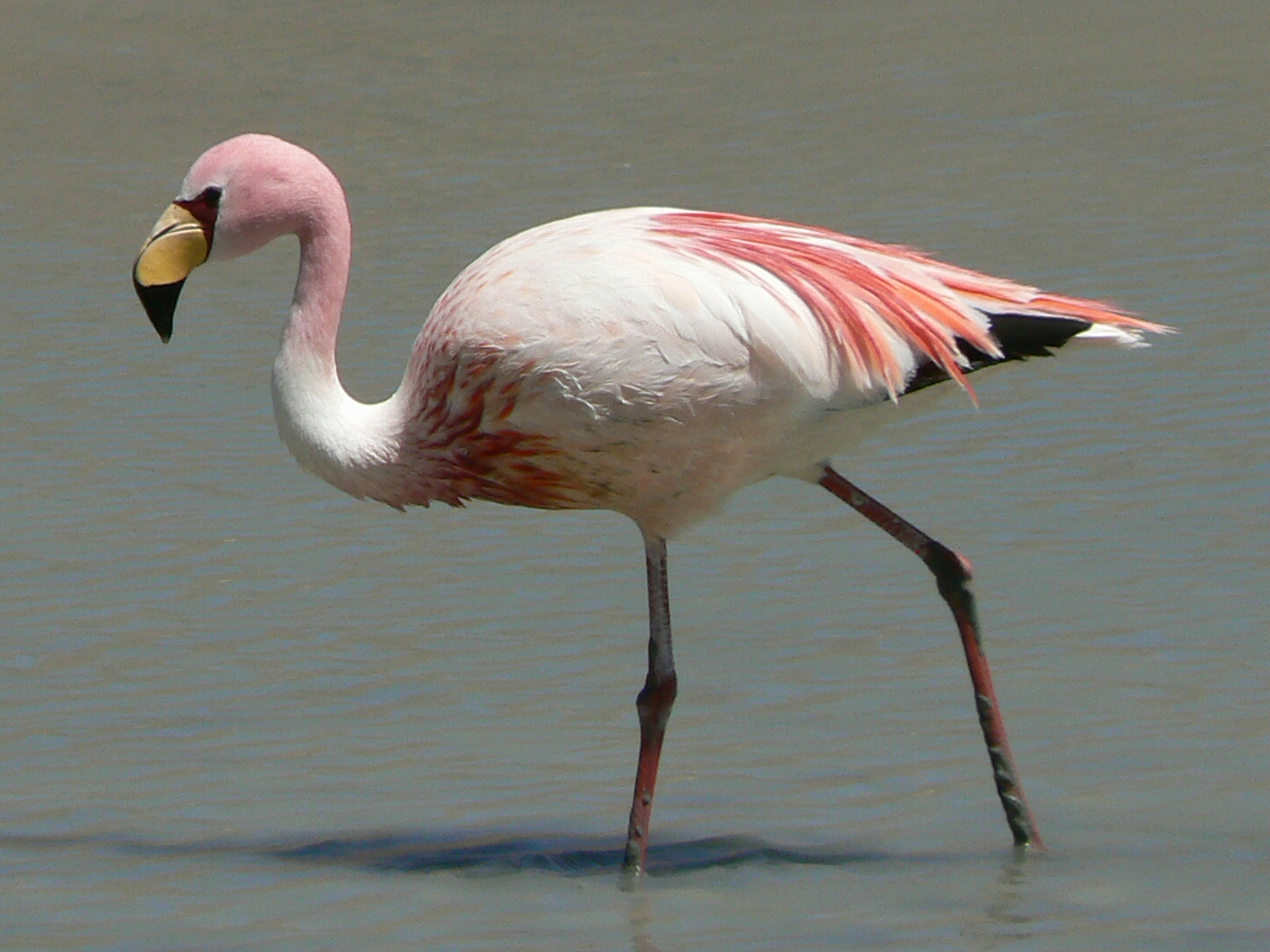
James's flamingo

Order: Phoenicopteriformes Family: Phoenicopteridae

Flamingos are gregarious wading birds, usually 3 to 5 feet (0.9 to 1.5 m) tall, found in both the Western and Eastern Hemispheres. Flamingos filter-feed on shellfish and algae. Their oddly shaped beaks are specially adapted to separate mud and silt from the food they consume and, uniquely, are used upside-down. Three species have been recorded in Peru.

- Chilean flamingo, Phoenicopterus chilensis
- Andean flamingo, Phoenicoparrus andinus
- James's flamingo, Phoenicoparrus jamesi

== Grebes ==
Order: Podicipediformes Family: Podicipedidae

Grebes are small to medium-large freshwater diving birds. They have lobed toes and are excellent swimmers and divers. However, they have their feet placed far back on the body, making them quite ungainly on land. Seven species have been recorded in Peru.

- White-tufted grebe, Rollandia rolland
- Titicaca grebe, Rollandia microptera
- Least grebe, Tachybaptus dominicus
- Pied-billed grebe, Podilymbus podiceps
- Great grebe, Podiceps major
- Silvery grebe, Podiceps occipitalis
- Junin grebe, Podiceps taczanowskii (E)

== Pigeons ==
Order: Columbiformes Family: Columbidae

Pigeons and doves are stout-bodied birds with short necks and short slender bills with a fleshy cere. Thirty species have been recorded in Peru.

- Rock pigeon, Columba livia (I)
- Scaled pigeon, Patagioenas speciosa
- Picazuro pigeon, Patagioenas picazuro (V)
- Spot-winged pigeon, Patagioenas maculosa
- Band-tailed pigeon, Patagioenas fasciata
- Pale-vented pigeon, Patagioenas cayennensis
- Peruvian pigeon, Patagioenas oenops (E)
- Plumbeous pigeon, Patagioenas plumbea
- Ruddy pigeon, Patagioenas subvinacea
- Sapphire quail-dove, Geotrygon saphirina
- Ruddy quail-dove, Geotrygon montana
- Violaceous quail-dove, Geotrygon violacea
- White-tipped dove, Leptotila verreauxi
- Ochre-bellied dove, Leptotila ochraceiventris
- Gray-fronted dove, Leptotila rufaxilla
- Pallid dove, Leptotila pallida
- White-throated quail-dove, Zentrygon frenata
- West Peruvian dove, Zenaida meloda
- Eared dove, Zenaida auriculata
- Blue ground dove, Claravis pretiosa
- Maroon-chested ground dove, Paraclaravis mondetoura
- Bare-faced ground dove, Metriopelia ceciliae
- Black-winged ground dove, Metriopelia melanoptera
- Golden-spotted ground dove, Metriopelia aymara
- Common ground dove, Columbina passerina (V)
- Plain-breasted ground dove, Columbina minuta
- Ruddy ground dove, Columbina talpacoti
- Ecuadorian ground dove, Columbina buckleyi
- Picui ground dove, Columbina picui
- Croaking ground dove, Columbina cruziana

== Cuckoos ==
Order: Cuculiformes Family: Cuculidae

The family Cuculidae includes cuckoos, roadrunners, and anis. These birds are of variable size with slender bodies, long tails and strong legs. Eighteen species have been recorded in Peru.

- Guira cuckoo, Guira guira (V)
- Greater ani, Crotophaga major
- Smooth-billed ani, Crotophaga ani
- Groove-billed ani, Crotophaga sulcirostris
- Striped cuckoo, Tapera naevia
- Pheasant cuckoo, Dromococcyx phasianellus
- Pavonine cuckoo, Dromococcyx pavoninus
- Rufous-vented ground-cuckoo, Neomorphus geoffroyi
- Red-billed ground-cuckoo, Neomorphus pucheranii
- Little cuckoo, Coccycua minuta
- Ash-colored cuckoo, Coccycua cinerea (V)
- Squirrel cuckoo, Piaya cayana
- Black-bellied cuckoo, Piaya melanogaster
- Dark-billed cuckoo, Coccyzus melacoryphus
- Yellow-billed cuckoo, Coccyzus americanus
- Pearly-breasted cuckoo, Coccyzus euleri (V)
- Black-billed cuckoo, Coccyzus erythropthalmus
- Gray-capped cuckoo, Coccyzus lansbergi

== Oilbird ==
Order: Steatornithiformes Family: Steatornithidae

The oilbird is a slim, long-winged bird related to the nightjars. It is nocturnal and a specialist feeder on the fruit of the oil palm.

- Oilbird, Steatornis caripensis

== Potoos ==
Order: Nyctibiiformes Family: Nyctibiidae

The potoos (sometimes called poor-me-ones) are large near passerine birds related to the nightjars and frogmouths. They are nocturnal insectivores which lack the bristles around the mouth found in the true nightjars. Six species have been recorded in Peru.

- Rufous potoo, Phyllaemulor bracteatus
- Great potoo, Nyctibius grandis
- Long-tailed potoo, Nyctibius aethereus
- Common potoo, Nyctibius griseus
- Andean potoo, Nyctibius maculosus
- White-winged potoo, Nyctibius leucopterus

== Nightjars ==
Order: Caprimulgiformes Family: Caprimulgidae

Nightjars are medium-sized nocturnal birds that usually nest on the ground. They have long wings, short legs, and very short bills. Most have small feet, of little use for walking, and long pointed wings. Their soft plumage is camouflaged to resemble bark or leaves. Twenty-one species have been recorded in Peru.

- Nacunda nighthawk, Chordeiles nacunda
- Sand-colored nighthawk, Chordeiles rupestris
- Lesser nighthawk, Chordeiles acutipennis
- Common nighthawk, Chordeiles minor
- Band-tailed nighthawk, Nyctiprogne leucopyga
- Short-tailed nighthawk, Lurocalis semitorquatus
- Rufous-bellied nighthawk, Lurocalis rufiventris
- Blackish nightjar, Nyctipolus nigrescens
- Common pauraque, Nyctidromus albicollis
- Scrub nightjar, Nyctidromus anthonyi
- Swallow-tailed nightjar, Uropsalis segmentata
- Lyre-tailed nightjar, Uropsalis lyra
- Tschudi's nightjar, Quechuavis decussata
- Little nightjar, Setopagis parvula
- Spot-tailed nightjar, Hydropsalis maculicaudus
- Ladder-tailed nightjar, Hydropsalis climacocerca
- Scissor-tailed nightjar, Hydropsalis torquata
- Band-winged nightjar, Systellura longirostris
- Ocellated poorwill, Nyctiphrynus ocellatus
- Silky-tailed nightjar, Antrostomus sericocaudatus
- Rufous nightjar, Antrostomus rufus

== Swifts ==
Order: Apodiformes Family: Apodidae

Swifts are small birds which spend the majority of their lives flying. These birds have very short legs and never settle voluntarily on the ground, perching instead only on vertical surfaces. Many swifts have long swept-back wings which resemble a crescent or boomerang. Fourteen species have been recorded in Peru.

- Spot-fronted swift, Cypseloides cherriei
- White-chinned swift, Cypseloides cryptus
- White-chested swift, Cypseloides lemosi
- Chestnut-collared swift, Streptoprocne rutila
- White-collared swift, Streptoprocne zonaris
- Gray-rumped swift, Chaetura cinereiventris
- Pale-rumped swift, Chaetura egregia
- Chimney swift, Chaetura pelagica
- Chapman's swift, Chaetura chapmani
- Short-tailed swift, Chaetura brachyura
- White-tipped swift, Aeronautes montivagus
- Andean swift, Aeronautes andecolus
- Fork-tailed palm-swift, Tachornis squamata
- Lesser swallow-tailed swift, Panyptila cayennensis

== Hummingbirds ==
Order: Apodiformes Family: Trochilidae

Hummingbirds are small birds capable of hovering in mid-air due to the rapid flapping of their wings. They are the only birds that can fly backwards. One hundred twenty-eight species have been recorded in Peru.

- Fiery topaz, Topaza pyra
- White-necked jacobin, Florisuga mellivora
- White-tipped sicklebill, Eutoxeres aquila
- Buff-tailed sicklebill, Eutoxeres condamini
- Rufous-breasted hermit, Glaucis hirsutus
- Pale-tailed barbthroat, Threnetes leucurus
- Black-throated hermit, Phaethornis atrimentalis
- Gray-chinned hermit, Phaethornis griseogularis
- Reddish hermit, Phaethornis ruber
- White-browed hermit, Phaethornis stuarti
- Planalto hermit, Phaethornis pretrei
- White-bearded hermit, Phaethornis hispidus
- Green hermit, Phaethornis guy
- Tawny-bellied hermit, Phaethornis syrmatophorus
- Koepcke's hermit, Phaethornis koepckeae (E)
- Needle-billed hermit, Phaethornis philippii
- Straight-billed hermit, Phaethornis bourcieri
- Long-billed hermit, Phaethornis longirostris
- Great-billed hermit, Phaethornis malaris
- Green-fronted lancebill, Doryfera ludovicae
- Blue-fronted lancebill, Doryfera johannae
- Geoffroy's daggerbill, Schistes geoffroyi
- Brown violetear, Colibri delphinae
- Lesser violetear, Colibri cyanotus
- Sparkling violetear, Colibri coruscans
- Purple-crowned fairy, Heliothryx barroti
- Black-eared fairy, Heliothryx auritus
- White-tailed goldenthroat, Polytmus guainumbi
- Green-tailed goldenthroat, Polytmus theresiae
- Ruby-topaz hummingbird, Chrysolampis mosquitus
- Black-throated mango, Anthracothorax nigricollis
- Amethyst-throated sunangel, Heliangelus amethysticollis
- Little sunangel, Heliangelus micraster
- Purple-throated sunangel, Heliangelus viola
- Royal sunangel, Heliangelus regalis
- Wire-crested thorntail, Discosura popelairii
- Black-bellied thorntail, Discosura langsdorffi
- Rufous-crested coquette, Lophornis delattrei
- Spangled coquette, Lophornis stictolophus
- Butterfly coquette, Lophornis verreauxii
- Ecuadorian piedtail, Phlogophilus hemileucurus
- Peruvian piedtail, Phlogophilus harterti (E)
- Speckled hummingbird, Adelomyia melanogenys
- Long-tailed sylph, Aglaiocercus kingii
- Bronze-tailed comet, Polyonymus caroli (E)
- Gray-bellied comet, Taphrolesbia griseiventris (E)
- Andean hillstar, Oreotrochilus estella
- Green-headed hillstar, Oreotrochilus stolzmanni
- Black-breasted hillstar, Oreotrochilus melanogaster (E)
- Mountain avocetbill, Opisthoprora euryptera
- Black-tailed trainbearer, Lesbia victoriae
- Green-tailed trainbearer, Lesbia nuna
- Purple-backed thornbill, Ramphomicron microrhynchum
- Bearded mountaineer, Oreonympha nobilis (E)
- Rufous-capped thornbill, Chalcostigma ruficeps
- Olivaceous thornbill, Chalcostigma olivaceum
- Blue-mantled thornbill, Chalcostigma stanleyi
- Rainbow-bearded thornbill, Chalcostigma herrani
- Tyrian metaltail, Metallura tyrianthina
- Neblina metaltail, Metallura odomae
- Coppery metaltail, Metallura theresiae (E)
- Fire-throated metaltail, Metallura eupogon (E)
- Scaled metaltail, Metallura aeneocauda
- Black metaltail, Metallura phoebe (E)
- Greenish puffleg, Haplophaedia aureliae
- Buff-thighed puffleg, Haplophaedia assimilis
- Glowing puffleg, Eriocnemis vestita
- Sapphire-vented puffleg, Eriocnemis luciani
- Emerald-bellied puffleg, Eriocnemis aline
- Marvelous spatuletail, Loddigesia mirabilis (E)
- Shining sunbeam, Aglaeactis cupripennis
- White-tufted sunbeam, Aglaeactis castelnaudii (E)
- Purple-backed sunbeam, Aglaeactis aliciae (E)
- Bronzy Inca, Coeligena coeligena
- Collared Inca, Coeligena torquata
- Violet-throated starfrontlet, Coeligena violifer
- Rainbow starfrontlet, Coeligena iris
- Buff-winged starfrontlet, Coeligena lutetiae
- Mountain velvetbreast, Lafresnaya lafresnayi
- Sword-billed hummingbird, Ensifera ensifera
- Great sapphirewing, Pterophanes cyanopterus
- Chestnut-breasted coronet, Boissonneaua matthewsii
- Booted racket-tail, Ocreatus underwoodii
- Green-backed hillstar, Urochroa leucura
- Rufous-vented whitetip, Urosticte ruficrissa
- Pink-throated brilliant, Heliodoxa gularis
- Rufous-webbed brilliant, Heliodoxa branickii (E)
- Black-throated brilliant, Heliodoxa schreibersii
- Gould's jewelfront, Heliodoxa aurescens
- Fawn-breasted brilliant, Heliodoxa rubinoides
- Violet-fronted brilliant, Heliodoxa leadbeateri
- Northern giant-hummingbird, Patagona peruviana
- Southern giant-hummingbird, Patagona gigas
- Long-billed starthroat, Heliomaster longirostris
- Blue-tufted starthroat, Heliomaster furcifer (V)
- Purple-collared woodstar, Myrtis fanny
- Chilean woodstar, Eulidia yarrellii (U)
- Oasis hummingbird, Rhodopis vesper
- Peruvian sheartail, Thaumastura cora
- White-bellied woodstar, Chaetocercus mulsant
- Little woodstar, Chaetocercus bombus
- Short-tailed woodstar, Myrmia micrura
- Amethyst woodstar, Calliphlox amethystina
- Blue-tailed emerald, Chlorostilbon mellisugus
- Glittering-bellied emerald, Chlorostilbon lucidus (V)
- Blue-chinned sapphire, Chlorestes notata
- Violet-headed hummingbird, Klais guimeti
- Gray-breasted sabrewing, Campylopterus largipennis
- Napo sabrewing, Campylopterus villaviscensio
- Swallow-tailed hummingbird, Eupetomena macroura
- White-vented plumeleteer, Chalybura buffonii
- Crowned woodnymph, Thalurania colombica (U)
- Fork-tailed woodnymph, Thalurania furcata
- Many-spotted hummingbird, Taphrospilus hypostictus
- Tumbes hummingbird, Thaumasius baeri
- Spot-throated hummingbird, Thaumasius taczanowskii (E)
- Olive-spotted hummingbird, Talaphorus chlorocercus
- White-bellied hummingbird, Elliotomyia chionogaster
- Green-and-white hummingbird, Elliotomyia viridicauda (E)
- Rufous-tailed hummingbird, Amazilia tzacatl
- Amazilia hummingbird, Amazilis amazilia
- Andean emerald, Uranomitra franciae
- White-throated hummingbird, Leucochloris albicollis (V)
- Glittering-throated emerald, Chionomesa fimbriata
- Sapphire-spangled emerald, Chionomesa lactea
- Golden-tailed sapphire, Chrysuronia oenone
- Violet-bellied hummingbird, Chlorestes julie
- Rufous-throated sapphire, Hylocharis sapphirina
- White-chinned sapphire, Chlorestes cyanus

== Hoatzin ==
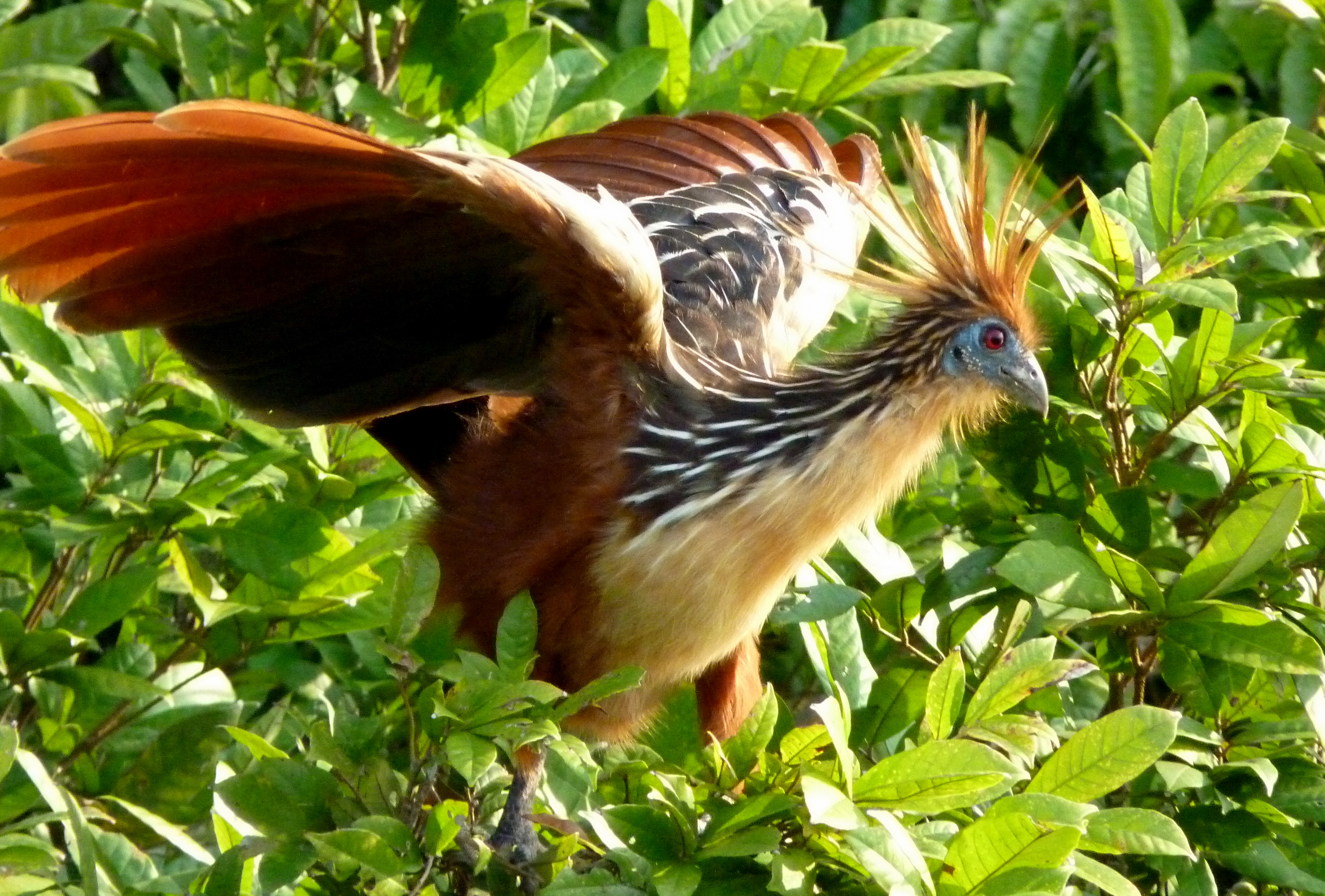
Hoatzin

Order: Opisthocomiformes Family: Opisthocomidae

The hoatzin is pheasant-sized, but much slimmer. It has a long tail and neck, but a small head with an unfeathered blue face and red eyes which are topped by a spiky crest. It is a weak flier which is found in the swamps of the Amazon and Orinoco rivers.

- Hoatzin, Opisthocomus hoazin

== Limpkin ==
Order: Gruiformes Family: Aramidae

The limpkin resembles a large rail. It has drab-brown plumage and a grayer head and neck.

- Limpkin, Aramus guarauna

== Trumpeters ==
Order: Gruiformes Family: Psophiidae

The trumpeters are dumpy birds with long necks and legs and chicken-like bills. They are named for the trumpeting call of the males. Two species have been recorded in Peru.

- Gray-winged trumpeter, Psophia crepitans
- Pale-winged trumpeter, Psophia leucoptera

== Rails ==
Order: Gruiformes Family: Rallidae

Rallidae is a large family of small to medium-sized birds which includes the rails, crakes, coots, and gallinules. Typically they inhabit dense vegetation in damp environments near lakes, swamps, or rivers. In general they are shy and secretive birds, making them difficult to observe. Most species have strong legs and long toes which are well adapted to soft uneven surfaces. They tend to have short, rounded wings and to be weak fliers. Thirty species have been recorded in Peru.

- Mangrove rail, Rallus longirostris
- Virginia rail, Rallus limicola
- Bogota rail, Rallus semiplumbeus
- Purple gallinule, Porphyrio martinica
- Azure gallinule, Porphyrio flavirostris
- Chestnut-headed crake, Anurolimnas castaneiceps
- Russet-crowned crake, Anurolimnas viridis
- Black-banded crake, Anurolimnas fasciatus
- Rufous-sided crake, Laterallus melanophaius
- White-throated crake, Laterallus albigularis (V)
- Gray-breasted crake, Laterallus exilis
- Black rail, Laterallus jamaicensis
- Ocellated crake, Micropygia schomburgkii
- Ash-throated crake, Mustelirallus albicollis
- Paint-billed crake, Mustelirallus erythrops
- Spotted rail, Pardirallus maculatus
- Blackish rail, Pardirallus nigricans
- Plumbeous rail, Pardirallus sanguinolentus
- Uniform crake, Amaurolimnas concolor
- Gray-cowled wood-rail, Aramides cajaneus
- Rufous-necked wood-rail, Aramides axillaris
- Red-winged wood-rail, Aramides calopterus
- Yellow-breasted crake, Porzana flaviventer (V)
- Sora, Porzana carolina
- Common gallinule, Gallinula galeata
- Red-fronted coot, Fulica rufifrons
- Horned coot, Fulica cornuta (V)
- Giant coot, Fulica gigantea
- Slate-colored coot, Fulica ardesiaca
- White-winged coot, Fulica leucoptera

== Finfoots ==
Order: Gruiformes Family: Heliornithidae

Heliornithidae is a small family of tropical birds with webbed lobes on their feet similar to those of grebes and coots. One species has been recorded in Peru.

- Sungrebe, Heliornis fulica

== Plovers ==
Order: Charadriiformes Family: Charadriidae

The family Charadriidae includes the plovers, dotterels, and lapwings. They are small to medium-sized birds with compact bodies, short thick necks, and long, usually pointed, wings. They are found in open country worldwide, mostly in habitats near water. Sixteen species have been recorded in Peru.

- Black-bellied plover, Pluvialis squatarola
- American golden-plover, Pluvialis dominica
- Tawny-throated dotterel, Oreopholus ruficollis
- Pied lapwing, Hoploxypterus cayanus
- Diademed sandpiper-plover, Phegornis mitchellii
- Rufous-chested dotterel, Zonibyx modestus (V)
- Killdeer, Charadrius vociferus
- Semipalmated plover, Charadrius semipalmatus
- Southern lapwing, Vanellus chilensis
- Andean lapwing, Vanellus resplendens
- Lesser sand-plover, Anarynchus mongolus (V)
- Wilson's plover, Anarynchus wilsonia
- Collared plover, Anarynchus collaris
- Puna plover, Anarynchus alticola
- Two-banded plover, Anarynchus falklandicus (V)
- Snowy plover, Anarynchus nivosus

== Oystercatchers ==
Order: Charadriiformes Family: Haematopodidae

The oystercatchers are large and noisy plover-like birds, with strong bills used for smashing or prising open molluscs. Two species have been recorded in Peru.

- American oystercatcher, Haematopus palliatus
- Blackish oystercatcher, Haematopus ater

== Avocets and stilts ==
Order: Charadriiformes Family: Recurvirostridae

Recurvirostridae is a family of large wading birds which includes the avocets and stilts. The avocets have long legs and long up-curved bills. The stilts have extremely long legs and long, thin, straight bills. Two species have been recorded in Peru.

- Black-necked stilt, Himantopus mexicanus
- Andean avocet, Recurvirostra andina

== Thick-knees ==
Order: Charadriiformes Family: Burhinidae

The thick-knees are a group of largely tropical waders in the family Burhinidae. They are found worldwide within the tropical zone, with some species also breeding in temperate Europe and Australia. They are medium to large waders with strong black or yellow-black bills, large yellow eyes, and cryptic plumage. Despite being classed as waders, most species have a preference for arid or semi-arid habitats. One species has been recorded in Peru.

- Peruvian thick-knee, Hesperoburhinus superciliaris

== Sandpipers ==
Order: Charadriiformes Family: Scolopacidae

Scolopacidae is a large diverse family of small to medium-sized shorebirds including the sandpipers, curlews, godwits, shanks, tattlers, woodcocks, snipes, dowitchers, and phalaropes. The majority of these species eat small invertebrates picked out of the mud or soil. Variation in length of legs and bills enables multiple species to feed in the same habitat, particularly on the coast, without direct competition for food. Thirty-eight species have been recorded in Peru.

- Upland sandpiper, Bartramia longicauda
- Whimbrel, Numenius phaeopus
- Long-billed curlew, Numenius americanus (V)
- Bar-tailed godwit, Limosa lapponica (V)
- Hudsonian godwit, Limosa haemastica
- Marbled godwit, Limosa fedoa
- Ruddy turnstone, Arenaria interpres
- Red knot, Calidris canutus
- Surfbird, Calidris virgata
- Ruff, Calidris pugnax (U)
- Stilt sandpiper, Calidris himantopus
- Curlew sandpiper, Calidris ferruginea (V)
- Sanderling, Calidris alba
- Dunlin, Calidris alpina (U)
- Baird's sandpiper, Calidris bairdii
- Least sandpiper, Calidris minutilla
- White-rumped sandpiper, Calidris fuscicollis
- Buff-breasted sandpiper, Calidris subruficollis
- Pectoral sandpiper, Calidris melanotos
- Semipalmated sandpiper, Calidris pusilla
- Western sandpiper, Calidris mauri
- Short-billed dowitcher, Limnodromus griseus
- Long-billed dowitcher, Limnodromus scolopaceus (V)
- Imperial snipe, Gallinago imperialis
- Jameson's snipe, Gallinago jamesoni
- Noble snipe, Gallinago nobilis (U)
- Giant snipe, Gallinago undulata
- Pantanal snipe, Gallinago paraguaiae
- Puna snipe, Gallinago andina
- Wilson's phalarope, Phalaropus tricolor
- Red-necked phalarope, Phalaropus lobatus
- Red phalarope, Phalaropus fulicarius
- Spotted sandpiper, Actitis macularius
- Solitary sandpiper, Tringa solitaria
- Wandering tattler, Tringa incana
- Greater yellowlegs, Tringa melanoleuca
- Willet, Triga semipalmata
- Lesser yellowlegs, Tringa flavipes

== Seedsnipes ==
Order: Charadriiformes Family: Thinocoridae

The seedsnipes are a small family of birds that superficially resemble sparrows. They have short legs and long wings and are herbivorous waders. Three species have been recorded in Peru.

- Rufous-bellied seedsnipe, Attagis gayi
- Gray-breasted seedsnipe, Thinocorus orbignyianus
- Least seedsnipe, Thinocorus rumicivorus

== Jacanas ==
Order: Charadriiformes Family: Jacanidae

The jacanas are a family of waders found throughout the tropics. They are identifiable by their huge feet and claws which enable them to walk on floating vegetation in the shallow lakes that are their preferred habitat. One species has been recorded in Peru.

- Wattled jacana, Jacana jacana

== Skuas ==
Order: Charadriiformes Family: Stercorariidae

The family Stercorariidae are, in general, medium to large birds, typically with gray or brown plumage, often with white markings on the wings. They nest on the ground in temperate and arctic regions and are long-distance migrants. Five species have been recorded in Peru.

- Chilean skua, Stercorarius chilensis
- South polar skua, Stercorarius maccormicki
- Pomarine jaeger, Stercorarius pomarinus
- Parasitic jaeger, Stercorarius parasiticus
- Long-tailed jaeger, Stercorarius longicaudus

== Gulls ==
Order: Charadriiformes Family: Laridae

Laridae is a family of medium to large seabirds and includes gulls, kittiwakes, and terns. Gulls are typically gray or white, often with black markings on the head or wings. They have longish bills and webbed feet. Terns are a group of generally medium to large seabirds typically with gray or white plumage, often with black markings on the head. Most terns hunt fish by diving but some pick insects off the surface of fresh water. Terns are generally long-lived birds, with several species known to live in excess of 30 years. Thirty species of Laridae have been recorded in Peru.

- Black noddy, Anous minutus (V)
- Black skimmer, Rynchops niger
- Swallow-tailed gull, Creagrus furcatus
- Black-legged kittiwake, Rissa tridactyla (V)
- Sabine's gull, Xema sabini
- Andean gull, Chroicocephalus serranus
- Brown-hooded gull, Chroicocephalus maculipennis (V)
- Gray-hooded gull, Chroicocephalus cirrocephalus
- Gray gull, Leucophaeus modestus
- Laughing gull, Leucophaeus atricilla
- Franklin's gull, Leucophaeus pipixcan
- Belcher's gull, Larus belcheri
- Kelp gull, Larus dominicanus
- Herring gull, Larus argentatus (V)
- Sooty tern, Onychoprion fuscatus (V)
- Least tern, Sternula antillarum (V)
- Yellow-billed tern, Sternula superciliaris
- Peruvian tern, Sternula lorata
- Large-billed tern, Phaetusa simplex
- Gull-billed tern, Gelochelidon nilotica
- Caspian tern, Hydroprogne caspia (V)
- Inca tern, Larosterna inca
- Black tern, Chlidonias niger
- Common tern, Sterna hirundo
- Arctic tern, Sterna paradisaea
- South American tern, Sterna hirundinacea
- Snowy-crowned tern, Sterna trudeaui (V)
- Elegant tern, Thalasseus elegans
- Sandwich tern, Thalasseus sandvicensis
- Royal tern, Thalasseus maximus

== Sunbittern ==
Order: Eurypygiformes Family: Eurypygidae

The sunbittern is a bittern-like bird of tropical regions of the Americas and the sole member of the family Eurypygidae (sometimes spelled Eurypigidae) and genus Eurypyga.

- Sunbittern, Eurypyga helias

== Tropicbirds ==
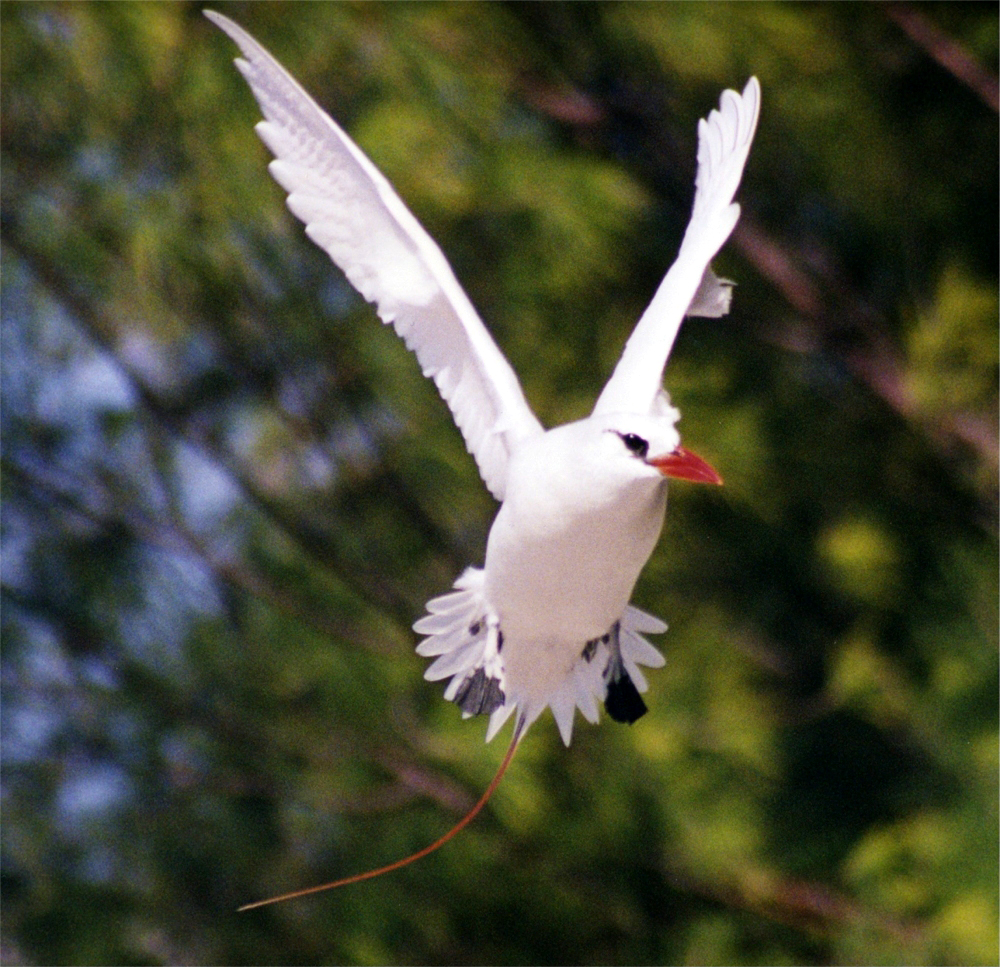
Red-tailed tropicbird

Order: Phaethontiformes Family: Phaethontidae

Tropicbirds are slender white birds of tropical oceans, with exceptionally long central tail feathers. Their heads and long wings have black markings. Two species have been recorded in Peru.

- Red-billed tropicbird, Phaethon aethereus (V)
- Red-tailed tropicbird, Phaethon rubricauda (U)

== Penguins ==
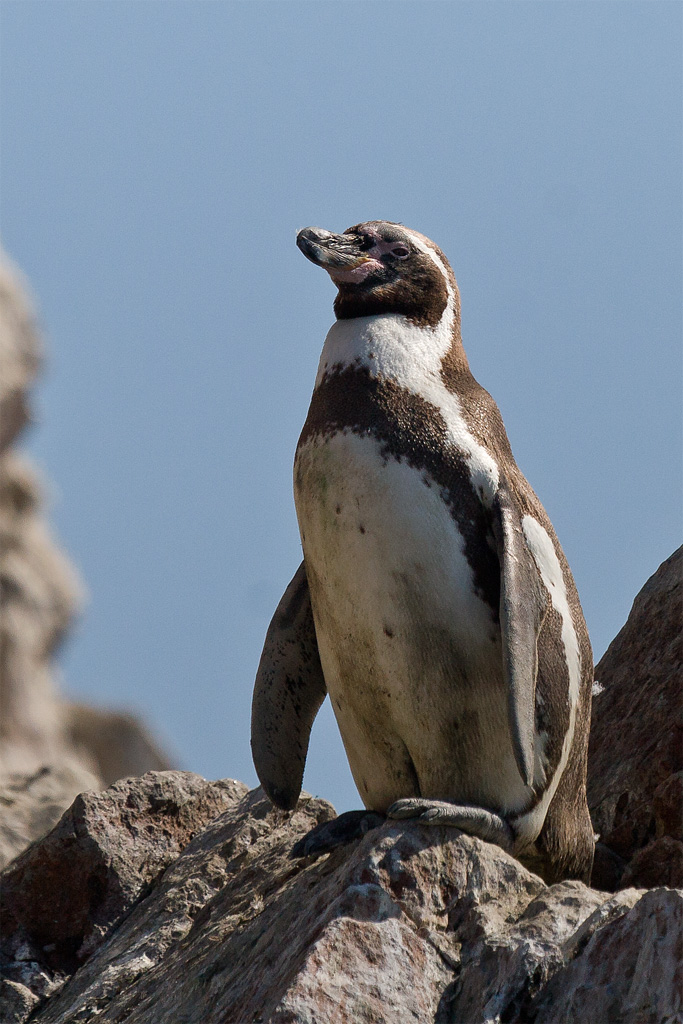
Humboldt penguin

Order: Sphenisciformes Family: Spheniscidae

The penguins are a group of aquatic, flightless birds living almost exclusively in the Southern Hemisphere. Most penguins feed on krill, fish, squid, and other forms of sealife caught while swimming underwater. Three species have been recorded in Peru.

- King penguin, Aptenodytes patagonicus (V)
- Humboldt penguin, Spheniscus humboldti
- Magellanic penguin, Spheniscus magellanicus (V)

== Albatrosses ==
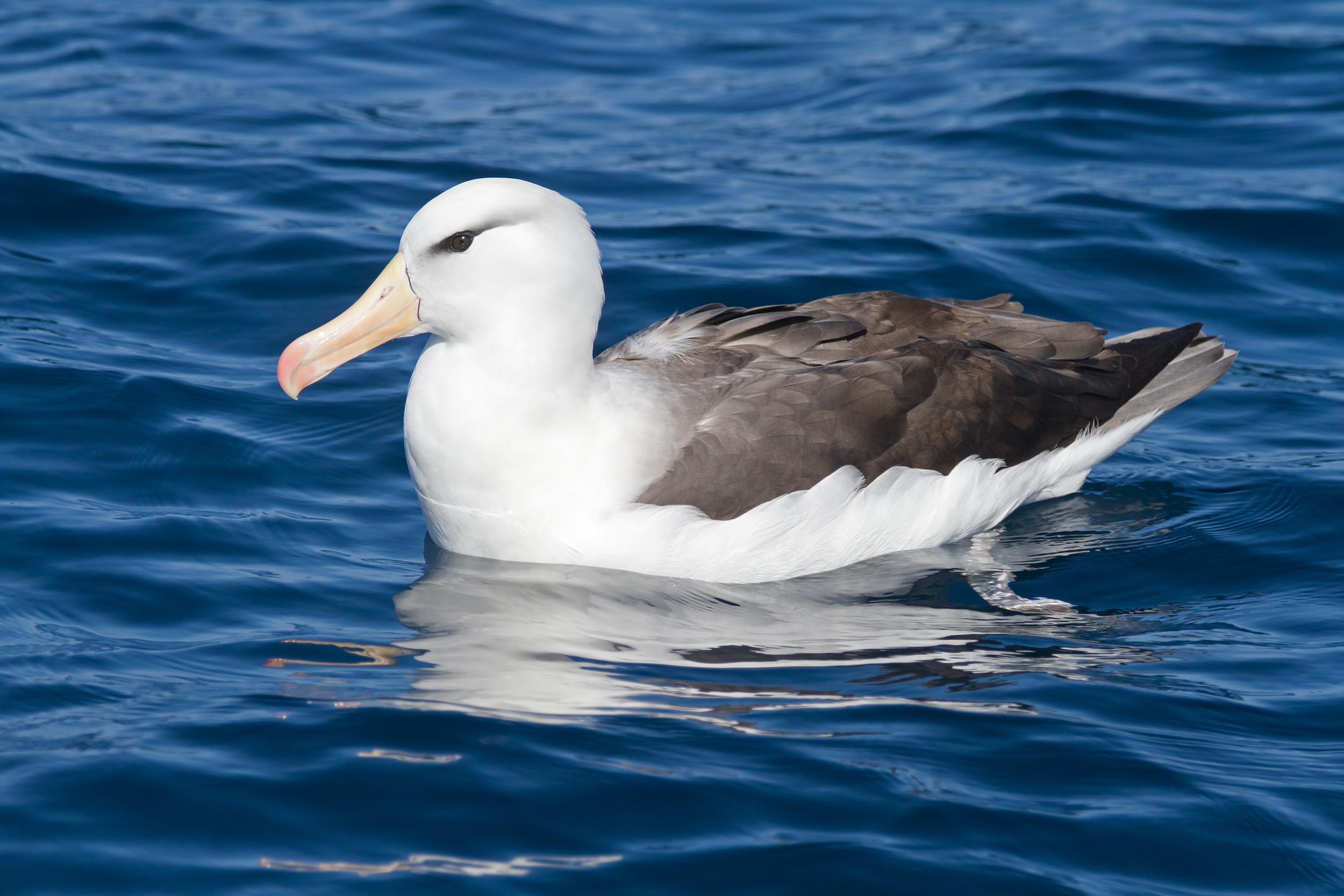
Black-browed albatross

Order: Procellariiformes Family: Diomedeidae

The albatrosses are among the largest of flying birds, and the great albatrosses from the genus Diomedea have the largest wingspans of any extant birds. Six species have been recorded in Peru.

- Waved albatross, Phoebastria irrorata
- Black-browed albatross, Thalassarche melanophris
- Gray-headed albatross, Thalassarche chrysostoma (U)
- Buller's albatross, Thalassarche bulleri
- Salvin's albatross, Thalassarche salvini
- Chatham albatross, Thalassarche eremita

== Southern storm-petrels ==
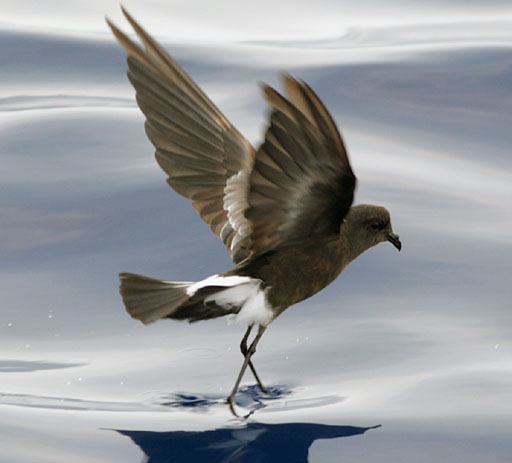
Wilson's storm-petrel

Order: Procellariiformes Family: Oceanitidae

The storm-petrels are the smallest seabirds, relatives of the petrels, feeding on planktonic crustaceans and small fish picked from the surface, typically while hovering. The flight is fluttering and sometimes bat-like. Until 2018, this family's species were included with the other storm-petrels in family Hydrobatidae. Six species have been recorded in Peru.

- White-bellied storm-petrel, Fregetta grallaria (U)
- Black-bellied storm-petrel, Fregetta tropica (V)
- Wilson's storm-petrel, Oceanites oceanicus
- Elliot's storm-petrel, Oceanites gracilis
- Gray-backed storm-petrel, Garrodia nereis (V)
- White-faced storm-petrel, Pelagodroma marina (V)

== Northern storm-petrels ==
Order: Procellariiformes Family: Hydrobatidae

Though the members of this family are similar in many respects to the southern storm-petrels, including their general appearance and habits, there are enough genetic differences to warrant their placement in a separate family. Seven species have been recorded in Peru.

- Least storm-petrel, Hydrobates microsoma (U)
- Wedge-rumped storm-petrel, Hydrobates tethys
- Band-rumped storm-petrel, Hydrobates castro (U)
- Leach's storm-petrel, Hydrobates leucorhous (V)
- Markham's storm-petrel, Hydrobates markhami
- Hornby's storm-petrel, Hydrobates hornbyi
- Black storm-petrel, Hydrobates melania

== Shearwaters ==
Order: Procellariiformes Family: Procellariidae

The procellariids are the main group of medium-sized "true petrels", characterized by united nostrils with medium septum and a long outer functional primary. Twenty-six species have been recorded in Peru.

- Southern giant-petrel, Macronectes giganteus
- Northern giant-petrel, Macronectes halli
- Southern fulmar, Fulmarus glacialoides
- Pintado petrel, Daption capense
- Cook's petrel, Pterodroma cookii
- Chatham petrel, Pterodroma axillaris (V)
- Masatierra petrel, Pterodroma defilippiana
- Kermadec petrel, Pterodroma neglecta
- Galapagos petrel, Pterodroma phaeopygia
- Juan Fernandez petrel, Pterodroma externa
- Broad-billed prion, Pachyptila vittata (V)
- Antarctic prion, Pachyptila desolata
- Slender-billed prion, Pachyptila belcheri
- Gray petrel, Procellaria cinerea (V)
- White-chinned petrel, Procellaria aequinoctialis
- Parkinson's petrel, Procellaria parkinsoni
- Westland petrel, Procellaria westlandica (V)
- Wedge-tailed shearwater, Ardenna pacifica (U)
- Buller's shearwater, Ardenna bulleri
- Sooty shearwater, Ardenna grisea
- Pink-footed shearwater, Ardenna creatopus
- Flesh-footed shearwater, Ardenna carneipes (U)
- Manx shearwater, Puffinus puffinus (V)
- Galapagos shearwater, Puffinus subalaris (U)
- Little shearwater, Puffinus assimilis (U)
- Peruvian diving-petrel, Pelecanoides garnotii
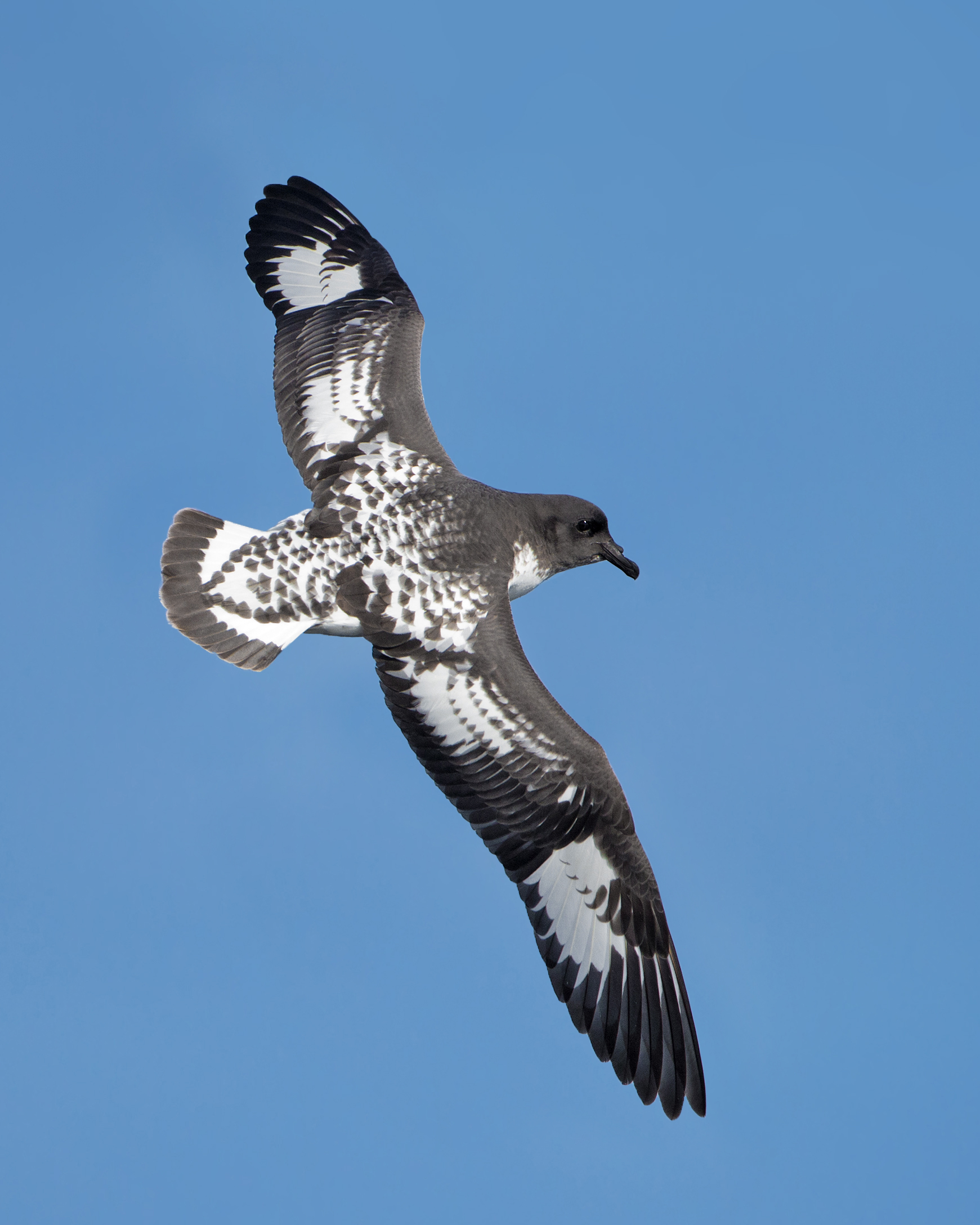
Cape petrel

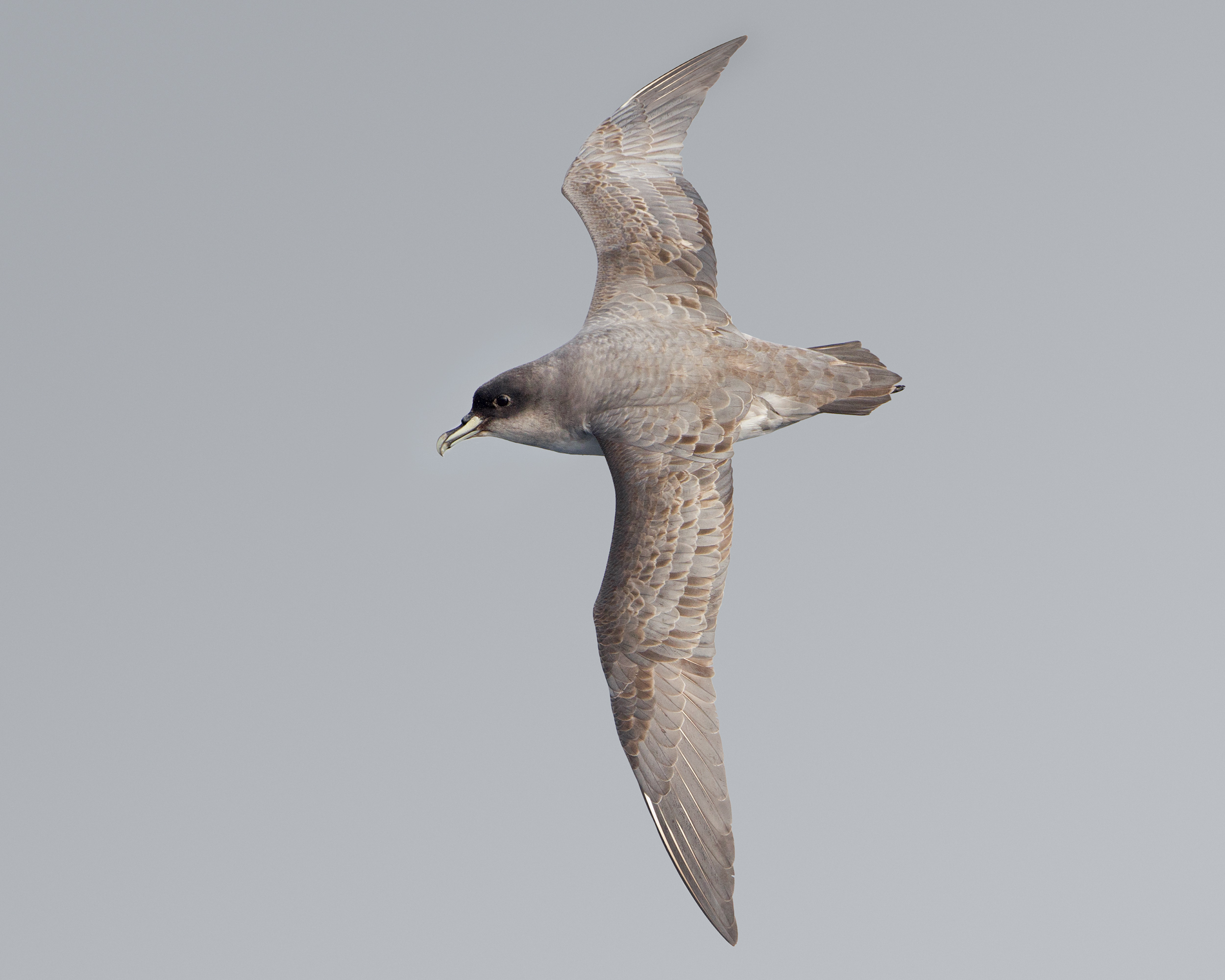
Gray petrel

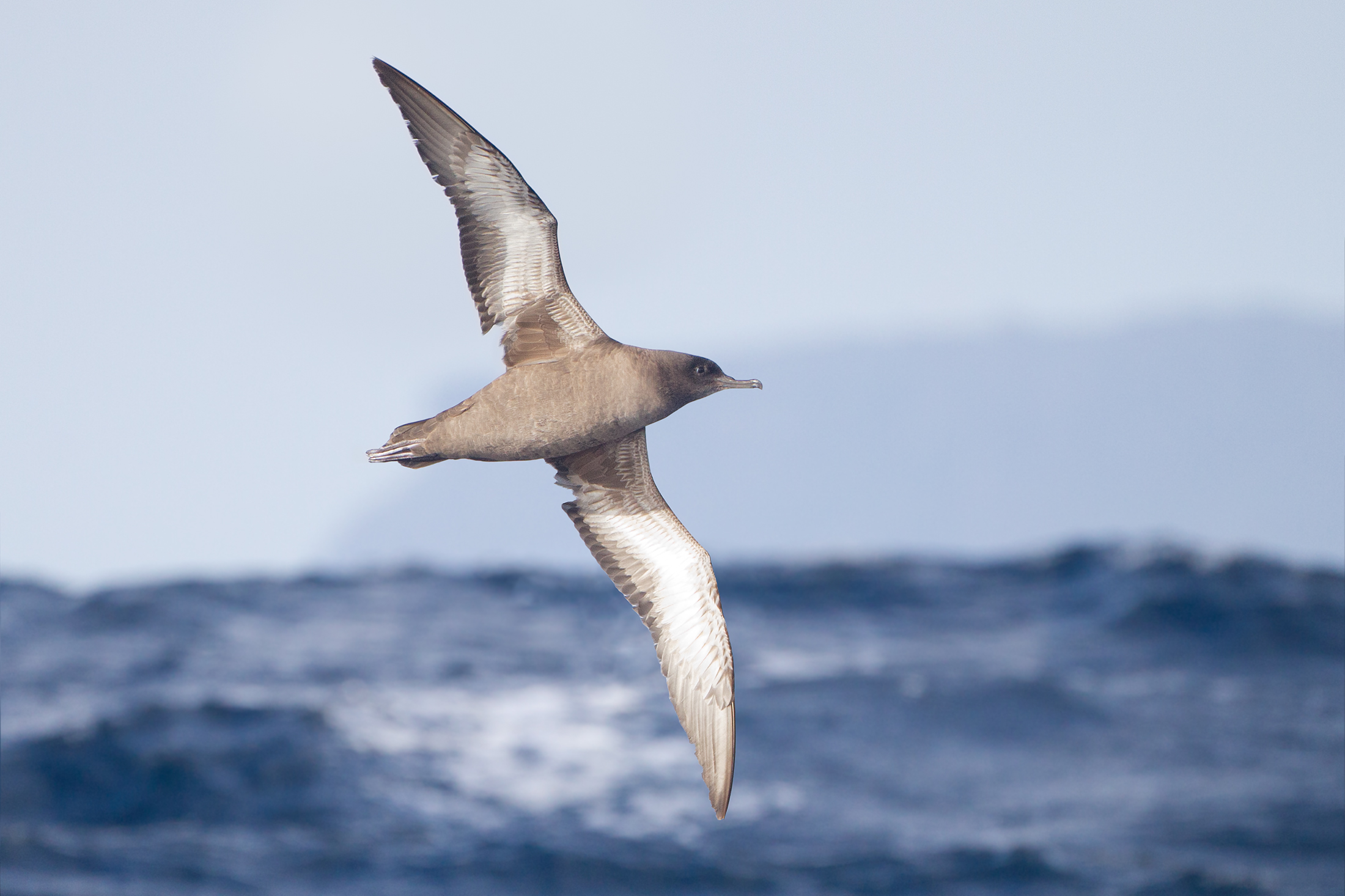
Sooty shearwater

== Storks ==
Order: Ciconiiformes Family: Ciconiidae

Storks are large, long-legged, long-necked wading birds with long, stout bills. Storks are mute, but bill-clattering is an important mode of communication at the nest. Their nests can be large and may be reused for many years. Many species are migratory. Three species have been recorded in Peru.

- Maguari stork, Ciconia maguari (V)
- Jabiru, Jabiru mycteria
- Wood stork, Mycteria americana

== Frigatebirds ==
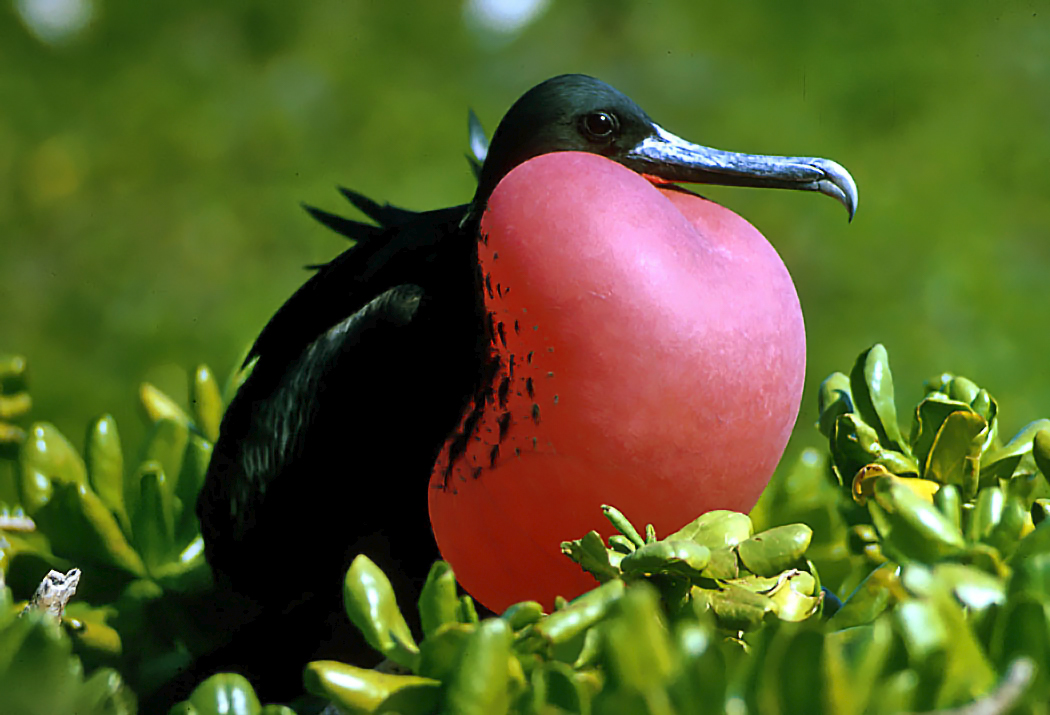
Magnificent frigatebird

Order: Suliformes Family: Fregatidae

Frigatebirds are large seabirds usually found over tropical oceans. They are large, black-and-white or completely black, with long wings and deeply forked tails. The males have colored inflatable throat pouches. They do not swim or walk and cannot take off from a flat surface. Having the largest wingspan-to-body-weight ratio of any bird, they are essentially aerial, able to stay aloft for more than a week. Two species have been recorded in Peru.

- Magnificent frigatebird, Fregata magnificens
- Great frigatebird, Fregata minor (V)

== Boobies ==
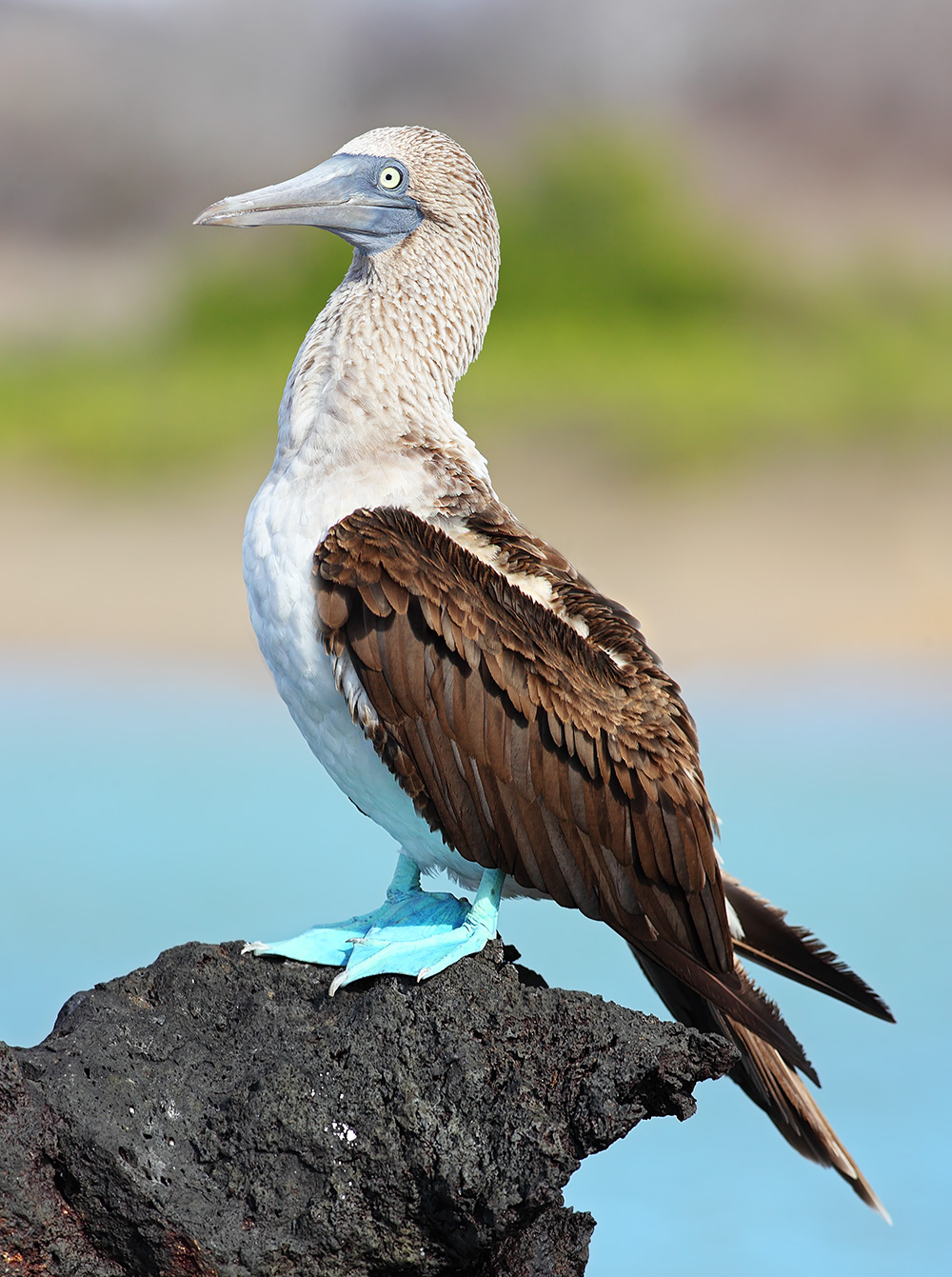
Blue-footed booby

Order: Suliformes Family: Sulidae

The sulids comprise the gannets and boobies. Both groups are medium to large coastal seabirds that plunge-dive for fish. Seven species have been recorded in Peru.

- Cape gannet, Morus capensis (V)
- Blue-footed booby, Sula nebouxii
- Peruvian booby, Sula variegata
- Masked booby, Sula dactylatra
- Nazca booby, Sula granti
- Red-footed booby, Sula sula (V)
- Brewster's booby, Sula brewsteri (V)

== Anhingas ==
Order: Suliformes Family: Anhingidae

Anhingas are often called "snake-birds" because of their long thin neck, which gives a snake-like appearance when they swim with their bodies submerged. The males have black and dark-brown plumage, an erectile crest on the nape, and a larger bill than the female. The females have much paler plumage especially on the neck and underparts. The darters have completely webbed feet and their legs are short and set far back on the body. Their plumage is somewhat permeable, like that of cormorants, and they spread their wings to dry after diving. One species has been recorded in Peru.

- Anhinga, Anhinga anhinga

== Cormorants ==
Order: Suliformes Family: Phalacrocoracidae

Phalacrocoracidae is a family of medium to large coastal, fish-eating seabirds that includes cormorants and shags. Plumage coloration varies, with the majority having mainly dark plumage, some species being black-and-white, and a few being colorful. Three species have been recorded in Peru.

- Red-legged cormorant, Phalacrocorax gaimardi
- Neotropic cormorant, Phalacrocorax brasilianus
- Guanay cormorant, Phalacrocorax bougainvillii

== Pelicans ==
Order: Pelecaniformes Family: Pelecanidae

Pelicans are large water birds with a distinctive pouch under their beak. As with other members of the order Pelecaniformes, they have webbed feet with four toes. Two species have been recorded in Peru.

- Brown pelican, Pelecanus occidentalis
- Peruvian pelican, Pelecanus thagus

== Herons ==
Order: Pelecaniformes Family: Ardeidae

The family Ardeidae contains the bitterns, herons, and egrets. Herons and egrets are medium to large wading birds with long necks and legs. Bitterns tend to be shorter necked and more wary. Members of Ardeidae fly with their necks retracted, unlike other long-necked birds such as storks, ibises, and spoonbills. Twenty-one species have been recorded in Peru.

- Rufescent tiger-heron, Tigrisoma lineatum
- Bare-throated tiger-heron, Tigrisoma mexicanum
- Fasciated tiger-heron, Tigrisoma fasciatum
- Boat-billed heron, Cochlearius cochlearius
- Agami heron, Agamia agami
- Zigzag heron, Zebrilus undulatus
- Stripe-backed bittern, Ixobrychus involucris (V)
- Least bittern, Ixobrychus exilis
- Pinnated bittern, Botaurus pinnatus (U)
- Capped heron, Pilherodius pileatus
- Whistling heron, Syrigma sibilatrix (V)
- Little blue heron, Egretta caerulea
- Tricolored heron, Egretta tricolor
- Reddish egret, Egretta rufescens (V)
- Snowy egret, Egretta thula
- Yellow-crowned night-heron, Nyctanassa violacea
- Black-crowned night-heron, Nycticorax nycticorax
- Striated heron, Butorides striata
- Cattle egret, Ardea ibis
- Great egret, Ardea alba
- Cocoi heron, Ardea cocoi
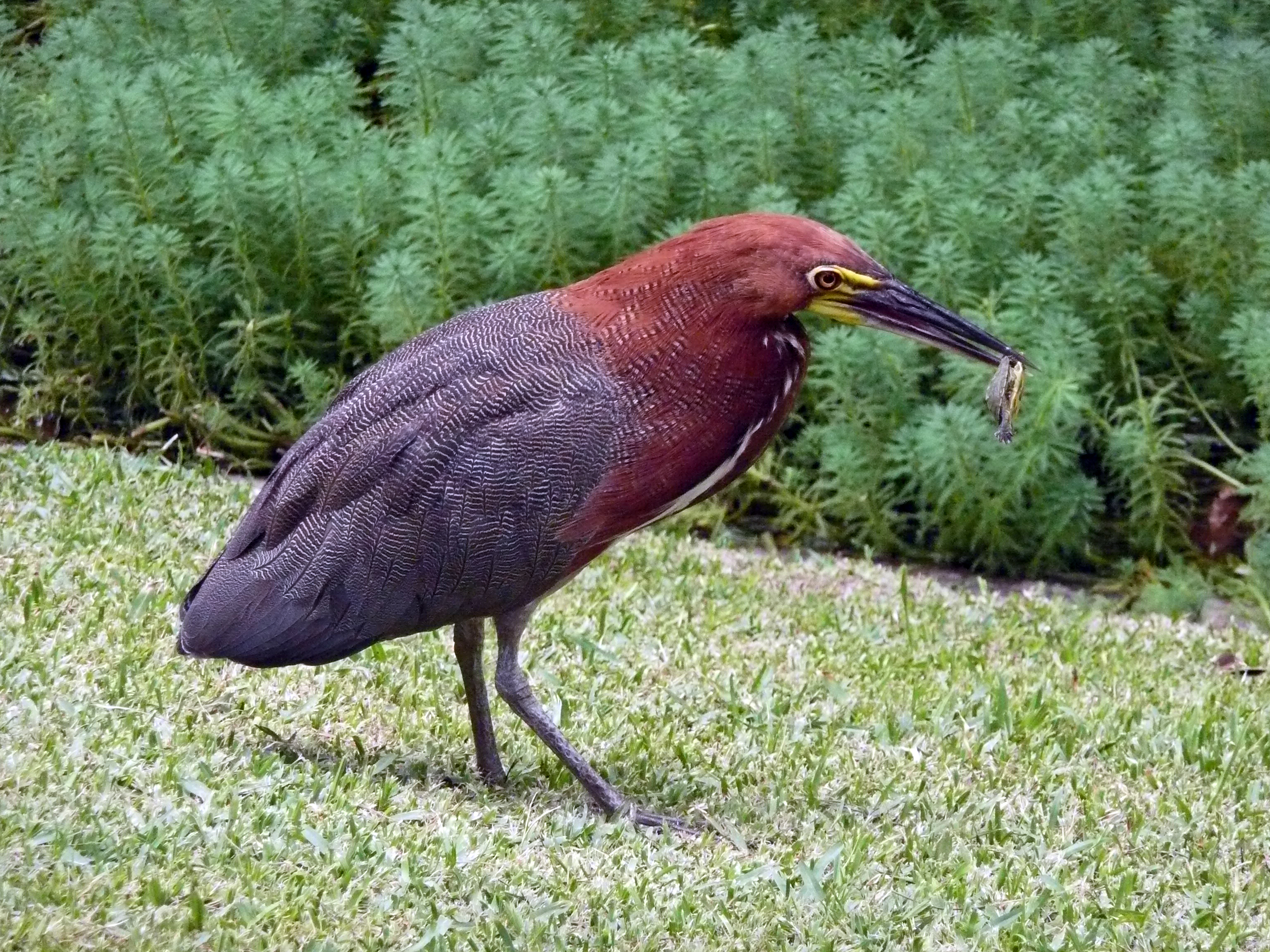
Rufescent tiger-heron

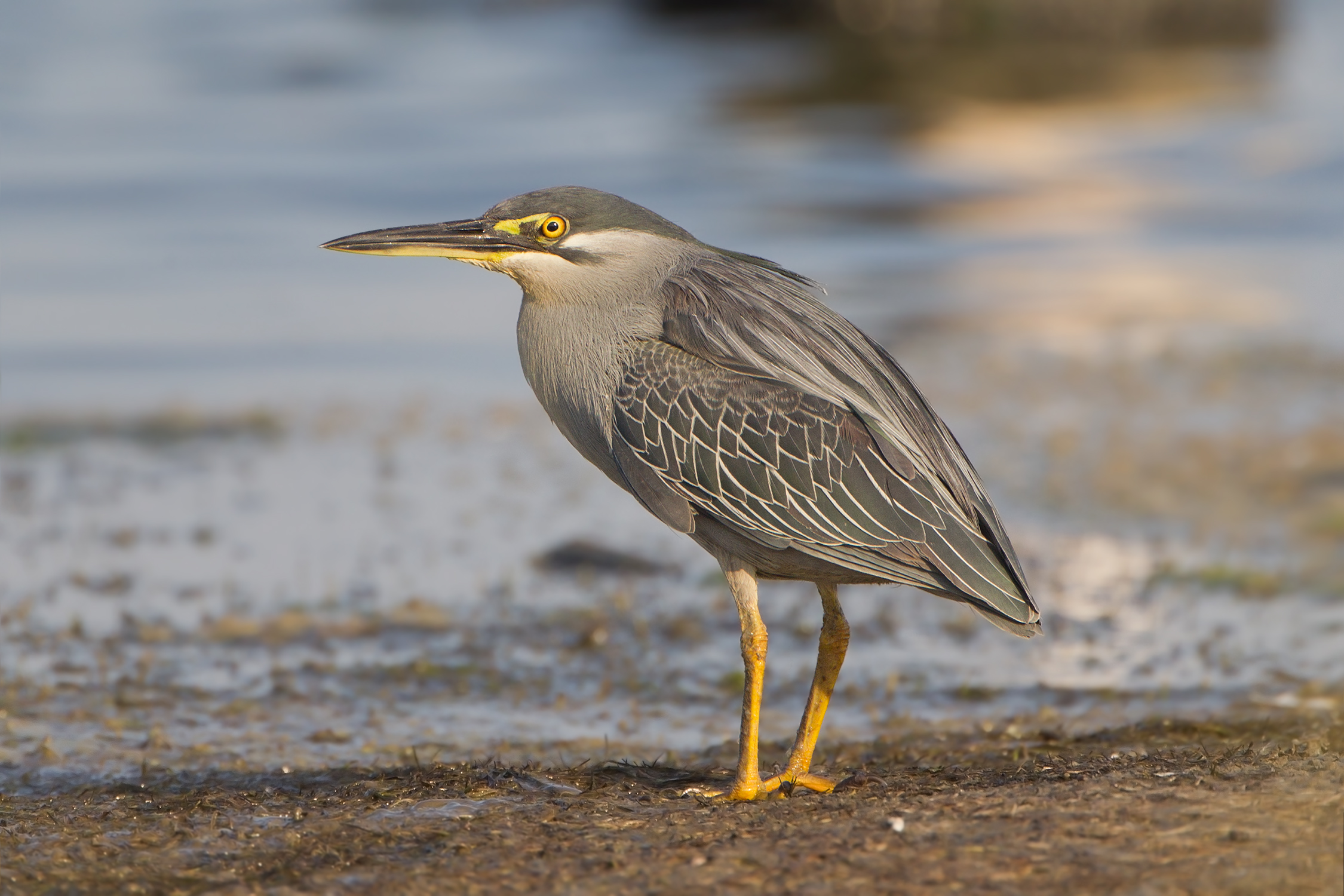
Striated heron

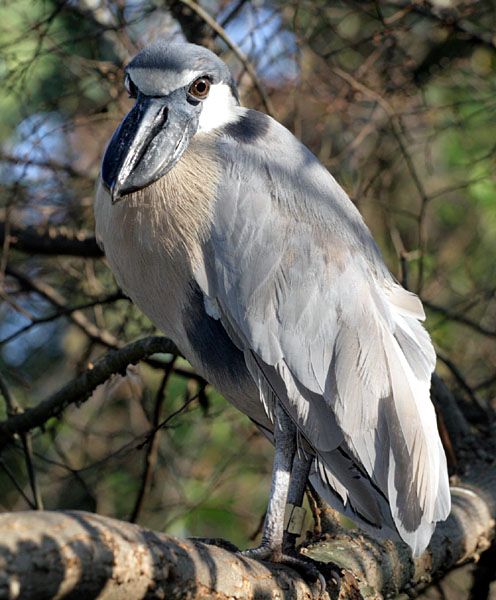
Boat-billed heron

== Ibises ==
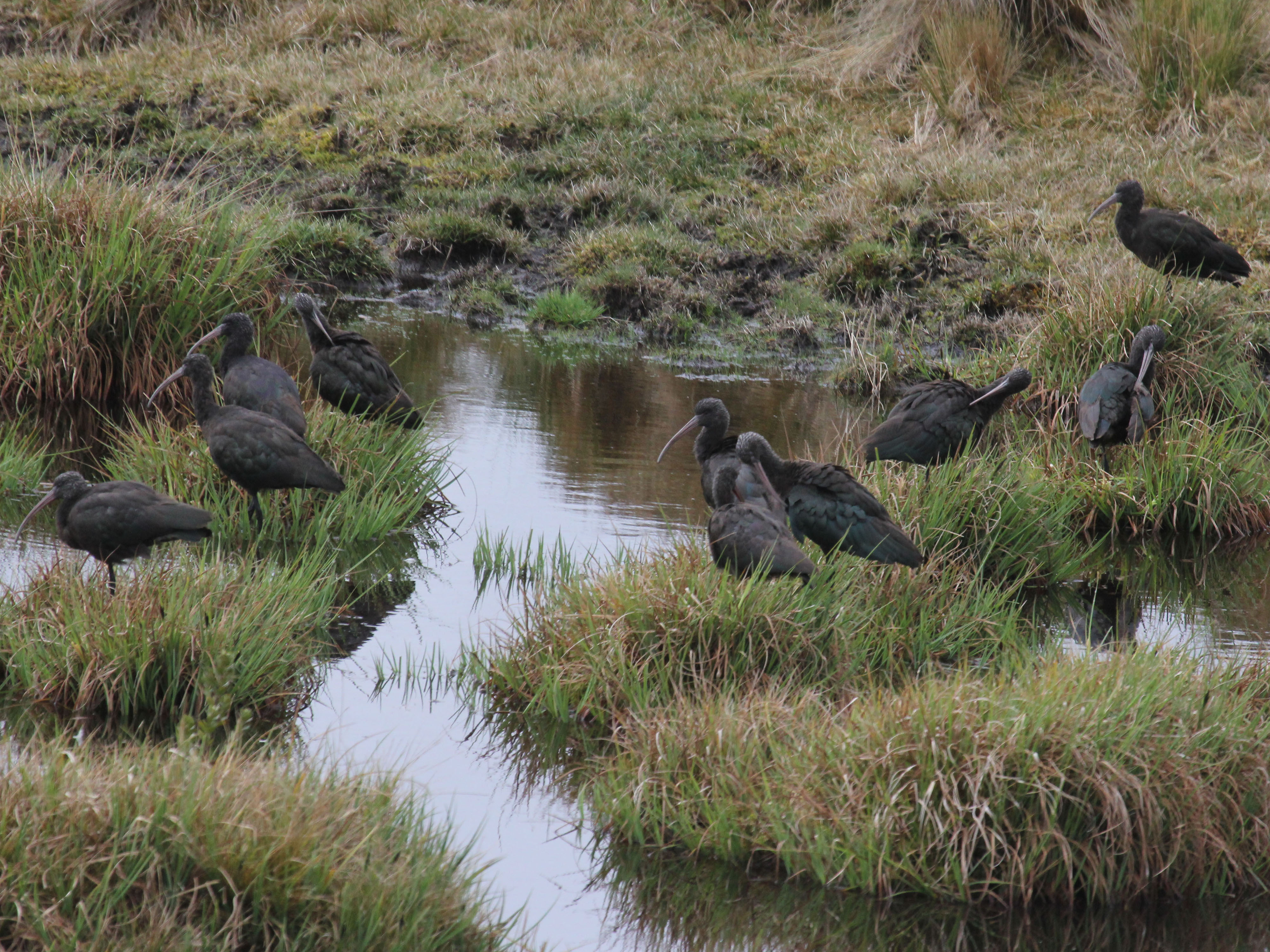
Flock of puna ibis

Order: Pelecaniformes Family: Threskiornithidae

Threskiornithidae is a family of large terrestrial and wading birds which includes the ibises and spoonbills. They have long, broad wings with 11 primary and about 20 secondary feathers. They are strong fliers and despite their size and weight, very capable soarers. Nine species have been recorded in Peru.

- White ibis, Eudocimus albus
- Scarlet ibis, Eudocimus ruber (V)
- Puna ibis, Plegadis ridgwayi
- Green ibis, Mesembrinibis cayennensis
- Bare-faced ibis, Phimosus infuscatus (V)
- Buff-necked ibis, Theristicus caudatus (V)
- Andean ibis, Theristicus branickii
- Black-faced ibis, Theristicus melanopis
- Roseate spoonbill, Platalea ajaja

== New World vultures ==
Order: Cathartiformes Family: Cathartidae

The New World vultures are not closely related to Old World vultures, but superficially resemble them because of convergent evolution. Like the Old World vultures, they are scavengers. However, unlike Old World vultures, which find carcasses by sight, New World vultures have a good sense of smell with which they locate carrion. Six species have been recorded in Peru.

- King vulture, Sarcoramphus papa
- Andean condor, Vultur gryphus
- Black vulture, Coragyps atratus
- Turkey vulture, Cathartes aura
- Lesser yellow-headed vulture, Cathartes burrovianus
- Greater yellow-headed vulture, Cathartes melambrotus

== Osprey ==
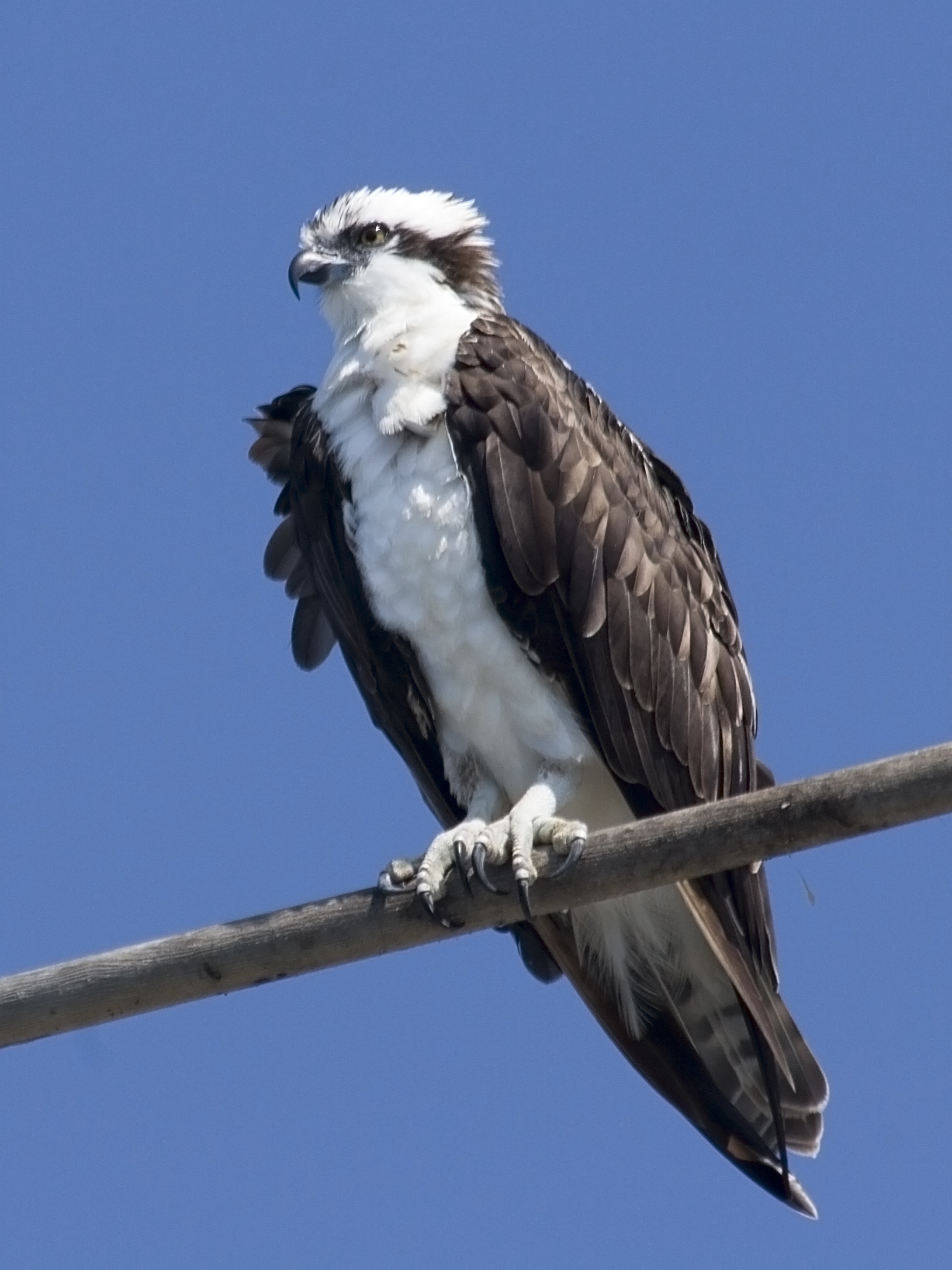
Osprey

Order: Accipitriformes Family: Pandionidae

The family Pandionidae contains only one species, the osprey. The osprey is a medium-large raptor which is a specialist fish-eater with a worldwide distribution.

- Osprey, Pandion haliaetus

== Hawks ==
Order: Accipitriformes Family: Accipitridae

Accipitridae is a family of birds of prey, which includes hawks, eagles, kites, harriers, and Old World vultures. These birds have powerful hooked beaks for tearing flesh from their prey, strong legs, powerful talons, and keen eyesight. Forty-seven species have been recorded in Peru.

- Pearl kite, Gampsonyx swainsonii
- White-tailed kite, Elanus leucurus
- Hook-billed kite, Chondrohierax uncinatus
- Gray-headed kite, Leptodon cayanensis
- Swallow-tailed kite, Elanoides forficatus
- Crested eagle, Morphnus guianensis
- Harpy eagle, Harpia harpyja
- Black hawk-eagle, Spizaetus tyrannus
- Black-and-white hawk-eagle, Spizaetus melanoleucus
- Ornate hawk-eagle, Spizaetus ornatus
- Black-and-chestnut eagle, Spizaetus isidori
- Black-collared hawk, Busarellus nigricollis
- Snail kite, Rostrhamus sociabilis
- Slender-billed kite, Helicolestes hamatus
- Double-toothed kite, Harpagus bidentatus
- Mississippi kite, Ictinia mississippiensis (V)
- Plumbeous kite, Ictinia plumbea
- Gray-bellied hawk, Accipiter poliogaster
- Sharp-shinned hawk, Accipiter striatus
- Bicolored hawk, Astur bicolor
- Cinereous harrier, Circus cinereus
- Long-winged harrier, Circus buffoni (V)
- Tiny hawk, Microspizias superciliosus
- Semicollared hawk, Microspizias collaris
- Crane hawk, Geranospiza caerulescens
- Slate-colored hawk, Buteogallus schistaceus
- Common black hawk, Buteogallus anthracinus
- Savanna hawk, Buteogallus meridionalis
- Great black hawk, Buteogallus urubitinga
- Solitary eagle, Buteogallus solitarius
- Barred hawk, Morphnarchus princeps
- Roadside hawk, Rupornis magnirostris
- Harris's hawk, Parabuteo unicinctus
- White-rumped hawk, Parabuteo leucorrhous
- White-tailed hawk, Geranoaetus albicaudatus
- Variable hawk, Geranoaetus polyosoma
- Black-chested buzzard-eagle, Geranoaetus melanoleucus
- White hawk, Pseudastur albicollis
- Gray-backed hawk, Pseudastur occidentalis
- Black-faced hawk, Leucopternis melanops
- White-browed hawk, Leucopternis kuhli
- Gray-lined hawk, Buteo nitidus
- Broad-winged hawk, Buteo platypterus
- White-throated hawk, Buteo albigula
- Short-tailed hawk, Buteo brachyurus
- Swainson's hawk, Buteo swainsoni (V)
- Zone-tailed hawk, Buteo albonotatus
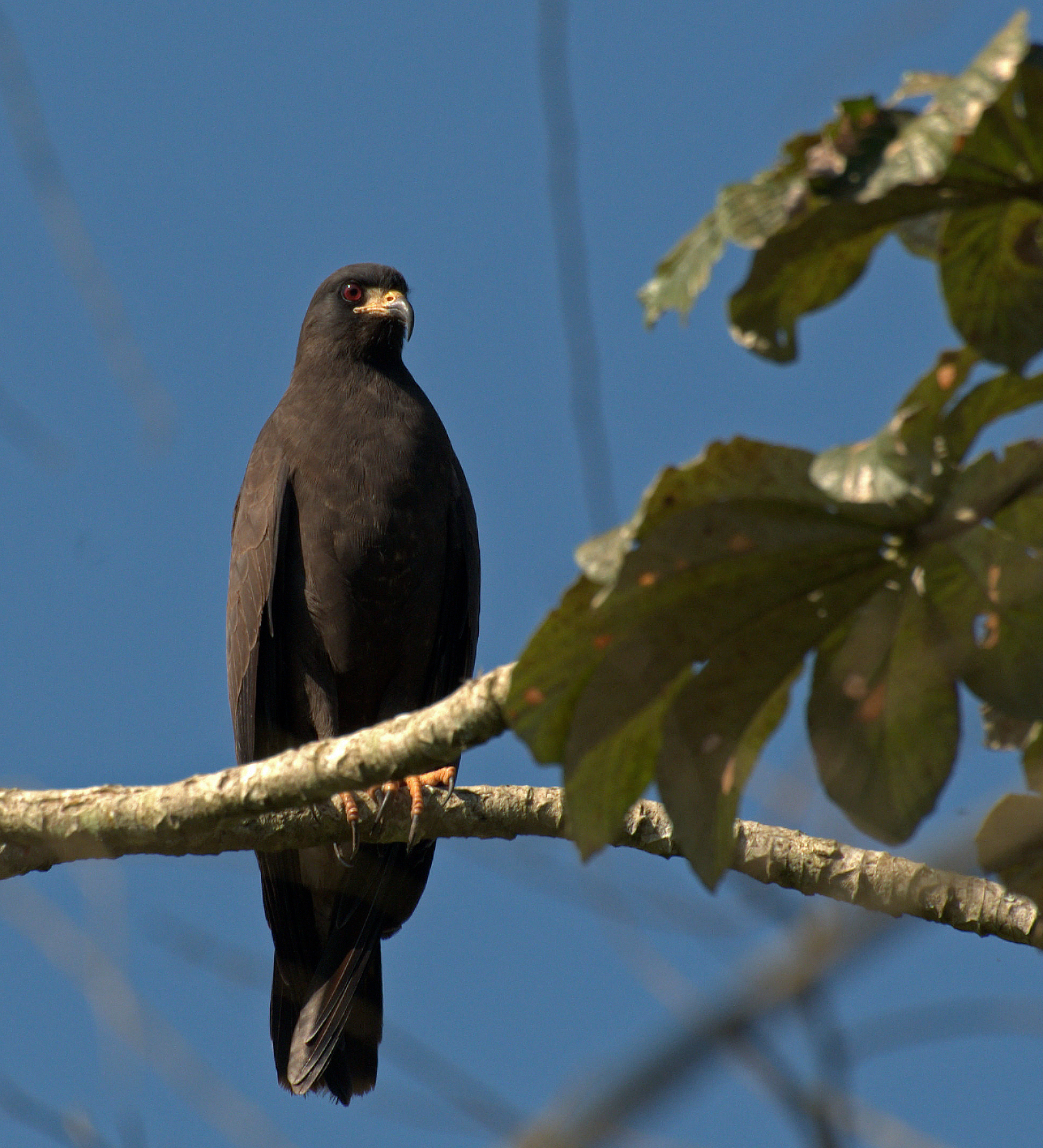
Snail kite

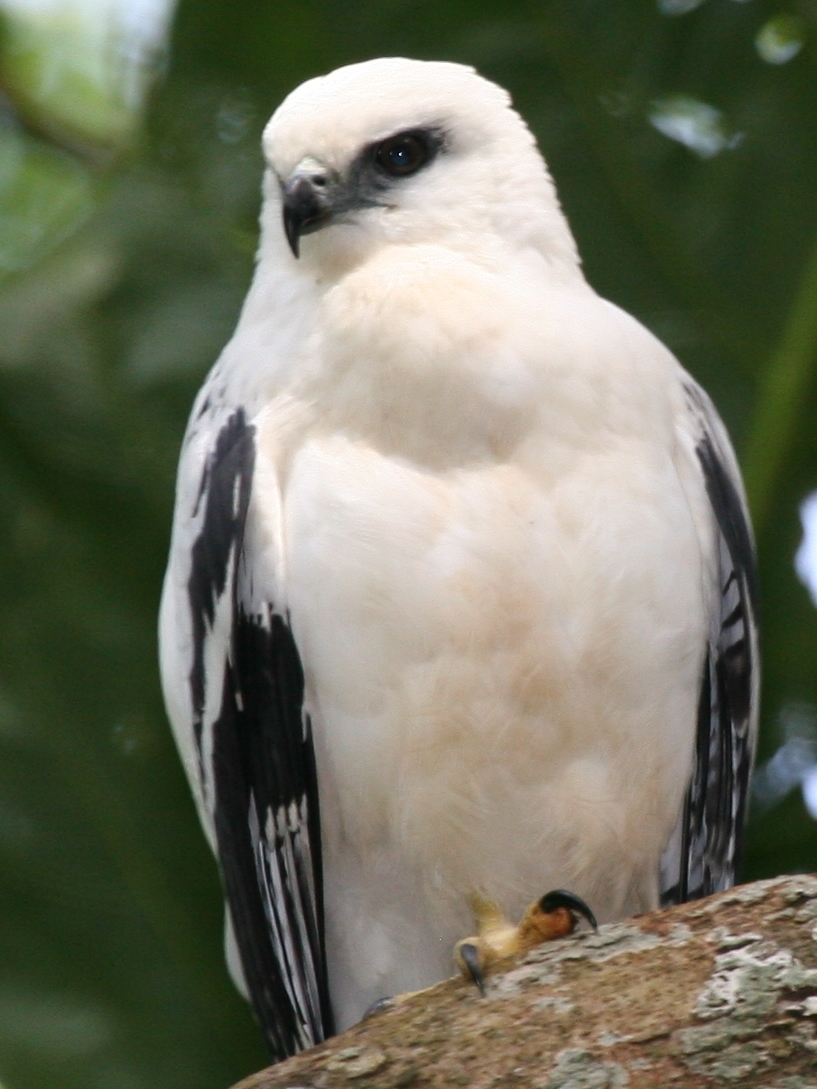
White hawk

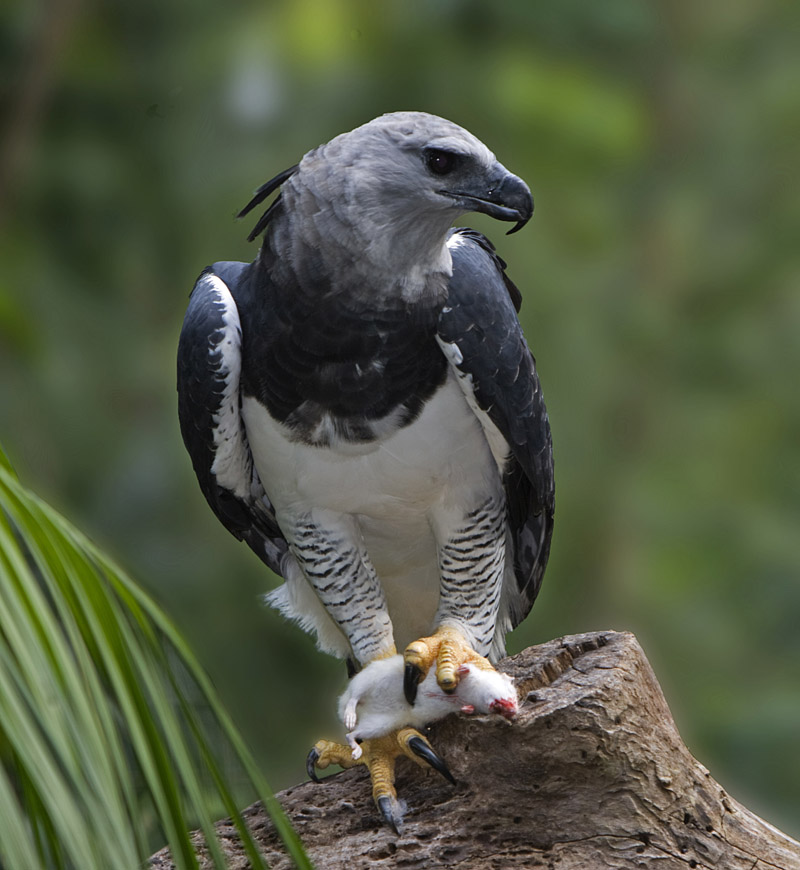
Harpy eagle

== Barn owls ==
Order: Strigiformes Family: Tytonidae

Barn owls are medium to large owls with large heads and characteristic heart-shaped faces. They have long strong legs with powerful talons. One species has been recorded in Peru.

- American barn owl, Tyto furcata

== Owls ==
Order: Strigiformes Family: Strigidae

The typical owls are small to large solitary nocturnal birds of prey. They have large forward-facing eyes and ears, a hawk-like beak, and a conspicuous circle of feathers around each eye called a facial disk. Thirty-one species have been recorded in Peru.

- White-throated screech-owl, Megascops albogularis
- Tropical screech-owl, Megascops choliba
- Koepcke's screech-owl, Megascops koepckeae
- Rufescent screech-owl, Megascops ingens
- Cinnamon screech-owl, Megascops petersoni
- Cloud-forest screech-owl, Megascops marshalli
- Foothill screech-owl, Megascops roraimae
- Peruvian screech-owl, Megascops roboratus
- Tawny-bellied screech-owl, Megascops watsonii
- Crested owl, Lophostrix cristata
- Spectacled owl, Pulsatrix perspicillata
- Band-bellied owl, Pulsatrix melanota
- Paramo horned owl, Bubo nigrescens
- Tropical horned owl, Bubo nacurutu
- Magellanic horned owl, Bubo magellanicus
- Mottled owl, Strix virgata
- Black-and-white owl, Strix nigrolineata
- Black-banded owl, Strix huhula
- Rufous-banded owl, Strix albitarsis
- Andean pygmy-owl, Glaucidium jardinii
- Yungas pygmy-owl, Glaucidium bolivianum
- Subtropical pygmy-owl, Glaucidium parkeri
- Amazonian pygmy-owl, Glaucidium hardyi
- Ferruginous pygmy-owl, Glaucidium brasilianum
- Peruvian pygmy-owl, Glaucidium peruanum
- Long-whiskered owlet, Xenoglaux loweryi (E)
- Burrowing owl, Athene cunicularia
- Buff-fronted owl, Aegolius harrisii
- Striped owl, Asio clamator
- Stygian owl, Asio stygius
- Short-eared owl, Asio flammeus

== Trogons ==
Order: Trogoniformes Family: Trogonidae

The family Trogonidae includes trogons and quetzals. Found in tropical woodlands worldwide, they feed on insects and fruit, and their broad bills and weak legs reflect their diet and arboreal habits. Although their flight is fast, they are reluctant to fly any distance. Trogons have soft, often colorful, feathers with distinctive male and female plumage. Twelve species have been recorded in Peru.

- Pavonine quetzal, Pharomachrus pavoninus
- Golden-headed quetzal, Pharomachrus auriceps
- Crested quetzal, Pharomachrus antisianus
- Ecuadorian trogon, Trogon mesurus
- Black-tailed trogon, Trogon melanurus
- Green-backed trogon, Trogon viridis
- Gartered violaceous-trogon, Trogon caligatus
- Amazonian violaceous-trogon, Trogon ramonianus
- Blue-crowned trogon, Trogon curucui
- Amazonian black-throated trogon, Trogon rufus
- Collared trogon, Trogon collaris
- Masked trogon, Trogon personatus

== Motmots ==
Order: Coraciiformes Family: Momotidae

The motmots have colorful plumage and long, graduated tails which they display by waggling back and forth. In most of the species, the barbs near the ends of the two longest (central) tail feathers are weak and fall off, leaving a length of bare shaft and creating a racket-shaped tail. Five species have been recorded in Peru.

- Broad-billed motmot, Electron platyrhynchum
- Rufous motmot, Baryphthengus martii
- Whooping motmot, Momotus subrufescens
- Amazonian motmot, Momotus momota
- Andean motmot, Momotus aequatorialis

== Kingfishers ==
Order: Coraciiformes Family: Alcedinidae

Kingfishers are medium-sized birds with large heads, long pointed bills, short legs, and stubby tails. Five species have been recorded in Peru.

- Ringed kingfisher, Megaceryle torquata
- Amazon kingfisher, Chloroceryle amazona
- American pygmy kingfisher, Chloroceryle aenea
- Green kingfisher, Chloroceryle americana
- Green-and-rufous kingfisher, Chloroceryle inda

== Jacamars ==
Order: Galbuliformes Family: Galbulidae

The jacamars are near passerine birds from tropical South America with a range that extends up to Mexico. They feed on insects caught on the wing and are glossy, elegant birds with long bills and tails. They resemble the Old World bee-eaters, although they are more closely related to puffbirds. Thirteen species that have been recorded in Peru.

- White-eared jacamar, Galbalcyrhynchus leucotis
- Purus jacamar, Galbalcyrhynchus purusianus
- White-throated jacamar, Brachygalba albogularis
- Brown jacamar, Brachygalba lugubris
- Yellow-billed jacamar, Galbula albirostris
- Blue-cheeked jacamar, Galbula cyanicollis
- White-chinned jacamar, Galbula tombacea
- Bluish-fronted jacamar, Galbula cyanescens
- Coppery-chested jacamar, Galbula pastazae
- Purplish jacamar, Galbula chalcothorax
- Bronzy jacamar, Galbula leucogastra
- Paradise jacamar, Galbula dea
- Great jacamar, Jacamerops aureus

== Puffbirds ==
Order: Galbuliformes Family: Bucconidae

The puffbirds are related to the jacamars and have the same range, but lack the iridescent colors of that family. They are mainly brown, rufous, or gray, with large heads and flattened bills with hooked tips. The loose abundant plumage and short tails makes them look stout and puffy, giving rise to the English common name of the family. Twenty-four species have been recorded in Peru.

- White-necked puffbird, Notharchus hyperrhynchus
- Brown-banded puffbird, Notharchus ordii
- Pied puffbird, Notharchus tectus
- Chestnut-capped puffbird, Bucco macrodactylus
- Spotted puffbird, Bucco tamatia
- Collared puffbird, Bucco capensis
- Barred puffbird, Nystalus radiatus
- Western striolated-puffbird, Nystalus obamai
- White-eared puffbird, Nystalus chacuru
- White-chested puffbird, Malacoptila fusca
- Semicollared puffbird, Malacoptila semicincta
- Rufous-necked puffbird, Malacoptila rufa
- White-whiskered puffbird, Malacoptila panamensis
- Black-streaked puffbird, Malacoptila fulvogularis
- Lanceolated monklet, Micromonacha lanceolata
- Rusty-breasted nunlet, Nonnula rubecula
- Fulvous-chinned nunlet, Nonnula sclateri
- Brown nunlet, Nonnula brunnea
- Rufous-capped nunlet, Nonnula ruficapilla
- White-faced nunbird, Hapaloptila castanea
- Black-fronted nunbird, Monasa nigrifrons
- White-fronted nunbird, Monasa morphoeus
- Yellow-billed nunbird, Monasa flavirostris
- Swallow-winged puffbird, Chelidoptera tenebrosa

== New World barbets ==
Order: Piciformes Family: Capitonidae

The barbets are plump birds, with short necks and large heads. They get their name from the bristles which fringe their heavy bills. Most species are brightly colored. Seven species have been recorded in Peru.

- Scarlet-crowned barbet, Capito aurovirens
- Scarlet-banded barbet, Capito wallacei (E)
- Gilded barbet, Capito auratus
- Lemon-throated barbet, Eubucco richardsoni
- Scarlet-hooded barbet, Eubucco tucinkae
- Red-headed barbet, Eubucco bourcierii
- Versicolored barbet, Eubucco versicolor

== Toucans ==
Order: Piciformes Family: Ramphastidae

Toucans are near passerine birds from the Neotropics. They are brightly marked and have enormous, colorful bills which in some species amount to half their body length. Nineteen species have been recorded in Peru.

- Toco toucan, Ramphastos toco (V)
- Yellow-throated toucan, Ramphastos ambiguus
- White-throated toucan, Ramphastos tucanus
- Choco toucan, Ramphastos brevis (V)
- Channel-billed toucan, Ramphastos vitellinus
- Southern emerald-toucanet, Aulacorhynchus albivitta
- Chestnut-tipped toucanet, Aulacorhynchus derbianus
- Yellow-browed toucanet, Aulacorhynchus huallagae (E)
- Blue-banded toucanet, Aulacorhynchus coeruleicinctis
- Gray-breasted mountain-toucan, Andigena hypoglauca
- Hooded mountain-toucan, Andigena cucullata
- Black-billed mountain-toucan, Andigena nigrirostris
- Golden-collared toucanet, Selenidera reinwardtii
- Lettered aracari, Pteroglossus inscriptus
- Collared aracari, Pteroglossus torquatus
- Chestnut-eared aracari, Pteroglossus castanotis
- Many-banded aracari, Pteroglossus pluricinctus
- Ivory-billed aracari, Pteroglossus azara
- Curl-crested aracari, Pteroglossus beauharnaisii

== Woodpeckers ==
Order: Piciformes Family: Picidae

Woodpeckers are small to medium-sized birds with chisel-like beaks, short legs, stiff tails, and long tongues used for capturing insects. Some species have feet with two toes pointing forward and two backward, while several species have only three toes. Many woodpeckers have the habit of tapping noisily on tree trunks with their beaks. Thirty-nine species have been recorded in Peru.

- Bar-breasted piculet, Picumnus aurifrons
- Lafresnaye's piculet, Picumnus lafresnayi
- Ecuadorian piculet, Picumnus sclateri
- Speckle-chested piculet, Picumnus steindachneri (E)
- Ocellated piculet, Picumnus dorbignyanus
- White-wedged piculet, Picumnus albosquamatus
- Rufous-breasted piculet, Picumnus rufiventris
- Plain-breasted piculet, Picumnus castelnau
- Fine-barred piculet, Picumnus subtilis
- Olivaceous piculet, Picumnus olivaceus
- White woodpecker, Melanerpes candidus (V)
- Yellow-tufted woodpecker, Melanerpes cruentatus
- Black-cheeked woodpecker, Melanerpes pucherani
- Smoky-brown woodpecker, Dryobates fumigatus
- Red-rumped woodpecker, Dryobates kirkii
- Little woodpecker, Dryobates passerinus
- Scarlet-backed woodpecker, Dryobates callonotus
- Yellow-vented woodpecker, Dryobates dignus
- Bar-bellied woodpecker, Dryobates nigriceps
- Red-stained woodpecker, Dryobates affinis
- Powerful woodpecker, Campephilus pollens
- Crimson-bellied woodpecker, Campephilus haematogaster
- Red-necked woodpecker, Campephilus rubricollis
- Crimson-crested woodpecker, Campephilus melanoleucos
- Guayaquil woodpecker, Campephilus gayaquilensis
- Lineated woodpecker, Dryocopus lineatus
- Ringed woodpecker, Celeus torquatus
- Variable woodpecker, Celeus undatus
- Cream-colored woodpecker, Celeus flavus
- Rufous-headed woodpecker, Celeus spectabilis
- Chestnut woodpecker, Celeus elegans
- White-throated woodpecker, Piculus leucolaemus
- Yellow-throated woodpecker, Piculus flavigula
- Golden-green woodpecker, Piculus chrysochloros
- Golden-olive woodpecker, Colaptes rubiginosus
- Crimson-mantled woodpecker, Colaptes rivolii
- Black-necked woodpecker, Colaptes atricollis (E)
- Spot-breasted woodpecker, Colaptes punctigula
- Andean flicker, Colaptes rupicola

== Falcons ==
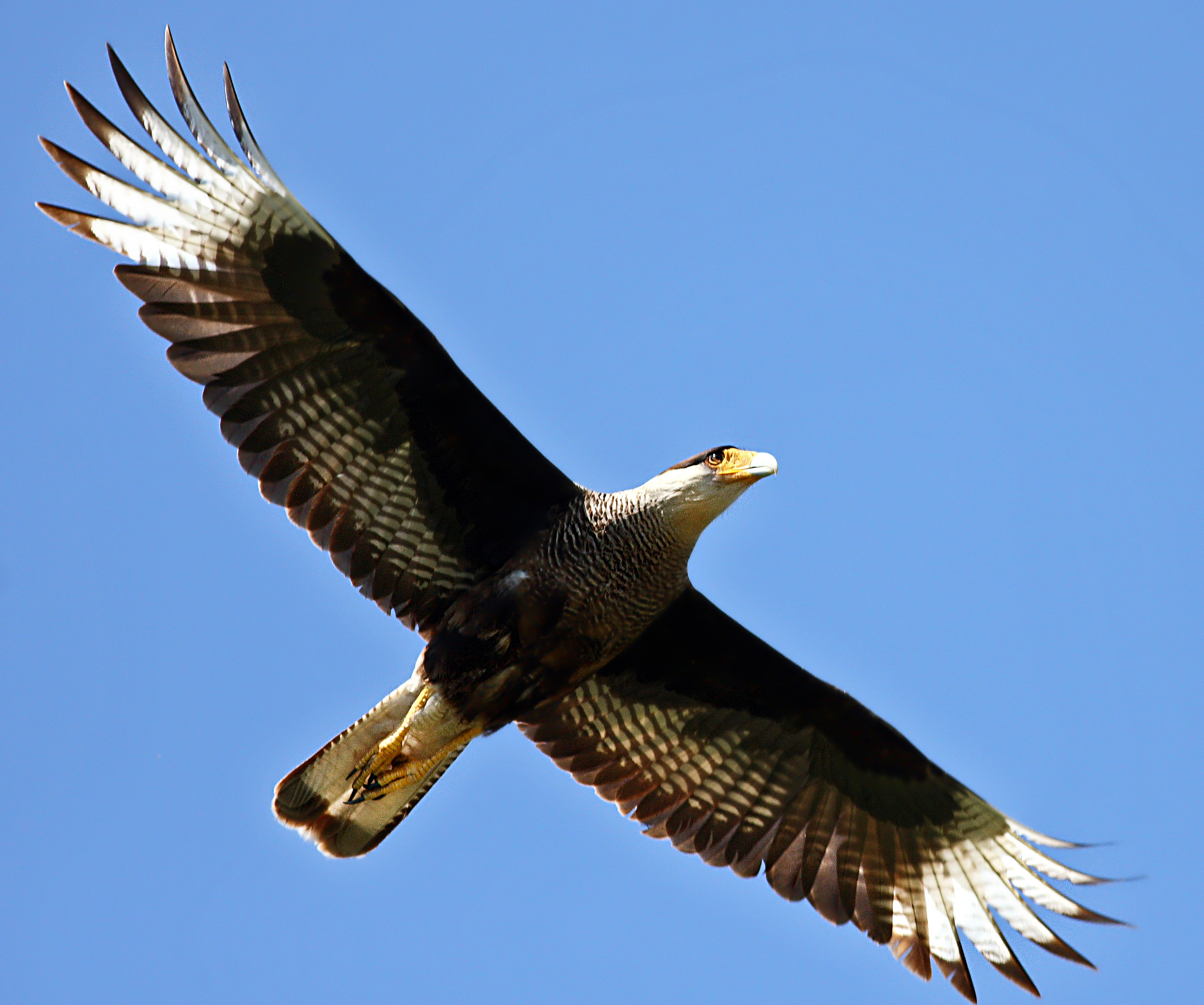
Crested caracara

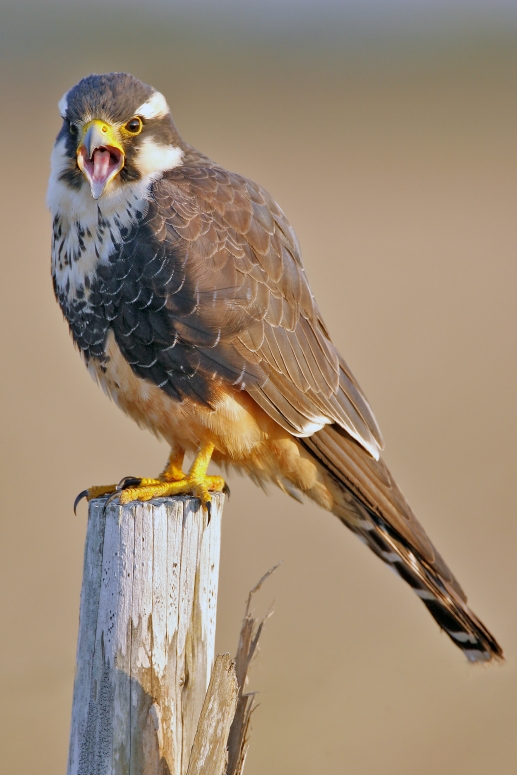
Aplomado falcon

Order: Falconiformes Family: Falconidae

Falconidae is a family of diurnal birds of prey. They differ from hawks, eagles, and kites in that they kill with their beaks instead of their talons. Seventeen species have been recorded in Peru.

- Laughing falcon, Herpetotheres cachinnans
- Barred forest-falcon, Micrastur ruficollis
- Lined forest-falcon, Micrastur gilvicollis
- Slaty-backed forest-falcon, Micrastur mirandollei
- Collared forest-falcon, Micrastur semitorquatus
- Buckley's forest-falcon, Micrastur buckleyi
- Crested caracara, Caracara plancus
- Red-throated caracara, Ibycter americanus
- Mountain caracara, Phalcoboenus megalopterus
- Black caracara, Daptrius ater
- Yellow-headed caracara, Milvago chimachima
- American kestrel, Falco sparverius
- Merlin, Falco columbarius
- Bat falcon, Falco rufigularis
- Orange-breasted falcon, Falco deiroleucus
- Aplomado falcon, Falco femoralis
- Peregrine falcon, Falco peregrinus

== New World and African parrots ==
Order: Psittaciformes Family: Psittacidae

Parrots are small to large birds with a characteristic curved beak. Their upper mandibles have slight mobility in the joint with the skull and they have a generally erect stance. All parrots are zygodactyl, having the four toes on each foot placed two at the front and two to the back. Fifty-three species have been recorded in Peru.

- Scarlet-shouldered parrotlet, Touit huetii
- Sapphire-rumped parrotlet, Touit purpuratus
- Spot-winged parrotlet, Touit stictopterus
- Mountain parakeet, Psilopsiagon aurifrons
- Barred parakeet, Bolborhynchus lineola
- Andean parakeet, Bolborhynchus orbygnesius
- Amazonian parrotlet, Nannopsittaca dachilleae
- Tui parakeet, Brotogeris sanctithomae
- Canary-winged parakeet, Brotogeris versicolurus
- Gray-cheeked parakeet, Brotogeris pyrrhoptera
- Cobalt-winged parakeet, Brotogeris cyanoptera
- Red-faced parrot, Hapalopsittaca pyrrhops
- Black-winged parrot, Hapalopsittaca melanotis
- Orange-cheeked parrot, Pyrilia barrabandi
- Red-billed parrot, Pionus sordidus
- Speckle-faced parrot, Pionus tumultuosus
- Blue-headed parrot, Pionus menstruus
- Bronze-winged parrot, Pionus chalcopterus
- Short-tailed parrot, Graydidascalus brachyurus
- Festive amazon, Amazona festiva
- Yellow-crowned amazon, Amazona ochrocephala
- Turquoise-fronted amazon, Amazona aestiva (V)
- Mealy amazon, Amazona farinosa
- Orange-winged amazon, Amazona amazonica
- Scaly-naped amazon, Amazona mercenarius
- Dusky-billed parrotlet, Forpus modestus
- Riparian parrotlet, Forpus crassirostris
- Pacific parrotlet, Forpus coelestis
- Yellow-faced parrotlet, Forpus xanthops (E)
- Cobalt-rumped parrotlet, Forpus xanthopterygius
- Black-headed parrot, Pionites melanocephalus
- White-bellied parrot, Pionites leucogaster
- Red-fan parrot, Deroptyus accipitrinus
- Bonaparte's parakeet, Pyrrhura lucianii
- Rose-fronted parakeet, Pyrrhura roseifrons
- Maroon-tailed parakeet, Pyrrhura melanura
- Black-capped parakeet, Pyrrhura rupicola
- White-necked parakeet, Pyrrhura albipectus
- Peach-fronted parakeet, Eupsittula aurea
- Dusky-headed parakeet, Aratinga weddellii
- Red-bellied macaw, Orthopsittaca manilatus
- Blue-headed macaw, Primolius couloni
- Blue-and-yellow macaw, Ara ararauna
- Chestnut-fronted macaw, Ara severus
- Military macaw, Ara militaris
- Scarlet macaw, Ara macao
- Red-and-green macaw, Ara chloropterus
- Golden-plumed parakeet, Leptosittaca branickii
- Red-shouldered macaw, Diopsittaca nobilis
- Cordilleran parakeet, Psittacara frontatus
- Mitred parakeet, Psittacara mitratus
- Red-masked parakeet, Psittacara erythrogenys
- White-eyed parakeet, Psittacara leucophthalmus

== Antbirds ==
Order: Passeriformes Family: Thamnophilidae

The antbirds are a large family of small passerine birds of subtropical and tropical Central and South America. They are forest birds which tend to feed on insects at or near the ground. A sizable minority of them specialize in following columns of army ants to eat small invertebrates that leave their hiding places to flee from the ants. Many species lack bright color, with brown, black, and white being the dominant tones. One hundred seventeen species have been recorded in Peru.

- Rufous-rumped antwren, Euchrepomis callinota
- Chestnut-shouldered antwren, Euchrepomis humeralis
- Yellow-rumped antwren, Euchrepomis sharpei
- Ash-winged antwren, Euchrepomis spodioptila (U)
- Fasciated antshrike, Cymbilaimus lineatus
- Bamboo antshrike, Cymbilaimus sanctaemariae
- Undulated antshrike, Frederickena unduliger
- Fulvous antshrike, Frederickena fulva
- Great antshrike, Taraba major
- Black-crested antshrike, Sakesphorus canadensis
- Barred antshrike, Thamnophilus doliatus
- Rufous-capped antshrike, Thamnophilus ruficapillus
- Chapman's antshrike, Thamnophilus zarumae
- Lined antshrike, Thamnophilus tenuepunctatus
- Chestnut-backed antshrike, Thamnophilus palliatus
- Collared antshrike, Thamnophilus bernardi
- Black-crowned antshrike, Thamnophilus atrinucha
- Plain-winged antshrike, Thamnophilus schistaceus
- Mouse-colored antshrike, Thamnophilus murinus
- Cocha antshrike, Thamnophilus praecox
- Castelnau's antshrike, Thamnophilus cryptoleucus
- Northern slaty-antshrike, Thamnophilus punctatus
- Variable antshrike, Thamnophilus caerulescens
- Uniform antshrike, Thamnophilus unicolor
- White-shouldered antshrike, Thamnophilus aethiops
- Upland antshrike, Thamnophilus aroyae
- Amazonian antshrike, Thamnophilus amazonicus
- Acre antshrike, Thamnophilus divisorius
- Pearly antshrike, Megastictus margaritatus
- Black bushbird, Neoctantes niger
- Rufescent antshrike, Thamnistes rufescens
- Plain antvireo, Dysithamnus mentalis
- Bicolored antvireo, Dysithamnus occidentalis
- White-streaked antvireo, Dysithamnus leucostictus
- Ash-throated antwren, Herpsilochmus parkeri (E)
- Creamy-bellied antwren, Herpsilochmus motacilloides (E)
- Dugand's antwren, Herpsilochmus dugandi
- Ancient antwren, Herpsilochmus gentryi
- Yellow-breasted antwren, Herpsilochmus axillaris
- Rusty-winged antwren, Herpsilochmus rufimarginatus
- Dusky-throated antshrike, Thamnomanes ardesiacus
- Saturnine antshrike, Thamnomanes saturninus
- Cinereous antshrike, Thamnomanes caesius
- Bluish-slate antshrike, Thamnomanes schistogynus
- Plain-throated antwren, Isleria hauxwelli
- Spot-winged antshrike, Pygiptila stellaris
- Ornate stipplethroat, Epinecrophylla ornata
- Rufous-tailed stipplethroat, Epinecrophylla erythrura
- White-eyed stipplethroat, Epinecrophylla leucophthalma
- Rufous-backed stipplethroat, Epinecrophylla haematonota
- Foothill stipplethroat, Epinecrophylla spodionota
- Rio Madeira stipplethroat, Epinecrophylla amazonica
- Pygmy antwren, Myrmotherula brachyura
- Moustached antwren, Myrmotherula ignota
- Sclater's antwren, Myrmotherula sclateri
- Amazonian streaked-antwren, Myrmotherula multostriata
- Cherrie's antwren, Myrmotherula cherriei
- Stripe-chested antwren, Myrmotherula longicauda
- White-flanked antwren, Myrmotherula axillaris
- Slaty antwren, Myrmotherula schisticolor
- Rio Suno antwren, Myrmotherula sunensis
- Long-winged antwren, Myrmotherula longipennis
- Ihering's antwren, Myrmotherula iheringi
- Ashy antwren, Myrmotherula grisea
- Gray antwren, Myrmotherula menetriesii
- Leaden antwren, Myrmotherula assimilis
- Banded antbird, Dichrozona cincta
- Dot-winged antwren, Microrhopias quixensis
- White-fringed antwren, Formicivora grisea
- Rusty-backed antwren, Formicivora rufa
- Striated antbird, Drymophila devillei
- Streak-headed antbird, Drymophila striaticeps
- Peruvian warbling-antbird, Hypocnemis peruviana
- Yellow-breasted warbling-antbird, Hypocnemis subflava
- Yellow-browed antbird, Hypocnemis hypoxantha
- Black antbird, Cercomacroides serva
- Blackish antbird, Cercomacroides nigrescens
- Riparian antbird, Cercomacroides fuscicauda
- Manu antbird, Cercomacra manu
- Gray antbird, Cercomacra cinerascens
- Western fire-eye, Pyriglena maura
- White-browed antbird, Myrmoborus leucophrys
- Ash-breasted antbird, Myrmoborus lugubris
- Black-faced antbird, Myrmoborus myotherinus
- Black-tailed antbird, Myrmoborus melanurus
- White-lined antbird, Myrmoborus lophotes
- Black-chinned antbird, Hypocnemoides melanopogon
- Band-tailed antbird, Hypocnemoides maculicauda
- Black-and-white antbird, Myrmochanes hemileucus
- Silvered antbird, Sclateria naevia
- Black-headed antbird, Percnostola rufifrons
- Allpahuayo antbird, Percnostola arenarum (E)
- Slate-colored antbird, Myrmelastes schistaceus
- Plumbeous antbird, Myrmelastes hyperythrus
- Spot-winged antbird, Myrmelastes leucostigma
- Humaita antbird, Myrmelastes humaythae
- Brownish-headed antbird, Myrmelastes brunneiceps
- Gray-headed antbird, Ampelornis griseiceps
- Chestnut-tailed antbird, Sciaphylax hemimelaena
- Zimmer's antbird, Sciaphylax castanea
- Cordillera Azul antbird, Myrmoderus eowilsoni (E)
- White-shouldered antbird, Akletos melanoceps
- Goeldi's antbird, Akletos goeldii
- Sooty antbird, Hafferia fortis
- Black-throated antbird, Myrmophylax atrothorax
- Wing-banded antbird, Myrmornis torquata
- White-plumed antbird, Pithys albifrons
- White-masked antbird, Pithys castaneus (E)
- White-cheeked antbird, Gymnopithys leucaspis
- White-throated antbird, Oneillornis salvini
- Lunulated antbird, Oneillornis lunulatus
- Hairy-crested antbird, Rhegmatorhina melanosticta
- Spot-backed antbird, Hylophylax naevius
- Dot-backed antbird, Hylophylax punctulatus
- Common scale-backed antbird, Willisornis poecilinotus
- Black-spotted bare-eye, Phlegopsis nigromaculata
- Reddish-winged bare-eye, Phlegopsis erythroptera

== Crescentchests ==
Order: Passeriformes Family: Melanopareiidae

These are smallish birds which inhabit regions of arid scrub. They have a band across the chest which gives them their name.

- Marañon crescentchest, Melanopareia maranonica
- Elegant crescentchest, Melanopareia elegans

== Gnateaters ==
Order: Passeriformes Family: Conopophagidae

The gnateaters are round, short-tailed and long-legged birds, which are closely related to the antbirds. Four species have been recorded in Peru.

- Chestnut-belted gnateater, Conopophaga aurita
- Ash-throated gnateater, Conopophaga peruviana
- Chestnut-crowned gnateater, Conopophaga castaneiceps
- Slaty gnateater, Conopophaga ardesiaca

== Antpittas ==
Order: Passeriformes Family: Grallariidae

Antpittas resemble the true pittas with strong, longish legs, very short tails and stout bills. Thirty-eight species have been recorded in Peru.

- Undulated antpitta, Grallaria squamigera
- Variegated antpitta, Grallaria varia
- Scaled antpitta, Grallaria guatimalensis
- Plain-backed antpitta, Grallaria haplonota
- Ochre-striped antpitta, Grallaria dignissima
- Elusive antpitta, Grallaria eludens
- Chestnut-crowned antpitta, Grallaria ruficapilla
- Watkins's antpitta, Grallaria watkinsi
- Stripe-headed antpitta, Grallaria andicola
- Jocotoco antpitta, Grallaria ridgelyi
- Chestnut-naped antpitta, Grallaria nuchalis
- Pale-billed antpitta, Grallaria carrikeri (E)
- White-throated antpitta, Grallaria albigula
- White-bellied antpitta, Grallaria hypoleuca
- Rusty-tinged antpitta, Grallaria przewalskii (E)
- Bay antpitta, Grallaria capitalis (E)
- Red-and-white antpitta, Grallaria erythroleuca (E)
- Chestnut antpitta, Grallaria blakei (E)
- Urubamba antpitta, Grallaria occabambae (E)
- Equatorial antpitta, Grallaria saturata
- Cajamarca antpitta, Grallaria cajamarcae (E)
- Graves's antpitta, Grallaria gravesi (E)
- O'Neill's antpitta, Grallaria oneilli (E)
- Junin antpitta, Grallaria obscura (E)
- Oxapampa antpitta, Grallaria centralis (E)
- Ayacucho antpitta, Grallaria ayacuchensis (E)
- Puno antpitta, Grallaria sinaensis
- Tawny antpitta, Grallaria quitensis
- Rufous-faced antpitta, Grallaria erythrotis
- Ochre-breasted antpitta, Grallaricula flavirostris
- Peruvian antpitta, Grallaricula peruviana
- Ochre-fronted antpitta, Grallaricula ochraceifrons (E)
- Leymebamba antpitta, Grallaricula leymebambae
- Slate-crowned antpitta, Grallaricula nana
- Spotted antpitta, Hylopezus macularius
- White-lored antpitta, Myrmothera fulviventris
- Amazonian antpitta, Myrmothera berlepschi
- Thrush-like antpitta, Myrmothera campanisona

== Tapaculos ==
Order: Passeriformes Family: Rhinocryptidae

The tapaculos are small suboscine passeriform birds with numerous species in South and Central America. They are terrestrial species that fly only poorly on their short wings. They have strong legs, well-suited to their habitat of grassland or forest undergrowth. The tail is cocked and pointed towards the head. Peru has the largest number of tapaculos of any country; twenty have been recorded there.

- Rusty-belted tapaculo, Liosceles thoracicus
- Ocellated tapaculo, Acropternis orthonyx
- Ash-colored tapaculo, Myornis senilis
- Ancash tapaculo, Scytalopus affinis (E)
- White-winged tapaculo, Scytalopus krabbei (E)
- Loja tapaculo, Scytalopus androstictus
- Puna tapaculo, Scytalopus simonsi
- Diademed tapaculo, Scytalopus schulenbergi
- Vilcabamba tapaculo, Scytalopus urubambae (E)
- Ampay tapaculo, Scytalopus whitneyi (E)
- Jalca tapaculo, Scytalopus frankeae (E)
- Neblina tapaculo, Scytalopus altirostris (E)
- Trilling tapaculo, Scytalopus parvirostris
- Bolivian tapaculo, Scytalopus bolivianus
- White-crowned tapaculo, Scytalopus atratus
- Long-tailed tapaculo, Scytalopus micropterus
- Rufous-vented tapaculo, Scytalopus femoralis (E)
- Utcubamba tapaculo, Scytalopus intermedius (E)
- Large-footed tapaculo, Scytalopus macropus (E)
- Junin tapaculo, Scytalopus gettyae (E)
- Unicolored tapaculo, Scytalopus unicolor (E)
- Tschudi's tapaculo, Scytalopus acutirostris (E)
- Blackish tapaculo, Scytalopus latrans
- Chusquea tapaculo, Scytalopus parkeri

== Antthrushes ==
Order: Passeriformes Family: Formicariidae

Antthrushes resemble small rails. Seven species have been recorded in Peru.

- Rufous-capped antthrush, Formicarius colma
- Black-faced antthrush, Formicarius analis
- Rufous-fronted antthrush, Formicarius rufifrons
- Rufous-breasted antthrush, Formicarius rufipectus
- Short-tailed antthrush, Chamaeza campanisona
- Striated antthrush, Chamaeza nobilis
- Barred antthrush, Chamaeza mollissima

== Ovenbirds ==
Order: Passeriformes Family: Furnariidae

Ovenbirds comprise a large family of small sub-oscine passerine bird species found in Central and South America. They are a diverse group of insectivores which gets its name from the elaborate "oven-like" clay nests built by some species, although others build stick nests or nest in tunnels or clefts in rock. The woodcreepers are brownish birds which maintain an upright vertical posture, supported by their stiff tail vanes. They feed mainly on insects taken from tree trunks. One hundred fifty-four species have been recorded in Peru.

- South American leaftosser, Sclerurus obscurior
- Short-billed leaftosser, Sclerurus rufigularis
- Black-tailed leaftosser, Sclerurus caudacutus
- Gray-throated leaftosser, Sclerurus albigularis
- Coastal miner, Geositta peruviana (E)
- Slender-billed miner, Geositta tenuirostris
- Common miner, Geositta cunicularia
- Puna miner, Geositta punensis
- Thick-billed miner, Geositta crassirostris (E)
- Grayish miner, Geositta maritima
- Dark-winged miner, Geositta saxicolina (E)
- Spot-throated woodcreeper, Certhiasomus stictolaemus
- Olivaceous woodcreeper, Sittasomus griseicapillus
- Mournful long-tailed woodcreeper, Deconychura pallida
- Tyrannine woodcreeper, Dendrocincla tyrannina
- White-chinned woodcreeper, Dendrocincla merula
- Plain-brown woodcreeper, Dendrocincla fuliginosa
- Wedge-billed woodcreeper, Glyphorynchus spirurus
- Cinnamon-throated woodcreeper, Dendrexetastes rufigula
- Long-billed woodcreeper, Nasica longirostris
- Amazonian barred-woodcreeper, Dendrocolaptes certhia
- Black-banded woodcreeper, Dendrocolaptes picumnus
- Bar-bellied woodcreeper, Hylexetastes stresemanni
- Strong-billed woodcreeper, Xiphocolaptes promeropirhynchus
- Striped woodcreeper, Xiphorhynchus obsoletus
- Ocellated woodcreeper, Xiphorhynchus ocellatus
- Elegant woodcreeper, Xiphorhynchus elegans
- Buff-throated woodcreeper, Xiphorhynchus guttatus
- Olive-backed woodcreeper, Xiphorhynchus triangularis
- Straight-billed woodcreeper, Dendroplex picus
- Zimmer's woodcreeper, Dendroplex kienerii
- Red-billed scythebill, Campylorhamphus trochilirostris
- Curve-billed scythebill, Campylorhamphus procurvoides
- Brown-billed scythebill, Campylorhamphus pusillus
- Greater scythebill, Drymotoxeres pucheranii
- Streak-headed woodcreeper, Lepidocolaptes souleyetii
- Montane woodcreeper, Lepidocolaptes lacrymiger
- Duida woodcreeper, Lepidocolaptes duidae
- Inambari woodcreeper, Lepidocolaptes fatimalimae
- Slender-billed xenops, Xenops tenuirostris
- Northern plain-xenops, Xenops mexicanus
- Amazonian plain-xenops, Xenops genibarbis
- Streaked xenops, Xenops rutilans
- Point-tailed palmcreeper, Berlepschia rikeri
- Rufous-tailed xenops, Microxenops milleri
- Straight-billed earthcreeper, Ochetorhynchus ruficaudus
- Streaked tuftedcheek, Pseudocolaptes boissonneautii
- Rusty-winged barbtail, Premnornis guttuliger
- Pale-legged hornero, Furnarius leucopus
- Pale-billed hornero, Furnarius torridus
- Lesser hornero, Furnarius minor
- Sharp-tailed streamcreeper, Lochmias nematura
- Wren-like rushbird, Phleocryptes melanops
- Striated earthcreeper, Geocerthia serrana (E)
- Scale-throated earthcreeper, Upucerthia dumetaria
- White-throated earthcreeper, Upucerthia albigula
- Buff-breasted earthcreeper, Upucerthia validirostris
- Chestnut-winged cinclodes, Cinclodes albidiventris
- Cream-winged cinclodes, Cinclodes albiventris
- Royal cinclodes, Cinclodes aricomae
- White-bellied cinclodes, Cinclodes palliatus (E)
- White-winged cinclodes, Cinclodes atacamensis
- Surf cinclodes, Cinclodes taczanowskii (E)
- Dusky-cheeked foliage-gleaner, Anabazenops dorsalis
- Rufous-rumped foliage-gleaner, Neophilydor erythrocercum
- Cinnamon-rumped foliage-gleaner, Philydor pyrrhodes
- Montane foliage-gleaner, Anabacerthia striaticollis
- Rufous-tailed foliage-gleaner, Anabacerthia ruficaudata
- Buff-browed foliage-gleaner, Syndactyla rufosuperciliata
- Lineated foliage-gleaner, Syndactyla subalaris
- Rufous-necked foliage-gleaner, Syndactyla ruficollis
- Peruvian recurvebill, Syndactyla ucayalae
- Bolivian recurvebill, Syndactyla striata
- Chestnut-winged hookbill, Ancistrops strigilatus
- Buff-fronted foliage-gleaner, Dendroma rufa
- Chestnut-winged foliage-gleaner, Dendroma erythroptera
- Henna-hooded foliage-gleaner, Clibanornis erythrocephalus
- Ruddy foliage-gleaner, Clibanornis rubiginosus
- Flammulated treehunter, Thripadectes flammulatus
- Rufous-backed treehunter, Thripadectes scrutator
- Striped treehunter, Thripadectes holostictus
- Black-billed treehunter, Thripadectes melanorhynchus
- Chestnut-crowned foliage-gleaner, Automolus rufipileatus
- Brown-rumped foliage-gleaner, Automolus melanopezus
- Buff-throated foliage-gleaner, Automolus ochrolaemus
- Striped woodhaunter, Automolus subulatus
- Olive-backed foliage-gleaner, Automolus infuscatus
- Spotted barbtail, Premnoplex brunnescens
- Pearled treerunner, Margarornis squamiger
- Tawny tit-spinetail, Sylviorthorhynchus yanacensis
- Plain-mantled tit-spinetail, Leptasthenura aegithaloides
- Rusty-crowned tit-spinetail, Leptasthenura pileata (E)
- White-browed tit-spinetail, Leptasthenura xenothorax (E)
- Streaked tit-spinetail, Leptasthenura striata
- Andean tit-spinetail, Leptasthenura andicola
- Rufous-fronted thornbird, Phacellodomus rufifrons
- Streak-fronted thornbird, Phacellodomus striaticeps
- Chestnut-backed thornbird, Phacellodomus dorsalis (E)
- White-browed spinetail, Hellmayrea gularis
- Creamy-breasted canastero, Asthenes dorbignyi
- Line-fronted canastero, Asthenes urubambensis
- Many-striped canastero, Asthenes flammulata
- Junin canastero, Asthenes virgata (E)
- Scribble-tailed canastero, Asthenes maculicauda
- Streak-backed canastero, Asthenes wyatti
- Puna canastero, Asthenes sclateri
- Streak-throated canastero, Asthenes humilis
- Cordilleran canastero, Asthenes modesta
- Puna thistletail, Asthenes helleri
- Ayacucho thistletail, Asthenes ayacuchensis (E)
- Vilcabamba thistletail, Asthenes vilcabambae (E)
- Canyon canastero, Asthenes pudibunda
- Rusty-fronted canastero, Asthenes ottonis (E)
- Eye-ringed thistletail, Asthenes palpebralis (E)
- White-chinned thistletail, Asthenes fuliginosa
- Mouse-colored thistletail, Asthenes griseomurina
- Orange-fronted plushcrown, Metopothrix aurantiaca
- Equatorial graytail, Xenerpestes singularis
- Spectacled prickletail, Siptornis striaticollis
- Plain softtail, Thripophaga fusciceps
- Russet-mantled softtail, Thripophaga berlepschi (E)
- Marcapata spinetail, Cranioleuca marcapatae (E)
- Vilcabamba spinetail, Cranioleuca weskei (E)
- Light-crowned spinetail, Cranioleuca albiceps
- Rusty-backed spinetail, Cranioleuca vulpina
- Parker's spinetail, Cranioleuca vulpecula
- Creamy-crested spinetail, Cranioleuca albicapilla (E)
- Ash-browed spinetail, Cranioleuca curtata
- Line-cheeked spinetail, Cranioleuca antisiensis
- Speckled spinetail, Cranioleuca gutturata
- Cactus canastero, Pseudasthenes cactorum (E)
- Yellow-chinned spinetail, Certhiaxis cinnamomeus
- Red-and-white spinetail, Certhiaxis mustelinus
- White-bellied spinetail, Mazaria propinqua
- Ochre-cheeked spinetail, Synallaxis scutata
- Plain-crowned spinetail, Synallaxis gujanensis
- Marañon spinetail, Synallaxis maranonica
- Great spinetail, Synallaxis hypochondriaca (E)
- Necklaced spinetail, Synallaxis stictothorax
- Chinchipe spinetail, Synallaxis chinchipensis (E)
- Russet-bellied spinetail, Synallaxis zimmeri (E)
- Slaty spinetail, Synallaxis brachyura
- Dusky spinetail, Synallaxis moesta
- Cabanis's spinetail, Synallaxis cabanisi
- Cinereous-breasted spinetail, Synallaxis hypospodia
- Dark-breasted spinetail, Synallaxis albigularis
- Pale-breasted spinetail, Synallaxis albescens
- Azara's spinetail, Synallaxis azarae
- Apurimac spinetail, Synallaxis courseni (E)
- Blackish-headed spinetail, Synallaxis tithys
- Rufous spinetail, Synallaxis unirufa
- Ruddy spinetail, Synallaxis rutilans
- Chestnut-throated spinetail, Synallaxis cherriei

== Manakins ==
Order: Passeriformes Family: Pipridae

The manakins are a family of subtropical and tropical mainland Central and South America, and Trinidad and Tobago. They are compact forest birds, the males typically being brightly colored, although the females of most species are duller and usually green-plumaged. Manakins feed on small fruits, berries and insects. Twenty-four species have been recorded in Peru.

- Dwarf tyrant-manakin, Tyranneutes stolzmanni
- Saffron-crested tyrant-manakin, Neopelma chrysocephalum
- Sulphur-bellied tyrant-manakin, Neopelma sulphureiventer
- Jet manakin, Chloropipo unicolor
- Blue-backed manakin, Chiroxiphia pareola
- Yungas manakin, Chiroxiphia boliviana
- Golden-winged manakin, Masius chrysopterus
- Black manakin, Xenopipo atronitens
- Green manakin, Cryptopipo holochlora
- Blue-capped manakin, Lepidothrix coronata
- Blue-rumped manakin, Lepidothrix isidorei
- Cerulean-capped manakin, Lepidothrix coeruleocapilla (E)
- Orange-crowned manakin, Heterocercus aurantiivertex
- Flame-crowned manakin, Heterocercus linteatus
- White-bearded manakin, Manacus manacus
- Wire-tailed manakin, Pipra filicauda
- Band-tailed manakin, Pipra fasciicauda
- Striolated manakin, Machaeropterus striolatus
- Painted manakin, Machaeropterus eckelberryi (E)
- Fiery-capped manakin, Machaeropterus pyrocephalus
- White-crowned manakin, Pseudopipra pipra
- Golden-headed manakin, Ceratopipra erythrocephala
- Red-headed manakin, Ceratopipra rubrocapilla
- Round-tailed manakin, Ceratopipra chloromeros

== Cotingas ==
Order: Passeriformes Family: Cotingidae

The cotingas are birds of forests or forest edges in tropical South America. Comparatively little is known about this diverse group, although all have broad bills with hooked tips, rounded wings, and strong legs. The males of many of the species are brightly colored or decorated with plumes or wattles. Thirty species have been recorded in Peru.

- Green-and-black fruiteater, Pipreola riefferii
- Band-tailed fruiteater, Pipreola intermedia
- Barred fruiteater, Pipreola arcuata
- Black-chested fruiteater, Pipreola lubomirskii
- Masked fruiteater, Pipreola pulchra (E)
- Scarlet-breasted fruiteater, Pipreola frontalis
- Fiery-throated fruiteater, Pipreola chlorolepidota
- Scaled fruiteater, Ampelioides tschudii
- White-cheeked cotinga, Zaratornis stresemanni (E)
- Peruvian plantcutter, Phytotoma raimondii (E)
- Bay-vented cotinga, Doliornis sclateri (E)
- Red-crested cotinga, Ampelion rubrocristatus
- Chestnut-crested cotinga, Ampelion rufaxilla
- Black-necked red-cotinga, Phoenicircus nigricollis
- Andean cock-of-the-rock, Rupicola peruvianus
- Gray-tailed piha, Snowornis subalaris
- Olivaceous piha, Snowornis cryptolophus
- Purple-throated fruitcrow, Querula purpurata
- Red-ruffed fruitcrow, Pyroderus scutatus
- Amazonian umbrellabird, Cephalopterus ornatus
- Plum-throated cotinga, Cotinga maynana
- Purple-breasted cotinga, Cotinga cotinga
- Spangled cotinga, Cotinga cayana
- Screaming piha, Lipaugus vociferans
- Dusky piha, Lipaugus fuscocinereus
- Scimitar-winged piha, Lipaugus uropygialis
- Purple-throated cotinga, Porphyrolaema porphyrolaema
- Pompadour cotinga, Xipholena punicea
- Bare-necked fruitcrow, Gymnoderus foetidus
- Black-faced cotinga, Conioptilon mcilhennyi

== Tityras ==
Order: Passeriformes Family: Tityridae

Tityridae are suboscine passerine birds found in forest and woodland in the Neotropics. The species in this family were formerly spread over the families Tyrannidae, Pipridae, and Cotingidae. They are small to medium-sized birds. They do not have the sophisticated vocal capabilities of the songbirds. Most, but not all, have plain coloring. Twenty-three species have been recorded in Peru.

- Black-crowned tityra, Tityra inquisitor
- Black-tailed tityra, Tityra cayana
- Masked tityra, Tityra semifasciata
- Varzea schiffornis, Schiffornis major
- Northern schiffornis, Schiffornis veraepacis
- Foothill schiffornis, Schiffornis aenea
- Brown-winged schiffornis, Schiffornis turdina
- Cinereous mourner, Laniocera hypopyrra
- White-browed purpletuft, Iodopleura isabellae
- Shrike-like cotinga, Laniisoma elegans
- White-naped xenopsaris, Xenopsaris albinucha (V)
- Green-backed becard, Pachyramphus viridis
- Barred becard, Pachyramphus versicolor
- Slaty becard, Pachyramphus spodiurus
- Cinereous becard, Pachyramphus rufus
- Chestnut-crowned becard, Pachyramphus castaneus
- Cryptic becard, Pachyramphus salvini
- White-winged becard, Pachyramphus polychopterus
- Black-and-white becard, Pachyramphus albogriseus
- Black-capped becard, Pachyramphus marginatus
- One-colored becard, Pachyramphus homochrous
- Pink-throated becard, Pachyramphus minor
- Crested becard, Pachyramphus validus

== Sharpbill ==
Order: Passeriformes Family: Oxyruncidae

The sharpbill is a small bird of dense forests in Central and South America. It feeds mostly on fruit but also eats insects.

- Sharpbill, Oxyruncus cristatus

== Royal flycatchers ==
Order: Passeriformes Family: Onychorhynchidae

In 2019 the SACC determined that these five species, which were formerly considered tyrant flycatchers, belonged in their own family.

- Tropical royal-flycatcher, Onychorhynchus coronatus
- Ruddy-tailed flycatcher, Terenotriccus erythrurus
- Tawny-breasted flycatcher, Myiobius villosus
- Sulphur-rumped flycatcher, Myiobius barbatus
- Black-tailed flycatcher, Myiobius atricaudus

== Tyrant flycatchers ==
Order: Passeriformes Family: Tyrannidae

Tyrant flycatchers are passerine birds which occur throughout North and South America. They superficially resemble the Old World flycatchers, but are more robust and have stronger bills. They do not have the sophisticated vocal capabilities of the songbirds. Most, but not all, have plain coloring. As the name implies, most are insectivorous. Peru has the largest number of tyrant flycatchers of any country and it is indeed the largest assemblage of a family in any country on earth. Two hundred sixty have been recorded there.

- Wing-barred piprites, Piprites chloris
- Cinnamon manakin-tyrant, Neopipo cinnamomea
- Cinnamon-crested spadebill, Platyrinchus saturatus
- White-throated spadebill, Platyrinchus mystaceus
- Golden-crowned spadebill, Platyrinchus coronatus
- Yellow-throated spadebill, Platyrinchus flavigularis
- White-crested spadebill, Platyrinchus platyrhynchos
- Bronze-olive pygmy-tyrant, Pseudotriccus pelzelni
- Hazel-fronted pygmy-tyrant, Pseudotriccus simplex
- Rufous-headed pygmy-tyrant, Pseudotriccus ruficeps
- Ringed antpipit, Corythopis torquatus
- Marble-faced bristle-tyrant, Pogonotriccus ophthalmicus
- Variegated bristle-tyrant, Pogonotriccus poecilotis
- Spectacled bristle-tyrant, Pogonotriccus orbitalis
- Mottle-cheeked tyrannulet, Phylloscartes ventralis
- Ecuadorian tyrannulet, Phylloscartes gualaquizae
- Rufous-browed tyrannulet, Phylloscartes superciliaris (U)
- Cinnamon-faced tyrannulet, Phylloscartes parkeri
- Streak-necked flycatcher, Mionectes striaticollis
- Olive-striped flycatcher, Mionectes olivaceus
- Ochre-bellied flycatcher, Mionectes oleagineus
- McConnell's flycatcher, Mionectes macconnelli
- Sepia-capped flycatcher, Leptopogon amaurocephalus
- Slaty-capped flycatcher, Leptopogon superciliaris
- Rufous-breasted flycatcher, Leptopogon rufipectus
- Inca flycatcher, Leptopogon taczanowskii (E)
- Brownish twistwing, Cnipodectes subbrunneus
- Rufous twistwing, Cnipodectes superrufus
- Olivaceous flatbill, Rhynchocyclus olivaceus
- Fulvous-breasted flatbill, Rhynchocyclus fulvipectus
- Orange-eyed flatbill, Tolmomyias traylori
- Yellow-margined flatbill, Tolmomyias assimilis
- Gray-crowned flycatcher, Tolmomyias poliocephalus
- Olive-faced flatbill, Tolmomyias viridiceps
- Yellow-olive flatbill, Tolmomyias sulphurescens
- White-bellied pygmy-tyrant, Myiornis albiventris
- Short-tailed pygmy-tyrant, Myiornis ecaudatus
- Scale-crested pygmy-tyrant, Lophotriccus pileatus
- Double-banded pygmy-tyrant, Lophotriccus vitiosus
- Long-crested pygmy-tyrant, Lophotriccus eulophotes
- Helmeted pygmy-tyrant, Lophotriccus galeatus
- Snethlage's tody-tyrant, Hemitriccus minor (U)
- Acre tody-tyrant, Hemitriccus cohnhafti
- Yungas tody-tyrant, Hemitriccus spodiops
- Flammulated pygmy-tyrant, Hemitriccus flammulatus
- White-eyed tody-tyrant, Hemitriccus zosterops
- White-bellied tody-tyrant, Hemitriccus griseipectus
- Johannes's tody-tyrant, Hemitriccus iohannis
- Stripe-necked tody-tyrant, Hemitriccus striaticollis
- Pearly-vented tody-tyrant, Hemitriccus margaritaceiventer
- Zimmer's tody-tyrant, Hemitriccus minimus
- Black-throated tody-tyrant, Hemitriccus granadensis
- Cinnamon-breasted tody-tyrant, Hemitriccus cinnamomeipectus
- Buff-throated tody-tyrant, Hemitriccus rufigularis
- Rufous-crowned tody-flycatcher, Poecilotriccus ruficeps
- Johnson's tody-flycatcher, Poecilotriccus luluae (E)
- White-cheeked tody-flycatcher, Poecilotriccus albifacies
- Black-and-white tody-flycatcher, Poecilotriccus capitalis
- Ochre-faced tody-flycatcher, Poecilotriccus plumbeiceps
- Rusty-fronted tody-flycatcher, Poecilotriccus latirostris
- Golden-winged tody-flycatcher, Poecilotriccus calopterus
- Black-backed tody-flycatcher, Poecilotriccus pulchellus (E)
- Spotted tody-flycatcher, Todirostrum maculatum
- Common tody-flycatcher, Todirostrum cinereum
- Yellow-browed tody-flycatcher, Todirostrum chrysocrotaphum
- Ornate flycatcher, Myiotriccus ornatus
- Handsome flycatcher, Nephelomyias pulcher
- Orange-banded flycatcher, Nephelomyias lintoni
- Ochraceous-breasted flycatcher, Nephelomyias ochraceiventris
- Cliff flycatcher, Hirundinea ferruginea
- Cinnamon flycatcher, Pyrrhomyias cinnamomeus
- Bolivian tyrannulet, Zimmerius bolivianus
- Red-billed tyrannulet, Zimmerius cinereicapilla
- Mishana tyrannulet, Zimmerius villarejoi (E)
- Slender-footed tyrannulet, Zimmerius gracilipes
- Golden-faced tyrannulet, Zimmerius chrysops
- Peruvian tyrannulet, Zimmerius viridiflavus
- Lesser wagtail-tyrant, Stigmatura napensis
- Plain tyrannulet, Inezia inornata
- Fulvous-crowned scrub-tyrant, Euscarthmus meloryphus
- Fulvous-faced scrub-tyrant, Euscarthmus fulviceps
- Yellow-bellied elaenia, Elaenia flavogaster
- Large elaenia, Elaenia spectabilis
- White-crested elaenia, Elaenia albiceps
- Small-billed elaenia, Elaenia parvirostris
- Slaty elaenia, Elaenia strepera
- Mottle-backed elaenia, Elaenia gigas
- Brownish elaenia, Elaenia pelzelni
- Plain-crested elaenia, Elaenia cristata
- Lesser elaenia, Elaenia chiriquensis
- Highland elaenia, Elaenia obscura
- Sierran elaenia, Elaenia pallatangae
- Yellow-crowned tyrannulet, Tyrannulus elatus
- Forest elaenia, Myiopagis gaimardii
- Gray elaenia, Myiopagis caniceps
- Foothill elaenia, Myiopagis olallai
- Pacific elaenia, Myiopagis subplacens
- Yellow-crowned elaenia, Myiopagis flavivertex
- Greenish elaenia, Myiopagis viridicata
- Yellow tyrannulet, Capsiempis flaveola
- White-tailed tyrannulet, Mecocerculus poecilocercus
- Buff-banded tyrannulet, Mecocerculus hellmayri
- White-banded tyrannulet, Mecocerculus stictopterus
- White-throated tyrannulet, Mecocerculus leucophrys
- Rufous-winged tyrannulet, Mecocerculus calopterus
- Sulphur-bellied tyrannulet, Mecocerculus minor
- Sclater's tyrannulet, Phyllomyias sclateri
- Yungas tyrannulet, Phyllomyias weedeni
- Sooty-headed tyrannulet, Phyllomyias griseiceps
- Plumbeous-crowned tyrannulet, Phyllomyias plumbeiceps
- White-fronted tyrannulet, Acrochordopus zeledoni
- Ashy-headed tyrannulet, Tyranniscus cinereiceps
- Black-capped tyrannulet, Tyranniscus nigrocapillus
- Tawny-rumped tyrannulet, Tyranniscus uropygialis
- Pacific beardless-tyrannulet, Camptostoma sclateri
- Amazonian beardless-tyrannulet, Camptostoma napaeum
- White-lored tyrannulet, Ornithion inerme
- Mouse-colored tyrannulet, Nesotriccus murinus
- Tumbesian tyrannulet, Nesotriccus tumbezanus
- Marañon tyrannulet, Nesotriccus maranonicus
- Gray-and-white tyrannulet, Pseudelaenia leucospodia
- Black-crested tit-tyrant, Anairetes nigrocristatus
- Pied-crested tit-tyrant, Anairetes reguloides
- Ash-breasted tit-tyrant, Anairetes alpinus
- Yellow-billed tit-tyrant, Anairetes flavirostris
- Tufted tit-tyrant, Anairetes parulus
- Subtropical doradito, Pseudocolopteryx acutipennis
- Torrent tyrannulet, Serpophaga cinerea
- River tyrannulet, Serpophaga hypoleuca
- White-crested tyrannulet, Serpophaga subcristata (V)
- Straneck's tyrannulet, Serpophaga griseicapilla (V)
- Unstreaked tit-tyrant, Uromyias agraphia (E)
- Short-tailed field tyrant, Muscigralla brevicauda
- Cinnamon attila, Attila cinnamomeus
- Ochraceous attila, Attila torridus
- Citron-bellied attila, Attila citriniventris
- Dull-capped attila, Attila bolivianus
- Bright-rumped attila, Attila spadiceus
- Piratic flycatcher, Legatus leucophaius
- Large-headed flatbill, Ramphotrigon megacephalum
- Rufous-tailed flatbill, Ramphotrigon ruficauda
- Dusky-tailed flatbill, Ramphotrigon fuscicauda
- Great kiskadee, Pitangus sulphuratus
- Lesser kiskadee, Philohydor lictor
- Cattle tyrant, Machetornis rixosa (V)
- Sulphury flycatcher, Tyrannopsis sulphurea
- Boat-billed flycatcher, Megarynchus pitangua
- Golden-bellied flycatcher, Myiodynastes hemichrysus
- Golden-crowned flycatcher, Myiodynastes chrysocephalus
- Baird's flycatcher, Myiodynastes bairdii
- Sulphur-bellied flycatcher, Myiodynastes luteiventris
- Streaked flycatcher, Myiodynastes maculatus
- Rusty-margined flycatcher, Myiozetetes cayanensis
- Social flycatcher, Myiozetetes similis
- Gray-capped flycatcher, Myiozetetes granadensis
- Dusky-chested flycatcher, Myiozetetes luteiventris
- Yellow-throated flycatcher, Conopias parvus
- Three-striped flycatcher, Conopias trivirgatus
- Lemon-browed flycatcher, Conopias cinchoneti
- Variegated flycatcher, Empidonomus varius
- Crowned slaty flycatcher, Empidonomus aurantioatrocristatus
- Snowy-throated kingbird, Tyrannus niveigularis
- White-throated kingbird, Tyrannus albogularis
- Tropical kingbird, Tyrannus melancholicus
- Scissor-tailed flycatcher, Tyrannus forficatus (V)
- Fork-tailed flycatcher, Tyrannus savana
- Eastern kingbird, Tyrannus tyrannus
- Grayish mourner, Rhytipterna simplex
- Rufous casiornis, Casiornis rufus
- White-rumped sirystes, Sirystes albocinereus
- Rufous flycatcher, Myiarchus semirufus (E)
- Dusky-capped flycatcher, Myiarchus tuberculifer
- Swainson's flycatcher, Myiarchus swainsoni
- Short-crested flycatcher, Myiarchus ferox
- Sooty-crowned flycatcher, Myiarchus phaeocephalus
- Pale-edged flycatcher, Myiarchus cephalotes
- Great crested flycatcher, Myiarchus crinitus (V)
- Brown-crested flycatcher, Myiarchus tyrannulus
- Long-tailed tyrant, Colonia colonus
- Flavescent flycatcher, Myiophobus flavicans
- Orange-crested flycatcher, Myiophobus phoenicomitra
- Unadorned flycatcher, Myiophobus inornatus
- Roraiman flycatcher, Myiophobus roraimae
- Olive-chested flycatcher, Myiophobus cryptoxanthus
- Bran-colored flycatcher, Myiophobus fasciatus
- Mouse-gray flycatcher, Myiophobus crypterythrus
- Rufescent flycatcher, Myiophobus rufescens
- Crowned chat-tyrant, Silvicultrix frontalis
- Yellow-bellied chat-tyrant, Silvicultrix diadema
- Jelski's chat-tyrant, Silvicultrix jelskii
- Golden-browed chat-tyrant, Silvicultrix pulchella
- Slaty-backed chat-tyrant, Ochthoeca cinnamomeiventris
- Rufous-breasted chat-tyrant, Ochthoeca rufipectoralis
- Brown-backed chat-tyrant, Ochthoeca fumicolor
- d'Orbigny's chat-tyrant, Ochthoeca oenanthoides
- Piura chat-tyrant, Ochthoeca piurae (E)
- White-browed chat-tyrant, Ochthoeca leucophrys
- Tumbes tyrant, Tumbezia salvini
- Amazonian scrub-flycatcher, Sublegatus obscurior
- Southern scrub-flycatcher, Sublegatus modestus
- Vermilion flycatcher, Pyrocephalus rubinus
- Pied water tyrant, Fluvicola pica
- Black-backed water tyrant, Fluvicola albiventer
- Masked water tyrant, Fluvicola nengeta
- White-headed marsh tyrant, Arundinicola leucocephala
- Austral negrito, Lessonia rufa (V)
- Andean negrito, Lessonia oreas
- Spectacled tyrant, Hymenops perspicillatus (V)
- Riverside tyrant, Knipolegus orenocensis
- Rufous-tailed tyrant, Knipolegus poecilurus
- Amazonian black-tyrant, Knipolegus poecilocercus
- Jelski's black-tyrant, Knipolegus signatus
- Plumbeous black-tyrant, Knipolegus cabanisi
- White-winged black-tyrant, Knipolegus aterrimus
- Hudson's black-tyrant, Knipolegus hudsoni (V)
- Yellow-browed tyrant, Satrapa icterophrys
- Little ground-tyrant, Muscisaxicola fluviatilis
- Spot-billed ground-tyrant, Muscisaxicola maculirostris
- Taczanowski's ground-tyrant, Muscisaxicola griseus
- Puna ground-tyrant, Muscisaxicola juninensis
- Cinereous ground-tyrant, Muscisaxicola cinereus
- White-fronted ground-tyrant, Muscisaxicola albifrons
- Ochre-naped ground-tyrant, Muscisaxicola flavinucha
- Rufous-naped ground-tyrant, Muscisaxicola rufivertex
- Dark-faced ground-tyrant, Muscisaxicola maclovianus
- White-browed ground-tyrant, Muscisaxicola albilora
- Plain-capped ground-tyrant, Muscisaxicola alpinus (U)
- Cinnamon-bellied ground-tyrant, Muscisaxicola capistratus
- Black-fronted ground-tyrant, Muscisaxicola frontalis
- Red-rumped bush-tyrant, Cnemarchus erythropygius
- Rufous-webbed bush-tyrant, Cnemarchus rufipennis
- Gray monjita, Nengetus cinereus
- Black-billed shrike-tyrant, Agriornis montanus
- White-tailed shrike-tyrant, Agriornis albicauda
- Gray-bellied shrike-tyrant, Agriornis micropterus
- Streak-throated bush-tyrant, Myiotheretes striaticollis
- Smoky bush-tyrant, Myiotheretes fumigatus
- Rufous-bellied bush-tyrant, Myiotheretes fuscorufus
- Drab water tyrant, Ochthornis littoralis
- Fuscous flycatcher, Cnemotriccus fuscatus
- Euler's flycatcher, Lathrotriccus euleri
- Gray-breasted flycatcher, Lathrotriccus griseipectus
- Olive flycatcher, Mitrephanes olivaceus
- Black phoebe, Sayornis nigricans
- Alder flycatcher, Empidonax alnorum
- Olive-sided flycatcher, Contopus cooperi
- Smoke-colored pewee, Contopus fumigatus
- Western wood-pewee, Contopus sordidulus
- Eastern wood-pewee, Contopus virens
- Tropical pewee, Contopus cinereus
- Blackish pewee, Contopus nigrescens
- Many-colored rush tyrant, Tachuris rubrigastra

== Vireos ==
Order: Passeriformes Family: Vireonidae

The vireos are a group of small to medium-sized passerine birds. They are typically greenish in color and resemble wood warblers apart from their heavier bills. Fourteen species have been recorded in Peru.

- Rufous-browed peppershrike, Cyclarhis gujanensis
- Olivaceous greenlet, Hylophilus olivaceus
- Ashy-headed greenlet, Hylophilus pectoralis
- Gray-chested greenlet, Hylophilus semicinereus
- Lemon-chested greenlet, Hylophilus thoracicus
- Slaty-capped shrike-vireo, Vireolanius leucotis
- Rufous-fronted brownlet, Tunchiornis ferrugineifrons
- Lesser greenlet, Pachysylvia decurtata
- Dusky-capped greenlet, Pachysylvia hypoxantha
- Brown-capped vireo, Vireo leucophrys
- Red-eyed vireo, Vireo olivaceus
- Chivi vireo, Vireo chivi
- Yellow-green vireo, Vireo flavoviridis
- Black-whiskered vireo, Vireo altiloquus (V)

== Jays ==
Order: Passeriformes Family: Corvidae

The family Corvidae includes crows, ravens, jays, choughs, magpies, treepies, nutcrackers, and ground jays. Corvids are above average in size among the Passeriformes, and some of the larger species show high levels of intelligence. Six species have been recorded in Peru.

- White-collared jay, Cyanolyca viridicyana
- Turquoise jay, Cyanolyca turcosa
- Violaceous jay, Cyanocorax violaceus
- Purplish jay, Cyanocorax cyanomelas
- White-tailed jay, Cyanocorax mystacalis
- Green jay, Cyanocorax yncas

== Swallows ==
Order: Passeriformes Family: Hirundinidae

The family Hirundinidae is adapted to aerial feeding. They have a slender streamlined body, long pointed wings, and a short bill with a wide gape. The feet are adapted to perching rather than walking, and the front toes are partially joined at the base. Twenty-one species have been recorded in Peru.

- Blue-and-white swallow, Pygochelidon cyanoleuca
- Tawny-headed swallow, Alopochelidon fucata (V)
- Brown-bellied swallow, Orochelidon murina
- Pale-footed swallow, Orochelidon flavipes
- Andean swallow, Orochelidon andecola
- White-banded swallow, Atticora fasciata
- White-thighed swallow, Atticora tibialis
- Southern rough-winged swallow, Stelgidopteryx ruficollis
- Brown-chested martin, Progne tapera
- Purple martin, Progne subis
- Gray-breasted martin, Progne chalybea
- Southern martin, Progne elegans
- Peruvian martin, Progne murphyi
- Tumbes swallow, Tachycineta stolzmanni
- White-winged swallow, Tachycineta albiventer
- White-rumped swallow, Tachycineta leucorrhoa
- Chilean swallow, Tachycineta leucopyga (U)
- Bank swallow, Riparia riparia
- Barn swallow, Hirundo rustica
- Cliff swallow, Petrochelidon pyrrhonota
- Chestnut-collared swallow, Petrochelidon rufocollaris

== Wrens ==
Order: Passeriformes Family: Troglodytidae

The wrens are mainly small and inconspicuous except for their loud songs. These birds have short wings and thin down-turned bills. Several species often hold their tails upright. All are insectivorous. Twenty-four species have been recorded in Peru.

- Scaly-breasted wren, Microcerculus marginatus
- Wing-banded wren, Microcerculus bambla
- Gray-mantled wren, Odontorchilus branickii
- Southern house-wren, Troglodytes musculus
- Mountain wren, Troglodytes solstitialis
- Grass wren, Cistothorus platensis
- Fasciated wren, Campylorhynchus fasciatus
- Thrush-like wren, Campylorhynchus turdinus
- Plain-tailed wren, Pheugopedius euophrys
- Inca wren, Pheugopedius eisenmanni (E)
- Moustached wren, Pheugopedius genibarbis
- Coraya wren, Pheugopedius coraya
- Speckle-breasted wren, Pheugopedius sclateri
- Superciliated wren, Cantorchilus superciliaris
- Buff-breasted wren, Cantorchilus leucotis
- Rufous wren, Cinnycerthia unirufa
- Sharpe's wren, Cinnycerthia olivascens
- Peruvian wren, Cinnycerthia peruana (E)
- Fulvous wren, Cinnycerthia fulva
- White-breasted wood-wren, Henicorhina leucosticta
- Bar-winged wood-wren, Henicorhina leucoptera
- Gray-breasted wood-wren, Henicorhina leucophrys
- Chestnut-breasted wren, Cyphorhinus thoracicus
- Musician wren, Cyphorhinus arada

== Gnatcatchers ==
Order: Passeriformes Family: Polioptilidae

These dainty birds resemble Old World warblers in their build and habits, moving restlessly through the foliage seeking insects. The gnatcatchers and gnatwrens are mainly soft bluish gray in color and have the typical insectivore's long sharp bill. They are birds of fairly open woodland or scrub, which nest in bushes or trees. Six species have been recorded in Peru.

- Collared gnatwren, Microbates collaris
- Half-collared gnatwren, Microbates cinereiventris
- Trilling gnatwren, Ramphocaenus melanurus
- Chattering gnatwren, Ramphocaenus sticturus
- Tropical gnatcatcher, Polioptila plumbea
- Iquitos gnatcatcher, Polioptila clementsi (E)

== Donacobius ==
Order: Passeriformes Family: Donacobiidae

The black-capped donacobius is found in wet habitats from Panama across northern South America and east of the Andes to Argentina and Paraguay.

- Black-capped donacobius, Donacobius atricapilla

== Dippers ==
Order: Passeriformes Family: Cinclidae

Dippers are a group of perching birds whose habitat includes aquatic environments in the Americas, Europe and Asia. They are named for their bobbing or dipping movements. One species has been recorded in Peru.

- White-capped dipper, Cinclus leucocephalus

== Thrushes ==
Order: Passeriformes Family: Turdidae

The thrushes are a group of passerine birds that occur mainly in the Old World. They are plump, soft plumaged, small to medium-sized insectivores or sometimes omnivores, often feeding on the ground. Many have attractive songs. Twenty-five species have been recorded in Peru.

- Andean solitaire, Myadestes ralloides
- Slaty-backed nightingale-thrush, Catharus fuscater
- Speckled nightingale-thrush, Catharus maculatus
- Veery, Catharus fuscescens (V)
- Gray-cheeked thrush, Catharus minimus
- Swainson's thrush, Catharus ustulatus
- White-eared solitaire, Entomodestes leucotis
- Rufous-brown solitaire, Cichlopsis leucogenys
- Pale-eyed thrush, Turdus leucops
- Plumbeous-backed thrush, Turdus reevei
- Pale-breasted thrush, Turdus leucomelas
- Hauxwell's thrush, Turdus hauxwelli
- Pale-vented thrush, Turdus obsoletus (U)
- Ecuadorian thrush, Turdus maculirostris
- Varzea thrush, Turdus sanchezorum
- Lawrence's thrush, Turdus lawrencii
- Creamy-bellied thrush, Turdus amaurochalinus
- Black-billed thrush, Turdus ignobilis
- Marañon thrush, Turdus maranonicus
- Chestnut-bellied thrush, Turdus fulviventris
- Andean slaty thrush, Turdus nigriceps
- Great thrush, Turdus fuscater
- Chiguanco thrush, Turdus chiguanco
- Glossy-black thrush, Turdus serranus
- Gray-flanked thrush, Turdus phaeopygus

== Mockingbirds ==
Order: Passeriformes Family: Mimidae

The mimids are a family of passerine birds that includes thrashers, mockingbirds, tremblers, and the New World catbirds. These birds are notable for their vocalizations, especially their ability to mimic a wide variety of birds and other sounds heard outdoors. Their coloring tends towards dull-grays and browns. Four species have been recorded in Peru.

- Tropical mockingbird, Mimus gilvus (V)
- Long-tailed mockingbird, Mimus longicaudatus
- White-banded mockingbird, Mimus triurus (V)
- Brown-backed mockingbird, Mimus dorsalis (V)

== Old World sparrows ==
Order: Passeriformes Family: Passeridae

Sparrows are small passerine birds. In general, sparrows tend to be small, plump, brown or gray birds with short tails and short powerful beaks. Sparrows are seed eaters, but they also consume small insects. One species has been recorded in Peru.

- House sparrow, Passer domesticus (I)

== Pipits and wagtails ==
Order: Passeriformes Family: Motacillidae

Motacillidae is a family of small passerine birds with medium to long tails. They include the wagtails, longclaws, and pipits. They are slender ground-feeding insectivores of open country. Six species have been recorded in Peru.

- Yellowish pipit, Anthus chii
- Short-billed pipit, Anthus furcatus
- Peruvian pipit, Anthus peruvianus
- Correndera pipit, Anthus correndera
- Hellmayr's pipit, Anthus hellmayri
- Paramo pipit, Anthus bogotensis

== Finches ==
Order: Passeriformes Family: Fringillidae

Finches are seed-eating passerine birds, that are small to moderately large and have a strong beak, usually conical and in some species very large. All have twelve tail feathers and nine primaries. These birds have a bouncing flight with alternating bouts of flapping and gliding on closed wings, and most sing well. Twenty species have been recorded in Peru.

- Thick-billed siskin, Spinus crassirostris
- Hooded siskin, Spinus magellanicus
- Saffron siskin, Spinus siemiradzkii
- Olivaceous siskin, Spinus olivaceus
- Yellow-bellied siskin, Spinus xanthogastrus
- Black siskin, Spinus atratus
- Yellow-rumped siskin, Spinus uropygialis
- Lesser goldfinch, Spinus psaltria
- Golden-rumped euphonia, Chlorophonia cyanocephala
- Blue-naped chlorophonia, Chlorophonia cyanea
- Chestnut-breasted chlorophonia, Chlorophonia pyrrhophrys
- Orange-crowned euphonia, Euphonia saturata
- Plumbeous euphonia, Euphonia plumbea
- Purple-throated euphonia, Euphonia chlorotica
- Golden-bellied euphonia, Euphonia chrysopasta
- White-vented euphonia, Euphonia minuta
- Orange-bellied euphonia, Euphonia xanthogaster
- Thick-billed euphonia, Euphonia laniirostris
- Bronze-green euphonia, Euphonia mesochrysa
- Rufous-bellied euphonia, Euphonia rufiventris

== Sparrows ==
Order: Passeriformes Family: Passerellidae

Most of the species are known as sparrows, but these birds are not closely related to the Old World sparrows which are in the family Passeridae. Many of these have distinctive head patterns. Thirty species have been recorded in Peru.

- Yellow-throated chlorospingus, Chlorospingus flavigularis
- Short-billed chlorospingus, Chlorospingus parvirostris
- Ashy-throated chlorospingus, Chlorospingus canigularis
- Common chlorospingus, Chlorospingus flavopectus
- Tumbes sparrow, Aimophila stolzmanni
- Grassland sparrow, Ammodramus humeralis
- Yellow-browed sparrow, Ammodramus aurifrons
- Black-striped sparrow, Arremonops conirostris (U)
- Gray-browed brushfinch, Arremon assimilis
- White-browed brushfinch, Arremon torquatus
- Orange-billed sparrow, Arremon aurantiirostris
- Black-capped sparrow, Arremon abeillei
- Pectoral sparrow, Arremon taciturnus
- Chestnut-capped brushfinch, Arremon brunneinucha
- Olive finch, Arremon castaneiceps
- Rufous-collared sparrow, Zonotrichia capensis
- White-headed brushfinch, Atlapetes albiceps
- Rufous-eared brushfinch, Atlapetes rufigenis (E)
- Tricolored brushfinch, Atlapetes tricolor
- Slaty brushfinch, Atlapetes schistaceus
- Pale-naped brushfinch, Atlapetes pallidinucha
- Yellow-breasted brushfinch, Atlapetes latinuchus
- White-winged brushfinch, Atlapetes leucopterus
- Bay-crowned brushfinch, Atlapetes seebohmi
- Rusty-bellied brushfinch, Atlapetes nationi (E)
- Apurimac brushfinch, Atlapetes forbesi (E)
- Black-spectacled brushfinch, Atlapetes melanopsis (E)
- Vilcabamba brushfinch, Atlapetes terborghi (E)
- Cuzco brushfinch, Atlapetes canigenis (E)
- Black-faced brushfinch, Atlapetes melanolaemus

== Blackbirds ==
Order: Passeriformes Family: Icteridae

The icterids are a group of small to medium-sized, often colorful, passerine birds restricted to the New World and include the grackles, New World blackbirds and New World orioles. Most species have black as the predominant plumage color, often enlivened by yellow, orange, or red. Thirty-four species have been recorded in Peru.

- Bobolink, Dolichonyx oryzivorus
- Red-breasted meadowlark, Leistes militaris
- White-browed meadowlark, Leistes superciliaris
- Peruvian meadowlark, Leistes bellicosus
- Yellow-billed cacique, Amblycercus holosericeus
- Russet-backed oropendola, Psarocolius angustifrons
- Dusky-green oropendola, Psarocolius atrovirens
- Green oropendola, Psarocolius viridis
- Crested oropendola, Psarocolius decumanus
- Olive oropendola, Psarocolius bifasciatus
- Solitary black cacique, Cacicus solitarius
- Ecuadorian cacique, Cacicus sclateri
- Selva cacique, Cacicus koepckeae (E)
- Scarlet-rumped cacique, Cacicus uropygialis
- Yellow-rumped cacique, Cacicus cela
- Mountain cacique, Cacicus chrysonotus
- Band-tailed cacique, Cacicus latirostris
- Red-rumped cacique, Cacicus haemorrhous
- Casqued cacique, Cacicus oseryi
- Orange-backed troupial, Icterus croconotus
- White-edged oriole, Icterus graceannae
- Yellow-tailed oriole, Icterus mesomelas
- Epaulet oriole, Icterus cayanensis
- Giant cowbird, Molothrus oryzivorus
- Shiny cowbird, Molothrus bonariensis
- Scrub blackbird, Dives warczewiczi
- Great-tailed grackle, Quiscalus mexicanus
- Velvet-fronted grackle, Lampropsar tanagrinus
- Oriole blackbird, Gymnomystax mexicanus
- Chopi blackbird, Gnorimopsar chopi
- Pale-eyed blackbird, Agelasticus xanthophthalmus
- Unicolored blackbird, Agelasticus cyanopus (V)
- Yellow-winged blackbird, Agelasticus thilius
- Yellow-hooded blackbird, Chrysomus icterocephalus

== Wood-warblers ==
Order: Passeriformes Family: Parulidae

The wood-warblers are a group of small, often colorful, passerine birds restricted to the New World. Most are arboreal, but some are terrestrial. Most members of this family are insectivores. Twenty-six species have been recorded in Peru.

- Northern waterthrush, Parkesia noveboracensis
- Golden-winged warbler, Vermivora chrysoptera (U)
- Black-and-white warbler, Mniotilta varia (V)
- Tennessee warbler, Leiothlypis peregrina (V)
- Connecticut warbler, Oporornis agilis
- Masked yellowthroat, Geothlypis aequinoctialis
- American redstart, Setophaga ruticilla
- Cerulean warbler, Setophaga cerulea
- Tropical parula, Setophaga pitiayumi
- Blackburnian warbler, Setophaga fusca
- Yellow warbler, Setophaga petechia
- Blackpoll warbler, Setophaga striata
- Palm warbler, Setophaga palmarum (V)
- Citrine warbler, Myiothlypis luteoviridis
- Black-crested warbler, Myiothlypis nigrocristata
- Pale-legged warbler, Myiothlypis signata
- Buff-rumped warbler, Myiothlypis fulvicauda
- Two-banded warbler, Myiothlypis bivittata
- Golden-bellied warbler, Myiothlypis chrysogaster
- Gray-and-gold warbler, Myiothlypis fraseri
- Russet-crowned warbler, Myiothlypis coronata
- Three-striped warbler, Basileuterus tristriatus
- Three-banded warbler, Basileuterus trifasciatus
- Canada warbler, Cardellina canadensis
- Slate-throated whitestart, Myioborus miniatus
- Spectacled whitestart, Myioborus melanocephalus

== Mitrospingids ==
Order: Passeriformes Family: Mitrospingidae

Until 2017 the four species in this family were included in the family Thraupidae, the "true" tanagers.

- Red-billed pied tanager, Lamprospiza melanoleuca

== Cardinal grosbeaks ==
Order: Passeriformes Family: Cardinalidae

The cardinals are a family of robust, seed-eating birds with strong bills. They are typically associated with open woodland. The sexes usually have distinct plumages. Thirteen species have been recorded in Peru.

- Hepatic tanager, Piranga flava
- Summer tanager, Piranga rubra
- Scarlet tanager, Piranga olivacea
- Red-hooded tanager, Piranga rubriceps
- White-winged tanager, Piranga leucoptera
- Red-crowned ant-tanager, Habia rubica
- Yellow-lored tanager, Chlorothraupis frenata
- Golden grosbeak, Pheucticus chrysogaster
- Black-backed grosbeak, Pheucticus aureoventris
- Rose-breasted grosbeak, Pheucticus ludovicianus (V)
- Ecuadorian seedeater, Amaurospiza aequatorialis
- Blue-black grosbeak, Cyanoloxia cyanoides
- Amazonian grosbeak, Cyanoloxia rothschildii

== Tanagers ==
Order: Passeriformes Family: Thraupidae

The tanagers are a large group of small to medium-sized passerine birds restricted to the New World, mainly in the tropics. Many species are brightly colored. As a family they are omnivorous, but individual species specialize in eating fruits, seeds, insects, or other types of food. Most have short, rounded wings. One hundred ninety-three species have been recorded in Peru.

- Hooded tanager, Nemosia pileata
- White-capped tanager, Sericossypha albocristata
- Yellow-shouldered grosbeak, Parkerthraustes humeralis
- Plushcap, Catamblyrhynchus diadema
- Green honeycreeper, Chlorophanes spiza
- Golden-collared honeycreeper, Iridophanes pulcherrimus
- Guira tanager, Hemithraupis guira
- Yellow-backed tanager, Hemithraupis flavicollis
- Bicolored conebill, Conirostrum bicolor
- Pearly-breasted conebill, Conirostrum margaritae
- Chestnut-vented conebill, Conirostrum speciosum
- Giant conebill, Conirostrum binghami
- White-browed conebill, Conirostrum ferrugineiventre
- Blue-backed conebill, Conirostrum sitticolor
- Capped conebill, Conirostrum albifrons
- Tamarugo conebill, Conirostrum tamarugense
- Cinereous conebill, Conirostrum cinereum
- Stripe-tailed yellow-finch, Sicalis citrina
- Puna yellow-finch, Sicalis lutea
- Bright-rumped yellow-finch, Sicalis uropygialis
- Greenish yellow-finch, Sicalis olivascens
- Saffron finch, Sicalis flaveola
- Grassland yellow-finch, Sicalis luteola
- Raimondi's yellow-finch, Sicalis raimondii
- Sulphur-throated finch, Sicalis taczanowskii
- Black-hooded sierra finch, Phrygilus atriceps
- Peruvian sierra finch, Phrygilus punensis
- Plumbeous sierra finch, Geospizopsis unicolor
- Ash-breasted sierra finch, Geospizopsis plebejus
- Mourning sierra finch, Rhopospina fruticeti
- Band-tailed sierra finch, Rhopospina alaudina
- White-throated sierra finch, Idiopsar erythronotus
- Glacier finch, Idiopsar speculifer
- Boulder finch, Idiopsar brachyurus
- Band-tailed seedeater, Catamenia analis
- Plain-colored seedeater, Catamenia inornata
- Paramo seedeater, Catamenia homochroa
- Glossy flowerpiercer, Diglossa lafresnayii
- Moustached flowerpiercer, Diglossa mystacalis
- Black flowerpiercer, Diglossa humeralis
- Black-throated flowerpiercer, Diglossa brunneiventris
- White-sided flowerpiercer, Diglossa albilatera
- Rusty flowerpiercer, Diglossa sittoides
- Deep-blue flowerpiercer, Diglossa glauca
- Bluish flowerpiercer, Diglossa caerulescens
- Warbling masked-flowerpiercer, Diglossa cyanea
- Whistling masked-flowerpiercer, Diglossa melanopis
- Tit-like dacnis, Xenodacnis parina
- Slaty finch, Haplospiza rustica
- Blue-black grassquit, Volatinia jacarina
- Black-and-white tanager, Conothraupis speculigera
- Rufous-crested tanager, Creurgops verticalis
- Slaty tanager, Creurgops dentatus
- Flame-crested tanager, Loriotus cristatus
- Yellow-crested tanager, Loriotus rufiventer
- White-shouldered tanager, Loriotus luctuosus
- Fulvous-crested tanager, Tachyphonus surinamus
- White-lined tanager, Tachyphonus rufus
- Red-shouldered tanager, Tachyphonus phoenicius
- Gray-headed tanager, Eucometis penicillata
- Black-goggled tanager, Trichothraupis melanops
- Inti tanager, Heliothraupis oneilli
- Red-crested finch, Coryphospingus cucullatus
- Masked crimson tanager, Ramphocelus nigrogularis
- Black-bellied tanager, Ramphocelus melanogaster (E)
- Silver-beaked tanager, Ramphocelus carbo
- Flame-rumped tanager, Ramphocelus flammigerus
- Fulvous shrike-tanager, Lanio fulvus
- White-winged shrike-tanager, Lanio versicolor
- Crimson-breasted finch, Rhodospingus cruentus
- Short-billed honeycreeper, Cyanerpes nitidus
- Purple honeycreeper, Cyanerpes caeruleus
- Red-legged honeycreeper, Cyanerpes cyaneus
- Swallow tanager, Tersina viridis
- White-bellied dacnis, Dacnis albiventris
- Yellow-tufted dacnis, Dacnis egregia (V)
- Black-faced dacnis, Dacnis lineata
- Yellow-bellied dacnis, Dacnis flaviventer
- Blue dacnis, Dacnis cayana
- Lesson's seedeater, Sporophila bouvronides
- Lined seedeater, Sporophila lineola
- White-bellied seedeater, Sporophila leucoptera (V)
- Parrot-billed seedeater, Sporophila peruviana
- Chestnut-throated seedeater, Sporophila telasco
- Drab seedeater, Sporophila simplex
- Thick-billed seed-finch, Sporophila funerea (V)
- Chestnut-bellied seedeater, Sporophila castaneiventris
- Tawny-bellied seedeater, Sporophila hypoxantha (V)
- Dark-throated seedeater, Sporophila ruficollis (V)
- Chestnut-bellied seed-finch, Sporophila angolensis
- Large-billed seed-finch, Sporophila crassirostris
- Black-billed seed-finch, Sporophila atrirostris
- Variable seedeater, Sporophila corvina
- Wing-barred seedeater, Sporophila americana
- Black-and-white seedeater, Sporophila luctuosa
- Yellow-bellied seedeater, Sporophila nigricollis
- Double-collared seedeater, Sporophila caerulescens
- Slate-colored seedeater, Sporophila schistacea
- Plumbeous seedeater, Sporophila plumbea
- Buff-throated saltator, Saltator maximus
- Bluish-gray saltator, Saltator coerulescens
- Streaked saltator, Saltator striatipectus
- Black-cowled saltator, Saltator nigriceps
- Golden-billed saltator, Saltator aurantiirostris
- Masked saltator, Saltator cinctus
- Slate-colored grosbeak, Saltator grossus
- Black-masked finch, Coryphaspiza melanotis
- Wedge-tailed grass-finch, Emberizoides herbicola
- Cinereous finch, Piezorina cinerea (E)
- Slender-billed finch, Xenospingus concolor
- Black-headed hemispingus, Pseudospingus verticalis
- Drab hemispingus, Pseudospingus xanthophthalmus
- Pink-billed cnemoscopus, Cnemoscopus rubrirostris
- Black-billed cnemoscopus, Cnemoscopus chrysogaster (E)
- Rufous-browed hemispingus, Poospiza rufosuperciliaris (E)
- Rufous-breasted warbling finch, Poospiza rubecula (E)
- Collared warbling finch, Poospiza hispaniolensis
- Chestnut-breasted mountain finch, Poospizopsis caesar (E)
- Black-capped hemispingus, Kleinothraupis atropileus
- Parodi's hemispingus, Kleinothraupis parodii (E)
- Orange-browed hemispingus, Kleinothraupis calophrys
- Oleaginous hemispingus, Sphenopsis frontalis
- Black-eared hemispingus, Sphenopsis melanotis
- Orange-headed tanager, Thlypopsis sordida
- Buff-bellied tanager, Thlypopsis inornata
- Rust-and-yellow tanager, Thlypopsis ruficeps
- Superciliaried hemispingus, Thlypopsis superciliaris
- Rufous-chested tanager, Thlypopsis ornata
- Brown-flanked tanager, Thlypopsis pectoralis (E)
- Plain-tailed warbling finch, Microspingus alticola (E)
- Three-striped hemispingus, Microspingus trifasciatus
- Pardusco, Nephelornis oneilli (E)
- Great Inca-finch, Incaspiza pulchra (E)
- Rufous-backed Inca-finch, Incaspiza personata (E)
- Gray-winged Inca-finch, Incaspiza ortizi (E)
- Buff-bridled Inca-finch, Incaspiza laeta (E)
- Little Inca-finch, Incaspiza watkinsi (E)
- Bananaquit, Coereba flaveola
- Dull-colored grassquit, Asemospiza obscura
- Orange-eared tanager, Chlorochrysa calliparaea
- Red-crested cardinal, Paroaria coronata (I)
- Red-capped cardinal, Paroaria gularis
- Black-faced tanager, Schistochlamys melanopis
- Magpie tanager, Cissopis leverianus
- Vermilion tanager, Calochaetes coccineus
- Yellow-throated tanager, Iridosornis analis
- Golden-collared tanager, Iridosornis jelskii
- Golden-crowned tanager, Iridosornis rufivertex
- Yellow-scarfed tanager, Iridosornis reinhardti (E)
- Fawn-breasted tanager, Pipraeidea melanonota
- Blue-and-yellow tanager, Rauenia bonariensis
- Buff-banded mountain tanager, Dubusia taeniata
- Streak-crowned mountain tanager, Dubusia stictocehala (E)
- Chestnut-bellied mountain tanager, Dubusia castaneoventris
- Lacrimose mountain tanager, Anisognathus lacrymosus
- Scarlet-bellied mountain tanager, Anisognathus igniventris
- Blue-winged mountain tanager, Anisognathus somptuosus
- Hooded mountain tanager, Buthraupis montana
- Masked mountain tanager, Tephrophilus wetmorei
- Blue-capped tanager, Sporathraupis cyanocephala
- Grass-green tanager, Chlorornis riefferii
- Black-chested mountain tanager, Cnemathraupis eximia
- Golden-backed mountain tanager, Cnemathraupis aureodorsalis (E)
- Orange-throated tanager, Wetmorethraupis sterrhopteron
- Golden-naped tanager, Chalcothraupis ruficervix
- Silvery tanager, Stilpnia viridicollis
- Green-throated tanager, Stilpnia argyrofenges
- Sira tanager, Stilpnia phillipsi (E)
- Green-capped tanager, Stilpnia meyerdeschauenseei
- Burnished-buff tanager, Stilpnia cayana
- Masked tanager, Stilpnia nigrocincta
- Blue-necked tanager, Stilpnia cyanicollis
- Blue-and-black tanager, Tangara vassorii
- Beryl-spangled tanager, Tangara nigroviridis
- Metallic-green tanager, Tangara labradorides
- Blue-browed tanager, Tangara cyanotis
- Turquoise tanager, Tangara mexicana
- Paradise tanager, Tangara chilensis
- Opal-rumped tanager, Tangara velia
- Opal-crowned tanager, Tangara callophrys
- Bay-headed tanager, Tangara gyrola
- Golden-eared tanager, Tangara chrysotis
- Saffron-crowned tanager, Tangara xanthocephala
- Flame-faced tanager, Tangara parzudakii
- Green-and-gold tanager, Tangara schrankii
- Golden tanager, Tangara arthus
- Silver-throated tanager, Tangara icterocephala
- Blue-gray tanager, Thraupis episcopus
- Sayaca tanager, Thraupis sayaca (V)
- Palm tanager, Thraupis palmarum
- Dotted tanager, Ixothraupis varia
- Yellow-bellied tanager, Ixothraupis xanthogastra
- Spotted tanager, Ixothraupis punctata

== See also ==
- List of birds
- Lists of birds by region
