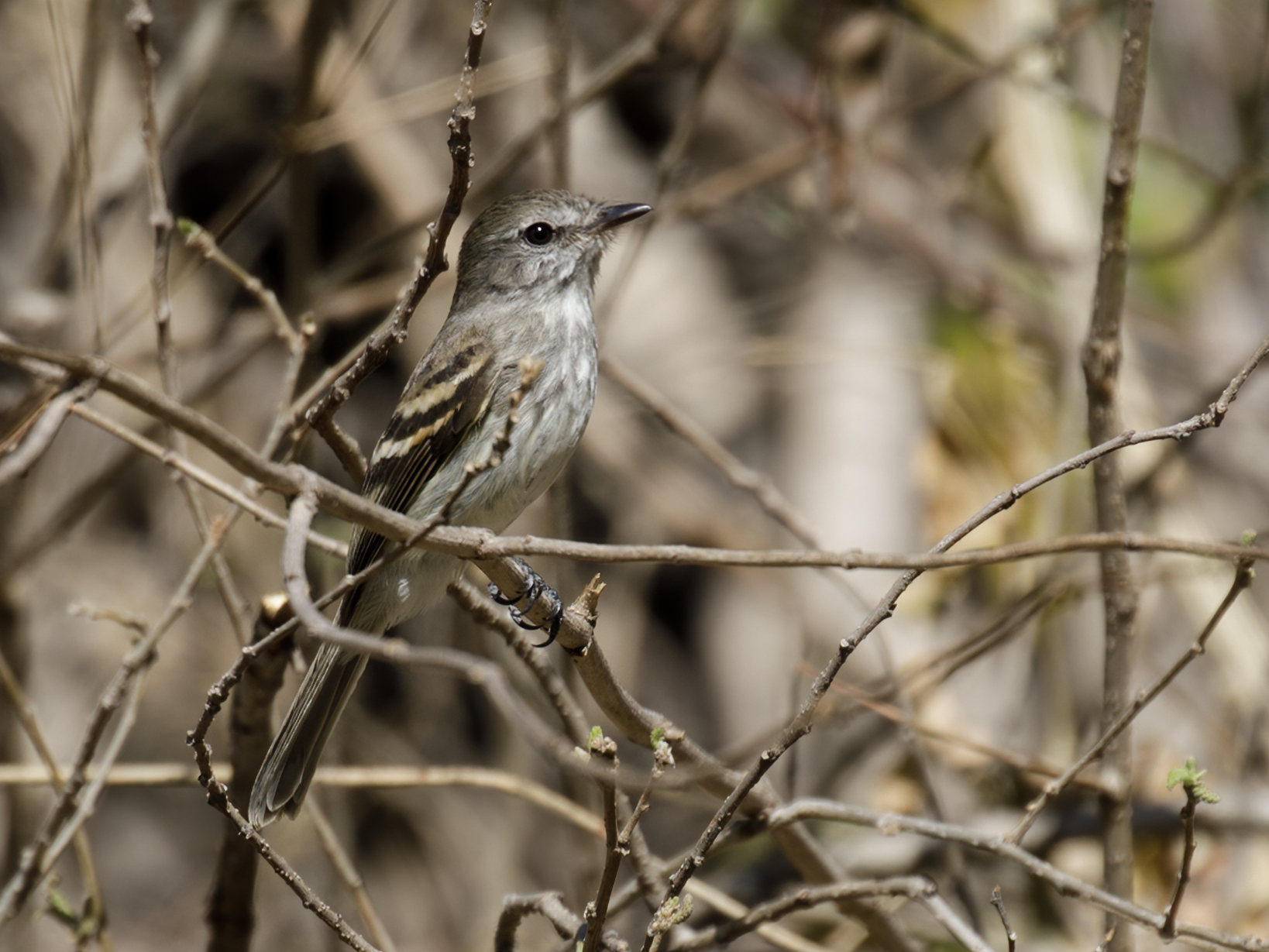

Conservation status
- Least Concern (IUCN 3.1)

Scientific classification
- Kingdom: Animalia
- Phylum: Chordata
- Class: Aves
- Order: Passeriformes
- Family: Tyrannidae
- Genus: Myiophobus
- Species: M. crypterythrus

Binomial name
- Myiophobus crypterythrus (Sclater, PL, 1861)

= Mouse-gray flycatcher =

Species of bird

The mouse-gray flycatcher or mouse-grey flycatcher (Myiophobus crypterythrus) is a species of bird in the family Tyrannidae, the tyrant flycatchers. It is found in Colombia, Ecuador, and Peru.

== Taxonomy and systematics ==
The mouse-gray flycatcher was originally described by English ornithologist Philip Sclater in 1861 from a specimen sent to him from Pallatanga, Ecuador. Sclater originally placed it in the genus Myiobius but it was later placed in Myiophobus. Its specific epithet crypterythrus comes from the Greek crypto meaning hidden, and erythrus meaning reddish, a reference to its subtle reddish wing bars that aren't obviously apparent at first glance. Sclater noted its similarity to the bran-colored flycatcher (then under the name Myiobius naevius, now Myiophobus fasciatus) but noted differences in size and plumage. In the mid-twentieth century it was reclassified as a subspecies of the bran-colored flycatcher by Carl Eduard Hellmayr under the name Myiophobus fasciatus crypterythrus. Some publications used the name western banded flycatcher for the subspecies during the 20th century. Although its distinct appearance was apparent, some believed that it didn't even warrant a subspecies, with Zimmer considering it conspecific with M. f. rufescens due to a confusing female specimen from where the ranges overlap. Following studies that identified plumage and vocal differences among the subspecies of the bran-colored flycatcher, beginning in 2016 taxonomic systems began splitting this species and what became the rufescent flycatcher (M. rufescens).

The mouse-gray flycatcher is monotypic.

== Description ==
The mouse-gray flycatcher is 12 to 12.5 cm (4.7 to 4.9 in) long. Two individuals weighed 9.5 and 12.2 g (0.34 and 0.43 oz). The sexes very similar. Adult males have a gray-brown crown with a partly hidden orange-rufous patch in the middle. Both sexes have gray-brown lores, a short white line above them, and a thin white eye-ring on an otherwise grayish brown face. Their back and rump are grayish brown. Their wings are dark brown with thin buff edges on the flight feathers and wide buff tips on the wing coverts; the latter show as two wing bars. Their tail is dark brown. Their throat and underparts are whitish with short thin grayish brown streaks on the breast and flanks. Adult females have a much smaller crown patch or none at all and have less heavily streaked underparts than males. Both sexes have a brown iris, a black bill with a small orange-yellow base to the mandible, and black legs and feet. Its previous "parent" the bran-colored flycatcher has warmer reddish brown upperparts and heavier streaking on the breast. The related rufescent flycatcher has warm brown upperparts and an unstreaked rufous breast and belly.

== Distribution ==
The mouse-gray flycatcher is found from western Nariño Department in extreme southwestern Colombia south through western Ecuador into Peru's Marañón River valley and coastally to southern Cajamarca Department. It inhabits a variety of rather open landscapes including woodlands, the edges of denser forest, shrubby clearings and pastures, and overgrown gardens in the lowlands and lower subtropical zone. In elevation it occurs from sea level to 1,500 m (4,900 ft) in Colombia and Ecuador and up to 2,700 m (8,900 ft) in Peru.

== Behavior ==
=== Movement ===
The mouse-gray flycatcher is a year-round resident.

=== Feeding ===
The mouse-gray flycatcher's diet and feeding behavior have not been studied. They are assumed to be similar to those of the bran-colored flycatcher, which see here.

=== Breeding ===
The mouse-gray flycatcher's breeding season has not been defined but in southwestern Ecuador appears to span at least from January to May. Its nest is a cup made from moss held together with spider web lined with grass and other fine plant fibers; sometimes fungal rhizomorphs, lichen, and strips of bark are incorporated. It is usually suspended in a branch fork up to about 2 m (7 ft) above the ground. The female alone is believed to make the nest. The clutch is usually two eggs that are buff with brown or dark orange flecks. The female alone incubates, for about 17 days. Fledging occurs about 11 days after hatch. Males actively defend the nest, but other details of parental care are not known.

=== Vocalization ===
The mouse-gray flycatcher's dawn song is "a leisurely and hesitating 'weé, wu-du...weé, wu-du' " or "a hesitant, repetitive, series of rich whistles: tcheep...wee'bit...chew...tcheep...". Its call is "a fast 'whee-yee-yee-yee-yee' " or "a rapid laughing phrase: REEH-hi'hi'hi'hi'hi'hi'hi".

== Status ==
The IUCN has assessed the mouse-gray flycatcher as being of Least Concern. It has a large range; its population size is not known and is believed to be stable. No immediate threats have been identified. It is considered fairly common in Ecuador and Peru. It occurs in several protected areas in both of those countries.
