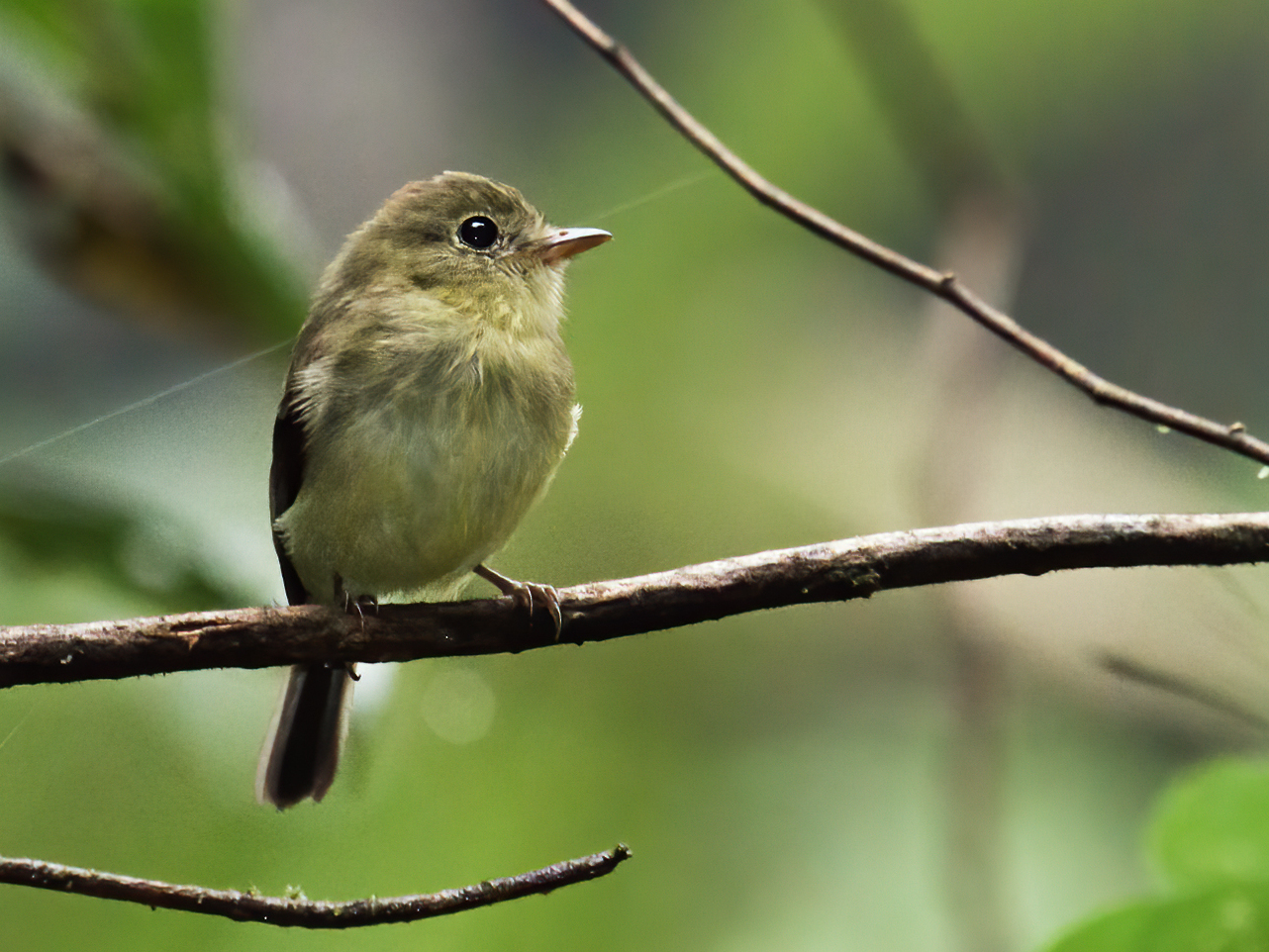
- Orange-crested flycatcher in Zamora-Chinchipe, Ecuador

Conservation status
- Least Concern (IUCN 3.1)

Scientific classification
- Kingdom: Animalia
- Phylum: Chordata
- Class: Aves
- Order: Passeriformes
- Family: Tyrannidae
- Genus: Myiophobus
- Species: M. phoenicomitra

Binomial name
- Myiophobus phoenicomitra (Taczanowski & Berlepsch, 1885)

= Orange-crested flycatcher =

Species of bird

The orange-crested flycatcher (Myiophobus phoenicomitra) is a species of bird in the family Tyrannidae, the tyrant flycatchers. It is found in Colombia, Ecuador, and Peru.

== Taxonomy and systematics ==
The orange-crested flycatcher was originally described by ornithologists Władysław Taczanowski and Hans von Berlepsch in 1885 as Myiobius phoenicomitra with the type locality being Tungurahua Province in Ecuador. It was later moved from the genus Myiobius to Myiophobus.

The orange-crested flycatcher has two subspecies, the nominate M. p. phoenicomitra (Taczanowski & Berlepsch, 1885) and M. p. litae (Hartert, 1900).

== Description ==
The orange-crested flycatcher is 11.5 to 12 cm (4.5 to 4.7 in) long and weighs about 11 g (0.39 oz). The sexes have almost identical plumage. Adult males of the nominate subspecies have an olive crown with a mostly hidden orange-rufous (rarely orange-red or golden yellow) patch in the middle. Females do not have this patch. Both sexes sometimes have a faint yellowish broken eye-ring on an otherwise olive face. Their back and rump are olive. Their wings are blackish with cinnamon edges on the flight feathers and ochraceous tips of the wing coverts; the latter show as two or three wing bars. Their tail is dusky with buffy olive edges to the feathers. Their throat and underparts are yellow that is brightest on their belly; the breast has faint olive streaks. Subspecies M. p. litae is smaller than the nominate with wider and richer ochre wing bars and a brighter yellow belly. Juveniles are similar to adult females but with browner upperparts and cinnamon wing bars. Both subspecies have a dark iris, a fairly broad bill with a black maxilla and a pinkish mandible, and black or dark gray legs and feet. The closely related flavescent flycatcher (M. flavicans) is very similar but has lighter upperparts, wider edging on the flight feathers, usually a black bill, a readily visible yellow eye-ring and line above the lores, and warmer yellow underparts.

== Distribution and habitat ==
The orange-crested flycatcher has a disjunct distribution. The nominate subspecies is found on the eastern slope of the Andes from western Putumayo Department in southern Colombia intermittently south through eastern Ecuador and separately in northwestern San Martín department in northeastern Peru. Subspecies M. p. litae is found on the western slope of the Andes from central Antioquia Department in Colombia south into northwestern Ecuador to Pichincha Province; there are also records in southern Ecuador's El Oro Province. The species inhabits the interior and edges of humid forest in the foothills and subtropical zones. In elevation it occurs below 1,550 m (5,100 ft) in Colombia, between 600 and 1,550 m (2,000 and 5,100 ft) in Ecuador, and between 1,100 and 1,400 m (3,600 and 4,600 ft) in Peru. Though there is much range overlap with the flavescent flycatcher, that species is generally found at higher elevations.

== Behavior ==
=== Movement ===
The orange-crested flycatcher is a year-round resident.

=== Feeding ===
The orange-crested flycatcher feeds on arthropods. It typically forages alone or in pairs, usually in the forest's understory. It seldom joins mixed-species feeding flocks. When perched it has an erect posture. It takes prey in mid-air and from foliage, twigs, and the ground with short flights from a perch.

=== Breeding ===
The orange-crested flycatcher apparently breeds at least between March and June in western Colombia, but nothing else is known about the species' breeding biology.

=== Vocalization ===
As of early 2025 all but one of the recordings of orange-crested flycatcher in xeno-canto were taken in Ecuador; the one came from Colombia. The song in Ecuador is "a weak, thin, high-pitched 'tsut-tseép-tsu' ".

== Status ==
The IUCN has assessed the orange-crested flycatcher as being of Least Concern. It has a restricted range; its population size is not known and is believed to be decreasing. No immediate threats have been identified. It is considered uncommon in Colombia, local but possibly overlooked in Ecuador, and very local in Peru. It occurs in Ecuador's Podocarpus and Sangay National Parks.
