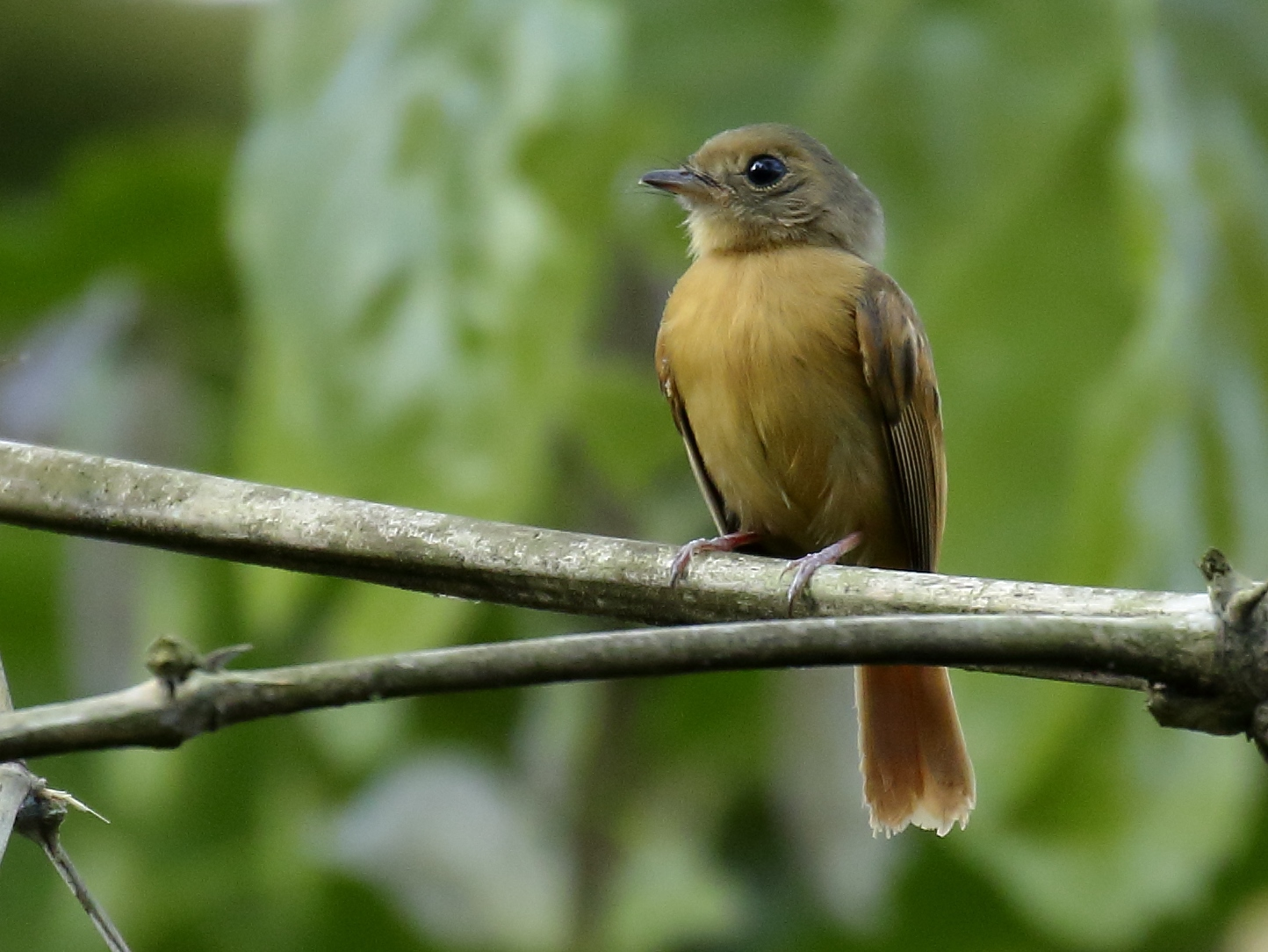
- at Rio Branco, Acre state, Brazil

Conservation status
- Least Concern (IUCN 3.1)

Scientific classification
- Kingdom: Animalia
- Phylum: Chordata
- Class: Aves
- Order: Passeriformes
- Family: Onychorhynchidae
- Genus: Terenotriccus; Ridgway, 1905
- Species: T. erythrurus

Binomial name
- Terenotriccus erythrurus (Cabanis, 1847)

= Ruddy-tailed flycatcher =

Species of bird

The ruddy-tailed flycatcher (Terenotriccus erythrurus) is a small passerine bird in the family Onychorhynchidae. It was previously place in family Tityridae. Its range extends from southeast Mexico south to the Amazon rainforest. It is the only member of the genus Terenotriccus, but some authorities place it in genus Myiobius. However, it differs in voice, behaviour, and structure from members of that group.

== Taxonomy ==
The ruddy-tailed flycatcher was formally described and illustrated in 1847 by the German ornithologist Jean Cabanis under the binomial name Myiobius erythrurus. The type locality is Cayenne in French Guiana. The specific epithet combines the Ancient Greek ερυθρος/eruthros meaning "red" with -ουρος/-ouros meaning "-tailed". The ruddy-tailed flycatcher is now the only species placed in the genus Terenotriccus that was introduced in 1905 by the American ornithologist Robert Ridgway. The genus name combines the Ancient Greek τερενος/terenos meaning "soft" or "delicate" with τρικκος/trikkos, an unidentified small bird which in ornithology signifies a tyrant flycatcher.

Eight subspecies are recognised:

- T. e. fulvigularis (Salvin & Godman, 1889) – southeast Mexico to north Venezuela, west Colombia and northwest Ecuador
- T. e. signatus Zimmer, JT, 1939 – east Colombia, east Ecuador, east Peru and west Brazil
- T. e. venezuelensis Zimmer, JT, 1939 – east Colombia, south Venezuela and northwest Brazil
- T. e. erythrurus (Cabanis, 1847) – east Venezuela, the Guianas and northeast Brazil north of the Amazon
- T. e. hellmayri (Snethlage, E, 1907) – northeast Brazil south of the Amazon
- T. e. purusianus (Parkes & Panza, 1993) – Rio Purús region of west Brazil
- T. e. amazonus Zimmer, JT, 1939 – central north Brazil south of the Amazon
- T. e. brunneifrons Hellmayr, 1927 – east Peru, southwest Brazil and north, west Bolivia

== Description ==
The ruddy-tailed flycatcher is 9.0–10.3 cm (3.5–4.1 in) long and weighs 7 g (0.25 oz). The upperparts are grey-olive, with a rufous rump, tail, wings and eye ring. The throat is buff and the breast is cinnamon, becoming pale buff on the belly. Sexes are similar, but young birds are brighter above and have a browner tail and breast. It has a see-oo see call, and a repetitive eek eek eek eek eek song. It sometimes flicks both wings up to make a faint whirring sound.

== Distribution ==
The ruddy-tailed flycatcher is found in lowlands from southeastern Mexico to northern Bolivia, north-central Brazil and the Guianas. It ranges east of the Andes cordillera into the entire Amazon Basin of northern Brazil and the Guianas; to the west of the Andes in Colombia and Ecuador into Central America.

== Behaviour and ecology ==
The ruddy-tailed flycatcher is mainly solitary, and only occasionally joins mixed-species feeding flocks. It feeds on insects, especially leafhoppers, picked from foliage or taken in acrobatic aerial pursuit.

=== Breeding ===
This tiny flycatcher breeds from sea level to 1,000 m (3,300 ft) altitude, locally to 1,200 m (3,900 ft), in wet mountain forests and in adjacent tall second growth. The nest is a pear-shaped pouch of plant fibres and leaves with a visored side entrance, built by the female 2–6 m (7–20 ft) high in the undergrowth and suspended from a twig or vine. The two chocolate-blotched white eggs are incubated by the female for 15–16 days to hatching, the male playing no part in the care of the eggs or young.
