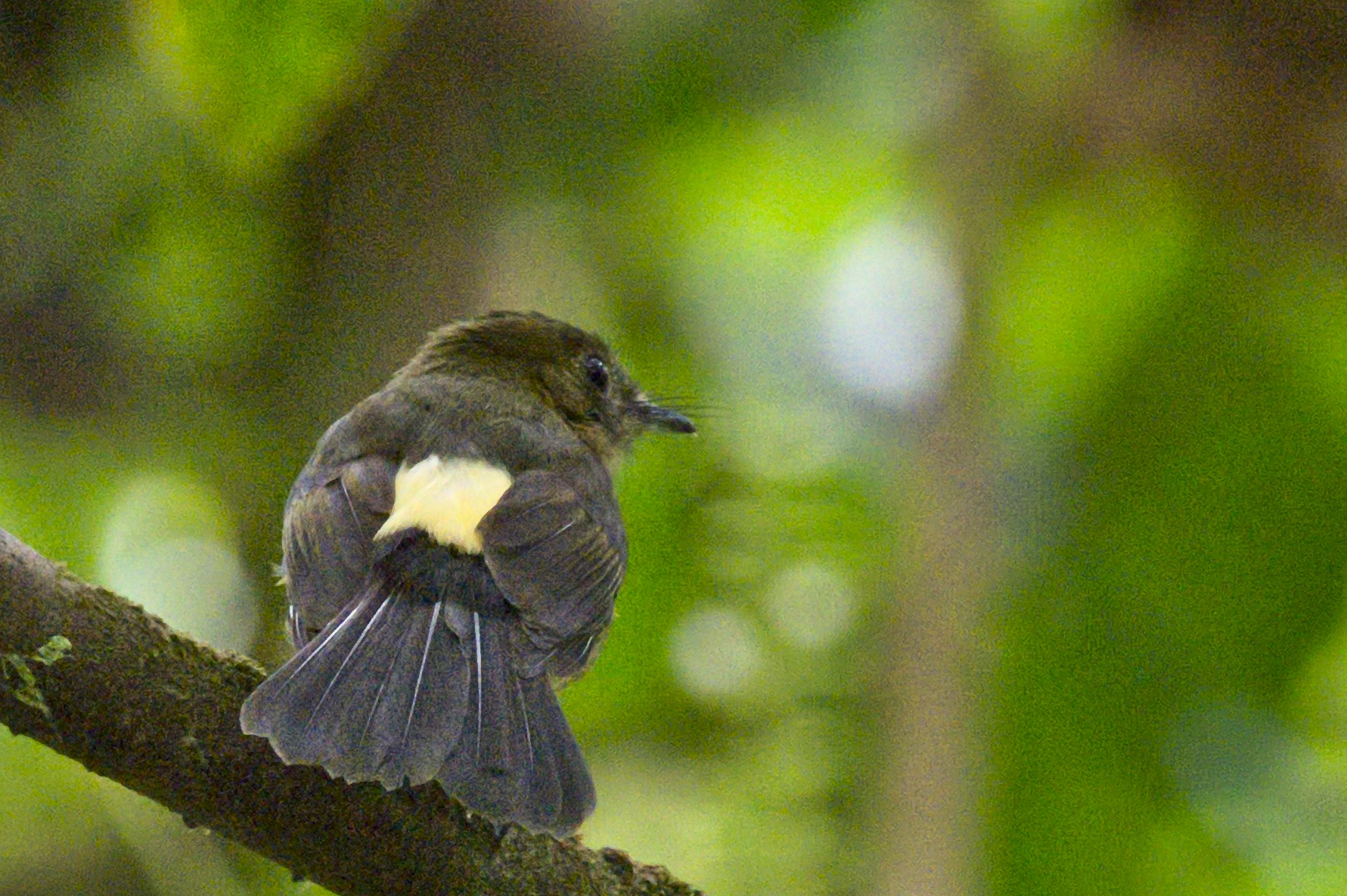

Conservation status
- Least Concern (IUCN 3.1)

Scientific classification
- Kingdom: Animalia
- Phylum: Chordata
- Class: Aves
- Order: Passeriformes
- Family: Onychorhynchidae
- Genus: Myiobius
- Species: M. villosus

Binomial name
- Myiobius villosus Sclater, PL, 1860

= Tawny-breasted myiobius =

Species of bird

The tawny-breasted myiobius or tawny-breasted flycatcher (Myiobius villosus) is a species of passerine bird in the family Onychorhynchidae. It is found in Bolivia, Colombia, Ecuador, Panama, Peru, and Venezuela. Its natural habitat is subtropical or tropical moist montane forests.

== Subspecies ==
Four subspecies are recognised; M. v. villosus from Panama, western Colombia and western Ecuador; M. v. schaeferi from northern Colombia and northwestern Venezuela; M. v. clarus from eastern Ecuador and eastern Peru; and M. v. peruvianus from southeastern Peru and northwestern Bolivia.

== Description ==
The tawny-breasted myiobius grows to a length of about 14 cm (5.5 in). The upper parts are mainly dark olive, and the rump is yellow. There is usually a yellow patch on the crown in males that is normally kept hidden; this patch is cinnamon-brown in females. The underparts are mainly reddish-brown, the throat is dull white and the centre of the belly has a pale yellow patch. The otherwise similar sulphur-rumped myiobius (Myiobius sulphureipygius) has paler upper parts and much yellower underparts, with tawniness only present at the sides. The black-tailed myiobius (Myiobius atricaudus) lacks any tawniness on its underparts, but in any event, these are lowland species, with the tawny-breasted myiobius occurring at higher elevations than the other members of its genus.

== Distribution and habitat ==
The species is native to rainforests in the foothills of the mountains of tropical South America. Its range includes Venezuela, Colombia, Panama, Ecuador, Peru and Bolivia. Its altitudinal range extends from 600 to 2,100 m (2,000 to 6,900 ft).

== Status ==
Myiobius villous is generally described as uncommon, and its total population is suspected of declining as its rainforest habitat is destroyed. However it has a very wide range and a presumed large total population, so the International Union for Conservation of Nature has assessed its conservation status as being of "least concern".
