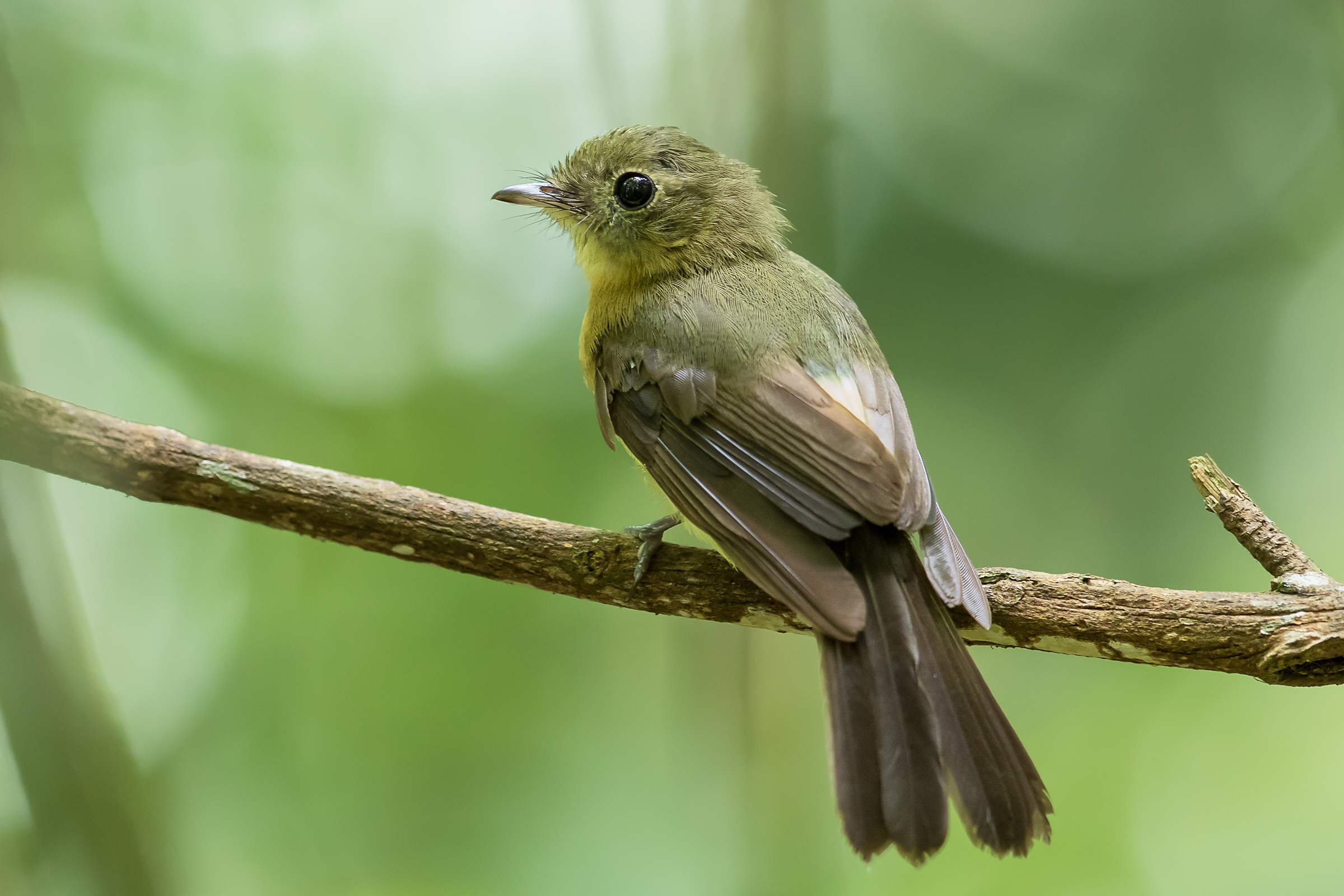

Conservation status
- Least Concern (IUCN 3.1)

Scientific classification
- Kingdom: Animalia
- Phylum: Chordata
- Class: Aves
- Order: Passeriformes
- Family: Onychorhynchidae
- Genus: Myiobius
- Species: M. barbatus

Binomial name
- Myiobius barbatus (Gmelin, JF, 1789)

= Whiskered myiobius =

Species of bird

The whiskered myiobius or bearded flycatcher (Myiobius barbatus) is a species of bird in the family Onychorhynchidae, having previously been included in Tyrannidae and Tityridae. Some taxonomic authorities continue to place them with the flycatchers or tityras. The whiskered myiobius is found in Brazil, Colombia, Ecuador, French Guiana, Guyana, Peru, Suriname, and Venezuela. Its natural habitats are subtropical or tropical moist lowland forests and heavily degraded former forest.

== Taxonomy ==
The whiskered myiobius was formally described in 1789 by the German naturalist Johann Friedrich Gmelin in his revised and expanded edition of Carl Linnaeus's Systema Naturae. He placed it with the flycatcher in the genus Muscicapa and coined the binomial name Muscicapa barbata. The specific epithet is from the Latin barbatus meaning "bearded". Gmelin based his description on "Le barbichon de Cayenne" that had been described in 1778 by the French polymath the Comte de Buffon and illustrated with a hand-coloured engraving by François-Nicolas Martinet. The whiskered myiobius is now one of four species placed in the genus Myiobius that was erected in 1839 by George Gray.

Five subspecies are recognised:

- M. b. semiflavus Todd, 1919 – central east Colombia
- M. b. barbatus (Gmelin, JF, 1789) – southeast Colombia to north Peru, south Venezuela, the Guianas and north Brazil
- M. b. amazonicus Todd, 1925 – east Peru and west Brazil
- M. b. insignis Zimmer, JT, 1939 – northeast Brazil south of the Amazon
- M. b. mastacalis (Wied-Neuwied, M, 1821) – southeast Brazil

== Description ==
The whiskered myiobius is very similar in appearance to several closely related species. It has olive upper parts, an obvious yellow rump and a usually well-concealed yellow patch on the crown. The rictal bristles round the beak are long and form a basket-like structure. The underparts are greyish-olive and the belly pale yellow. The tail is black and somewhat rounded. It is usually a silent bird, but sometimes utters a staccato "psik".

== Distribution and habitat ==
The species is widely distributed in tropical South America. It is found in the Amazon basin in the northern half of Brazil, northeastern Peru, eastern Ecuador, eastern Colombia, southern Venezuela, Guyana, Suriname and French Guiana. Its typical habitat is the lower parts of the canopy of humid rainforest at altitudes of less than 900 m (3,000 ft). It is more often found in the middle of forests than is the black-tailed myiobius (M. atricaudus), and in Amazonia occurs at lower elevations than the tawny-breasted myiobius (M. villosus).

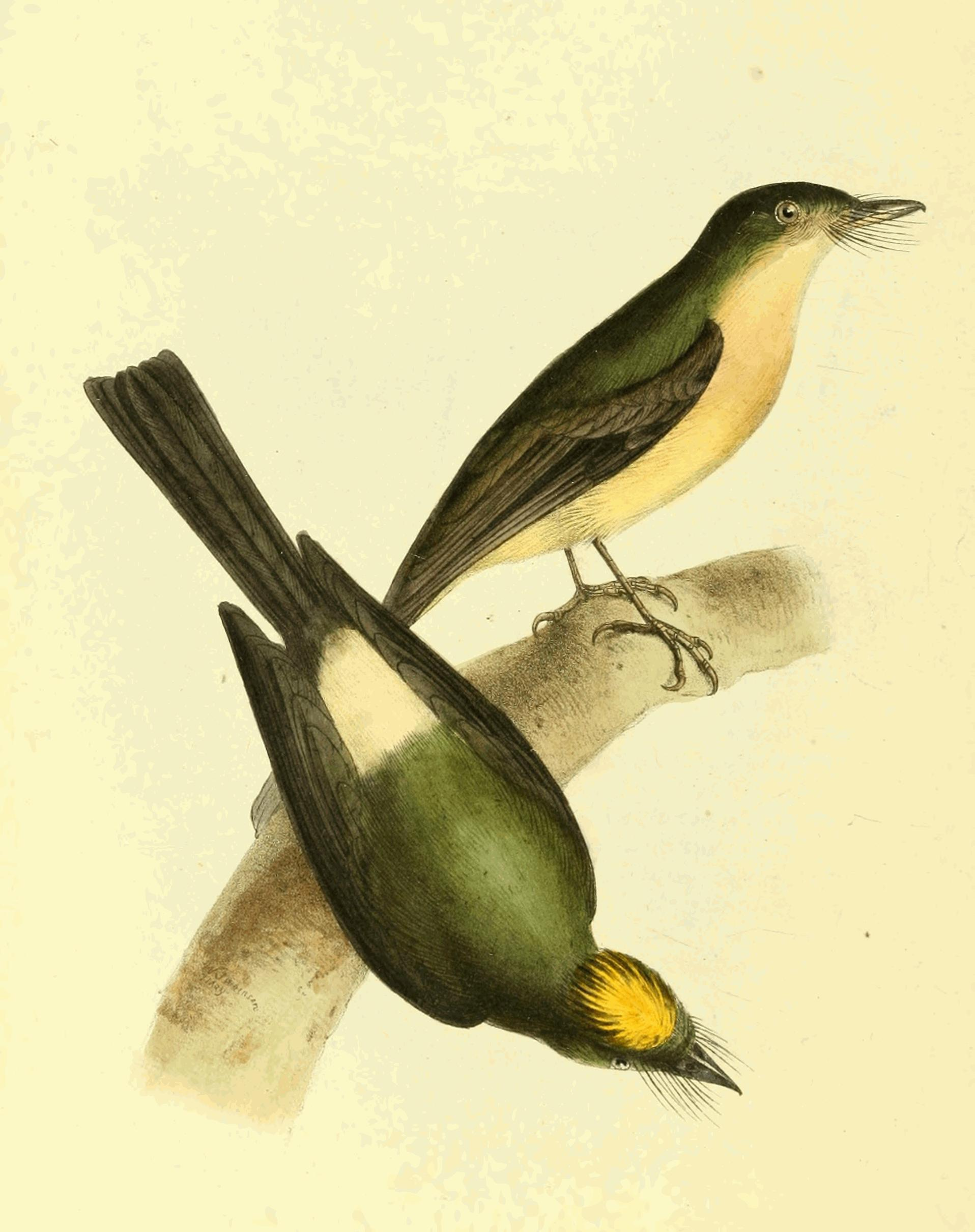

== Ecology ==
Like other myiobius, the diet consists largely of insects, many of which are caught aerobatically on the wing. It often forages in small mixed flocks. When perched, this bird often droops its wings and fans the feathers of the tail in a manner reminiscent of Old World fantails (Rhipidura).

== Status ==
No particular threats facing this bird have been identified. It is generally uncommon, but it has a very wide range and the population seems to be steady, so the International Union for Conservation of Nature has rated its conservation status as being of "least concern".
