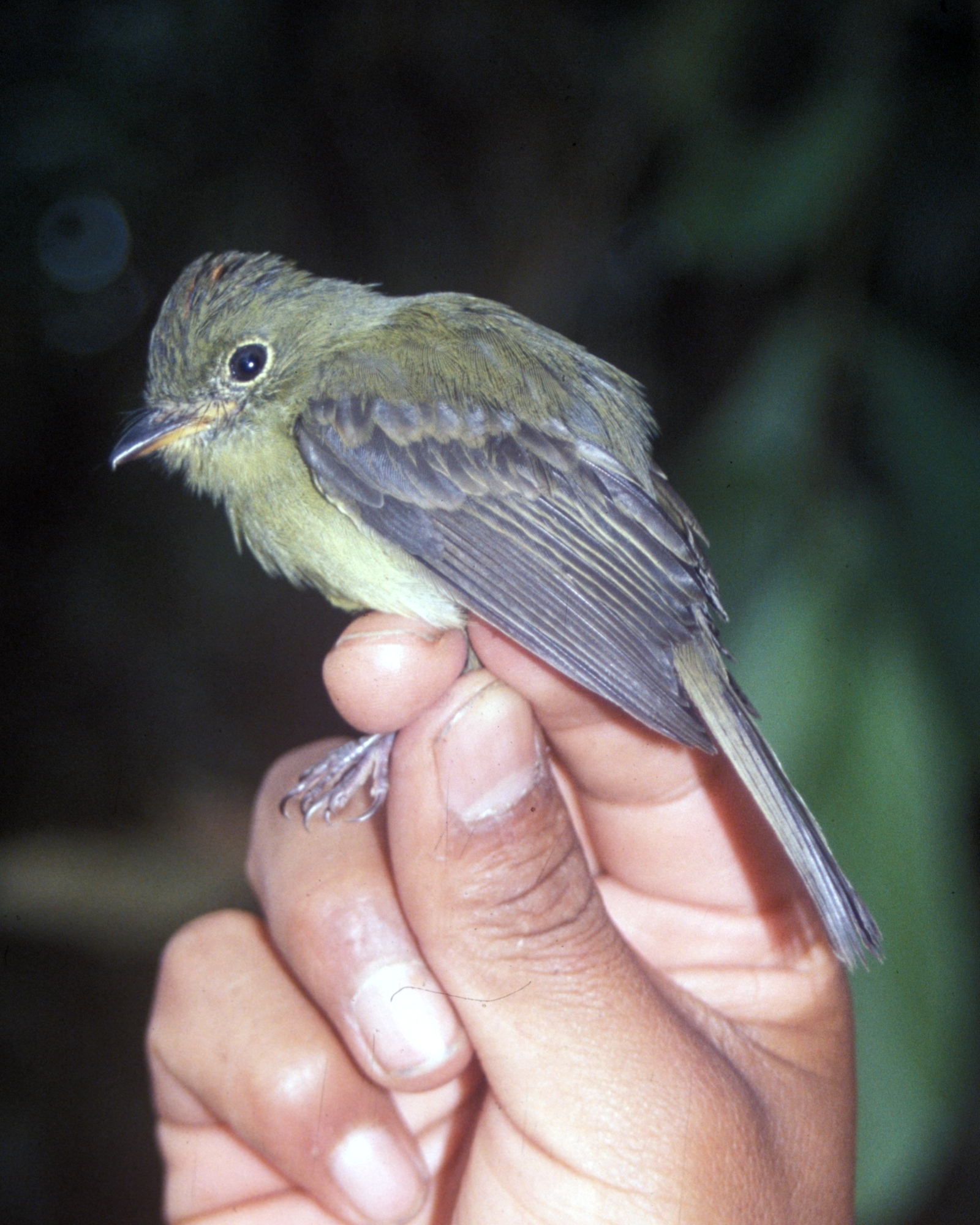
- Orange-crested flycatcher (Myiophobus phoenicomitra)

Scientific classification
- Kingdom: Animalia
- Phylum: Chordata
- Class: Aves
- Order: Passeriformes
- Family: Tyrannidae
- Subfamily: Fluvicolinae
- Genus: Myiophobus; Reichenbach, 1850

Type species
- Tyrannula ferruginea Swainson, 1835

= Myiophobus =

Genus of birds

Myiophobus is a genus of South American birds in the tyrant flycatcher family Tyrannidae.

== Taxonomy ==
The genus Myiophobus was introduced in 1850 by the German naturalist Ludwig Reichenbach. The name combines the Ancient Greek μυια/muia, μυιας/muias meaning "fly" with φοβος/phobos meaning "terror", "fear" or "panic". As Reichenbach did not specify a type species, in 1855 the English zoologist George Gray designated the type as Muscicapa ferruginea Swainson. Gray made an error as in 1835 William Swainson had placed this species in the genus Tyrannula rather than in Muscicapa. Swainson's name Tyrannula ferruginea is considered to be a junior synonym of Muscicapa flammiceps Temminck, CJ, 1822, which is now a subspecies of Muscicapa fasciata Müller, the bran-colored flycatcher.

== Species ==
The genus contains the following eight species:

Image	Common name	Scientific name	Distribution
	Olive-chested flycatcher	Myiophobus cryptoxanthus	Ecuador and Peru
	Flavescent flycatcher	Myiophobus flavicans	Colombia, Ecuador, Peru, and Venezuela
	Unadorned flycatcher	Myiophobus inornatus	Bolivia and Peru
	Orange-crested flycatcher	Myiophobus phoenicomitra	Colombia, Ecuador, and Peru.
	Roraiman flycatcher	Myiophobus roraimae	Bolivia, Brazil, Colombia, Ecuador, Guyana, Peru, and Venezuela
	Bran-colored flycatcher	Myiophobus fasciatus	Costa Rica through Bolivia, Uruguay, and Argentina
	Mouse-gray flycatcher	Myiophobus crypterythrus	southwest Colombia, western Ecuador, and northwestern Peru
	Rufescent flycatcher	Myiophobus rufescens	western Peru and northern Chile
