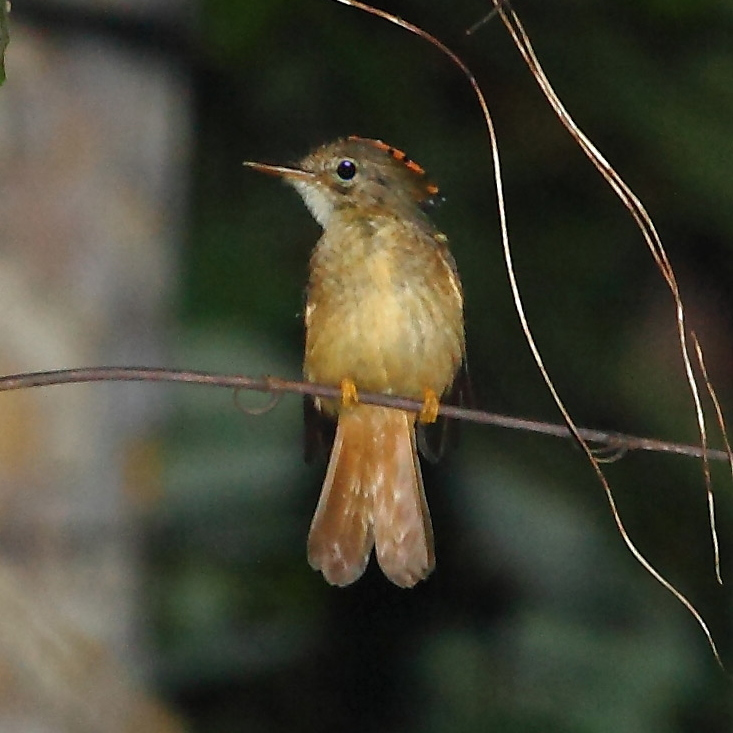

Conservation status
- Least Concern (IUCN 3.1)

- Vulnerable (IUCN 3.1)

Scientific classification
- Kingdom: Animalia
- Phylum: Chordata
- Class: Aves
- Order: Passeriformes
- Family: Onychorhynchidae
- Genus: Onychorhynchus
- Species: O. coronatus

Binomial name
- Onychorhynchus coronatus (Statius Müller, PL, 1776)
- Range of O. c. coronatus and O. c. castelnaui (see the Taxonomy and Distribution sections)

= Tropical royal flycatcher =

Species of bird

The tropical royal flycatcher (Onychorhynchus coronatus) is a passerine bird that most taxonomic systems place in family Onychorhynchidae. It is found in Mexico, south through most of Central America, and in every mainland South American country except Argentina, Chile, Paraguay, and Uruguay.

== Taxonomy ==
The tropical royal flycatcher was formally described in 1776 by the German zoologist Philipp Statius Müller under the binomial name Muscicapa coronata. Müller based his account on a hand-colored illustration of the "Tyran hupé de Cayenne" that had been engraved by François-Nicolas Martinet. The specific epithet is from Latin coronatus meaning "crowned". The tropical royal flycatcher is now placed together with Atlantic royal flycatcher in the genus Onychorhynchus that was introduced in 1810 by the German naturalist Gotthelf Fischer von Waldheim.

After a complicated history (which see here), the International Ornithological Committee (IOC) and the Clements taxonomy placed the tropical royal flycatcher and the Atlantic royal flycatcher (O. swainsoni) in family Onychorhynchidae.

However, the tropical royal flycatcher's taxonomy remains unsettled. The North and South American Classification Committees of the American Ornithological Society (AOS) combine the tropical and Atlantic royal flycatchers as the widespread royal flycatcher (O. coronatus sensu lato). Like the IOC and Clements the AOS places O. coronatus in family Onychorhynchidae, and the three systems include other species in that family. (The South American committee is seeking a proposal for reevaluation of the taxa.) BirdLife International's Handbook of the Birds of the World (HBW) treats the tropical and Atlantic royal flycatchers as four species and retains them in family Tityridae where the IOC and Clements had earlier placed them.

The IOC and Clements recognize these five subspecies of the tropical royal flycatcher:

- O. c. castelnaui Deville, 1849
- O. c. coronatus (Müller, PLS, 1776)
- O. c. mexicanus (Sclater, PL, 1857)
- O. c. fraterculus Bangs, 1902
- O. c. occidentalis (Sclater, PL, 1860)

Subspecies O. c. mexicanus and O. c. occidentalis have sometimes been treated as separate species.

== Description ==
The tropical royal flycatcher is approximately 12.5 to 18 cm (4.9 to 7.1 in) long and weighs 9.7 to 21 g (0.34 to 0.74 oz). It has an erectile fan-shaped crest. In the nominate subspecies O. c. coronatus it is red with blue tips in the male and yellow or orange in the female. The sexes' plumages are otherwise alike. Adults have a broken buffy eye ring and a faint buffy streak on the cheek. Their upperparts are dark brown with narrow black and buffy bars on the lower back. Their rump and tail are cinnamon-rufous that is browner towards the end of the tail. Their wings are dark brown with small buff spots on the tips of the coverts and tertials. Their throat is whitish, their breast warm buff with narrow black bars, and their belly plain warm buff. Their iris is various shades of brown, their maxilla dark brown to blackish, their mandible horn to yellowish or orange, and their legs and feet dull yellow or orangish.

Subspecies O. c. castelnaui is very like the nominate, though slightly smaller and with less barring on the back. O. c. mexicanus is the largest subspecies. Its upperparts are not as dark as the nominate's, its tail more rufous, its chin and throat white, and its breast has less barring. O. c. fraterculus is slightly smaller than mexicanus, with a paler cinnamon rump and tail and even less barring on the breast. O. c. occidentalis is about the same size as fraterculus. It is mostly bright buffy brown, with a pale tawny tail and an unmarked breast. The male's crest is more red than the nominate's orange, with black tips.

== Distribution and habitat ==
The subspecies of the tropical royal flycatcher are found thus:

- O. c. castelnaui: east of the Andes in western Amazonia, from southeastern Colombia and Venezuela's Amazonas state south through Ecuador into Peru and northern Bolivia and east in Brazil to the Rio Negro and Rio Tapajós
- O. c. coronatus: southern and eastern Venezuela, the Guianas, and in Brazil east of the Rio Negro and Rio Tapajós
- O. c. mexicanus: southeastern Mexico to Panama
- O. c. fraterculus: northern Colombia and northwestern Venezuela
- O. c. occidentalis: western Ecuador discontinuously from Esmeraldas Province to El Oro Province and slightly into Peru's Department of Tumbes

The tropical royal flycatcher inhabits humid lowlands, both primary evergreen and second growth forests. It is a bird of the lower levels and midstory, often along streams and in seasonally flooded várzea forest. In elevation it ranges from sea level to 1,200 m (3,900 ft) in much of Central America and Colombia though lower in Costa Rica. In Brazil it occurs below 1,000 m (3,300 ft), in eastern Ecuador below 400 m (1,300 ft), and in western Ecuador below 600 m (2,000 ft).

== Behavior ==
=== Movement ===
The tropical royal flycatcher appears to be a year-round resident in most of its range. Some seasonal movements have been noted on Mexico's Yucatán Peninsula and in southwestern Ecuador.

=== Feeding ===
The tropical royal flycatcher is insectivorous. Most subspecies forage low in the forest, up to about 3 m (10 ft) above the ground, though O. c. occidentalis will often feed as high as 15 m (50 ft). The species typically forages singly or less often in pairs, and occasionally joins mixed-species feeding flocks. It sallies from a perch to capture prey in mid-air or from foliage and branches, and returns to the perch to eat it.

=== Breeding ===
The tropical royal flycatcher's breeding season has not been established. Their nest is long and narrow and is suspended from a branch or vine, usually above water. The clutch is two eggs; only the female incubates them and broods and feeds the nestlings.

=== Vocalization ===
The tropical royal flycatcher is usually inconspicuous and quiet. Its songs differ among the subspecies. That of O. c. coronatus and O. c. castelnaui is "a series of long melodious whistles, starting with a loud flat-pitched introductory note and followed by a series of lower-pitched disyllabic mellow whistles wheeee-pihuuw-pihuuuw-pihuuw". That of O. c. mexicanus in Mexico is "a descending, slowing series of plaintive whistles, usually 5‒8, whi' peeu peeu peeu peeu peeu ..., or wh' wheeu wheeu ...". Further south it is "a series of rather sharp downslurred whistles preceded by a short introductory note, whit..eeeuw...eeeuw...eeeuw". The song of O. c. occidentalis has seldom been recorded and has not been described. The species' calls include "a loud, mellow, hollow-sounding keeeyup or keee-yew", "a low-pitched sur-líp", and "a squeaky to hollow, plaintive whee-uk or see-yuk".

== Status ==
The IUCN follows HBW taxonomy and so has separately assessed the northern, Amazonian, and Pacific royal flycatchers. The northern royal flycatcher is of Least Concern. It has a very large range but an unknown population size that is believed to be decreasing. No immediate threats have been identified. The Amazonian royal flycatcher is also of Least Concern. It has an extremely large range and an estimated population of at least 500,000 mature individuals; the latter is believed to be decreasing. No immediate threats have been identified. The Pacific royal flycatcher is assessed as Vulnerable. It has a limited range and its estimated population of between 2500 and 10,000 mature individuals is believed to be decreasing. The principal threat is clearance of forest for residential expansion, agriculture, and ranching. The species is overall rather uncommon but O. c. occidentalis is considered scarce to rare.

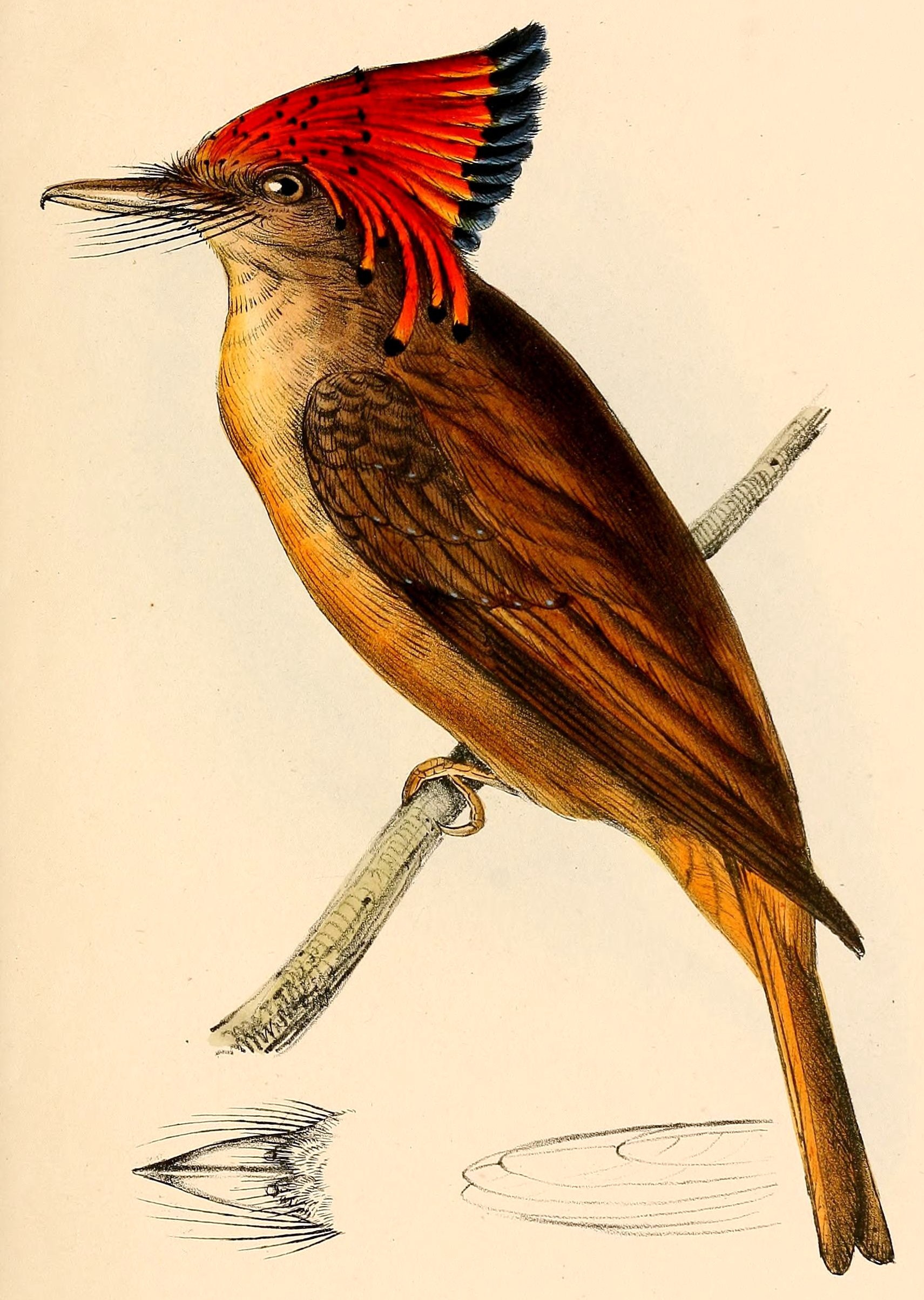
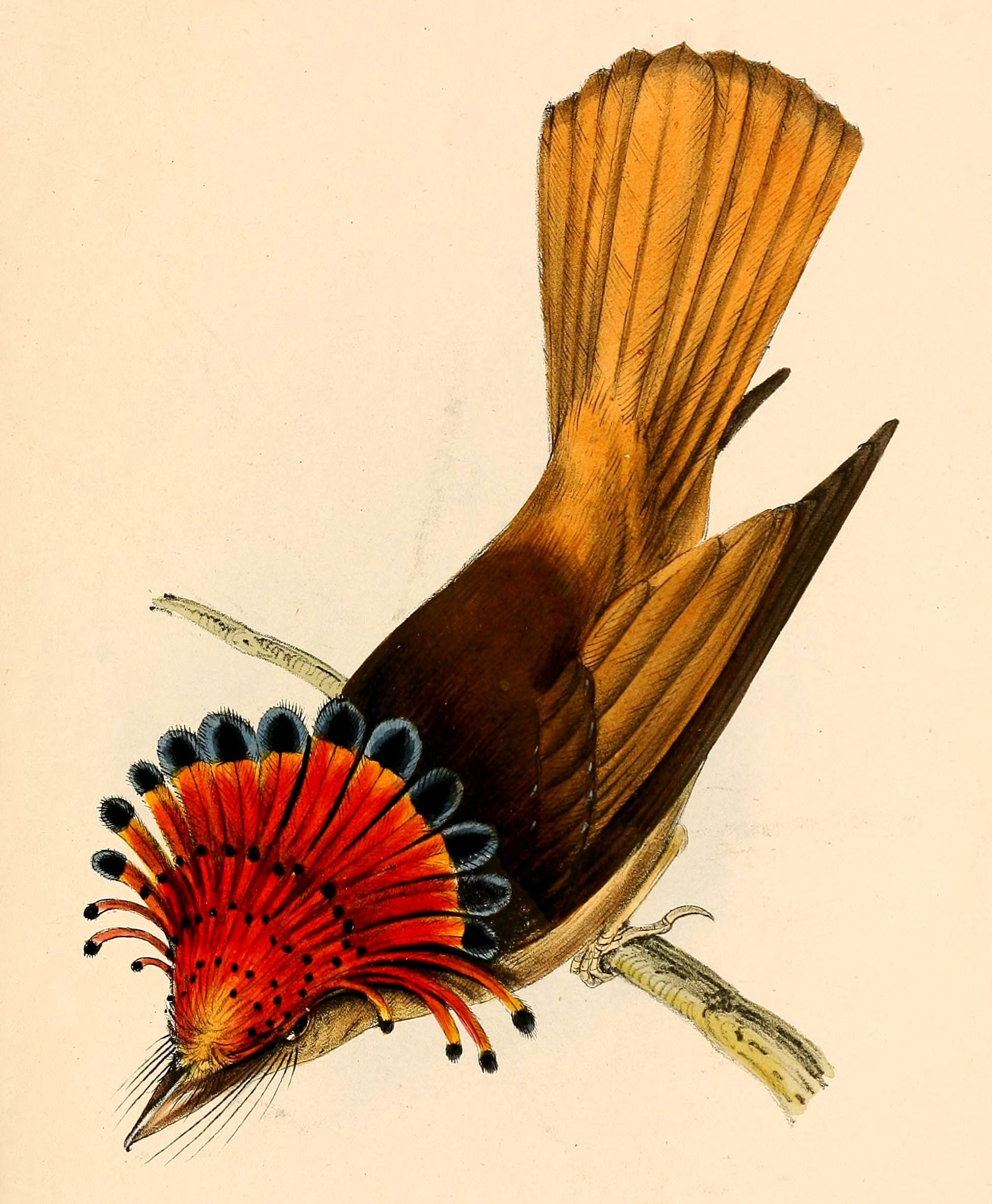
