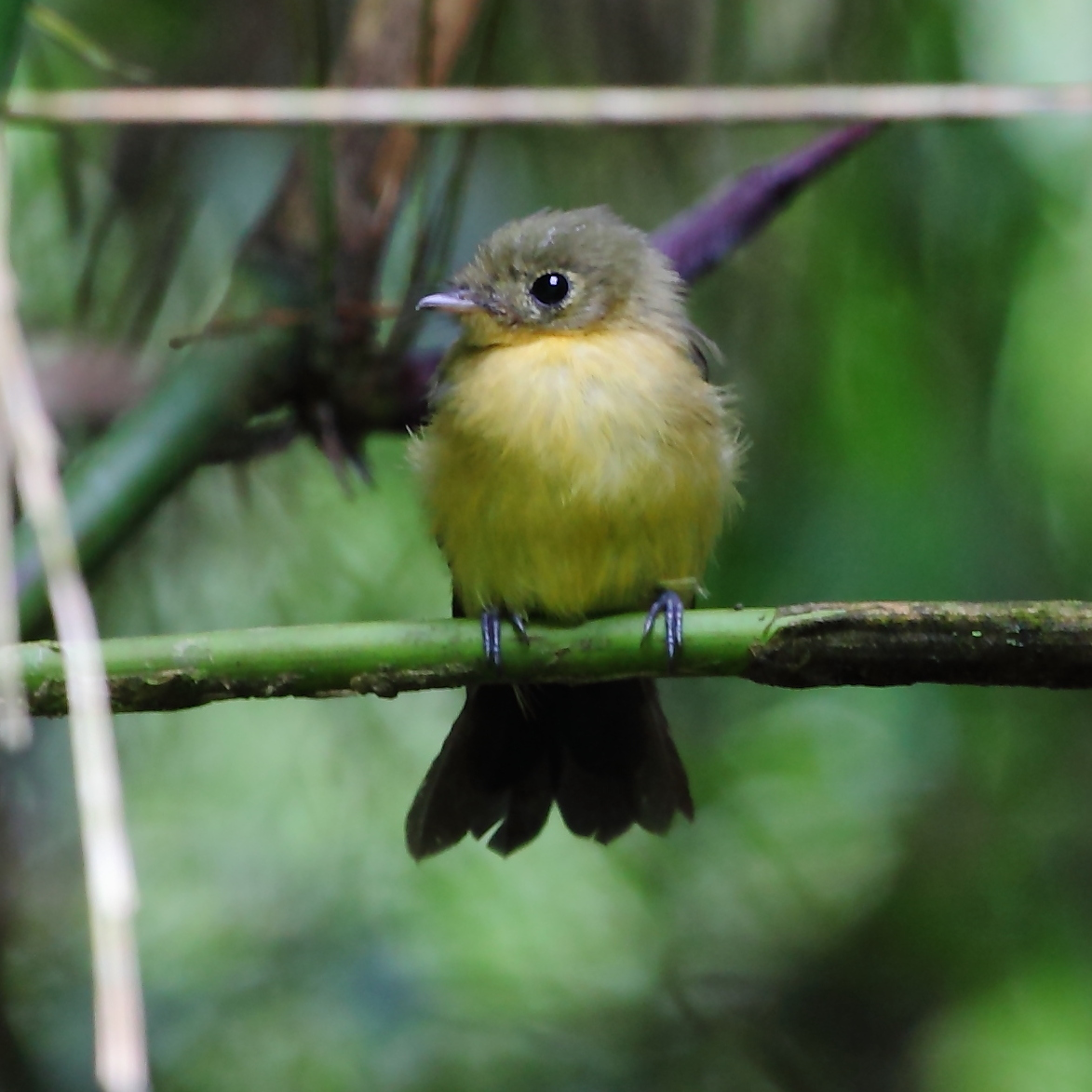
- At São Luiz do Paraitinga, Brazil

Conservation status
- Least Concern (IUCN 3.1)

Scientific classification
- Kingdom: Animalia
- Phylum: Chordata
- Class: Aves
- Order: Passeriformes
- Family: Onychorhynchidae
- Genus: Myiobius
- Species: M. atricaudus

Binomial name
- Myiobius atricaudus Lawrence, 1863

= Black-tailed myiobius =

Species of bird

The black-tailed myiobius or black-tailed flycatcher (Myiobius atricaudus) is a species of passerine bird in the family Onychorhynchidae. It was previously placed in family Tyrannidae or Tityridae. Black-tailed flycatchers are found in Brazil, Colombia, Costa Rica, Ecuador, Panama, Peru, and Venezuela. Their natural habitats are subtropical or tropical moist lowland forests and heavily degraded former forest. They are usually found alone or in pairs, but may join flocks of several species.

== Subspecies ==
Seven subspecies are recognised; M. a. atricaudus from south-western Costa Rica, Panama and western Colombia; M. a. portovelae from western Ecuador and north-western Peru; M. a. modestus from eastern Venezuela; M. a. adjacens from southern Colombia, eastern Ecuador, eastern Peru and western Brazil; M. a. connectens from north-eastern Brazil south of the River Amazon; M. a. snethlagei from north-eastern and eastern Brazil; M. a. ridgwayi from southeastern Brazil.

== Description ==
The black-tailed myiobius closely resembles the whiskered myiobius (M. barbatus) and the sulphur-rumped myiobius (M. sulphureipygius) in appearance, with olive upper parts and a yellow rump. The underparts differ in being buff rather than tawny or greyish-olive, but birds living in eastern Brazil tend to have yellowish or yellowish-buff underparts. Another distinguishing feature is the location in which the bird is seen. The black-tailed myobius haunts woodland edges and secondary forests and is less active or acrobatic than the other two species; it is found at altitudes up to 1,400 m (4,600 ft).

== Distribution and habitat ==
The species has a patchy distribution in tropical Central and South America. It is present in Costa Rica, Panama, Colombia, Venezuela, Ecuador, Peru (on both sides of the Andes) and large parts of Brazil. Where their ranges overlap, it is generally found in drier habitats than the whiskered myiobius (M. barbatus), and at higher elevations. It generally frequents forest verges and secondary growth, often near water, whereas the whiskered myiobius prefers the interior of forests.

== Status ==
Destruction of the Amazon rainforest is reducing the area of suitable habitat for this bird and its numbers are thought to be in decline. It is an uncommon species with a patchy distribution, nevertheless, it has a very wide range and the total population size is likely to be large; as a result, the International Union for Conservation of Nature has classified it as being of "least concern.
