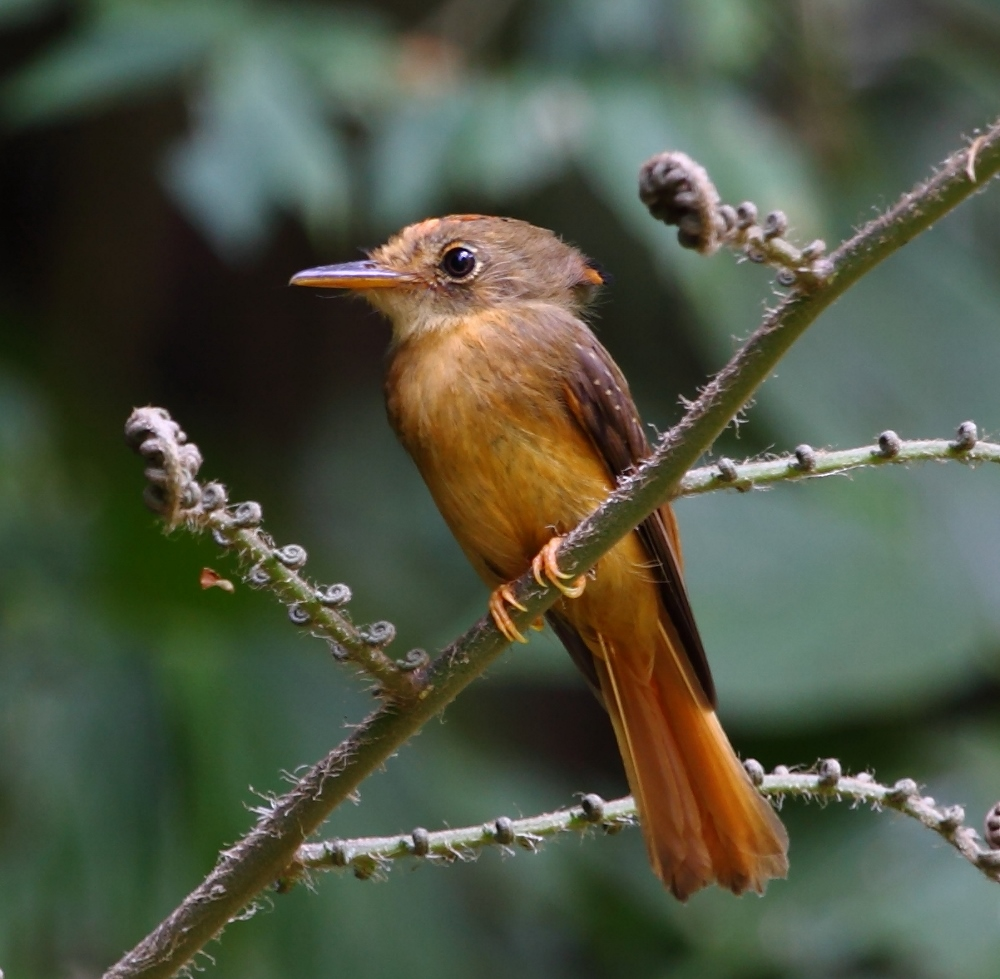
- At Tapiraí, São Paulo state, Brazil

Conservation status
- Vulnerable (IUCN 3.1)

Scientific classification
- Kingdom: Animalia
- Phylum: Chordata
- Class: Aves
- Order: Passeriformes
- Family: Onychorhynchidae
- Genus: Onychorhynchus
- Species: O. swainsoni

Binomial name
- Onychorhynchus swainsoni (Pelzeln, 1858)

= Atlantic royal flycatcher =

Species of bird in Brazil

The Atlantic royal flycatcher (Onychorhynchus swainsoni) is a passerine bird that most taxonomic systems place in the Onychorhynchidae family. It is endemic to Brazil.

== Taxonomy and systematics ==
After a complicated history (which see here), the International Ornithological Committee (IOC) and the Clements taxonomy placed the Atlantic royal flycatcher and the tropical royal flycatcher (O. coronatus) in family Onychorhynchidae.

However, the Atlantic royal flycatcher's taxonomy remains unresolved. The North and South American Classification Committees of the American Ornithological Society (AOS) combine the Atlantic and tropical royal flycatchers as the widespread royal flycatcher (O. coronatus sensu lato). Like the IOC and Clements the AOS places O. coronatus in family Onychorhynchidae, and the three systems include other species in that family. (The South American committee is seeking a proposal for reevaluation of the taxa.) BirdLife International's Handbook of the Birds of the World (HBW) treats the Atlantic and tropical royal flycatchers as four species and retains them in family Tityridae where the IOC and Clements had earlier placed them.

The Atlantic royal flycatcher is monotypic.

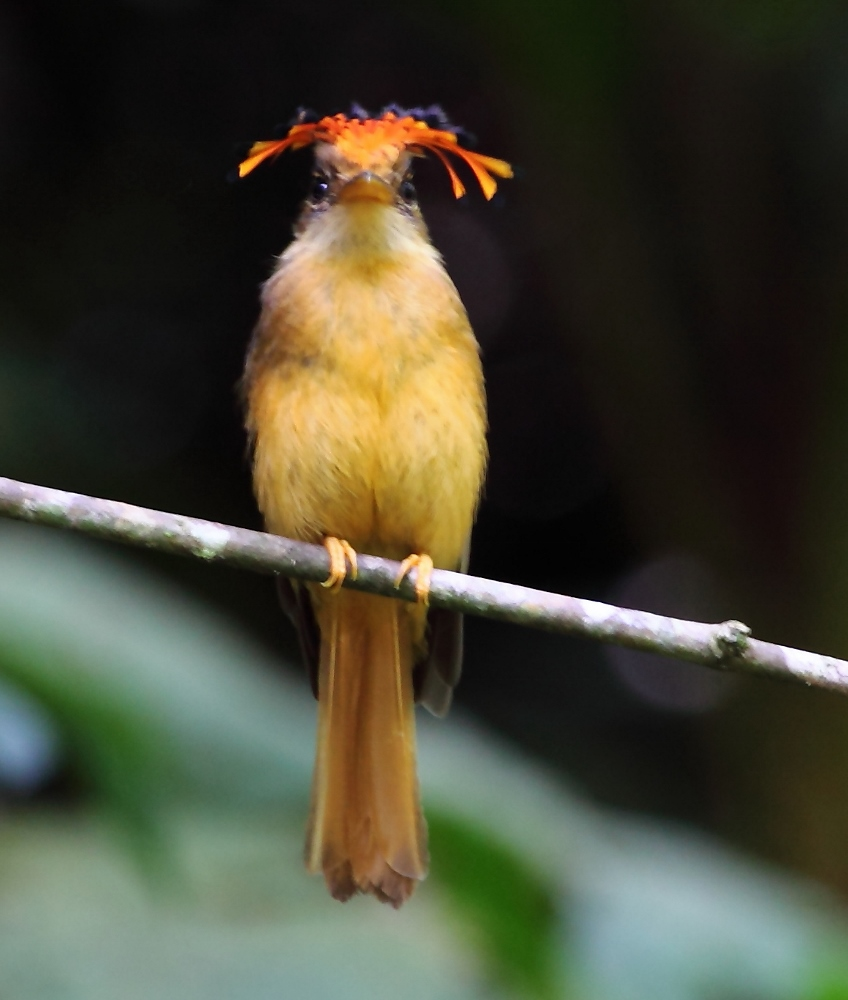
Displaying partially opened crest at Tapiraí, São Paulo state, Brazil

== Description ==
The Atlantic royal flycatcher is 16 to 16.5 cm (6.3 to 6.5 in) long. One specimen weighed 23.5 g (0.83 oz). This large-billed flycatcher has a spectacular, but rarely seen, crest. The upper parts are mostly dull brown with a bright cinnamon rump and tail. It has a whitish throat and ochraceous buff underparts. It has an erectile fan-shaped crest that when raised is scarlet, black, and blue in the male and yellow or orange, black, and blue in the female.

== Distribution and habitat ==
The Atlantic royal flycatcher is found only in the Atlantic forest of southeastern Brazil, from Bahia State south to northern Santa Catarina State. It inhabits humid lowlands, both primary evergreen and second growth forests. It is a bird of the midstory.

== Behavior ==
=== Movement ===
The Atlantic royal flycatcher is believed to be a year-round resident.

=== Feeding ===
The Atlantic royal flycatcher's diet has not been detailed but is thought to be mostly or entirely insects. It usually forages singly but occasionally joins mixed-species feeding flocks. It captures prey by sallies from a perch.

=== Breeding ===
The Atlantic royal flycatcher breeds in the austral spring, with active nests known between October and January. The nest is a long and narrow bag suspended from a branch or vine, usually above water. The usual clutch is two eggs; only the female incubates them and broods and feeds the nestlings.

=== Vocalization ===
The Atlantic royal flycatcher is usually inconspicuous and quiet. When heard, its song is a "series of overslurred whistles weeep...weeep....weeep..." and its call a "rather piercing short note, yeeek!, repeated many times".

== Status ==
The IUCN has assessed the Atlantic royal flycatcher as vulnerable. "The species has recently been discovered at a number of new locations; however, the population is estimated at 600-1,700 mature individuals and declining rapidly."
