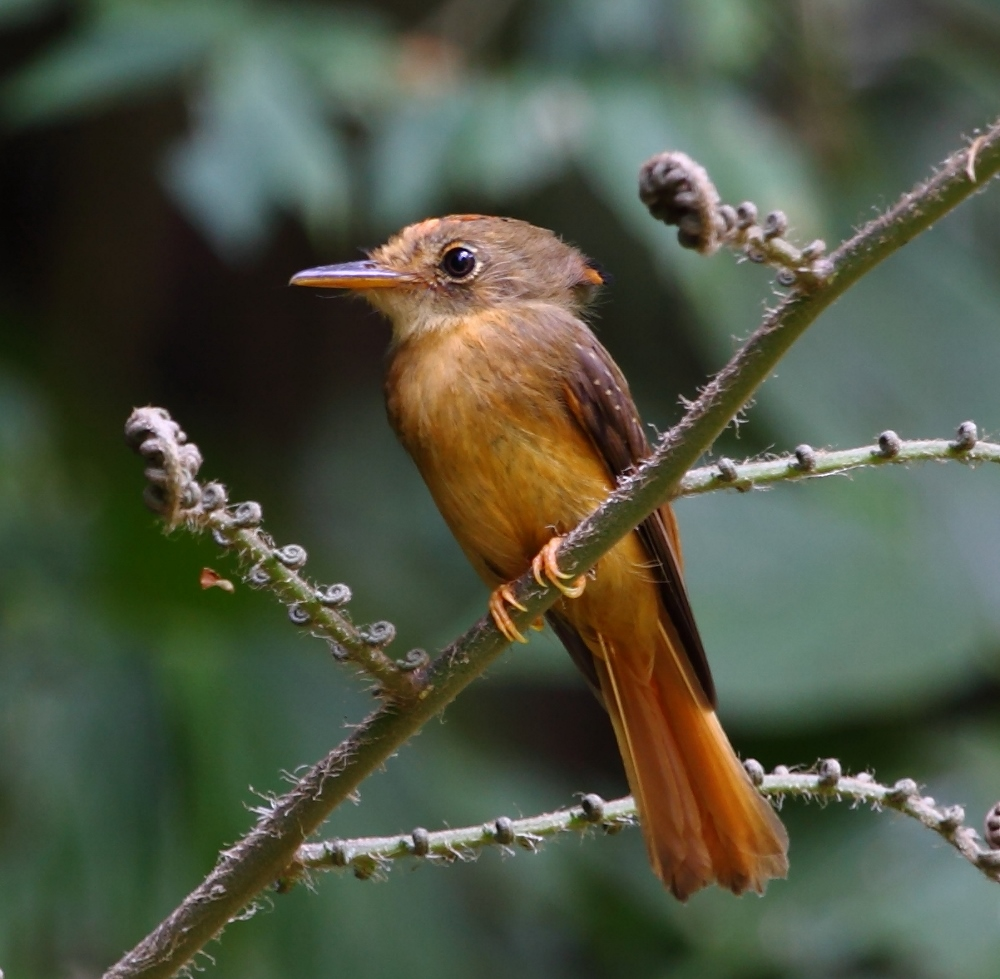
- Atlantic royal flycatcher (Onychorhynchus swainsoni)

Scientific classification
- Kingdom: Animalia
- Phylum: Chordata
- Class: Aves
- Order: Passeriformes
- Parvorder: Tyrannida
- Family: Onychorhynchidae; Tello, Moyle, Marchese & Cracraft, 2009

Type genus
- Onychorhynchus Fischer von Waldheim, 1810

Genera
- See text

= Onychorhynchidae =

Family of birds

Onychorhynchidae is small family of suboscine passerine birds found in forest and woodland in the Neotropics.

== Taxonomy and systematics ==
The family Onychorhynchidae was introduced (as the tribe Onychorhynchini) in 2009 by José G. Tello and collaborators.

The cladogram below shows the phylogenetic relationships of the families in the parvorder Tyrannida. It is based on the study by Carl Oliveros and collaborators published in 2019 and the study by Michael Harvey and collaborators that was published in 2020. The families and species numbers are from the list maintained by the International Ornithologists' Union (IOC).

- Tyrannida
  - Tityridae
    becards & allies (37 species in 7 genera)
  - - Tyrannidae
      tyrant flycatchers (447 species in 106 genera)
    - - Oxyruncidae
        Oxyruncus – sharpbill
      - Onychorhynchidae
        - Onychorhynchus – royal flycatchers (2 species)
        - - Terenotriccus – ruddy-tailed flycatcher
          - Myiobius – myiobiuses (4 species)

=== Species ===
The family contains seven species in three genera.

Image	Genus	Living species
	Onychorhynchus Fischer von Waldheim, 1810	Atlantic royal flycatcher (Onychorhynchus swainsoni); Tropical royal flycatcher (Onychorhynchus coronatus)
	Myiobius Gray, GR, 1839	Tawny-breasted myiobius (Myiobius villosus); Sulphur-rumped myiobius (Myiobius sulphureipygius); Whiskered myiobius (Myiobius barbatus); Black-tailed myiobius (Myiobius atricaudus)
	Terenotriccus Ridgway, 1905	Ruddy-tailed flycatcher (Terenotriccus erythrurus)
