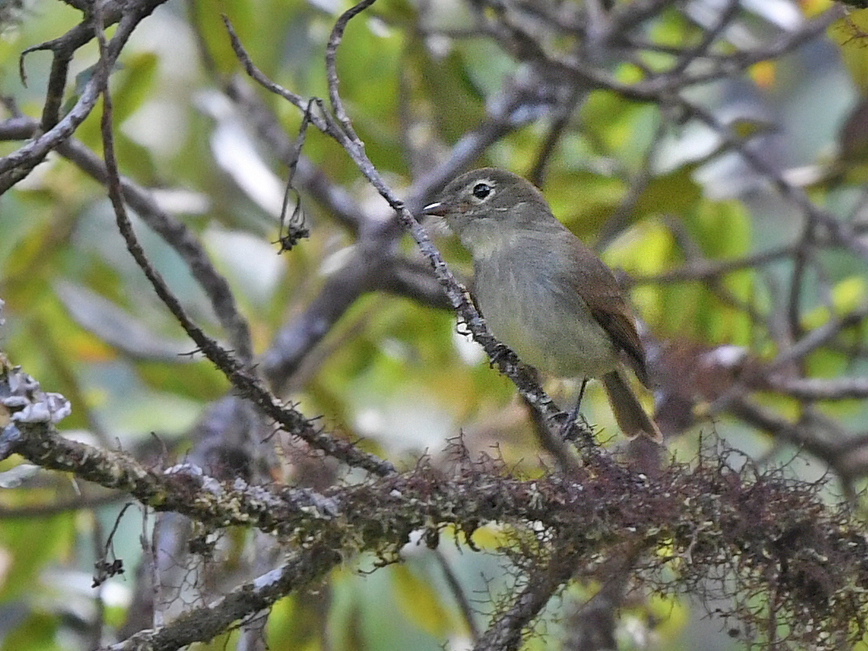

Conservation status
- Least Concern (IUCN 3.1)

Scientific classification
- Kingdom: Animalia
- Phylum: Chordata
- Class: Aves
- Order: Passeriformes
- Family: Tyrannidae
- Genus: Myiophobus
- Species: M. inornatus

Binomial name
- Myiophobus inornatus Carriker, 1932

= Unadorned flycatcher =

Species of bird

The unadorned flycatcher (Myiophobus inornatus) is a species of bird in the family Tyrannidae, the tyrant flycatchers. It is found in Bolivia and Peru.

== Taxonomy and systematics ==
The unadorned flycatcher is monotypic.

== Description ==
The unadorned flycatcher is about 11.5 cm (4.5 in) long and weighs about 9 to 12 g (0.32 to 0.42 oz). The sexes have almost identical plumage. Adult males have an olive crown with a mostly hidden yellow or orange patch in the middle. Females do not have this patch. Both sexes have a yellowish line above the lores and an obvious yellowish eye-ring on an otherwise olive face. Their back and rump are olive. Their wings are dusky with cinnamon rufous edges on the flight feathers and tips of the wing coverts; the latter show as two wing bars. Their tail is dusky with olive buff edges to the feathers. Their throat is yellowish white and the rest of their underparts pale yellow; the breast has faint olive streaks. They have a brown iris, a bill with a black maxilla and a pinkish brown, pale brown, or pinkish gray mandible, and highly variable gray to brown legs and feet.

== Distribution and habitat ==
The unadorned flycatcher is found along the eastern slope of the Andes from Cuzco Department in south-central Peru south into Bolivia as far as Cochabamba Department. It inhabits the understory to mid-story of humid montane forest. In elevation it ranges between 1,000 and 2,100 m (3,300 and 6,900 ft) in Peru and up to 2,500 m (8,200 ft) in Bolivia.

== Behavior ==
=== Movement ===
The unadorned flycatcher is a year-round resident.

=== Feeding ===
The unadorned flycatcher feeds on arthropods. It typically forages alone or in pairs, usually in the forest's understory to mid-story. It seldom joins mixed-species feeding flocks. When perched it has an erect posture. It takes prey in mid-air and from foliage and twigs with short flights from a perch.

=== Breeding ===
The unadorned flycatcher's breeding season has not been defined but includes October and November. Nothing else is known about the species' breeding biology.

=== Vocalization ===
The unadorned flycatcher's vocalizations are not well known; as of early 2025 xeno-canto had nine recordings and the Cornell Lab of Ornithology's Macaulay Library had 11. Its call is "an explosive, thin, sharp tsickl".

== Status ==
The IUCN has assessed the unadorned flycatcher as being of Least Concern. It has a large range; its population size is not known and is believed to be decreasing. No immediate threats have been identified. It is considered uncommon to fairly common in Peru. "As is the case with all species of birds that occupy the interior of humid forests, Unadorned Flycatcher will be vulnerable to habitat loss or degradation through such activities such as logging, road construction, or expanding agriculture."
