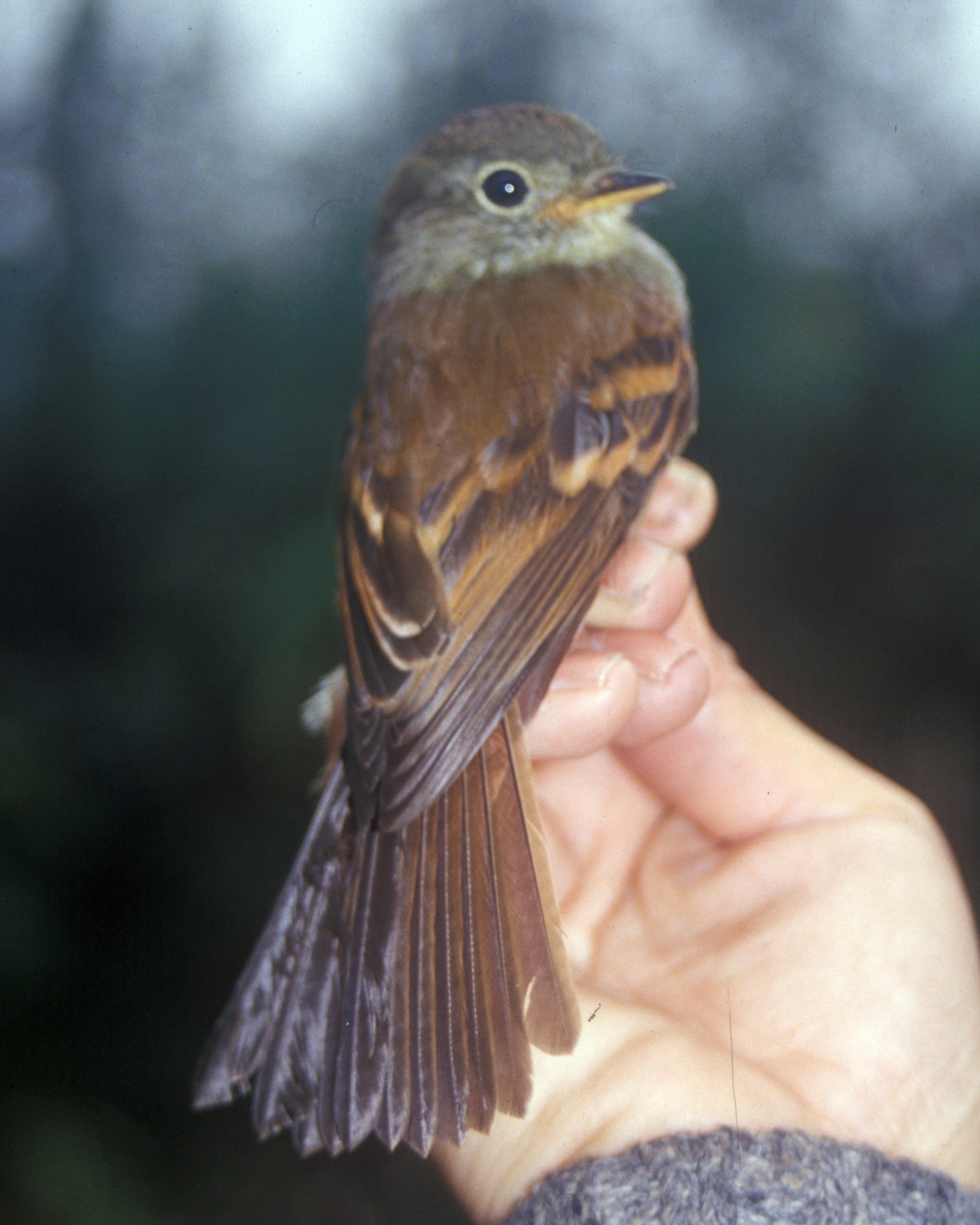

Conservation status
- Least Concern (IUCN 3.1)

Scientific classification
- Kingdom: Animalia
- Phylum: Chordata
- Class: Aves
- Order: Passeriformes
- Family: Tyrannidae
- Genus: Myiophobus
- Species: M. roraimae

Binomial name
- Myiophobus roraimae (Salvin & Godman, 1883)

Synonyms
- Myiobius roraimae

= Roraiman flycatcher =

Species of bird

The Roraiman flycatcher (Myiophobus roraimae) is a species of bird in the family Tyrannidae, the tyrant flycatchers. It is found in Brazil, Colombia, Ecuador, Guyana, Peru, Venezuela, and possibly in Bolivia.

== Taxonomy and systematics ==
The Roraiman flycatcher was originally described as Myiobius roraimae from what was then British Guiana, now Guyana.

The Roraiman flycatcher has three subspecies, the nominate M. r. roraimae (Salvin & Godman, 1883), M. r. sadiecoatsae (Dickerman & Phelps, WH Jr, 1987), and M. r. rufipennis (Carriker, 1932).

Subspecies M. r. rufipennis was originally described as a full species, Myiophobus rufipennis. In 1966 Meyer de Schauensee reclassified it as a subspecies of M. roraimae "without providing rationale" and that treatment has been followed since then.

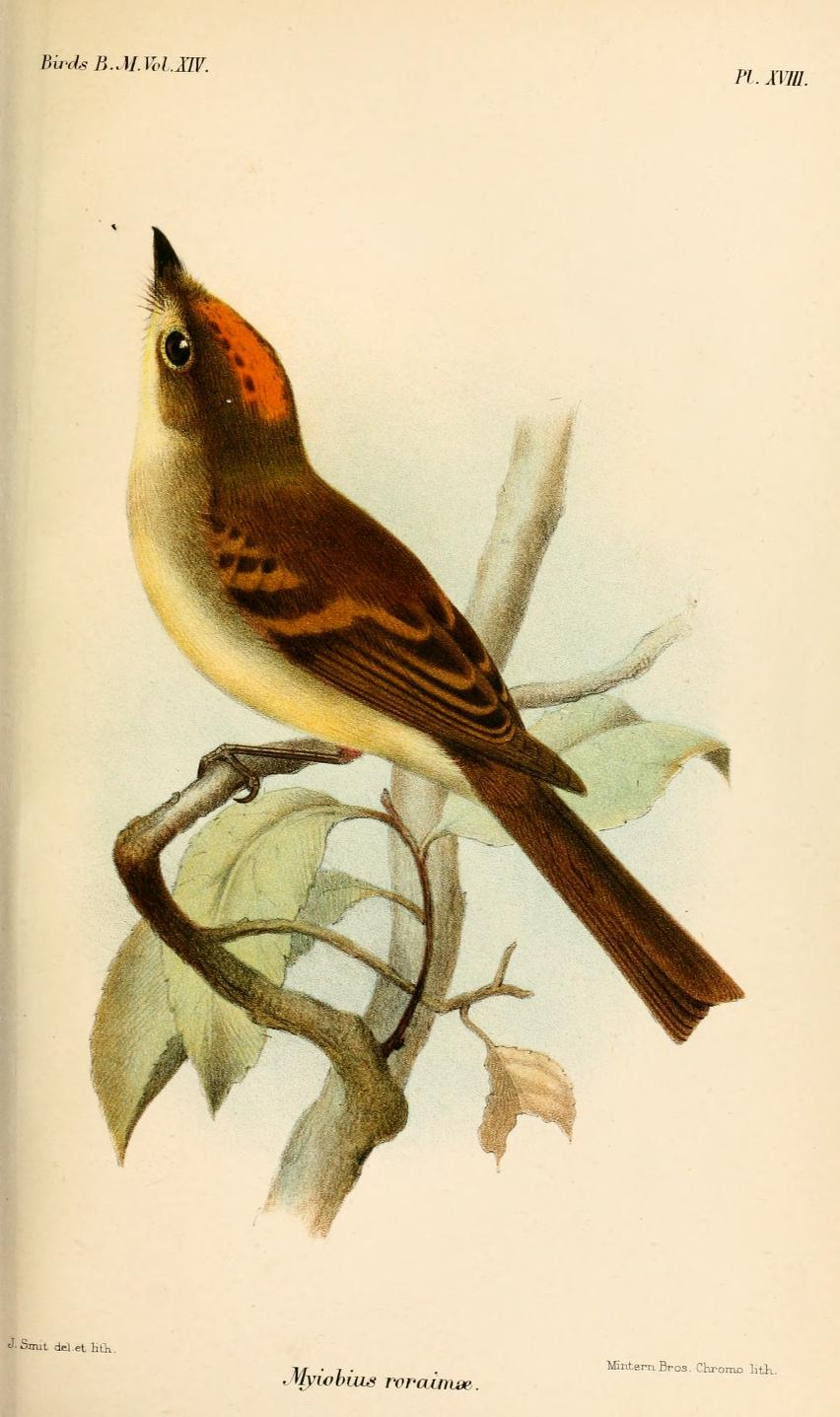
Illustration by Joseph Smit, 1888

== Description ==
The Roraiman flycatcher is 13.5 to 14 cm (5.3 to 5.5 in) long and weighs 12.8 to 13.6 g (0.45 to 0.48 oz). The sexes have almost identical plumage. Adult males of the nominate subspecies have an olive-tinged warm rufescent brown crown with a mostly hidden orange-rufous patch in the middle. Females do not have this patch. Both sexes have an inconspicuous yellowish white broken eye-ring on an otherwise olive brown face. Their back and rump are olive-brown. Their wings are dusky to blackish with wide rufous edges on the flight feathers and tips of the wing coverts; the latter show as two wing bars. Their tail is dusky brown with indistinct dark rufous edges to the feathers. Their throat is dull grayish white, their breast and flanks dull grayish olive, and their belly's center pale yellow. They have a dark brown iris, a fairly wide bill with a grayish brown maxilla and a dull orange-yellow mandible, and gray legs and feet. The other two subspecies are very similar to the nominate.

== Distribution and habitat ==
The Roraiman flycatcher has a highly disjunct distribution, and sources differ on the ranges of the subspecies. The Cornell Lab of Ornithology's Birds of the World and the International Ornithological Committee (IOC) place the nominate subspecies in southern and southeastern Venezuela and western Guyana. Hilty places it in Venezuela "on tepuis of [southeastern] Bolívar". He lists western Guyana as a location without naming the subspecies occurring there. Cornell and Hilty place subspecies M. r. sadiecoatsae on Cerro de la Neblina that straddles the border between southern Venezuela and northwestern Brazil, and the IOC places it in that area without naming Cerro de la Neblina. The map in van Perlo shows a few records in Brazil's northern Amazonas state without noting a subspecies; the location is consistent with the other sources' M. r. sadiecoatsae range. Cornell places M. r. rufipennis from eastern Colombia south through Ecuador and eastern Peru slightly into northwestern Bolivia and notes it occurs only locally throughout that range. The IOC concurs without noting its local occurrence. The map in the IUCN account shows its range as a series of dots along the Andes. Field guides to the birds of Colombia, Ecuador, and Peru are consistent with this range description without noting a subspecies.

The South American Classification Committee of the American Ornithological Society is an outlier. It does not address subspecies, but places the Roraiman flycatcher in Brazil, Ecuador, Guyana, Peru, and Venezuela but not in Colombia. It has records from Bolivia that lack documentation and so calls the species hypothetical in that country. BirdLife International places it as a resident in Brazil, Colombia, Ecuador, Guyana, Peru, and Venezuela and as a "breeding visitor" in Bolivia.

The Clements taxonomy is a much more significant outlier. It places the nominate subspecies in "southeastern Colombia to eastern Ecuador, southern Venezuela, western Guyana, and western Brazil", subspecies M. r. sadiecoatsae on "tepuis of southern Venezuela (Bolívar and Amazonas)", and M. r. rufipennis "locally in southeastern Peru (San Martín to Puno)".

The Roraiman flycatcher inhabits humid to wet forest on tepuis in Venezuela, Guyana, and Brazil, where it tends to favor the forest's understory to mid-story. Hilty states that in elevation there it ranges between 900 and 2,000 m (3,000 and 6,600 ft) but mostly between 1,300 and 1,800 m (4,300 and 5,900 ft) and only to about 550 m (1,800 ft) on the Brazilian side of Cerro de la Neblina. However, van Perlo states that it ranges between 500 and 2,000 m (1,600 and 6,600 ft) in Brazil. In the Andes from Colombia to Bolivia it primarily inhabits subtropical forest on sandy or other nutrient-poor soils and along ridges, and also favors the forest's understory to mid-story. In Colombia it occurs below 250 m (800 ft), in Ecuador between 1,400 and 1,700 m (4,600 and 5,600 ft), and in Peru between 900 and 1,800 m (3,000 and 5,900 ft).

== Behavior ==
=== Movement ===
The Roraiman flycatcher is a year-round resident.

=== Feeding ===
The Roraiman flycatcher feeds on arthropods. It typically forages alone or in pairs, usually in the forest's understory to mid-story. It seldom joins mixed-species feeding flocks. When perched it has an erect posture. It takes prey in mid-air and from foliage, twigs, and the ground with short flights from a perch.

=== Breeding ===
Nothing is known about the Roraiman flycatcher's breeding biology.

=== Vocalization ===
What may be either the song or a call of the Roraiman flycatcher in Ecuador is "an explosive and buzzy series of sputtered 'tschew' notes, rising and then descending" that has been written as "TSEW! TSI pit-pit TSI'TSI'tsi-tew". It also makes "softer sharp 'pit' or 'tschit' " notes that can be doubled or become a trill.

== Status ==
The IUCN has assessed the Roraiman flycatcher as being of Least Concern. It has a large range; its population size is not known and is believed to be decreasing. No immediate threats have been identified. It is considered rare and local in Colombia, Ecuador, and Peru. It is considered fairly common to common on the higher tepuis in Venezuela but there are few records in Brazil. It occurs in several protected areas.
