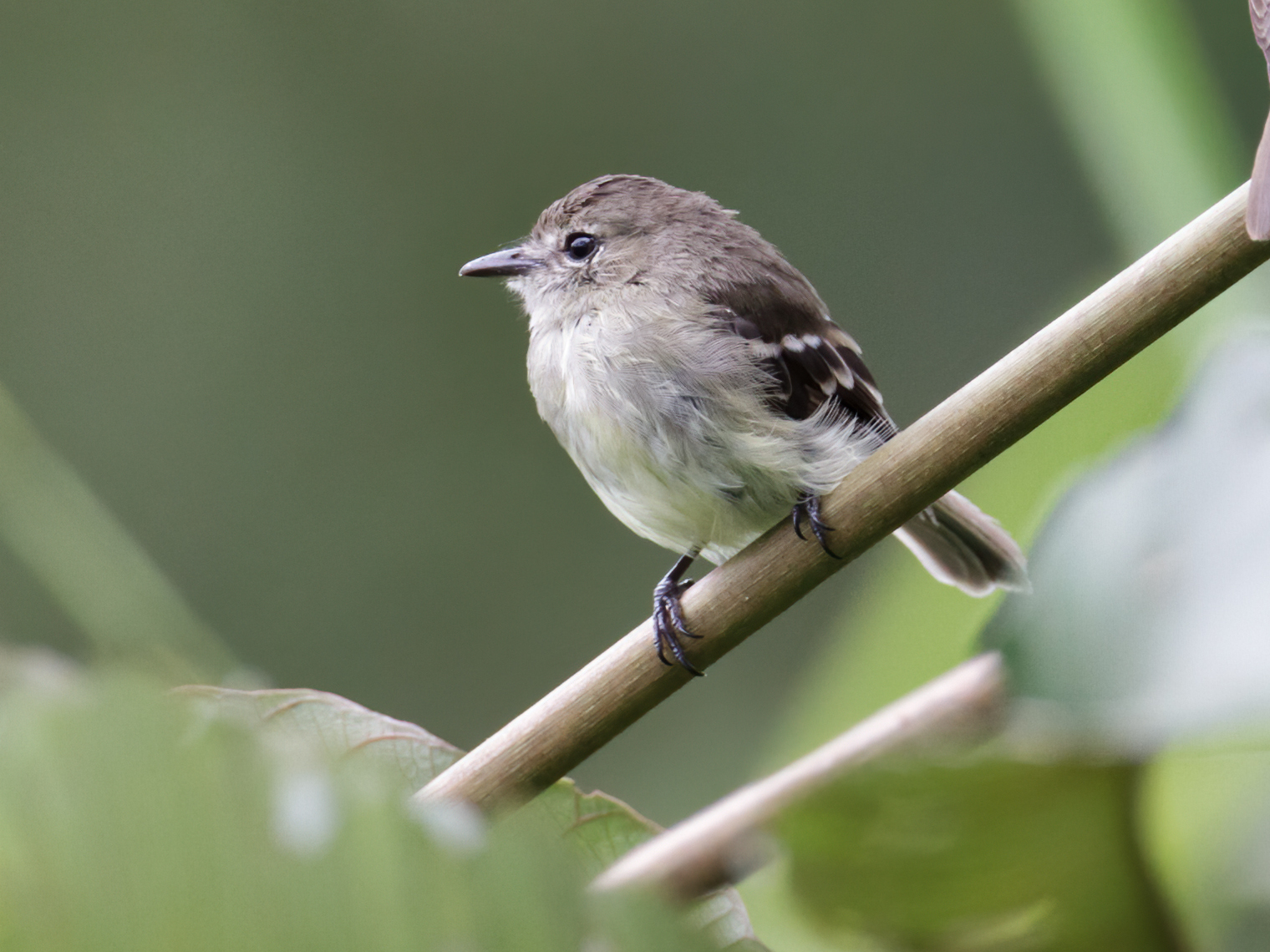
- Olive-chested flycatcher seen in Napo Province, Ecuador

Conservation status
- Least Concern (IUCN 3.1)

Scientific classification
- Kingdom: Animalia
- Phylum: Chordata
- Class: Aves
- Order: Passeriformes
- Family: Tyrannidae
- Genus: Myiophobus
- Species: M. cryptoxanthus

Binomial name
- Myiophobus cryptoxanthus (Sclater, PL, 1861)

= Olive-chested flycatcher =

Species of bird

The olive-chested flycatcher (Myiophobus cryptoxanthus) is a species of bird in the family Tyrannidae, the tyrant flycatchers. It is found in Ecuador and Peru.

== Taxonomy and systematics ==
The olive-chested flycatcher was originally described by English ornithologist Philip Sclater in 1861 as Myiobius cryptoxanthus, from specimens collected by Louis Fraser in Gualaquiza and Zamora in Ecuador. Its specific epithet cryptoxanthus comes from the Greek kryptos and xanthos, meaning hidden and yellow respectively, and apparently refers to its crown patch.

The olive-chested flycatcher was considered a subspecies of the bran-colored flycatcher (M. fasciatus) by Cory & Hellmayr in 1927 under the name Sclater's banded flycatcher. The olive-chested and bran-colored flycatchers form a superspecies, and some authors have suggested that the two should be assigned their own genus.

The olive-chested flycatcher is monotypic.

== Description ==
The olive-chested flycatcher is about 12 cm (4.7 in) long and weighs about 8.5 to 11 g (0.30 to 0.39 oz). The sexes have almost identical plumage. Adult males have a dull olive-brown crown with a partially hidden yellow patch in the middle. Females have a smaller patch than males. Both sexes have dark lores, a whitish line over them, and a thin whitish broken eye-ring on an otherwise dark olive face. Their back and rump are dark olive. Their wings are dusky with whitish buff tips of the wing coverts that show as two wing bars. Their tail is dusky. Their throat is dirty white. Their breast is heavily streaked with grayish olive that extends onto the flanks. Their belly and vent are pale yellow. They have a dark iris and black legs and feet. One source states that their bill is all black; the type specimen had a "carnea" (fleshy) mandible.

== Distribution ==
The olive-chested flycatcher was originally known from Ecuador. It now is known along the entire eastern slope of the Andes of Ecuador from Sucumbíos Province and into northeastern Peru's Cajamarca, Amazonas, Loreto, and San Martín departments. It inhabits somewhat open landscapes like shrubby clearings and pastures, secondary woodland, and the edges of heavier forest. In elevation it occurs mostly between 400 and 1,400 m (1,300 and 4,600 ft) in Ecuador and 900 and 1,750 m (3,000 and 5,700 ft) in Peru. These elevations are slightly higher than the related bran-colored flycatcher.

== Behavior ==
=== Movement ===
The olive-chested flycatcher is a year-round resident.

=== Feeding ===
The olive-chested flycatcher feeds on arthropods and probably also on small berries. It typically forages alone or in pairs, usually in the forest's understory, and is not known to join mixed-species feeding flocks. When perched it has an erect posture. It takes prey from foliage and twigs while perched and with short flights to hover-glean.

=== Breeding ===
Nothing is known about the olive-chested flycatcher's breeding biology.

=== Vocalization ===
The olive-chested flycatcher's song is "an evenly spaced series of rich dewp or wheep notes sometimes interspersed with chattered phrases: dji'dji'dji-wheep dji'dji'dji-wheep dji'dji'dji-wheep". Its call is "a rapid, rich, rising errr'djidjidjidjidjidjidji?". Other descriptions are "an endlessly repeated 'chwee...whwee...chwee...' " song and "a sprightly 'weee d'd'd'd'd'd'd?' " call.

== Status ==
The IUCN has assessed the olive-chested flycatcher as being of Least Concern. It has a large range; its population size is not known and is believed to be increasing. No immediate threats have been identified. It is considered "numerous" in Ecuador and uncommon to locally fairly common in Peru. It occurs in some protected areas in Ecuador.
