= Bran-colored flycatcher =

Conservation status
- Least Concern (IUCN 3.1)

Scientific classification
- Kingdom: Animalia
- Phylum: Chordata
- Class: Aves
- Order: Passeriformes
- Family: Tyrannidae
- Genus: Myiophobus
- Species: M. fasciatus

Binomial name
- Myiophobus fasciatus (Müller, 1776)

Species of bird

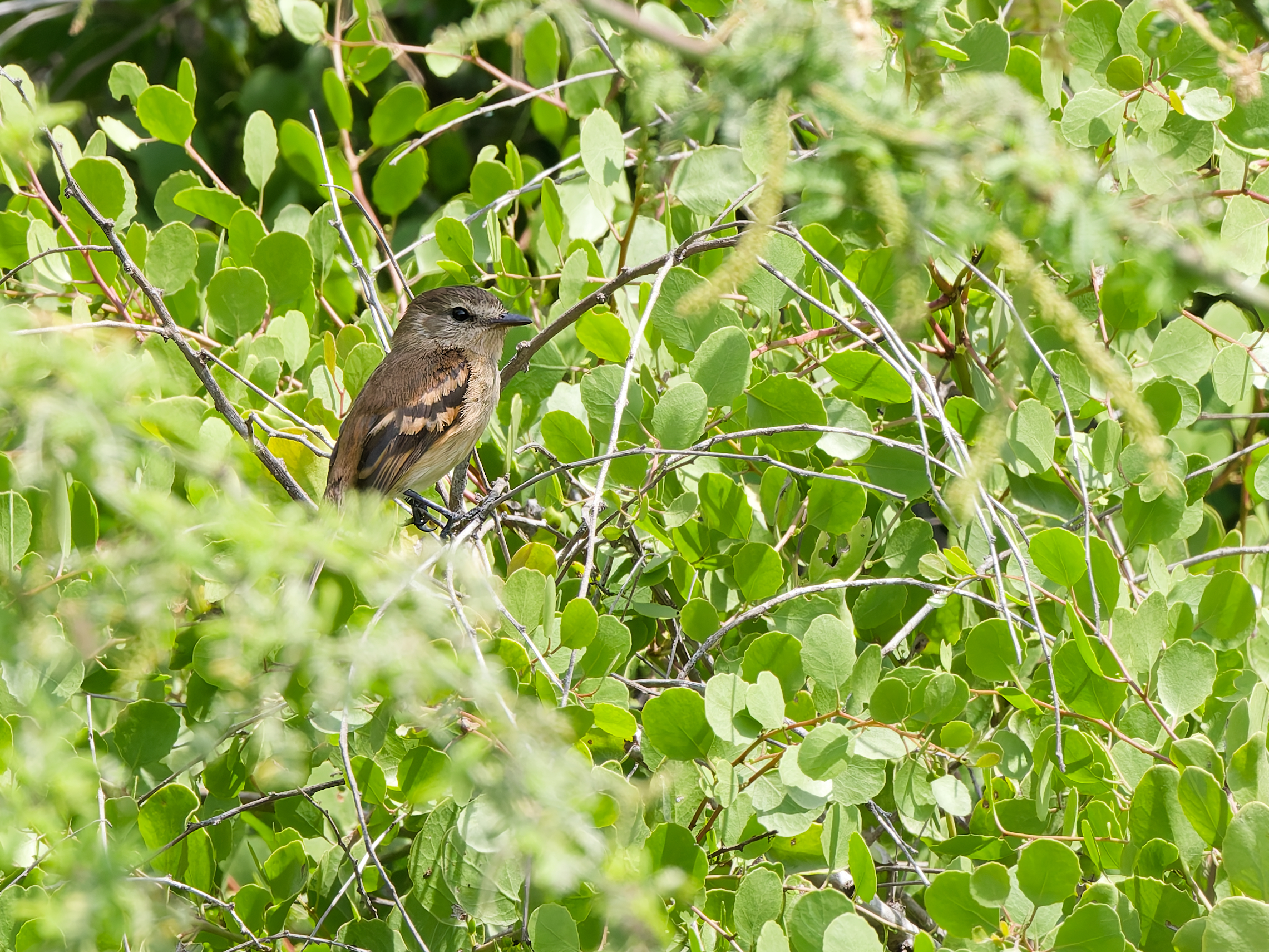
Bran-coloured flycatcher

The bran-colored flycatcher (Myiophobus fasciatus) is a small passerine bird in the tyrant flycatcher family. It is found in Costa Rica and Panama, on Trinidad, and in every mainland South American country except Chile.

== Taxonomy and systematics ==
The bran-colored flycatcher has these five subspecies:

- Myiophobus fasciatus furfurosus (Thayer & Bangs, 1905)
- Myiophobus fasciatus fasciatus (Müller, PLS, 1776)
- Myiophobus fasciatus saturatus (Berlepsch & Stolzmann, 1906)
- Myiophobus fasciatus auriceps (Gould & Gray, GR, 1839)
- Myiophobus fasciatus flammiceps (Temminck, 1822)

What are now the mouse-gray flycatcher (M. crypterythrus) and rufescent flycatcher (M. rufescens) were originally described as species but in the mid-twentieth century were reclassified as subspecies of the bran-colored flycatcher. Following studies that identified plumage and vocal differences among them, beginning in 2016 taxonomic systems began splitting them. Somewhat earlier, the olive-chested flycatcher (M. cryptoxanthus), which had also been described as a species and later merged into the bran-colored flycatcher, was again recognized as a full species. The two of them form a superspecies, and some authors have suggested that they should be assigned their own genus.

== Description ==
The bran-colored flycatcher is 11 to 14 cm (4.3 to 5.5 in) long and weighs 7.1 to 17 g (0.25 to 0.60 oz). The sexes very similar. Adult males of the nominate subspecies M. f. fasciatus have a reddish brown crown with a partly hidden yellow to orange-rufous patch in the middle. Both sexes have brown lores, a short yellowish white line above them, and a thin white eye-ring on an otherwise reddish brown face. Their back and rump are reddish brown. Their wings are dusky to dark brown with thin buff edges on the flight feathers and wide buff-white tips on the wing coverts; the latter show as two wing bars. Their tail is dark brown. Their throat and underparts are mostly dull white with short grayish brown streaks thickly on the breast and flanks. Their belly sometimes has a yellow tinge. Adult females have a much smaller crown patch or none at all and have less heavily streaked underparts than males.

All subspecies of the bran-colored flycatcher have a dark brown, cinnamon-brown, or brown iris and black legs and feet. Most have a black or blackish gray maxilla and a dark mandible with an orange-yellow, brownish pink, or pinkish gray base. The subspecies differ from the nominate and each other thus.

- M. f. furfurosus: richest reddish-brown upperparts of all subspecies; yellower belly than nominate, rufous-white wingbars, and orange-yellow or pinkish mandible
- M. f. saturatus: duller overall than nominate, with brown upperparts lacking rufous and a deeper yellow belly
- M. f. auriceps: darker brown upperparts and darker brown breast streaking than nominate and a white belly; in Brazil somewhat more buffy underparts and more cinnamon wing bars
- M. f. flammiceps: largest subspecies; warmer brown upperparts than the others with a white belly washed with yellow; pale mandible

== Distribution and habitat ==
The bran-colored flycatcher has a disjunct distribution. The subspecies are found thus:

- Myiophobus fasciatus furfurosus: from southern San José Province in southwestern Costa Rica south through Puntarenas Province into Panama just past the Canal Zone and on the Pearl Islands off Panama's Pacific coast
- Myiophobus fasciatus fasciatus: most of the length of the three ranges of the Colombian Andes; eastern Ecuador; Venezuela in the Serranía del Perijá, across most of the north, and western Amazonas and central Bolívar states (though probably throughout); coastally across the Guianas; northern Brazil in the states of Roraima, Amapá, and northernmost Pará
- Myiophobus fasciatus saturatus: Amazonian and east Andean foothills Peru between San Martín and Cusco departments
- Myiophobus fasciatus auriceps: southeastern Peru, Acre state in western Brazil, northern and eastern Bolivia, western Paraguay, and Argentina south to Buenos Aires Province
- Myiophobus fasciatus flammiceps: approximately the eastern half of Brazil; eastern Paraguay; Uruguay; northeastern Argentina

The bran-colored flycatcher inhabits a variety of landscapes across its wide range. In general they are somewhat open and include the interior and edges of dry forest, brushy savanna and pastures, and thickets along watercourses in arid areas. It also inhabits successional vegetation on riverbanks and islands and the Llanos of Colombia and Venezuela. In elevation it occurs between 700 and 1,250 m (2,300 and 4,100 ft) in Central America, between 600 and 2,000 m (2,000 and 6,600 ft) in Colombia, up to 1,700 m (5,600 ft) north of the Orinoco River and to 1,200 m (3,900 ft) south of it in Venezuela, between 300 and 1,100 m (1,000 and 3,600 ft) in Ecuador, up to 1,800 m (5,900 ft) in Peru, and from sea level to 1,500 m (4,900 ft) in Brazil.

== Behavior ==
=== Movement ===
The bran-colored flycatcher is a year-round resident in the northern and central parts of its range. Populations south of central Bolivia, Paraguay, Uruguay, and southeastern Brazil migrate north for the non-breeding season. Subspecies M. f. auriceps moves to eastern Peru and M. f. flammiceps to northern Brazil. The species is almost entirely a non-breeding visitor to Peru though some are thought to breed locally there.

=== Feeding ===
The bran-colored flycatcher's diet has not been detailed but is known to be primarily insects and a lesser amount of small berries. It typically forages singly or in pairs within about 2 m (7 ft) of the ground and seldom joins mixed-species feeding flocks. When perched it has an erect posture. It takes prey from foliage and twigs while perched and with short flights to hover-glean.

=== Breeding ===
The bran-colored flycatcher's breeding season varies geographically. It breeds between March and June in Central America and northern Venezuela, between March and November on Trinidad, August to October in Colombia, May to February in northern Brazil, and October to January or February in southern Brazil and Argentina. Its nest is a deep cup made from a wide variety of plant fibers held together with spider web; sometimes green moss or feathers are incorporated. Usually only the female builds the nest. It is typically placed in a branch fork, though also in bamboo, and within a few meters of the ground. The usual clutch is two eggs though clutches of one and three are known. The eggs have a background of ochre, cream, pinkish white, or pale brown with a wreath of various shades of brown, red-brown, or gray at the large end. The female alone incubates with a typical period of 14 to 17 days. Fledging occurs 13 to 17 days after hatch. Both parents provision nestlings and fledglings. Nests are known to be parasitized by the shiny cowbird (Molothrus bonariensis) in Argentina.

=== Vocalization ===
The bran-colored flycatcher's vocalizations appear to geographically vary somewhat. In Costa Rica it makes "a whistled whee, whee, whee...". In Venezuela its dawn song is "a husky, whistled tep, chew-e" that is repeated over and over. During the day it makes a "short, squeezed wee'he 'he'he'e, nasal, almost rattlelike". In Peru it sings "a repetitive series of rich notes: tchew...weet...tchee'wit...tchew...weet...". The species typically sings from a low perch in the open.

== Status ==
The IUCN has assessed the bran-colored flycatcher as being of Least Concern. It has an extremely large range; its population size is not known and is believed to be increasing. No immediate threats have been identified. It is considered fairly common in Costa Rica, common in most of Colombia but rarer in the east, "common but somewhat local" in Venezuela, rare in Ecuador, and fairly common in Peru. It occurs in many protected areas and "appears to thrive in shrubby successional vegetation that follows deforestation".
