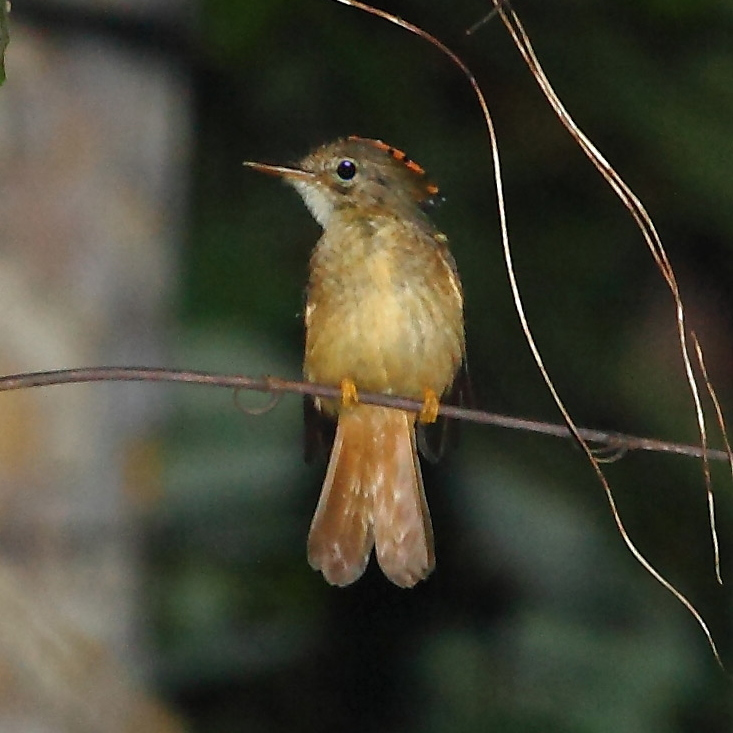
- "Amazonian" tropical royal flycatcher at Apiacás, Mato Grosso state, Brasil

Scientific classification
- Kingdom: Animalia
- Phylum: Chordata
- Class: Aves
- Order: Passeriformes
- Family: Onychorhynchidae
- Genus: Onychorhynchus; Fischer von Waldheim, 1810

= Royal flycatcher =

Genus of birds

The royal flycatchers are a genus, Onychorhynchus, of passerine birds that most taxonomic systems place in family Onychorhynchidae. The members are found in Mexico, Central America, and much of South America.

== Names ==
The genus name Onychorhynchus comes from the Greek words ὄνῠξ ónŭx "nail" and ῥῠ́γχος rhŭ́nkhos "bill". The specific epithet of the type species, coronatus, and the common name royal flycatcher, refer to the striking, colorful crest, which is seen displayed very rarely, except after mating, while preening, in courtship as well as being handled.

== Taxonomy and systematics ==
For many years the IOC and BirdLife International's Handbook of the Birds of the World (HBW) placed four species in genus Onychorhynchus. In 2024 the IOC combined ("lumped") the northern, Amazonian, and Pacific royal flycatchers as a single species, the tropical royal flycatcher (O. coronatus), leaving the Atlantic royal flycatcher (O. swainsoni) unchanged.

The taxonomies of the genus and of the family Tityridae remain unsettled. The Clements taxonomy recognizes the same two species of royal flycatcher as the IOC. In 2024 Clements placed them and five other species in family Onychorhynchidae and the IOC followed suit in early 2025. The North American and South American Classification Committees of the American Ornithological Society (AOS) treat genus Onychorhynchus as having one species, the royal flycatcher (O. coronatus sensu lato), with multiple subspecies. Like the IOC and Clements, the AOS committees place the royal flycatcher in family Onychorhynchidae. (The South American committee is seeking a proposal for reevaluation of the taxa.) However, HBW retains the four-species treatment and also retains them in family Tityridae where the IOC and Clements had earlier placed them.

As of early 2025 the IOC and Clements recognize these two species in genus Onychorhynchus.

Image	Scientific name	Common name	Distribution
	Onychorhynchus coronatus	Tropical royal flycatcher	Southern Mexico through Central America, western Colombia, western Ecuador, and the Amazon Basin in northern Bolivia, eastern Peru, eastern Ecuador, eastern Colombia, Venezuela, the Guianas, and northern and western Brazil
	Onychorhynchus swainsoni	Atlantic royal flycatcher	Atlantic forest in southeastern Brazil
