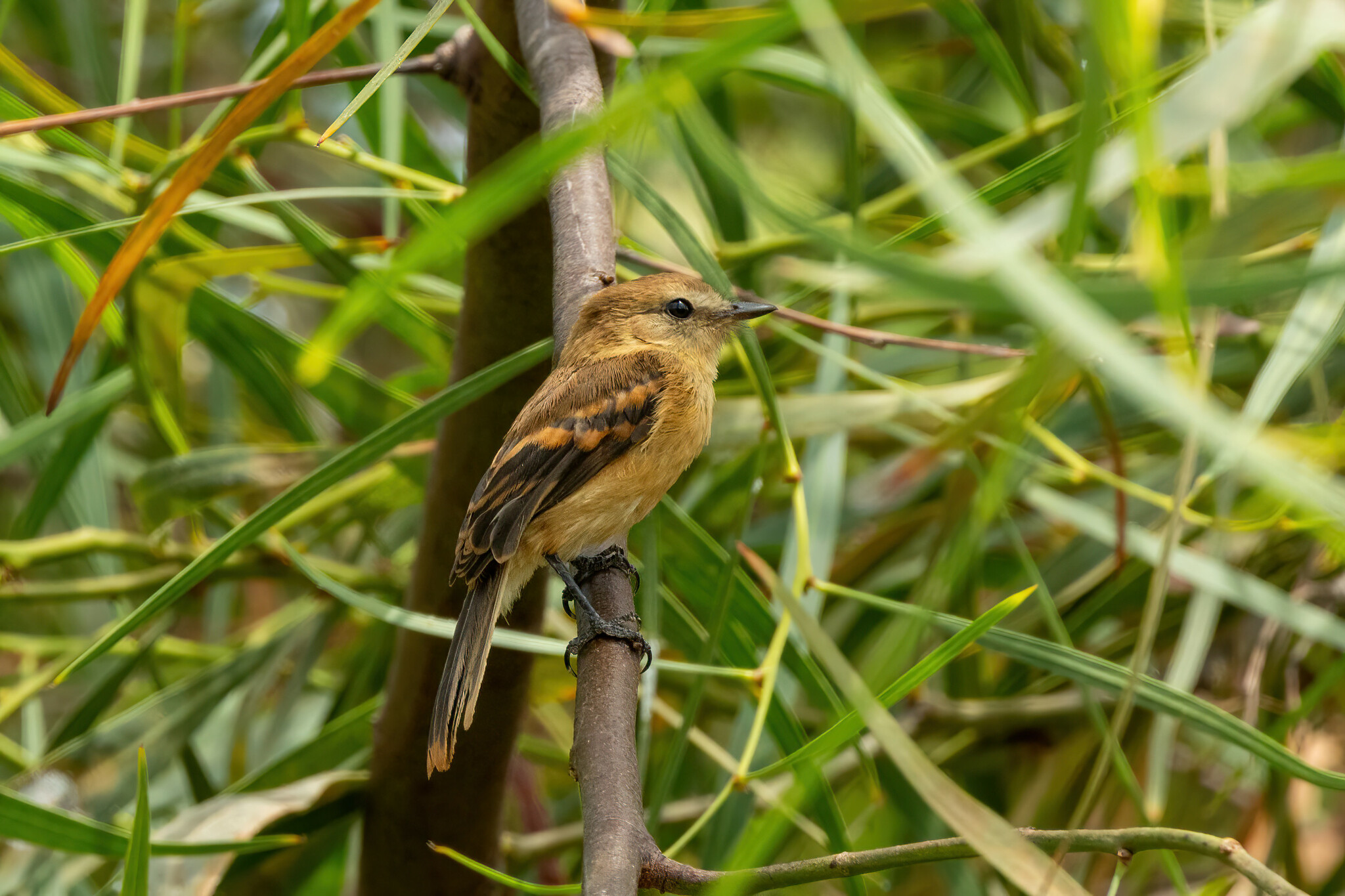

Conservation status
- Least Concern (IUCN 3.1)

Scientific classification
- Kingdom: Animalia
- Phylum: Chordata
- Class: Aves
- Order: Passeriformes
- Family: Tyrannidae
- Genus: Myiophobus
- Species: M. rufescens

Binomial name
- Myiophobus rufescens (Salvadori, 1864)

= Rufescent flycatcher =

Species of bird

The rufescent flycatcher (Myiophobus rufescens) is a species of bird in the family Tyrannidae, the tyrant flycatchers. It is found in Chile and Peru.

== Taxonomy and systematics ==
The rufescent flycatcher was originally described as Myiobius rufescens. In the mid-twentieth century it was reclassified as a subspecies of the bran-colored flycatcher (Myiophobus fasciatus). Following studies that identified plumage and vocal differences among the subspecies, beginning in 2016 taxonomic systems began splitting them.

The rufescent flycatcher is monotypic.

== Description ==
The rufescent flycatcher is 11.5 to 12.5 cm (4.5 to 4.9 in) long. The sexes very similar. Adult males have a brown crown with a partly hidden orange-buff patch in the middle. Both sexes have brown lores and a short warm buff supercilium on an otherwise warm brown face. Their back and rump are warm brown. Their wings are dark brown with rufous-buff edges on the flight feathers and wide rufous-buff tips on the wing coverts; the latter show as two wing bars. Their tail is dark brown. Their throat and underparts are peachy-buff cinnamon that is lightest on the throat and upper breast. Adult females have a much smaller crown patch or none at all. Both sexes have a brown iris, a black bill with an orange-yellow base to the mandible, and black legs and feet.

== Distribution and habitat ==
The rufescent flycatcher is found from southern Lambayeque Department in northwestern Peru south along the coast through the rest of the country and slightly into extreme northern Chile's Arica y Parinacota Region. It inhabits rather open landscapes including the edges of forest, secondary woodlands, pastures, and desert scrublands. In elevation it ranges from sea level to 2,700 m (8,900 ft) in Peru but only to about 500 m (1,600 ft) in Chile.

== Behavior ==
=== Movement ===
The rufescent flycatcher is a year-round resident.

=== Feeding ===
The rufescent flycatcher's diet and feeding behavior have not been studied. They are assumed to be similar to those of the bran-colored flycatcher, which see here.

=== Breeding ===
Nothing is known about the rufescent flycatcher's breeding biology.

=== Vocalization ===
The rufescent flycatcher's dawn song has not been described. Its calls include a "slightly metallic, nasal chieh or tseek, uttered either singly or in series" and a "rattled series of identical notes with a total duration of ⁓0.7‒2.0 [seconds]". Often a pair vocalizes in duet with each making one of the calls.

== Status ==
The IUCN has assessed the rufescent flycatcher as being of Least Concern. Its population size is not known and is believed to be stable. No immediate threats have been identified. It is considered fairly common in Peru and rare in Chile.
