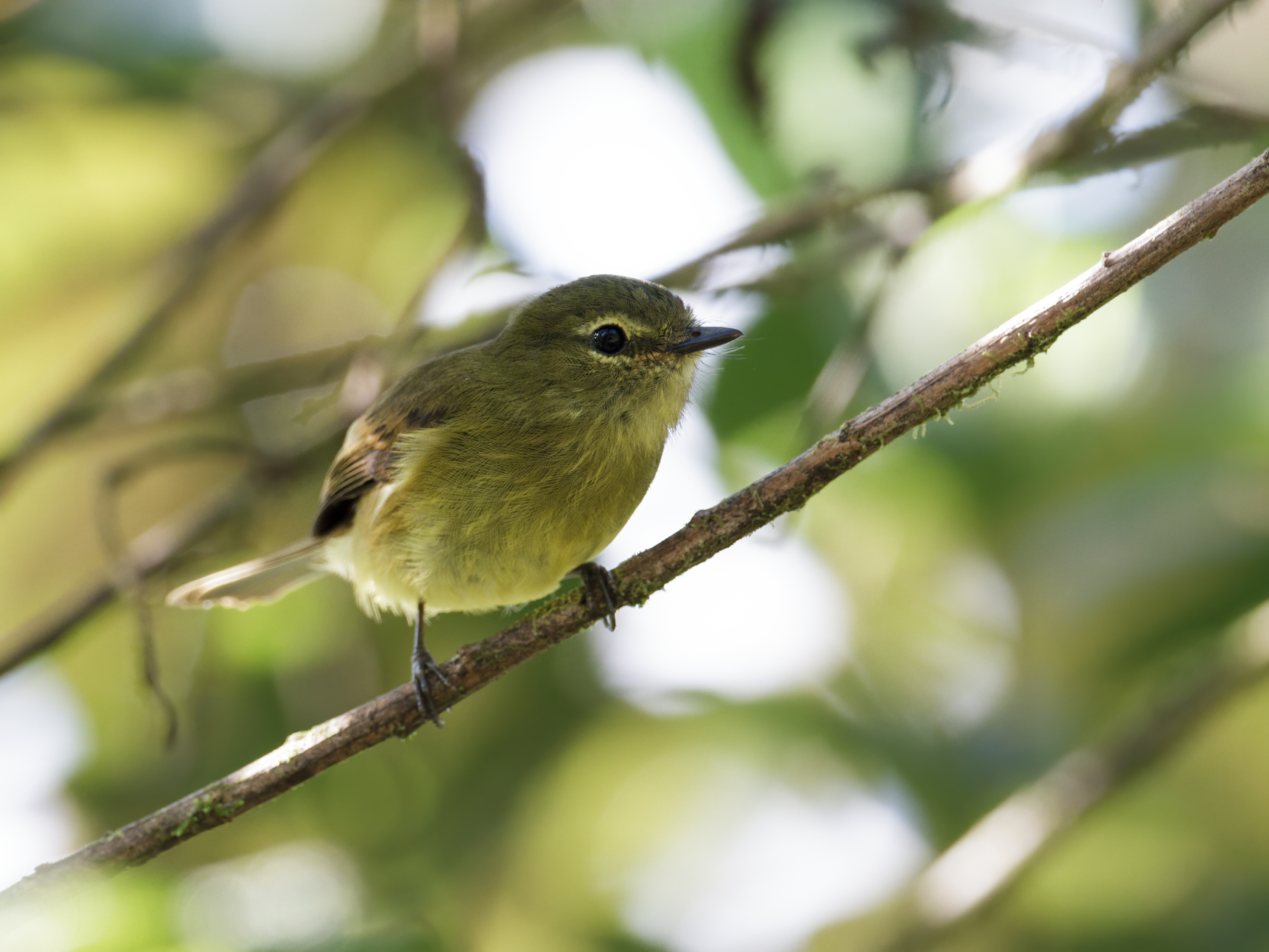

Scientific classification
- Kingdom: Animalia
- Phylum: Chordata
- Class: Aves
- Order: Passeriformes
- Family: Tyrannidae
- Genus: Myiophobus
- Species: M. flavicans

Binomial name
- Myiophobus flavicans (Sclater, PL, 1861)

Synonyms
- Myiobius flavicans

= Flavescent flycatcher =

Species of bird

The flavescent flycatcher (Myiophobus flavicans) is a species of bird in the family Tyrannidae, the tyrant flycatchers. It is found in Colombia, Ecuador, Peru, and Venezuela.

== Taxonomy and systematics ==
The flavescent flycatcher was originally described as Myiobius flavicans.

The flavescent flycatcher has these five subspecies:

- M. f. flavicans (Sclater, PL, 1861)
- M. f. perijanus Phelps, WH & Phelps, WH Jr, 1957
- M. f. venezuelanus (Hellmayr, 1920)
- M. f. caripensis Zimmer, JT & Phelps, WH, 1954
- M. f. superciliosus (Taczanowski, 1875)

== Description ==
The flavescent flycatcher is 12 to 13 cm (4.7 to 5.1 in) long and weighs 10.2 to 12.9 g (0.36 to 0.46 oz). The sexes have almost identical plumage. Adult males of the nominate subspecies M. f. flavicans have an olive crown with a mostly hidden yellow or orange patch in the middle. Females do not have this patch. Both sexes have a yellowish line above the lores and thin yellowish broken eye-ring on an otherwise olive face. Their back and rump are olive. Their wings are dusky with cinnamon edges on the flight feathers and cinnamon to ochraceous tips of the wing coverts; the latter show as two or three wing bars. Their tail is dusky with buffy olive edges to the feathers. Their throat and underparts are yellow that is brightest on their belly; the breast has faint olive streaks. All subspecies have a dark iris and black legs and feet. They have a somewhat broad bill. One source states it has a black maxilla and a brownish to dusky pinkish mandible. Others say that the bill is all black.

The other subspecies of the flavescent flycatcher differ from the nominate and each other thus:

- M. f. venezuelanus: smaller and always yellow crown patch; less olive on the breast than nominate; pinkish mandible
- M. f. caripensis: like venezuelanus but with brighter yellow breast with even less olive
- M. f. perijanus: like venezuelanus but with an all black bill
- M. f. superciliosus: yellower lores and eye-ring than nominate with one thin cinnamon wing bar, dull brown edges on the flight feathers, and all black bill

== Distribution and habitat ==
The subspecies of the flavescent flycatcher are found thus:

- M. f. flavicans: all three ranges of the Colombian Andes and south on both Andean slopes through Ecuador into northern Peru as far as the Marañón River
- M. f. perijanus: Venezuela in the Serranía del Perijá and in the Andes of southern Táchira state
- M. f. venezuelanus: Venezuela in the Andes from northern Táchira to Lara and in the Coastal Ranges from Yaracuy east to Miranda
- M. f. caripensis: Venezuela in western Sucre and northern Monagas states
- M. f. superciliosus: eastern slope of Peruvian Andes from the Marañón south to Cuzco Department

The flavescent flycatcher primarily inhabits the interior and edges of humid to wet forest in the subtropical and lower temperate zones. In some areas it favors stands of bamboo. In elevation it ranges between 1,500 and 2,800 m (4,900 and 9,200 ft) in Colombia, between 1,300 and 2,500 m (4,300 and 8,200 ft) in Ecuador, between 1,500 and 2,300 m (4,900 and 7,500 ft) and locally to 3,000 m (9,800 ft) in Peru, and between 900 and 2,300 m (3,000 and 7,500 ft) though mostly above 1,300 m (4,300 ft) in Venezuela.

== Behavior ==
=== Movement ===
The flavescent flycatcher is a year-round resident.

=== Feeding ===
The flavescent flycatcher feeds on arthropods. It typically forages alone or in pairs, usually from the forest's understory into its mid-story. It seldom joins mixed-species feeding flocks. When perched it has an erect posture. It takes prey in mid-air and from foliage, twigs, and the ground with short flights from a perch.

=== Breeding ===
The flavescent flycatcher's breeding season has not been defined but includes February and June in different parts of Venezuela and multiple months from February to October in Colombia. Its nest is a small cup made from twigs and vines lined with feathers. The clutch size, incubation period, time to fledging, and details of parental care are not known.

=== Vocalization ===
The flavescent flycatcher is not greatly vocal. Its song is described as "a fast rhythmic series of 5–8 'kawhik' notes". Its calls include "a sharp 'chiyp' ", "an explosive, tinny, sharp tsew!", and "a sharp tsink".

== Status ==
The IUCN has assessed the flavescent flycatcher as being of Least Concern. It has a large range; its population size is not known and is believed to be decreasing. No immediate threats have been identified. It is considered common in Colombia and fairly common in Peru and Venezuela. It is found in several protected areas.
