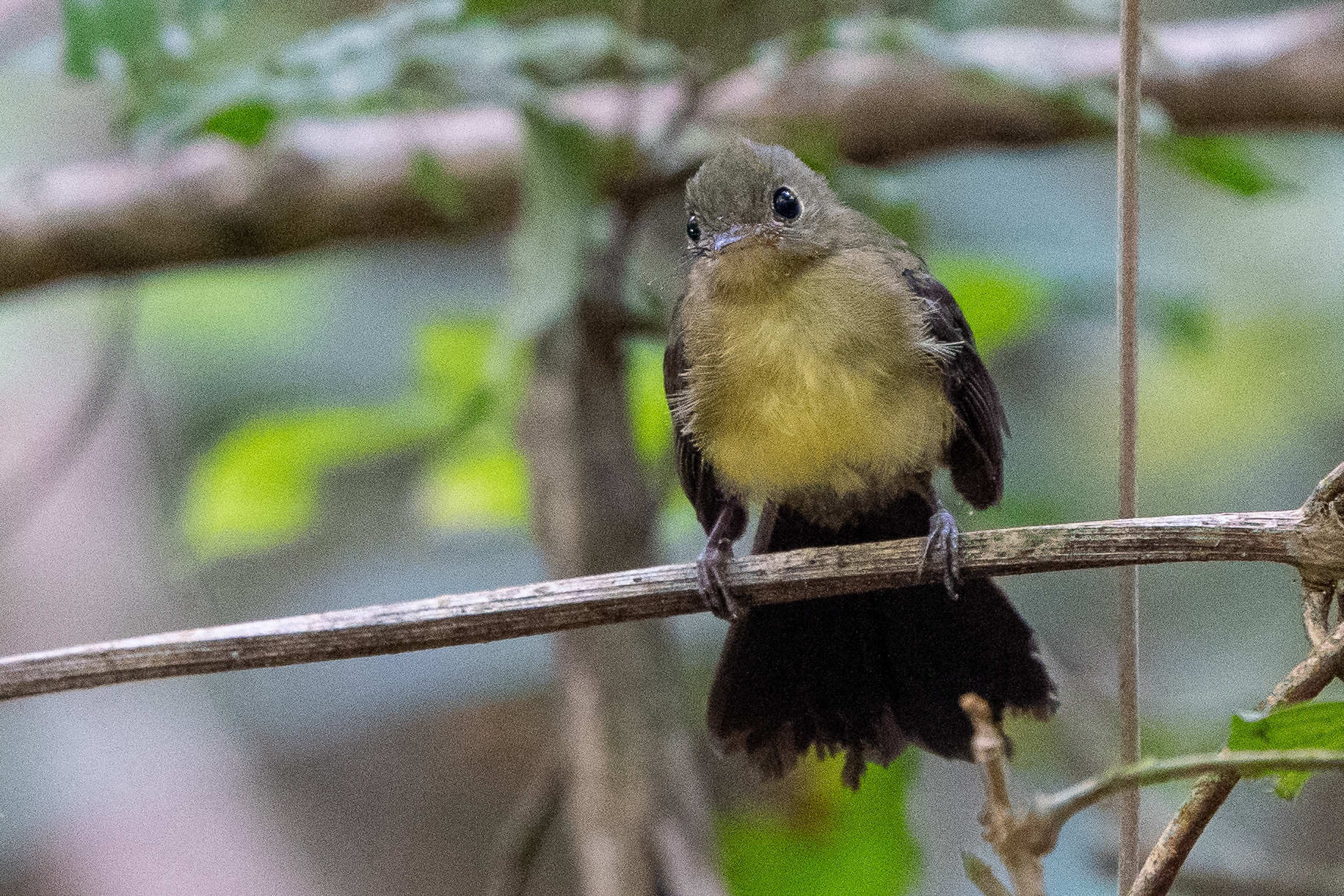

Conservation status
- Least Concern (IUCN 3.1)

Scientific classification
- Kingdom: Animalia
- Phylum: Chordata
- Class: Aves
- Order: Passeriformes
- Family: Onychorhynchidae
- Genus: Myiobius
- Species: M. sulphureipygius

Binomial name
- Myiobius sulphureipygius (Sclater, PL, 1857)

= Sulphur-rumped myiobius =

Species of bird

The sulphur-rumped myiobius or sulphur-rumped flycatcher (Myiobius sulphureipygius) is a species of passerine bird in the family Onychorhynchidae. It is found in Belize, Colombia, Costa Rica, Ecuador, Guatemala, Honduras, Mexico, Nicaragua, and Panama. Its natural habitat is subtropical or tropical moist lowland forests.

This flycatcher measures 12 cm (4.7 in). It has an olive-brown head and upper back, blackish wings and tail, and a tawny breast and sides. The face and eye ring are grey while the throat is whitish. The namesake rump patch is light yellow and extends to the mid-back. The belly is also yellow, as is a small crest.

Often found near streams, the sulphur-rumped myiobius participates in mixed-species flocks that move through the lower levels of the forest.

This bird often displays its rump patch by fanning its tail and dropping its wings. Its call is a sharp psit.
