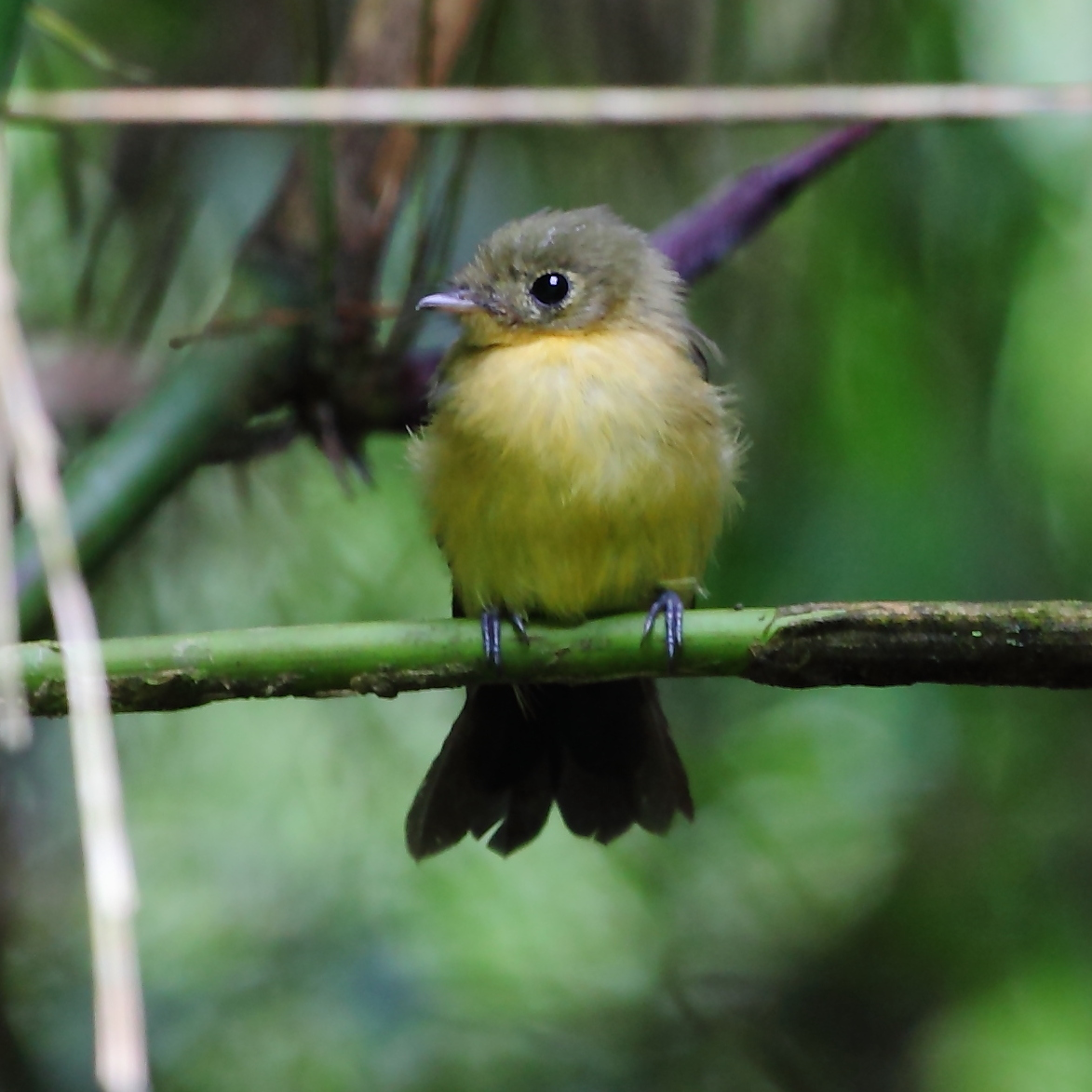
- Black-tailed myiobius (Myiobius atricaudus)

Scientific classification
- Kingdom: Animalia
- Phylum: Chordata
- Class: Aves
- Order: Passeriformes
- Family: Onychorhynchidae
- Genus: Myiobius; Gray, GR, 1839

Type species
- Muscicapa barbata Gmelin, JF, 1789

= Myiobius =

Genus of birds

Myiobius is a genus of passerine birds in the family Onychorhynchidae. The genus was previously considered to belong to the Tyrannidae or Tityridae.

The genus Myiobius was erected in 1839 by George Robert Gray in the section on birds in The Zoology of the Voyage of H.M.S. Beagle under the Command of Captain Fizroy R.N., during the years 1832-1836. The type species is the whiskered myiobius.

The genus contains four species:

Image	Scientific name	Common name	Distribution
	Myiobius villosus	Tawny-breasted myiobius	Bolivia, Colombia, Ecuador, Panama, Peru, and Venezuela
	Myiobius sulphureipygius	Sulphur-rumped myiobius	Belize, Colombia, Costa Rica, Ecuador, Guatemala, Honduras, Mexico, Nicaragua, and Panama
	Myiobius barbatus	Whiskered myiobius	Brazil, Colombia, Ecuador, French Guiana, Guyana, Peru, Suriname, and Venezuela
	Myiobius atricaudus	Black-tailed myiobius	Brazil, Colombia, Costa Rica, Ecuador, Panama, Peru, and Venezuela.
