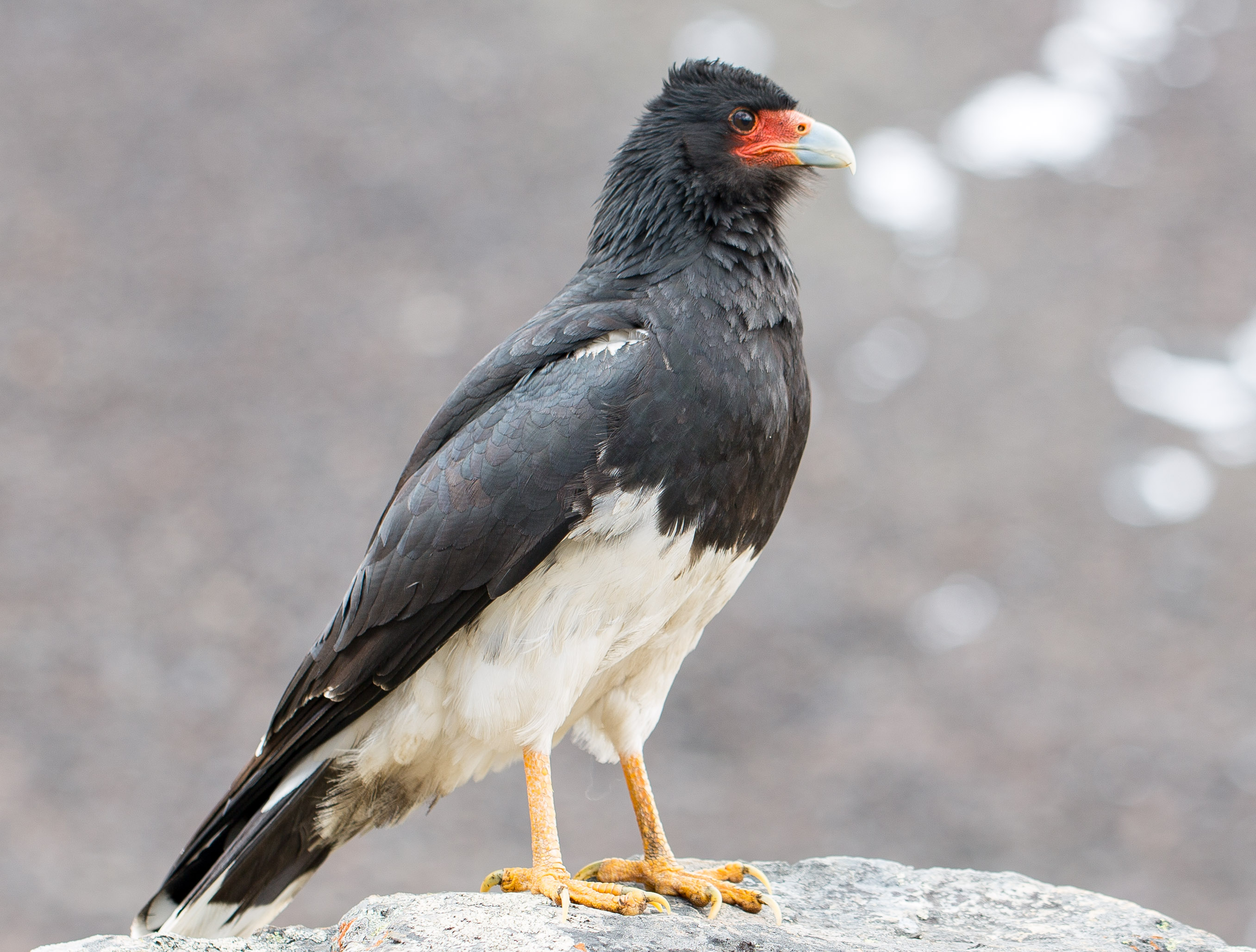
- Mountain caracara in the Cordillera Real, Bolivia

Conservation status
- Least Concern (IUCN 3.1)

Scientific classification
- Kingdom: Animalia
- Phylum: Chordata
- Class: Aves
- Order: Falconiformes
- Family: Falconidae
- Genus: Daptrius
- Species: D. megalopterus

Binomial name
- Daptrius megalopterus (Meyen, 1834)

Synonyms
- Aquila megaloptera Meyen 1834; Phalcoboenus megalopterus

= Mountain caracara =

Species of bird

The mountain caracara (Daptrius megalopterus), (Spanish: corequenque) is a species of bird of prey in the family Falconidae. It is found in puna and páramo in the Andes, ranging from northern Ecuador, through Peru and Bolivia, to northern Argentina and Chile. It is generally uncommon to fairly common. It resembles the closely related carunculated caracara and white-throated caracara, but unlike those species, its chest is uniform black. Juveniles are far less distinctive than the red-faced pied adults, being overall brown with dull pinkish-grey facial skin.

== Taxonomy ==
The mountain caracara was formally described and illustrated in 1834 by the Prussian naturalist Franz Meyen under the binomial name Aquila megaloptera based on specimens collect in the Cordillera of Chile. The specific epithet combines the Ancient Greek μεγαλως/megalōs meaning "exceedingly" with -πτερος/-pteros meaning "-winged". The species is monotypic: no subspecies are recognised. The mountain caracara was formerly placed in the genus Phalcoboenus. Molecular genetic studies found that the genus Milvago was polyphyletic with the chimango caracara sister to the genus Phalcoboenus and the yellow-headed caracara sister to the genus Daptrius. As the genetic divergence was relatively shallow, the polyphyly was resolved by expanding the genus Daptrius to include the species formerly placed in the genera Milvago and Phalcoboenus.

== Description ==
A medium-sized caracara with a faintly blue beak tip turning to bright orange, strongly contrasted by the jet-black feathers of its head, back and chest. Its rump, belly and upper tail and undertail coverts are pure white, changing sharply from black to white between the belly and chest. Its black wings have small white shoulder patches and it has white spots on some of its outer primaries. In the 1960s, 17 individual birds were caught and measured and it was noted that the species wing length could range from 358 to 403 mm, giving them a medium-sized wing for a caracara, but a comparatively short tail. Despite an important food source being carcasses, the mountain caracara's head and throat remain feathered (unlike some vultures), and only its lores are kept naked. Its legs are yellow and the males and females look similar, while the juveniles are brown.

== Distribution and habitat ==
Mountain caracaras are endemic to South America and are found throughout several countries, including Bolivia, Chile, Peru and Argentina. They prefer unforested regions where they can perch on power poles or fence posts to overlook a large area. They are usually grouped near cities and along highways.

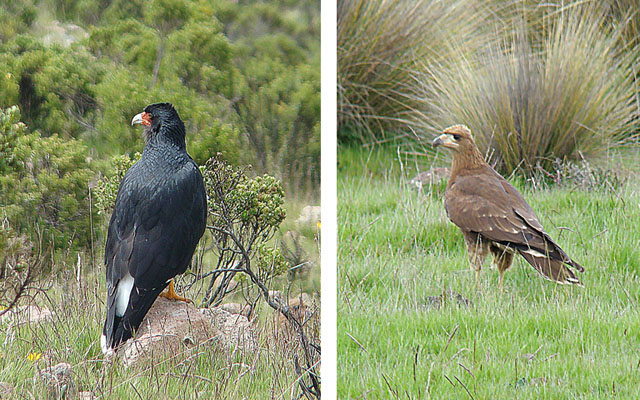
Mountain Caracara adult (left) and juvenile (right)

== Behaviour ==
=== Food and feeding ===
A highly opportunistic bird commonly seen walking on the ground, it feeds on both carrion and virtually any small animal it can catch. Those living in the high plains of northwestern Argentina seem to rely more heavily on animal carcasses as a food source, while some studied in the Andes of South Central Chile left pellets that were composed mostly of insect remains (up to 94%). These birds scratch and stamp at the dirt to scare up bugs from the ground and flip over rocks to find more arthropods and even rodents. Group foraging behaviour has been observed and several birds are able to overturn rocks that would be impossible for a single bird to move on its own. These groups are most often formed by a couple of adults and a juvenile that combine their efforts in search of food. Small birds, such as the plain-mantled tit-spinetail also fall prey to them. Lone caracaras were also recorded to follow human vehicles that would periodically throw out scraps of food. Being opportunistic feeders, they have adapted well to living near humans and are more concentrated near cities where they are more likely to be able to feast on carrion and refuse.

=== Breeding ===
The caracara species are unique among the family Falconidae in that they build their own nests of sticks, though these can range from a bare minimum of materials to quite a substantial amount; some nests consist merely of an empty cliff ledge while others are massive weaves of branches. Breeding season is from October to December and the nest will usually contain two eggs, and very rarely three, that hatch in December. The chicks have fledged and are independent by March, though they may stay with their parents for months afterward.

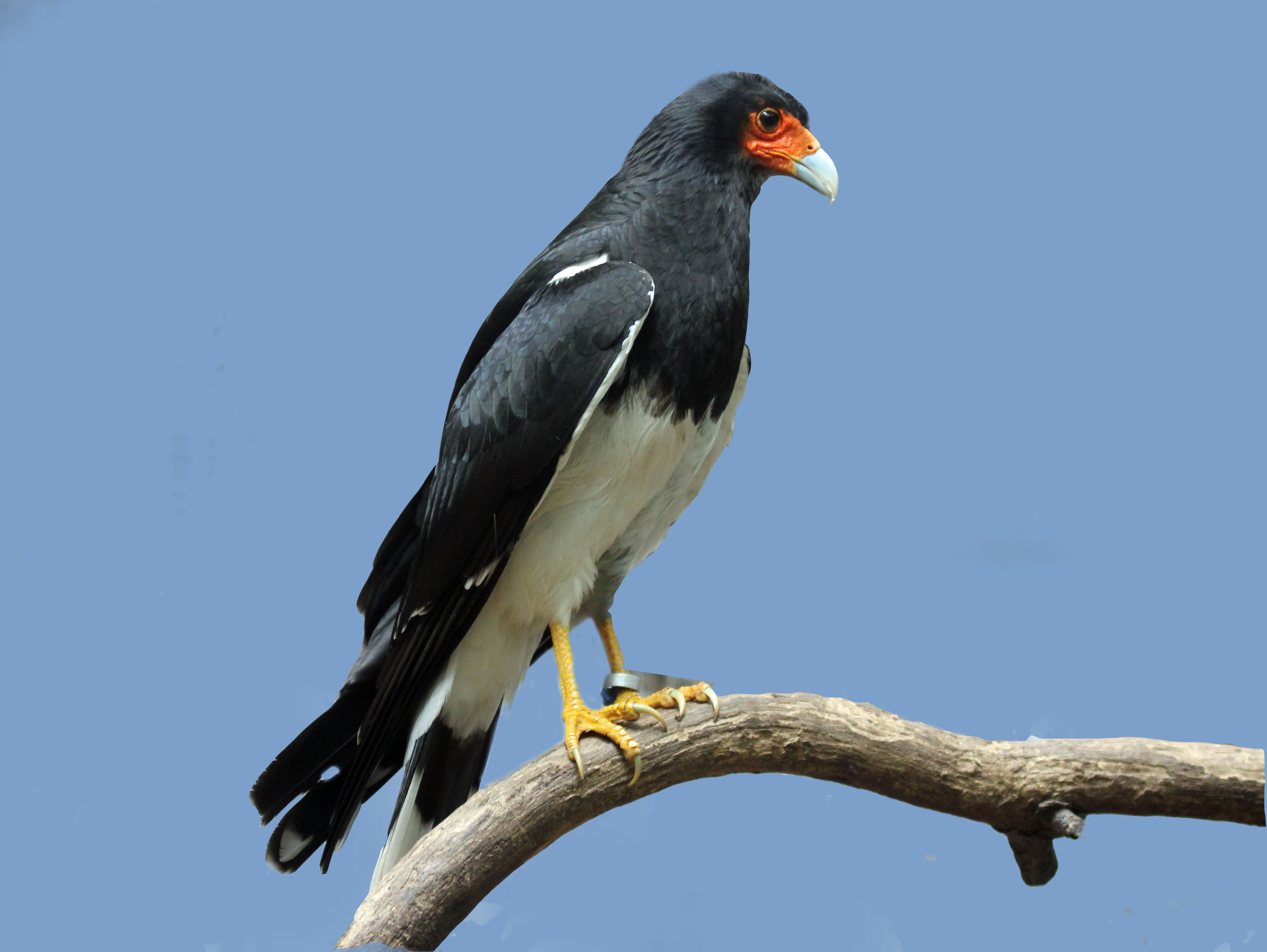
Mountain Caracara

=== Group Foraging ===
It is still unknown why some mountain caracaras use a group foraging method to hunt down food. Even though the hunting party may be able to overturn bigger rocks and cover more ground, the prey captured is usually not shared amongst the hunters and usually little to no benefit is received by the youngest in the group. The caracara that decides on the most likely rock to move is usually the bird who grabs and eats the prey, though if enough food is available, all members could potentially receive a meal at some point during their forage.

== Vocalizations ==
When group foraging, an adult who finds a rock worth turning over will call out to attract the rest of its nearby party. A flight call has also been recorded.

== Traditional use ==
The feathers were used to decorate the crown, or Mascapaicha, of the Sapa Inca.
