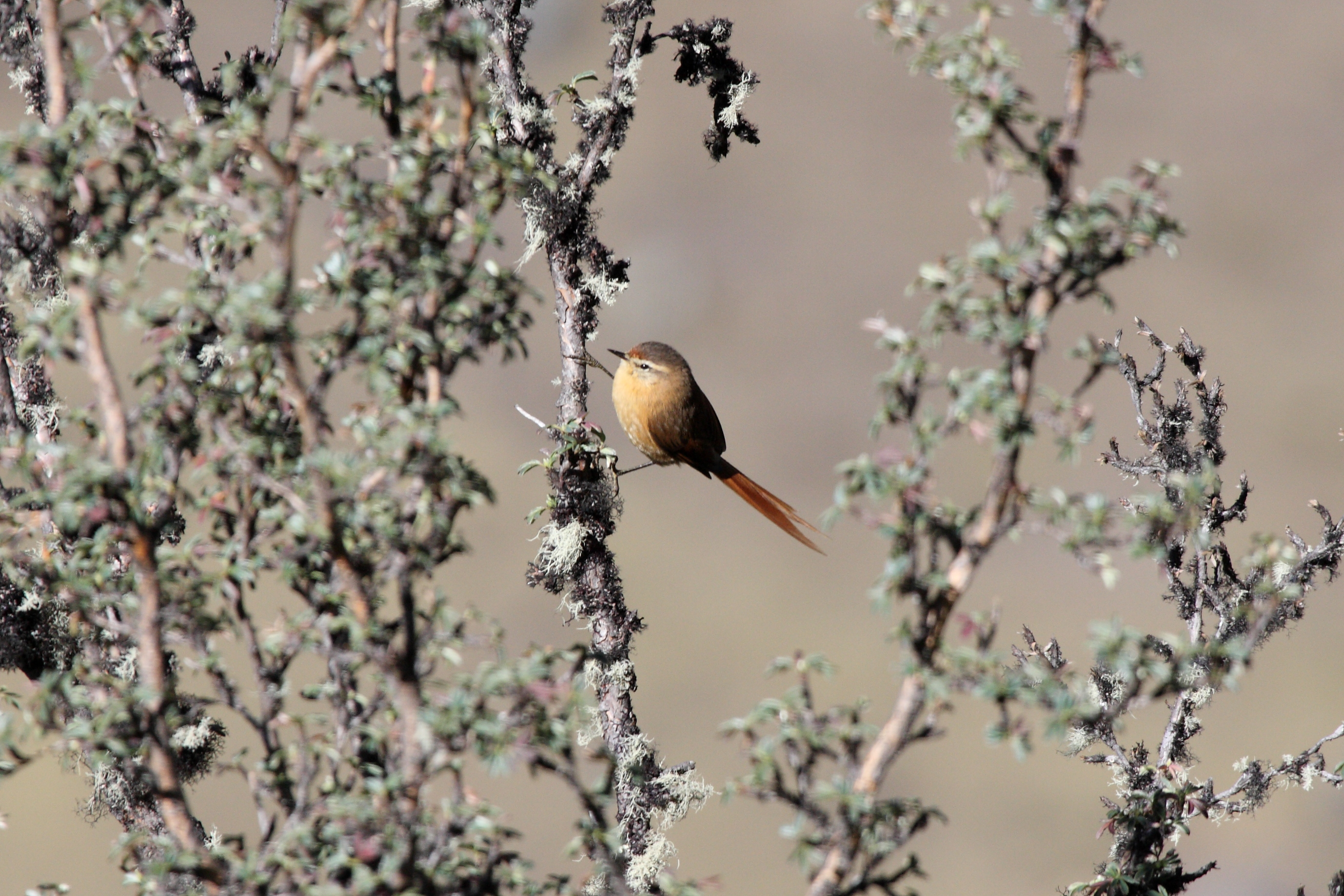

Conservation status
- Least Concern (IUCN 3.1)

Scientific classification
- Kingdom: Animalia
- Phylum: Chordata
- Class: Aves
- Order: Passeriformes
- Family: Furnariidae
- Genus: Sylviorthorhynchus
- Species: S. yanacensis

Binomial name
- Sylviorthorhynchus yanacensis (Carriker, 1933)

= Tawny tit-spinetail =

Species of bird

The tawny tit-spinetail (Sylviorthorhynchus yanacensis) is a species of bird in the Furnariinae subfamily of the ovenbird family Furnariidae. It is found in Argentina, Bolivia, and Peru.

== Taxonomy and systematics ==
The tawny tit-spinetail was first placed in genus Leptasthenura but genetic data published in 2011 places it firmly in genus Sylviorthorhynchus. It shares the genus with Des Murs's wiretail (S. desmurii) and together they are sister species.

The tawny tit-spinetail is monotypic. However, the Peruvian and Bolivian populations have some plumage differences and there is speculation that they may represent different taxa.

== Description ==
The tawny tit-spinetail is 16 to 17.5 cm (6.3 to 6.9 in) long and weighs 10 to 12 g (0.35 to 0.42 oz). The sexes have the same plumage. Adults have a mostly bright cinnamon buff face with a tawny rufous forehead and a tawny brown crown. The Peruvian poplulation has a narrow buff supercilium while that of Bolivian birds is whitish. Their back is tawny brown and their rump and uppertail coverts are rufous. Their wing coverts are dusky with rufous edges and their flight feathers are dusky brown with much rufous on their outer webs. Their tail is graduated and rufous. Their underparts are bright cinnamon buff, somewhat paler in Bolivian birds than Peruvian ones. Their iris is brown, their bill dark brown to black, and their legs and feet dark gray to blackish.

== Distribution and habitat ==
The tawny tit-spinetail has a disjunct distribution. One population is found in the Cordillera Blanca of Peru's Department of Ancash and adjacent Department of Lima. A second is in the southern Peruvian departments of Apurímac, Cuzco, and [Puno. A third is found from La Paz Department in northern Bolivia south into Jujuy and Salta provinces in northwestern Argentina.

The tawny tit-spinetail primarily inhabits Polylepis woodland but also occurs in montane scrublands and some grasslands. In elevation it occurs between 3,950 and 4,600 m (13,000 and 15,100 ft) in Peru, between 2,800 and 4,200 m (9,200 and 13,800 ft) in Bolivia, and between 2,900 and 3,600 m (9,500 and 11,800 ft) in Argentina.

== Behavior ==
=== Movement ===
The tawny tit-spinetail is a year-round resident throughout its range.

=== Feeding ===
The tawny tit-spinetail's diet has not been detailed but it is known to be mostly arthropods with small amounts of plant material. It forages in pairs or in small groups that might be families and often join mixed-species feeding flocks. It usually forages by gleaning its prey from leaves, twigs, and the bark of branches. It sometimes hangs upside down to reach prey. It sometimes also forages on the ground.

=== Breeding ===
The tawny tit-spinetail's breeding season has not been defined but includes November and December. The one known nest was a ball of grass stems with a side entrance, and lined with plant fibers, feathers, and threads. It was in a fork of a Polylepis tree 2.5 m (8 ft) above the ground. Both members of the pair constructed it. Nothing else is known about the species' breeding biology.

=== Vocalization ===
The tawny tit-spinetail's song is "a series of rapid, loud, sharp chips that accelerate into a chatter of variable length and delivery: tchp tchp tchp-tchi'tchi'tchi'tchi'tchi'tchi-tchp" . Other vocalizations are "various chatters tjiketjitjitjitjitjitjit-t-t-t, and short notes t-t-tjk-tjketjketjketjketjk-tjk, rrrip rrrip tjktjktjke rrhie tjktjke", "a short snarling eep", and "quiet, liquid tchp notes".

== Status ==
The IUCN originally assessed the tawny tit-spinetail in 1988 as Near Threatened but in 2016 downlisted it to being of Least Concern. It has a large range and an estimated population of at least 50,000 mature individuals, though that number is believed to be decreasing. "The main threats are heavy grazing by livestock and uncontrolled use of fire, which combine to prevent Polylepis regeneration, especially where cutting for timber, firewood and charcoal occurs."
