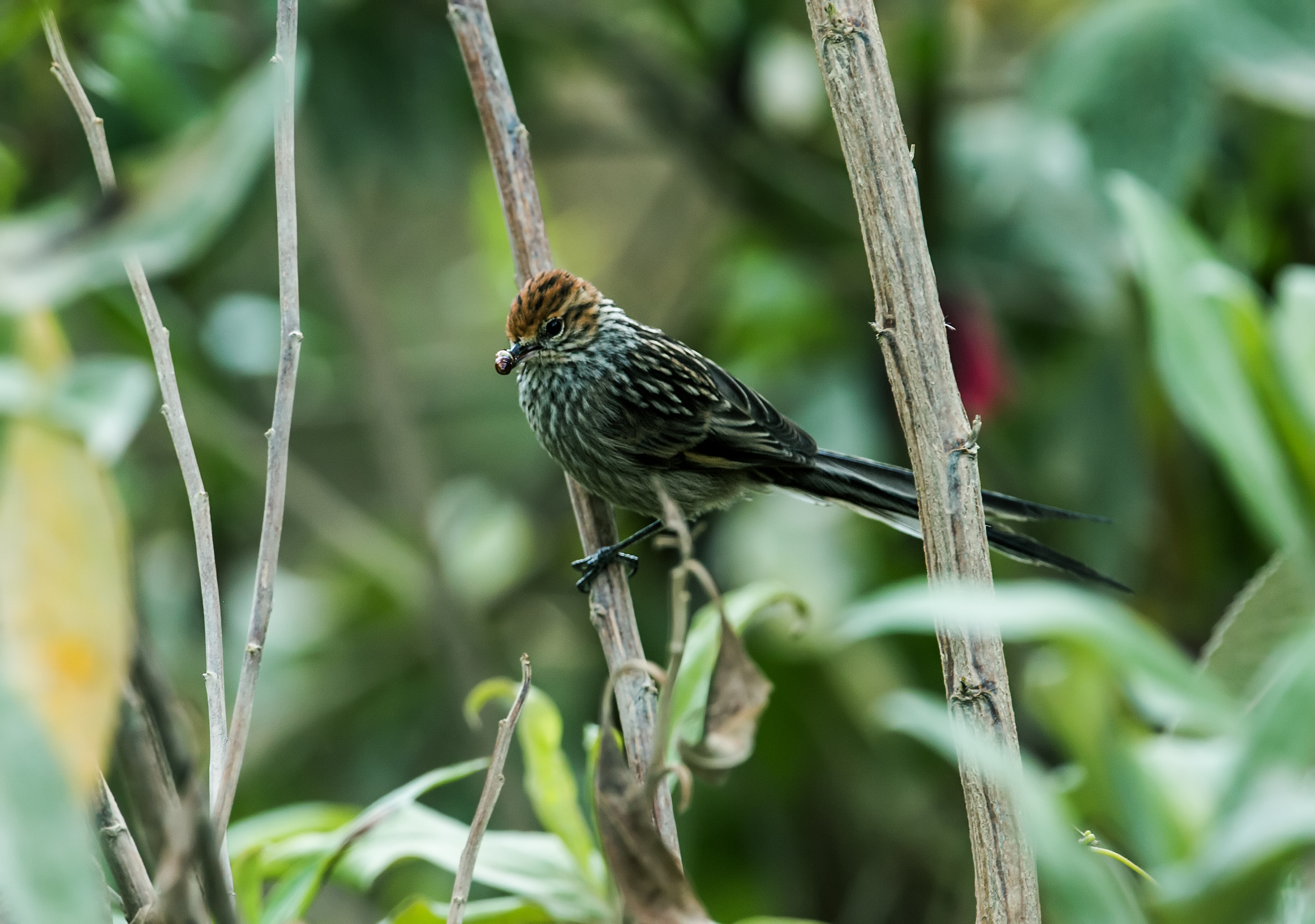

Conservation status
- Least Concern (IUCN 3.1)

Scientific classification
- Kingdom: Animalia
- Phylum: Chordata
- Class: Aves
- Order: Passeriformes
- Family: Furnariidae
- Genus: Leptasthenura
- Species: L. pileata

Binomial name
- Leptasthenura pileata Sclater, PL, 1881

= Rusty-crowned tit-spinetail =

Species of bird

The rusty-crowned tit-spinetail (Leptasthenura pileata) is a species of bird in the Furnariinae subfamily of the ovenbird family Furnariidae. It is endemic to Peru.

== Taxonomy and systematics ==
The rusty-crowned tit-spinetail has three subspecies, the nominate L. p. pileata (Sclater, PL, 1881), L. p. cajabambae (Chapman, 1921), and L. p. latistriata (Koepcke, M, 1965). Subspecies L. p. cajabambae had originally been described as a subspecies of the streak-backed tit-spinetail (L. striata).

== Description ==
The rusty-crowned tit-spinetail is about 15 cm (5.9 in) long and weighs 8 to 12.5 g (0.28 to 0.44 oz). It is a small, long-tailed furnariid with a short bill. The sexes have the same plumage. Adults of the nominate subspecies have a short indistinct white supercilium on an otherwise grayish face. Their crown is rufous with narrow white streaks. Their back is blackish with narrow white streaks and their rump light gray-brown with minimal or no streaks. Their wing coverts are dusky brown with light gray-brown edges and their flight feathers dusky brown with pale cinnamon-rufous at the base of some. Their tail's central pair of feathers are dusky brown with much pale gray, the next two pairs mostly dusky brown, and the outer pairs dusky brown with progressively more pale gray on their ends to the almost entirely pale outermost pair. Their throat is white with dusky spots and their breast and belly light grayish brown with faint whitish streaks on the breast. Their iris is dark brown, their bill black with a pink or pinkish gray base to the mandible, and their legs and feet gray to black. Subspecies L. p. cajabambae is very similar to the nominate but has black streaks rather than white on the crown. L. p. latistriata is also similar to the nominate, but the streaks on its back are wider and more contrasting. Its breast and belly are a darker gray and the breast streaks are heavier.

== Distribution and habitat ==
The rusty-crowned tit-spinetail is found only in the Andes of western Peru. Subspecies L. p. cajabambae is the northernmost; it occurs between the departments of Cajamarca and Junín. The nominate subspecies occurs in the valleys of the Chillón and Rímac rivers in the Department of Lima. L. p. latistriata occurs in the south-central departments of Huancavelica, Ayacucho, and Arequipa. The species inhabits arid montane scrub and relict woodlands, especially those dominated by Polylepis. In elevation it mostly occurs between 2,900 and 4,200 m (9,500 and 13,800 ft) but locally is found as low as 2,000 m (6,600 ft).

== Behavior ==
=== Movement ===
The rusty-crowned tit-spinetail is a year-round resident throughout its range.

=== Feeding ===
The rusty-crowned tit-spinetail feeds on arthropods but its diet is not known in detail. It regularly joins mixed-species foraging flocks. It captures prey by gleaning from foliage and twigs and by probing and picking at bark, mostly in upper and outer branches.

=== Breeding ===
Nothing is known about the rusty-crowned tit-spinetail's breeding biology.

=== Vocalization ===
The rusty-crowned tit-spinetail's song is "a c. 2 s long trill, slightly increasing in amplitude and speed, repeated at 3-6 s intervals". Its calls are "a simple tsak", "a staccato rick teek teek...", and "a sharp, high tchit".

== Status ==
The IUCN has assessed the rusty-crowned tit-spinetail as being of Least Concern. It has a large range, and though its population size is not known it is believed to be stable. No immediate threats have been identified. It is considered fairly common and "probably is little affected by human activity, other than the local effects of habitat loss".
