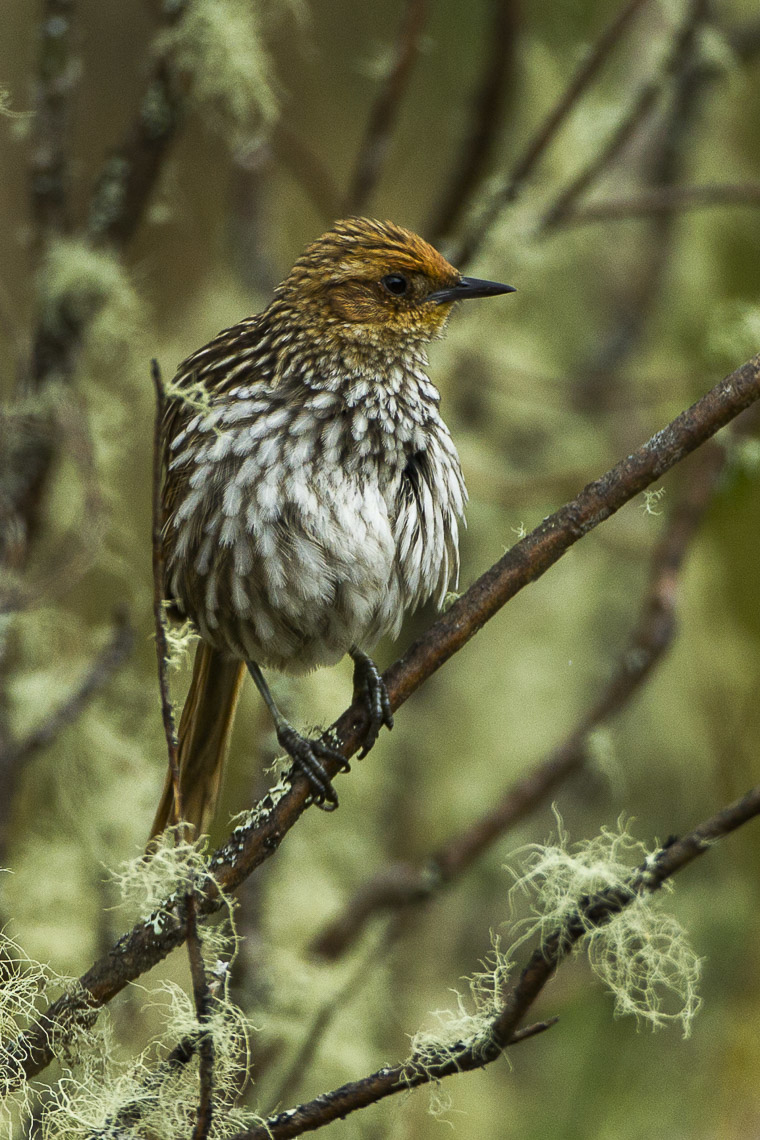

Conservation status
- Least Concern (IUCN 3.1)

Scientific classification
- Kingdom: Animalia
- Phylum: Chordata
- Class: Aves
- Order: Passeriformes
- Family: Furnariidae
- Genus: Asthenes
- Species: A. flammulata

Binomial name
- Asthenes flammulata (Jardine, 1850)

Subspecies
- See text

= Many-striped canastero =

Species of bird

The many-striped canastero (Asthenes flammulata) is a species of passerine bird in the Furnariinae subfamily of the ovenbird family Furnariidae. It is found in Colombia, Ecuador, and Peru.

== Taxonomy and systematics ==
The many-striped canastero was described as Synalaxis flammulatus by William Jardine in 1850 from a specimen taken in Andean tablelands near Quito. As of 2023 its taxonomy is unsettled. The International Ornithological Committee and the Clements taxonomy recognize these five subspecies:

- A. f. multostriata (Sclater, 1858)
- A. f. quindiana (Chapman, 1915)
- A. f. flammulata (Jardine, 1850)
- A. f. pallida Carriker, 1933
- A. f. taczanowskii (von Berlepsch & Stolzmann, 1894)

However, BirdLife International's Handbook of the Birds of the World does not recognize A. f. pallida but includes it within A. f. taczanowskii.

What are now the Junin canastero (A. virgata) and scribble-tailed canastero (A. maculicauda) have at times been suggested as additional subspecies of the many-striped canastero. Genetic data show the three to be separate but closely related sister species. In central Peru the many-striped canastero's range slightly overlaps that of the Junin canastero, and hybrids of the two species are known from that zone.

The nominate subspecies A. f. flammulata has been called Jardine's spine-tail.

This article follows the five-subspecies model.

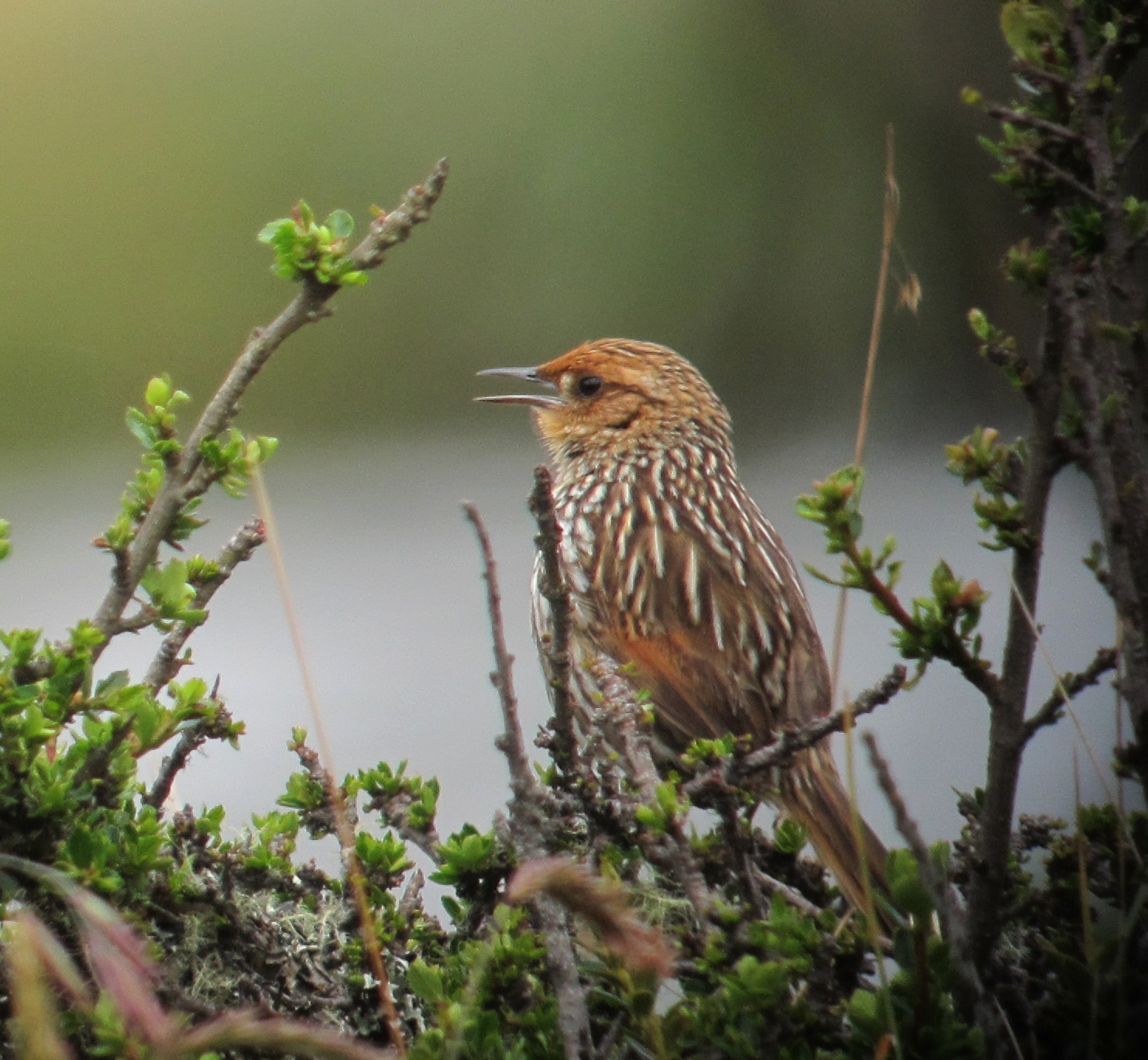
Rionegro, Antioquia, Colombia

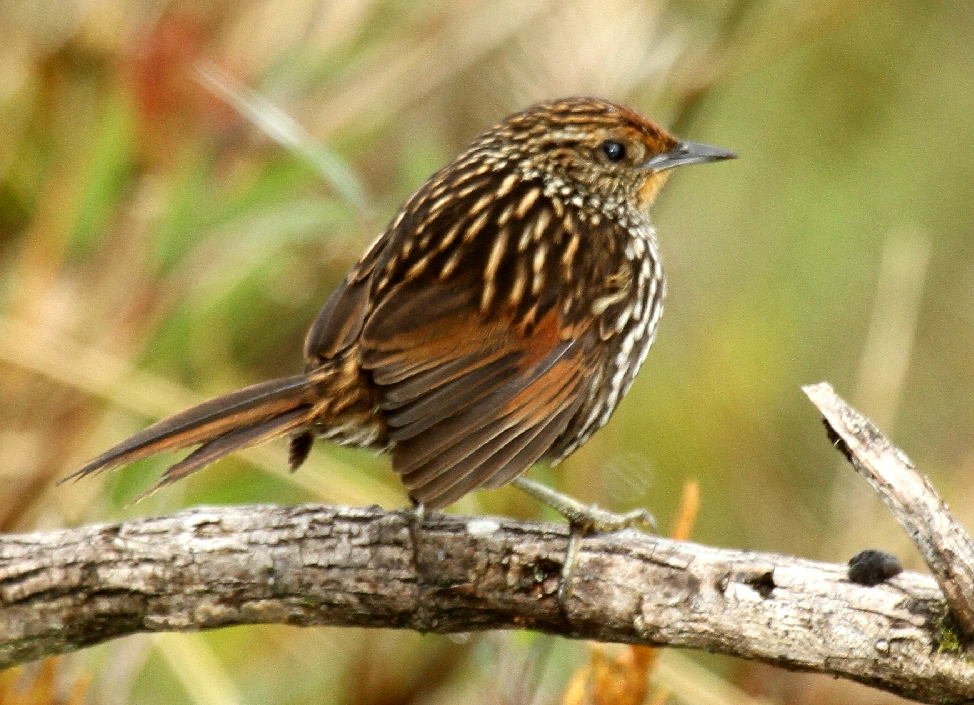
Acanama Reserve - Ecuador

== Description ==
The many-striped canastero is 16 to 17 cm (6.3 to 6.7 in) long and weighs 17 to 27 g (0.60 to 0.95 oz). It is a large canastero and the most dramatically striped of them. The sexes have the same plumage. Adults of the nominate subspecies have a buff-whitish supercilium on an otherwise dark brownish face with buff to whitish streaks. Their forehead is bright tawny-brown or rufescent brown with dark brown stripes that widen to become the brown crown with rufescent streaks. Their upperparts from back to uppertail coverts are dark brown with conspicuous pale buff streaks. Their wing coverts are dark brown with rufous edges and the flight feathers reddish-rufous with dark fuscous tips. Their tail feathers have dark brown inner webs, rufous outer webs, and are narrow producing a spiny appearance. Their chin and upper throat are orange-buff to orange-rufous that fades and becomes duller on their lower throat. Their breast and flanks are whitish with bold dark brown streaks that become paler and less bold on the whitish belly. Their lower flanks and undertail coverts are rufescent brown with indistinct pale streaks. Their iris is brown to dark brown, their maxilla black to dark horn, their mandible black to dark brownish with a blue-gray to gray base, and their legs and feet brown to olive to greenish gray. Juveniles have a fainter throat patch and less distinct streaks than adults.

Subspecies A. f. multostriata compared to the nominate has a more ochraceous supercilium, a darker chestnut forehead, a deeper rufous chin and throat, and wider blackish edges on the flank and undertail covert streaks. A. f. quindiana is similar to multostriata but with a white chin, a paler throat, and narrower streaks on the undertail coverts. A. f. taczanowskii has a pale buff to off-white throat and narrower streaks on the back than the nominate. The streaks on its underparts are confined to the breast and flanks; the middle of the breast, belly, and undertail coverts are unmarked grayish white. A. f. pallida is similar to taczanowskii but with somewhat wider streaks on the back and a buff-ochraceous wash on the throat and neck.

The many-striped canastero can be confused with the similar streak-backed canastero (A. wyatti), which is however much less heavily marked. It also resembles the distantly related Andean tit-spinetail (Leptasthenura andicola). The ranges of all three overlap in places.

== Distribution and habitat ==
The many-striped canastero has a disjunct distribution. The five subspecies are found thus:

- A. f. multostriata: Colombia's Eastern Andes between the departments of Norte de Santander and Cundinamarca
- A. f. quindiana: Colombia's Central Andes between the departments of Caldas and Cauca
- A. f. flammulata: from Nariño Department in Colombia's Western Andes south in the Andes through Ecuador just into northern Peru's Department of Cajamarca
- A. f. pallida: Andes of northern Peru's Cajamarca and La Libertad departments
- A. f. taczanowskii: Andes of northern and central Peru from southern Amazonas and Cajamarca departments south to Ancash and Junín departments

The many-striped canastero inhabits the ecotone between timberline and páramo grasslands, a landscape characterized by rock outcrops, scattered shrubs, Espeletia, and groves of Polylepis trees. In elevation it mostly ranges between 3,000 and 4,500 m (9,800 and 14,800 ft) but occurs as low as 2,700 m (8,900 ft) in Colombia.

== Behavior ==
=== General ===
The many-striped canastero is described as "often sneaky and remaining hidden", hopping and running among grass tussocks, sometimes with its tail cocked. In calm weather it sometimes perches for several minutes on a grass clump or shrub.

=== Movement ===
The many-striped canastero is a year-round resident throughout its range.

=== Feeding ===
The many-striped canastero feeds on arthropods. It forages singly or in pairs, typically by gleaning prey mostly from the ground and also from shrubs and Polylepis branches.

=== Breeding ===
Nothing is known about the many-striped canastero's breeding biology.

=== Vocalization ===
The many-striped canastero's song is an "accelerating series of buzzy notes that initially rises in pitch, and towards the end smoothly changes into a stuttering descending trill tzee-tzee-tzee-tzeetzeetzetztztztzrrrrrrr". It typically sings from a perch atop a shrub, and sometimes two birds countersing. The song differs little among the subspecies. The bird makes a "plaintive nasal note eeuw or mew" when disturbed and a "short high-pitched pit note" as an alarm call.

== Status ==
The IUCN has assessed the many-striped canastero as being of Least Concern. It has a very large range but its population size and trend are not known. No immediate threats have been identified. It is considered uncommon in the south and fairly common in the north but is not well known anywhere. It is "[t]hought to be highly susceptible to overgrazing, but benefits from occasional burning of páramo". It occurs in at least two protected areas in Ecuador.
