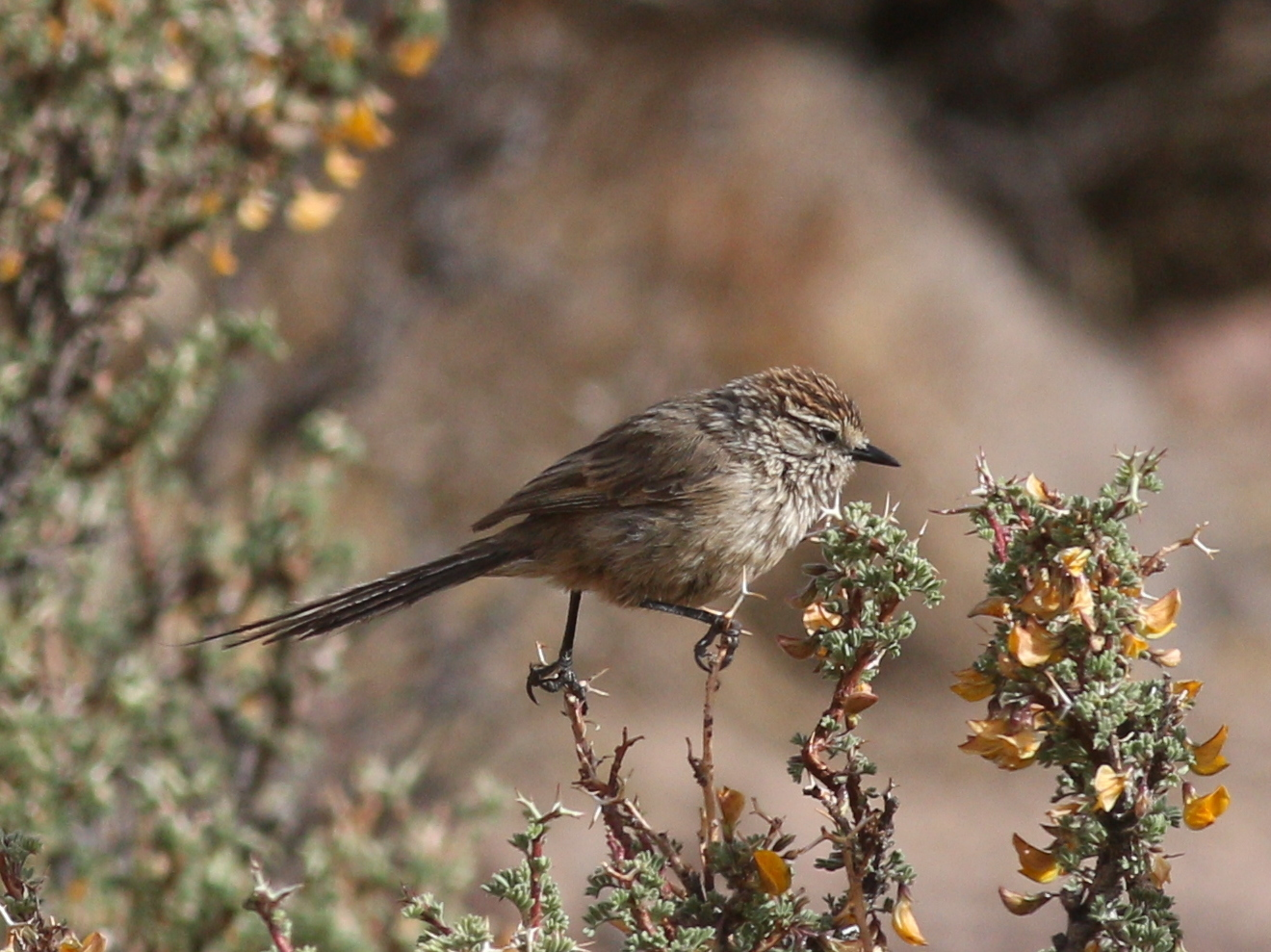
- Plain-mantled tit-spinetail, Leptasthenura aegithaloides

Scientific classification
- Kingdom: Animalia
- Phylum: Chordata
- Class: Aves
- Order: Passeriformes
- Family: Furnariidae
- Genus: Leptasthenura; Reichenbach, 1853

Type species
- Synallaxis aegithaloides Plain-mantled tit-spinetail Kittlitz, 1830

Species
- See text

= Tit-spinetail =

Tit-spinetails

Genus of birds

Tit-spinetails are small passerine birds of the genus Leptasthenura, belonging to the ovenbird family Furnariidae. They are found in South America, particularly the southern and Andean parts of the continent. They are somewhat similar to birds of the tit family in their shape and feeding behaviour, hence the first part of their name. The "spinetail" part of their name refers to their long, pointed tail feathers. Tit-spinetails have short rounded wings, short pointed bills and are mainly brown in colour. Their nests are built in holes or the old nests of other birds.

== Taxonomy ==
The genus Leptasthenura was introduced in 1853 by the German naturalist Ludwig Reichenbach. The name combines the Ancient Greek leptos meaning "thin", asthenēs meaning "weak" and oura meaning "tail". The type species was designated as the plain-mantled tit-spinetail by George Robert Gray in 1855.

=== Species ===
The genus contains nine species:

Image	Scientific name	Common name	Distribution
	Leptasthenura fuliginiceps	Brown-capped tit-spinetail	puna and sierras de Cordoba
	Leptasthenura platensis	Tufted tit-spinetail	Argentina and Uruguay
	Leptasthenura aegithaloides	Plain-mantled tit-spinetail	southern Peru to northern Patagonia
	Leptasthenura striolata	Striolated tit-spinetail	southern Brazil
	Leptasthenura pileata	Rusty-crowned tit-spinetail	Peruvian Andes
	Leptasthenura xenothorax	White-browed tit-spinetail	southern Peru
	Leptasthenura striata	Streak-backed tit-spinetail	puna grassland
	Leptasthenura andicola	Andean tit-spinetail	northern Andes
	Leptasthenura setaria	Araucaria tit-spinetail	southern Brazil and northern selva misionera

The tawny tit-spinetail is placed together with Des Murs's wiretail in the genus Sylviorthorhynchus.
