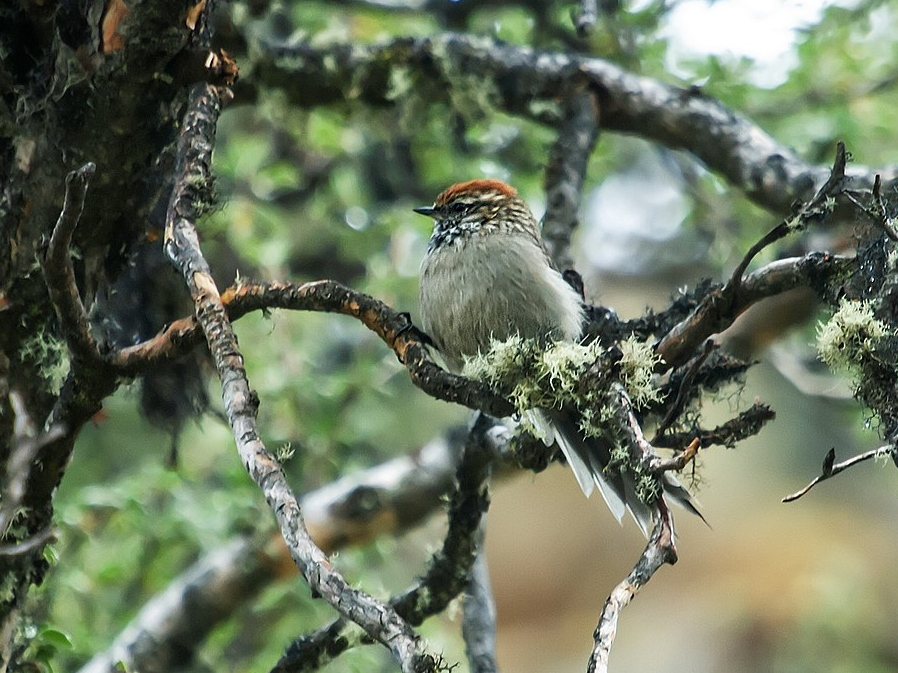

Conservation status
- Near Threatened (IUCN 3.1)

Scientific classification
- Kingdom: Animalia
- Phylum: Chordata
- Class: Aves
- Order: Passeriformes
- Family: Furnariidae
- Genus: Leptasthenura
- Species: L. xenothorax

Binomial name
- Leptasthenura xenothorax Chapman, 1921

= White-browed tit-spinetail =

Species of bird

The white-browed tit-spinetail (Leptasthenura xenothorax) is a Near Threatened species of bird in the Furnariinae subfamily of the ovenbird family Furnariidae. It is endemic to Peru.

== Taxonomy and systematics ==
The white-browed tit-spinetail is monotypic.

== Description ==
The white-browed tit-spinetail is 16 to 18 cm (6.3 to 7.1 in) long and weighs about 13 g (0.46 oz). It is a small-bodied, long-tailed furnariid with a short bill. The sexes have the same plumage. Adults have a white supercilium with a narrow black border above it on an otherwise blackish and whitish streaked face. Their crown is bright rufous. Their upperparts are dull grayish brown, with narrow black-outlined white streaks that become more prominent on the lower back, then fainter on the rump, and become more obvious but still pale on the uppertail coverts. Their wings are dark fuscous with dull rufescent edges on the coverts and a pale tawny patch across the flight feathers. Their tail is mostly dark fuscous to black; the feathers have bare shafts on their tips giving a spiny appearance. Their throat and upper breast are whitish with coarse black mottling and the rest of their underparts are unmarked pale gray-brown. Their iris is brown to blackish gray, their bill black with a pinkish base to the mandible, and their legs and feet black.

== Distribution and habitat ==
The white-browed tit-spinetail is found only in the Peruvian Andes. It is only known from a few locations in the departments of Cuzco and Apurímac. It primarily inhabits Polylepis woodlands but occasionally occurs in montane scrublands. It favors large areas of primary forest but will forage in smaller patches. In elevation it occurs between 3,700 and 4,550 m (12,100 and 14,900 ft) but is most common in the lower part of that range.

== Behavior ==
=== Movement ===
The white-browed tit-spinetail is a year-round resident throughout its range.

=== Feeding ===
The white-browed tit-spinetail feeds on arthropods but its diet is not known in detail. It forages in pairs or small family groups and regularly joins mixed-species foraging flocks. It typically forages acrobatically in dense foliage near the top and on the outermost branches of Polylepis trees, where it gleans the foliage for prey.

=== Breeding ===
The white-browed tit-spinetail's breeding season has not been fully defined but is known to include October and November. It is monogamous. Only one nest is known; it was a cup of moss, lichen, and bark fibers in a natural cavity in a Polylepis racemosa tree and contained two eggs. The incubation period and time to fledging are not known. Both parents build the nest and provision nestlings.

=== Vocalization ===
The white-browed tit-spinetail is very vocal and often sings while foraging. Its song is "a rapid, dry descending trill, sometimes with some 1-4 shorter introductory notes tjit tjit trrrrrrreeeeeeeeuuu and lasting two seconds". Its contact call is "a check or tjit note", and it also makes "a series of tleet notes".

== Status ==
The IUCN originally in 1988 assessed the white-browed tit-spinetail as Threatened, then in 1994 as Critically Endangered and from 2000 – 2024 as Endangered. As of 2024, the species is listed as Near Threatened. Primary threats to the species include habitat degradation from fires and grazing. "High-Andean Polylepis forest ecosystems represent one of the most threatened woodland ecosystems in the world...which continues to decline in quantity and quality." On the brighter side, "[c]ommunity-based woodland habitat restoration efforts are currently underway at three locations in the Cordillera Vilcanota (Abra Malaga, Hulloc and Cancha-Cancha) under the guidance of the Peruvian non-governmental organization Asociación Ecosistemas Andinos (ECOAN)."
