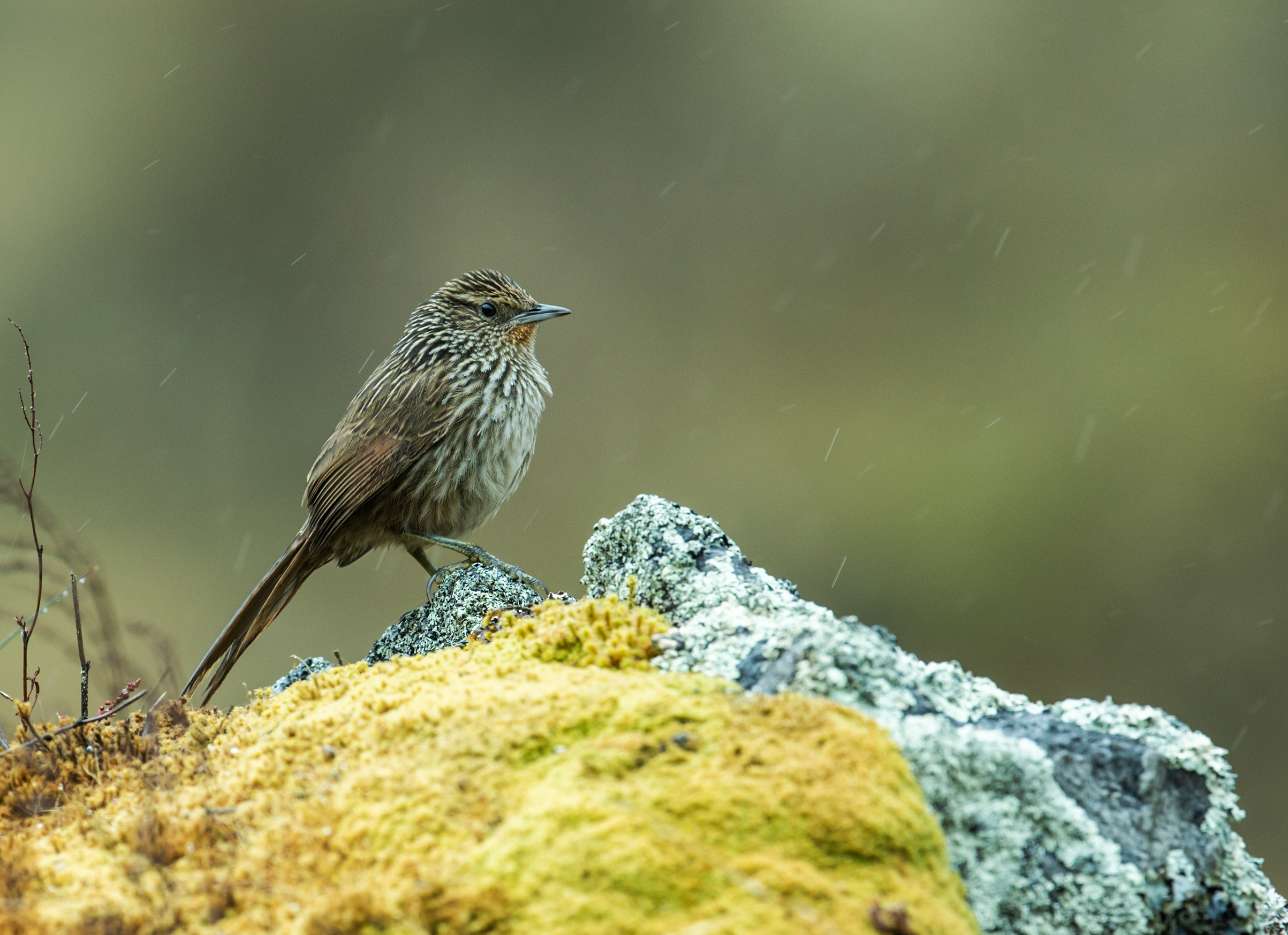

Conservation status
- Least Concern (IUCN 3.1)

Scientific classification
- Kingdom: Animalia
- Phylum: Chordata
- Class: Aves
- Order: Passeriformes
- Family: Furnariidae
- Genus: Asthenes
- Species: A. virgata

Binomial name
- Asthenes virgata (Sclater, PL, 1874)

= Junín canastero =

Species of bird

The Junin canastero (Asthenes virgata) is a species of bird in the Furnariinae subfamily of the ovenbird family Furnariidae. It is endemic to Peru.

== Taxonomy and systematics ==
The Junin canastero is monotypic. It and the scribble-tailed canastero (A. maculicauda) have at times been suggested as subspecies of the many-striped canastero (A. flammulata). Genetic data show the three to be separate but closely related sister species. In central Peru the Junin canastero's range slightly overlaps that of the many-striped canastero, and hybrids of the two species are known from that zone.

== Description ==
The Junin canastero is about 17.5 to 18 cm (6.9 to 7.1 in) long; one specimens weighed 22 g (0.78 oz). The sexes have the same plumage. Adults have a narrow buff supercilium on an otherwise ochraceous brown face. Their crown is black with orange brown streaks. Their nape and upper back are black with pale buff streaks. Their lower back, rump, and uppertail coverts are medium brown or olive brown with black and buff streaks. Their wing coverts are olive brown with black and buff streaks. Their outer flight feathers are rufous with reddish brown edges and the inner ones dusky brown with olive brown edges; all have dusky tips. Their central pair of tail feathers are dusky brown, the next pair have dusky brown inner webs and rufous outer webs with dusky edges, and the other three pairs are rufous with a black line on the outer web and black and dusky mottling on the inner web. Their chin is ochraceous buff. Their breast and belly are pale creamy brown with faint tawny olive streaks on the breast. Their flanks are tawny olive with buffy white streaks and their vent area is tawny. Their iris is dark brown, their maxilla horn, their mandible grayish pink, and their legs and feet olive.

== Distribution and habitat ==
The Junin canastero has a disjunct distribution in central and southern Peru. It is found where the departments of Junín, Pasco, and Lima meet and also from Ayacucho department through Cuzco and Apurímac departments slightly into Puno department. There are scattered sightings between these two population centers.

The Junin canastero primarily inhabits humid landscapes with tall bunch grass, sometimes those with scattered bushes and near stands of polylepis. It also sometimes occurs in rocky areas of bunchgrass without bushes or trees. In elevation it ranges between 3,300 and 4,600 m (10,800 and 15,100 ft).

== Behavior ==
=== Movement ===
The Junin canastero is a year-round resident throughout its range.

=== Feeding ===
The Junin canastero's diet has not been studied; it is assumed to be mostly or entirely arthropods. It usually forages singly or in pairs, and mostly on the ground.

=== Breeding ===
Nothing is known about the Junin canastero's breeding biology.

=== Vocalization ===
The Junin canastero's song is "a dry, accelerating, descending trill sometimes with a stuttering quality: tzree-tzree-tzree'ti'ti'ti'ti-ti'ti'ti-ti'ti'ti-ti'ti'tu". Its calls include "a 'mewing ... tuuuiit' and, in alarm, a complaining eek".

== Status ==
The IUCN has assessed the Junin canastero as being of Least Concern. It has a restricted range and its population size and trend are not known. No immediate threats have been identified. "This canastero potentially is vulnerable to habitat loss or degradation, such as through overgrazing."
