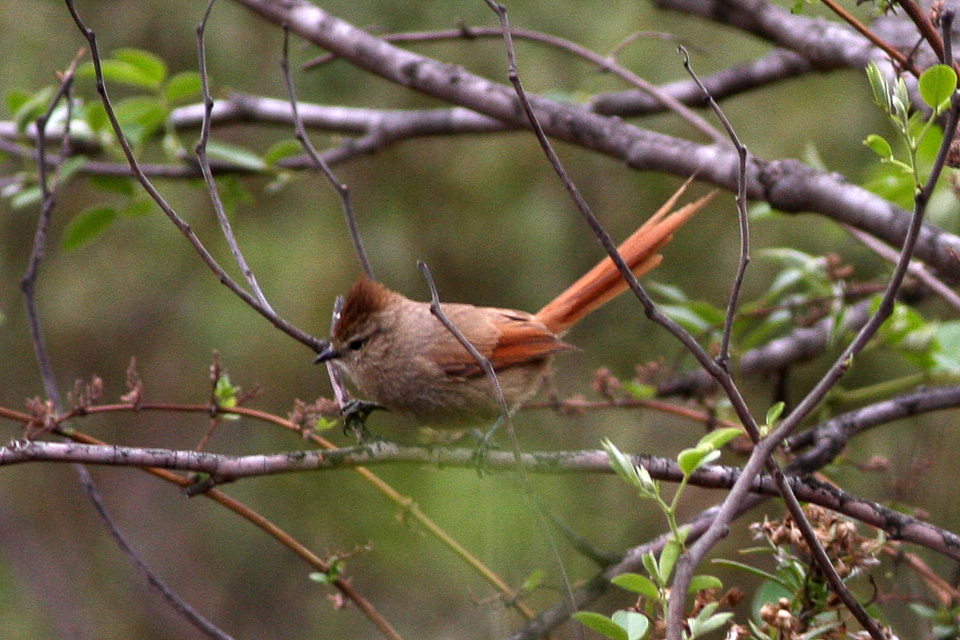

Conservation status
- Least Concern (IUCN 3.1)

Scientific classification
- Kingdom: Animalia
- Phylum: Chordata
- Class: Aves
- Order: Passeriformes
- Family: Furnariidae
- Genus: Leptasthenura
- Species: L. fuliginiceps

Binomial name
- Leptasthenura fuliginiceps (D'Orbigny & Lafresnaye, 1837)

= Brown-capped tit-spinetail =

Species of bird

The brown-capped tit-spinetail (Leptasthenura fuliginiceps) is a species of bird in the Furnariinae subfamily of the ovenbird family Furnariidae. It is found in Argentina and Bolivia.

== Taxonomy and systematics ==
The brown-capped tit-spinetail has two subspecies, the nominate L. f. fuliginiceps (D'Orbigny & Lafresnaye, 1837) and L. f. paranensis (Sclater, PL, 1862).

== Description ==
The brown-capped tit-spinetail is 15 to 16 cm (5.9 to 6.3 in) long and weighs 9 to 13 g (0.32 to 0.46 oz). It is a small, slender, long-tailed furnariid with a short bill. The sexes have the same plumage. Adults of the nominate subspecies have a pale dull buff supercilium on an otherwise plain brownish face. Their crown is brown, their upper back a paler brown, and their lower back, rump, and uppertail coverts are refescent. Their wings are mostly rufous. Their tail is rufous; it is graduated and the feathers narrow at the tips giving a spiny appearance. Their underparts are pale tawny brownish with a rufescent tinge to the flanks and undertail coverts. Their iris is brown to dark brown, their maxilla black to dusky brownish horn, their mandible horn to pearl-gray with a dusky tip, and their legs and feet olive greenish, grayish olive, or gray. Juveniles have a less distinct crown than adults, with some slight mottling on the breast and rounded tail feathers. Subspecies L. f. paranensis has a less brownish back and paler and grayer underparts than the nominate.

== Distribution and habitat ==
The nominate subspecies of the brown-capped tit-spinetail is found in the Bolivian Andes between the west-central department of La Paz and the southern Potosí and Tarija departments. Subspecies L. f. paranensis is found in the Andes of northwestern Argentina from Jujuy and Salta provinces south to Mendoza and the sierras de Cordoba. The species inhabits a variety of landscapes including arid, semi-humid, and humid montane scrublands; Polylepis woodlands; and semi-humid woodlands. In scrublands if favors steep ravines. In elevation it mostly ranges between 1,500 and 3,900 m (4,900 and 12,800 ft) in Bolivia and between 1,000 and 2,500 m (3,300 and 8,200 ft) in Argentina.

== Behavior ==
=== Movement ===
The brown-capped tit-spinetail is mostly a year-round resident throughout its range, though some of the Argentine population makes elevation movements between the seasons.

=== Feeding ===
The brown-capped tit-spinetail feeds on arthropods. It forages in pairs or in small groups and often joins mixed-species feeding flocks, and feeds from the forest's understorey to its canopy. It usually forages by gleaning its prey from leaves, twigs, and the bark of branches. It sometimes hangs upside down to reach prey.

=== Breeding ===
The brown-capped tit-spinetail breeds in the austral spring and summer. It is thought to be monogamous. Its nest is a ball of plant material lined with softer plant fibers, down, and feathers, constructed in a crevice in a rock or building. The clutch size is two or three eggs. The incubation period, time to fledging, and details of parental care are not known.

=== Vocalization ===
The brown-capped tit-spinetail's song has not been described. Its call is "a faint insect-like 'pree' ".

== Status ==
The IUCN has assessed the brown-capped tit-spinetail as being of Least Concern. It has a large range; its population size is not known but is believed to be stable. No immediate threats have been identified. It is considered uncommon to common.
