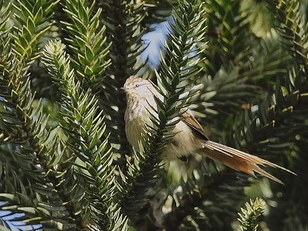

Conservation status
- Least Concern (IUCN 3.1)

Scientific classification
- Kingdom: Animalia
- Phylum: Chordata
- Class: Aves
- Order: Passeriformes
- Family: Furnariidae
- Genus: Leptasthenura
- Species: L. striolata

Binomial name
- Leptasthenura striolata (Pelzeln, 1856)

= Striolated tit-spinetail =

Species of bird

The striolated tit-spinetail (Leptasthenura striolata) is a species of bird in the Furnariinae subfamily of the ovenbird family Furnariidae. It is endemic to Brazil.

== Taxonomy and systematics ==
The striolated tit-spinetail is monotypic. It is locally called grimpeirinho.

== Description ==
The striolated tit-spinetail is 15 to 16 cm (5.9 to 6.3 in) long and weighs 10 to 11 g (0.35 to 0.39 oz). It is a small, long-tailed furnariid with a short bill. The sexes have the same plumage. Adults have a buff-whitish supercilium on an otherwise grayish face. Their crown is black with buff streaks and their upperparts brown with obvious buff streaks on the back. Their wings are dark brown with paler feather edges. Their tail is mostly brown with some rufous on the outermost feathers; the tail is graduated and appears forked due to the central feather's having reduced inner webs. Their underparts are dull pale ochraceous with brownish speckles on the throat and upper breast. Their iris is dark brown, their bill black with a pinkish gray base to the mandible, and their legs and feet greenish. Juveniles have less distinct streaking and a shorter, less deeply forked, tail than adults.

== Distribution and habitat ==
The striolated tit-spinetail is found in much of the southern Brazilian states of Paraná and Santa Catarina, and somewhat into northern Rio Grande do Sul. It inhabits temperate forests dominated by Podocarpus and especially Araucaria, and also riparian thickets and secondary forest. It favors the forest edges and is seldom in the interior of tall forest. In elevation it ranges between 500 and 1,200 m (1,600 and 3,900 ft).

== Behavior ==
=== Movement ===
The striolated tit-spinetail is a year-round resident throughout its range.

=== Feeding ===
The striolated tit-spinetail feeds on arthropods. It usually forages in pairs and occasionally joins mixed-species feeding flocks. It forages from the forest's understorey to its canopy, gleaning prey from foliage and branches. It often hangs upside down to reach prey.

=== Breeding ===
The striolated tit-spinetail breeds in the austral spring and summer. It is monogamous. It builds a platform nest of twigs and moss lined with feathers, usually in a natural cavity or an old woodpecker hole. The clutch size, incubation period, and time to fledging are not known. Both parents provision nestlings.

=== Vocalization ===
The striolated tit-spinetail's song is a "level, short, hurried series of 2-5 very high, thin or full notes, last one often slightly lower". It has been rendered "psi, psi-psi, ks-ks-ksks-ks". Its calls are "an assortment of squeaky notes".

== Status ==
The IUCN has assessed the striolated tit-spinetail as being of Least Concern. It has a large range, and though its population size is not known it is believed to be stable. No immediate threats have been identified. It is considered fairly common to common and "evidently common in human-disturbed habitats".
