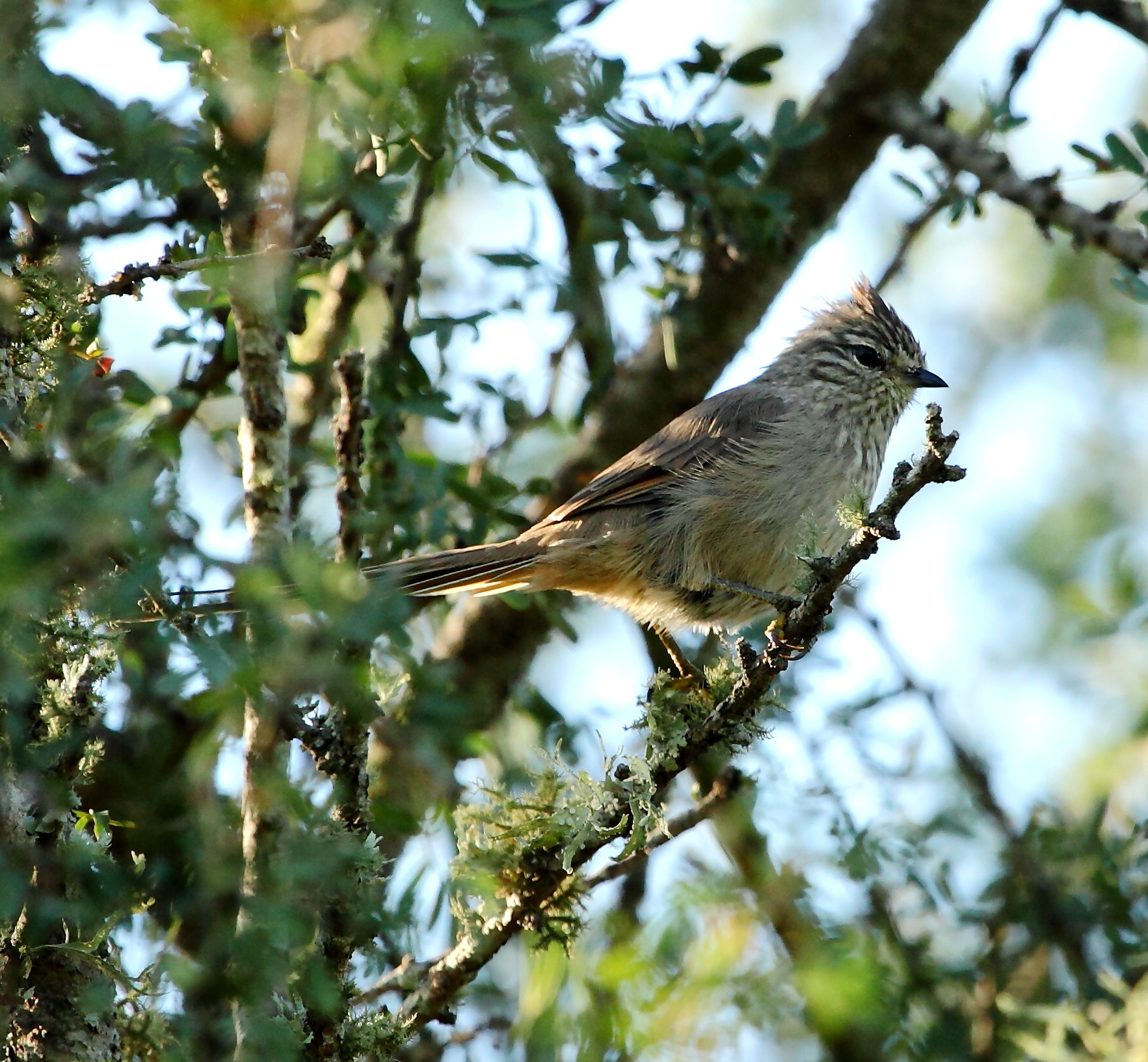
- Tufted tit-spinetail at Santa Fe Province, Argentina

Conservation status
- Least Concern (IUCN 3.1)

Scientific classification
- Kingdom: Animalia
- Phylum: Chordata
- Class: Aves
- Order: Passeriformes
- Family: Furnariidae
- Genus: Leptasthenura
- Species: L. platensis

Binomial name
- Leptasthenura platensis Reichenbach, 1853

= Tufted tit-spinetail =

Species of bird

The tufted tit-spinetail (Leptasthenura platensis) is a species of bird in the Furnariinae subfamily of the ovenbird family Furnariidae. It is found in Argentina, Brazil, Uruguay, and possibly Paraguay.

== Taxonomy and systematics ==
The tufted tit-spinetail is monotypic.

== Description ==
The tufted tit-spinetail is 15 to 17 cm (5.9 to 6.7 in) long and weighs 10 to 12 g (0.35 to 0.42 oz). It is a small, slender, long-tailed furnariid with a short crest and a short bill. The sexes have the same plumage. Adults have a thin pale supercilium on an otherwise dull grayish-brown face. Their crown and crest are dark brown with paler streaks, their back and rump are dull grayish brown, and their uppertail coverts a paler grayish brown with a tawny tinge. Their wings are mostly grayish brown with some paler feather edges and tips. Their tail is mostly dark and fuscous with some dull rufous at the ends of the outermost feathers; it is graduated, and the feathers narrow at the tips, giving a spiny appearance. Their throat and upper breast are whitish with faint brownish markings; the rest of their underparts are pale grayish brown with slightly darker flanks and undertail coverts. Their iris is brown, their bill black with a pale base to the mandible, and their legs and feet dark olive-green. Juveniles do not have a crest; they have a less distinctly marked crown and breast than adults and rounded tail feathers.

== Distribution and habitat ==
The tufted tit-spinetail is found in northern and central Argentina from Salta Province to Buenos Aires Province, in western Rio Grande do Sul in extreme southern Brazil, and in most of Uruguay. There are only sight records in Paraguay, which leads the South American Classification Committee of the American Ornithological Society to call it hypothetical in that country. It inhabits a variety of landscapes including gallery forest and other riparian zones, arid scrublands, dry woodlands, and brushy areas and Monte Desert near the last. In elevation it ranges from sea level to 1,000 m (3,300 ft).

== Behavior ==
=== Movement ===
The tufted tit-spinetail is mostly a year-round resident throughout its range, though some individuals appear to wander out of the species' core range.

=== Feeding ===
The tufted tit-spinetail feeds on arthropods. It forages in pairs or in small groups that may be families, and feeds from the forest's understorey to its canopy. It usually forages by gleaning its prey from foliage, twigs, and the bark of branches. It sometimes hangs upside down to reach prey.

=== Breeding ===
The tufted tit-spinetail breeds in the austral spring and summer. It is thought to be monogamous. It builds a cup nest of twigs, grass, feathers, and hair in a cavity. It uses natural cavities, woodpecker holes, and the previous season's nests of other furnariids including the "mud ovens" of horneros. The clutch size is two to four eggs and occasionally up to six. The incubation period is about 14 to 15 days and fledging occurs about 15 or 16 days after hatching. Both parents provision the young.

=== Vocalization ===
The tufted tit-spinetail's song is "an accelerating, descending trill introduced by distinct sharp notes, 'tsi, tsirrrrr' ". Its most common call is "a series of short notes followed by a sharp trill, e.g. 'pit-pit-pit … prrr' ". The call is also described as "tswee tswee tswee tittle-tit ending in a rattle".

== Status ==
The IUCN has assessed the tufted tit-spinetail as being of Least Concern. It has a very large range, and though its population size is not known, it is believed to be stable. No immediate threats have been identified. It is considered common in much of its range, though its status in Paraguay "requires further investigation".
