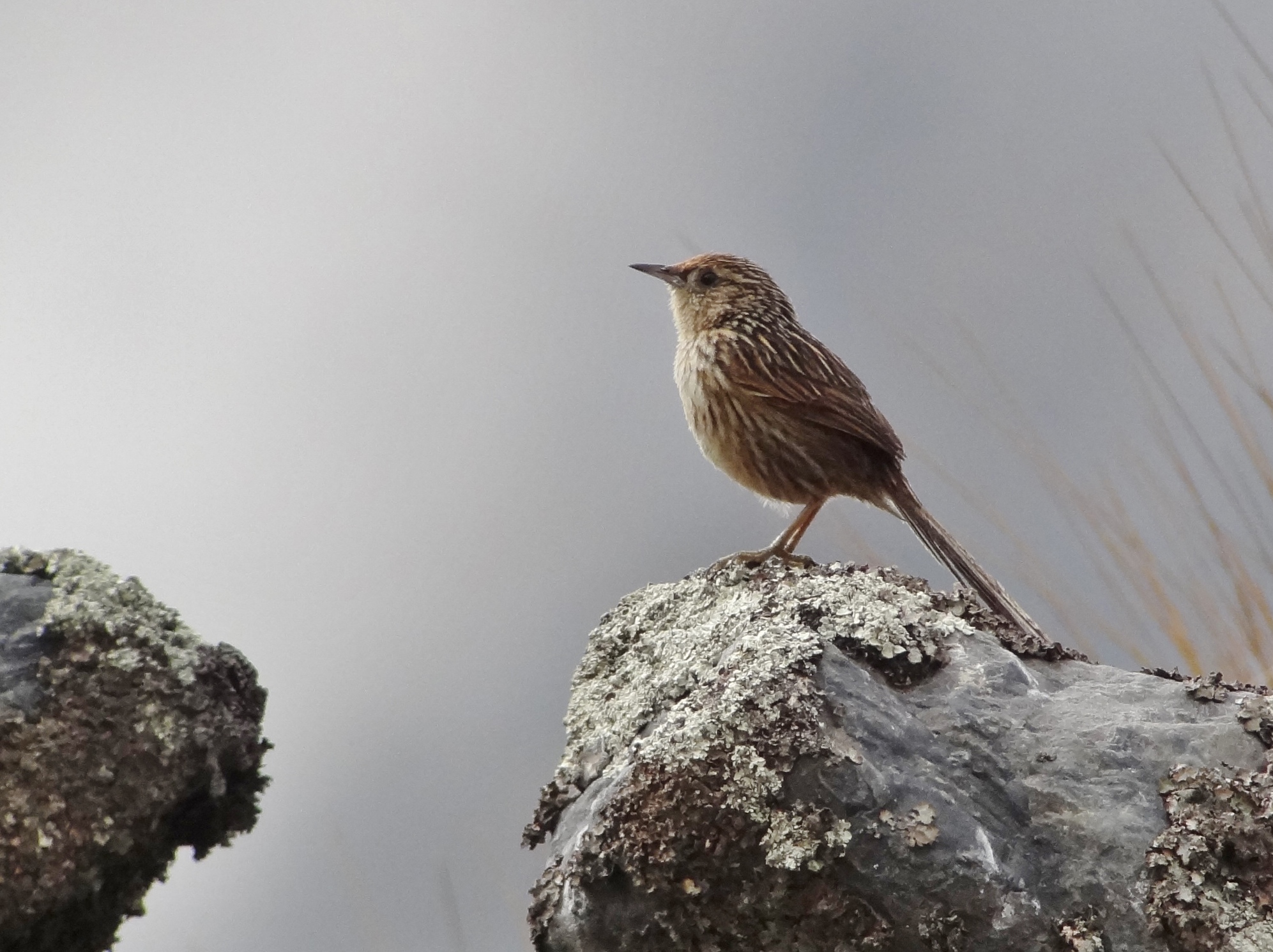

Conservation status
- Least Concern (IUCN 3.1)

Scientific classification
- Kingdom: Animalia
- Phylum: Chordata
- Class: Aves
- Order: Passeriformes
- Family: Furnariidae
- Genus: Asthenes
- Species: A. maculicauda

Binomial name
- Asthenes maculicauda (Berlepsch, 1901)

= Scribble-tailed canastero =

Species of bird

The scribble-tailed canastero (Asthenes maculicauda) is a species of bird in the Furnariinae subfamily of the ovenbird family Furnariidae. It is found in Argentina, Bolivia, and Peru.

== Taxonomy and systematics ==
The scribble-tailed canastero is monotypic, but the Argentinian population may warrant subspecies status. (See the Distribution and habitat section.) It and the Junin canastero (A. virgata) have at times been suggested as subspecies of the many-striped canastero (A. flammulata). Genetic data show the three to be separate but closely related sister species.

== Description ==
The scribble-tailed canastero is about 17 cm (6.7 in) long and weighs about 19 g (0.67 oz). It is a large canastero with a unique pattern on its long tail's pointed feathers. The sexes have the same plumage. Adults have a faint pale supercilium and a dark brown stripe behind the eye on an otherwise buffy face. Their forehead is rufous that blends to a blackish brown crown with rufescent buff streaks. Their hindcrown and nape are dark brown with buff streaks and their back and rump are also dark brown but with wider buff streaks. Their wing coverts are dark brown with rufescent edges and their flight feathers dark browish fuscous with rufous-chestnut bases. Their uppertail coverts and central tail feathers have a ragged mix of rufescent to buff-brown, dark brown, and olive-brown streaks. The rest of their tail is mostly dark fuscous with rufescent and olive-brown edges and streaks. Their throat is pale grayish buff, their breast washed with tawny with a band of dark brown streaks on its lower part, and their belly light buff-brownish. Their sides and flanks are streaked dark brown and light buff, and their undertail coverts are light tawny-brown with faint darker streaks. Their iris is brown, their maxilla gray to dark gray, their mandible whitish gray to gray (sometimes with a darker tip), and their legs and feet olive to olive-green. Juveniles have a duller forehead, more mottled underparts, and a less distinct tail pattern than adults.

== Distribution and habitat ==
The scribble-tailed canastero has a disjunct distribution. One population is found in the Andes of southern Peru's Department of Puno and west-central Bolivia. The other is found in northwestern Argentina between southern Jujuy Province and northwestern Catamarca Province. Both populations inhabit páramo grasslands near tree line, a landscape characterized by lush tall bunch grass and low shrubs. In elevation it mostly occurs between 3,000 and 4,300 m (9,800 and 14,100 ft) but is found locally as low as 2,250 m (7,400 ft).

== Behavior ==
=== Movement ===
The scribble-tailed canastero is a year-round resident throughout its range.

=== Feeding ===
The scribble-tailed canastero feeds on arthropods. It forages singly or in pairs and apparently mostly on the ground and in low vegetation. It has been observed flying up to capture insects on the wing.

=== Breeding ===
Nothing is known about the scribble-tailed canastero's breeding biology.

=== Vocalization ===
The scribble-tailed canastero's song is "a series of 'tree' notes that end in fast, descending trill". Its call is "a rising whistled 'tuuuiit' or 'tooeee' ".

== Status ==
The IUCN has assessed the scribble-tailed canastero as being of Least Concern. It has a restricted range and an unknown population size that is believed to be decreasing. No immediate threats have been identified. It is considered rare to uncommon and "[t]hought to be highly susceptible to overgrazing and burning".
