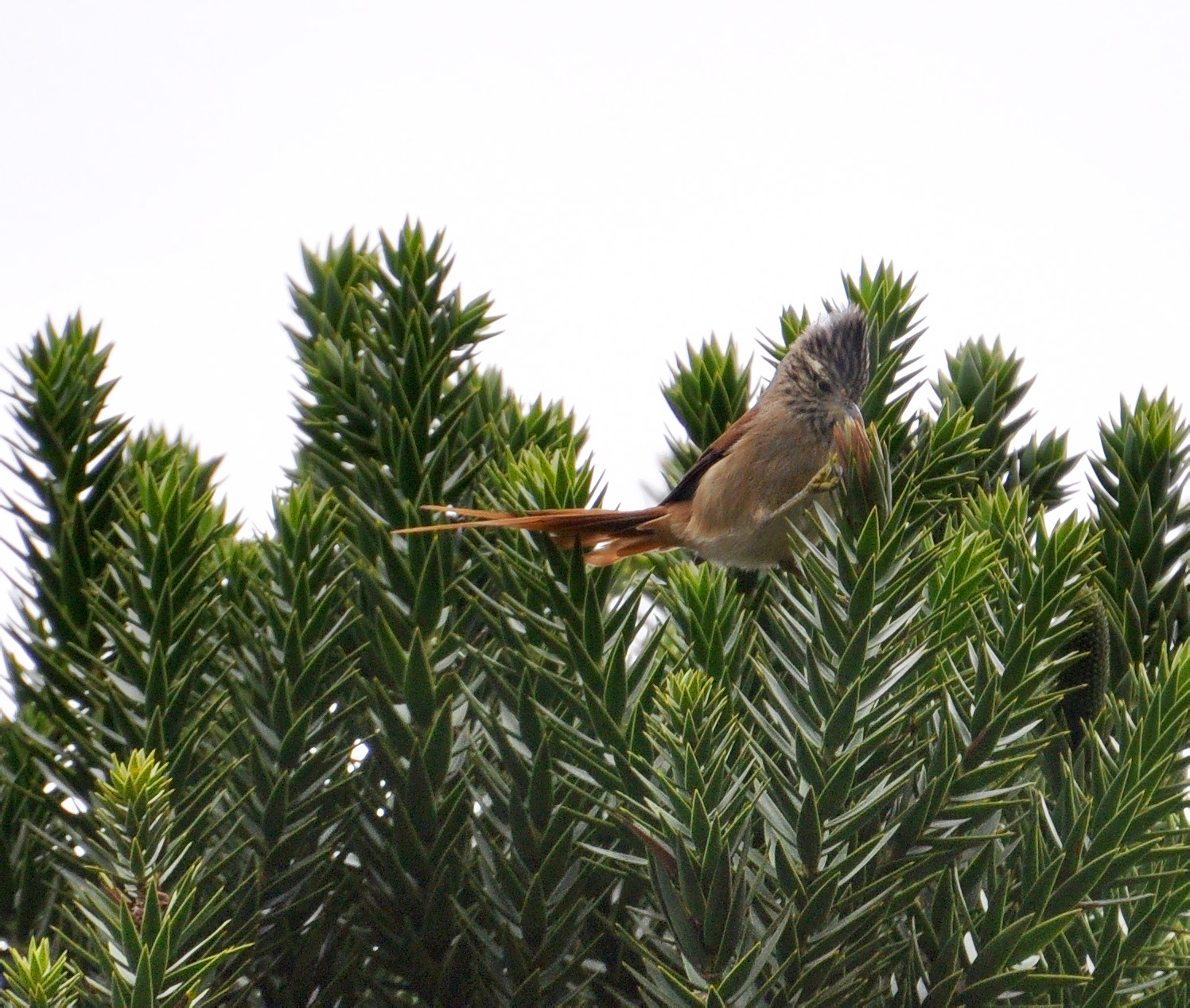

Conservation status
- Least Concern (IUCN 3.1)

Scientific classification
- Kingdom: Animalia
- Phylum: Chordata
- Class: Aves
- Order: Passeriformes
- Family: Furnariidae
- Genus: Leptasthenura
- Species: L. setaria

Binomial name
- Leptasthenura setaria (Temminck, 1824)

= Araucaria tit-spinetail =

Species of bird

The Araucaria tit-spinetail (Leptasthenura setaria) is a Near Threatened species of bird in the Furnariinae subfamily of the ovenbird family Furnariidae. It is found in Argentina and Brazil.

== Taxonomy and systematics ==
For a period in the early twentieth century the Araucaria tit-spinetail was placed by itself in genus Dendrophylax. Research published in 2011 conclusively placed it in Leptasthenura.

The Araucaria tit-spinetail's English name comes from the Araucaria angustifolia ("Brazilian pine"), on which is the bird is totally dependent.

The Araucaria tit-spinetail is monotypic.

== Description ==
The Araucaria tit-spinetail is 17 to 19 cm (6.7 to 7.5 in) long and weighs about 11 g (0.39 oz). It is a small-bodied, long-tailed furnariid with a short crest and a longish (for the genus) slightly decurved bill. The sexes have the same plumage. Adults have a thin white supercilium on an otherwise black and white striped face. Their crown and crest are blackish with narrow paler streaks. Their upperparts are reddish brown with faint pale streaks on the upper back. Their wings are mostly rufous with wide rufous bases on the otherwise blackish flight feathers. Their tail is mostly reddish brown with the inner webs of the three central pairs a darker brown; the tail is deeply forked and the feathers have bare shafts at their ends. Their throat and upper breast are whitish with blackish streaks; their lower breast and belly are tawny-buff that is richer on the flanks. Their iris is brown or gray, their bill blackish with a paler base to the mandible, and their legs and feet grayish green. Juveniles have an almost unstreaked crown and a less distinct pattern overall.

== Distribution and habitat ==
The Araucaria tit-spinetail is found in Brazil from far southern Minas Gerais and Rio de Janeiro states south into Rio Grande do Sol and west into northern Argentina's Misiones Province. It inhabits Araucaria angustifolia trees in almost any landscape, be it forest, woodland, scattered groves, gardens, or plantations. In elevation it mostly occurs between 750 and 1,400 m (2,500 and 4,600 ft) but is found as high as 2,000 m (6,600 ft).

== Behavior ==
=== Movement ===
The Araucaria tit-spinetail is a year-round resident throughout its range.

=== Feeding ===
The Araucaria tit-spinetail feeds on arthropods. It forages singly or in pairs, almost entirely in Araucaria angustifolia trees, gleaning prey from the needles and branches from the tree's mid-level to its canopy. It sometimes hangs upside down while foraging.

=== Breeding ===
The Araucaria tit-spinetail is thought to breed in the austral spring and summer and is thought to be monogamous. It builds a ball-shaped nest of vegetation and moss high in a tree. Nothing else is known about its breeding biology.

=== Vocalization ===
The Araucaria tit-spinetail's song is a "series (2-3 sec) of very high, thin notes changing in tempo between trill and rattle".

== Status ==
The IUCN has assessed he Araucaria tit-spinetail as Near Threatened. It has a small range, highly specialized habitat requirements, and an unknown population size that is believed to be decreasing. Much of the original Araucaria angustifolia forest has been cleared for agriculture and pasture. (The tree itself is assessed as Critically Endangered.) Some effort has been made to reforest some areas with the tree but the results have been mixed. It is considered fairly common to common in its small range, and occurs in a few protected areas. It appears "able to adapt to human disturbance as long as Araucaria trees [are] not removed".
