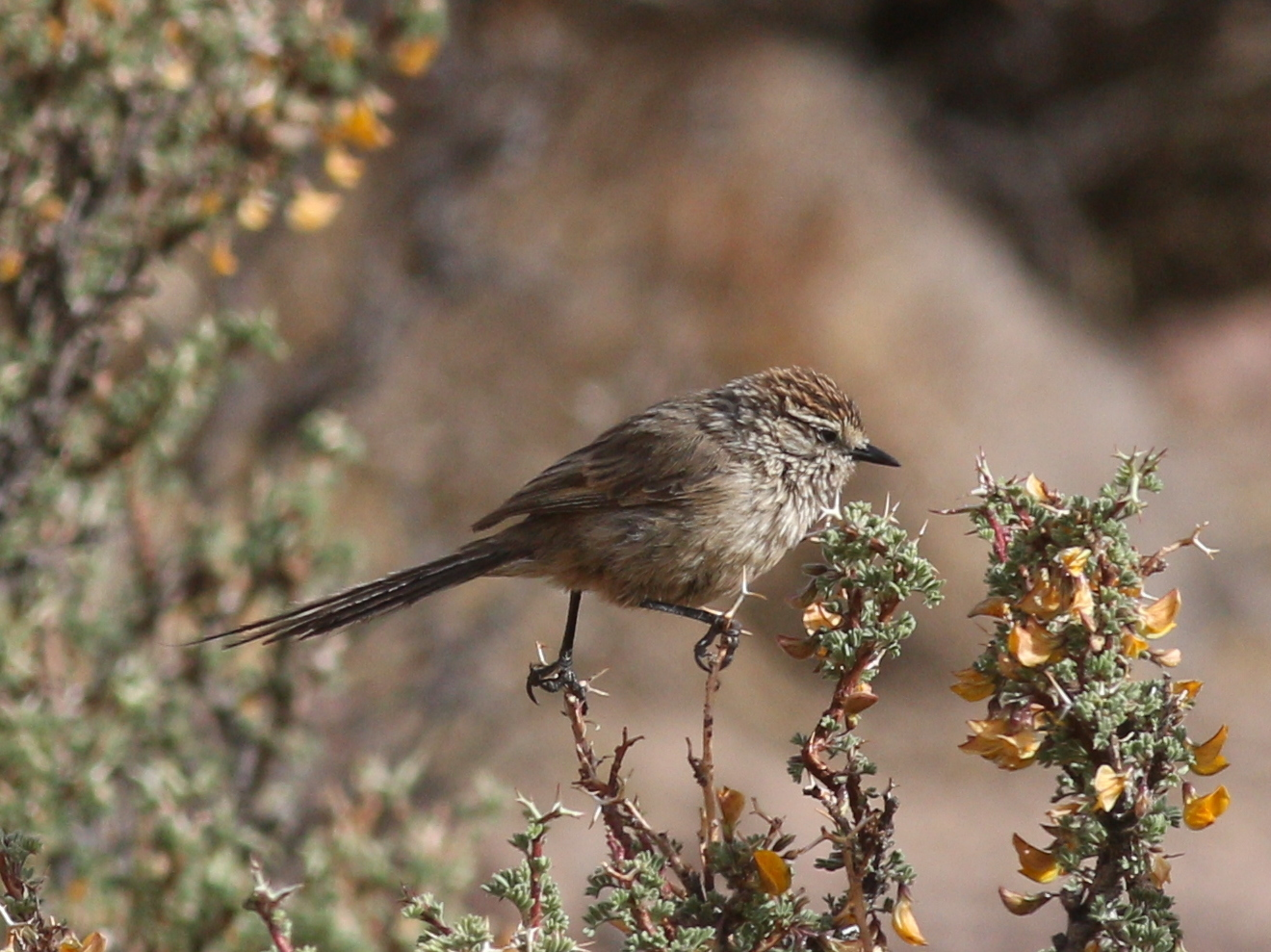

Conservation status
- Least Concern (IUCN 3.1)(but see the Taxonomy and Status sections)

Scientific classification
- Kingdom: Animalia
- Phylum: Chordata
- Class: Aves
- Order: Passeriformes
- Family: Furnariidae
- Genus: Leptasthenura
- Species: L. aegithaloides

Binomial name
- Leptasthenura aegithaloides (Kittlitz, 1830)
- Range of L. a. aegithaloides and L. a. grisescens; see the Taxonomy and Distribution sections.

= Plain-mantled tit-spinetail =

Species of bird

The plain-mantled tit-spinetail (Leptasthenura aegithaloides) is a small passerine bird of South America in the Furnariinae subfamily of the ovenbird family Furnariidae. It is found in Argentina, Bolivia, Chile, and Peru.

== Taxonomy and systematics ==
The plain-mantled tit-spinetail's taxonomy is unsettled. The South American Classification Committee of the American Ornithological Society, the International Ornithological Committee, and the Clements taxonomy assign it these four subspecies:

- L. a. grisescens Hellmayr, 1925
- L. a. berlepschi Hartert, EJO, 1909
- L. a. aegithaloides (Kittlitz, 1830)
- L. a. pallida Dabbene, 1920

However, BirdLife International's Handbook of the Birds of the World (HBW) treats L. a. berlepschi as the separate species "buffy tit-spinetail" and L. a. pallida as another separate species, the "pallid tit-spinetail". It retains "plain-mantled tit-spinetail" for L. a. aegithaloides plus L. a. grisescens.

This article follows the one-species, four-subspecies model.

== Description ==
The plain-mantled tit-spinetail is 15 to 17 cm (5.9 to 6.7 in) long and weighs 7.5 to 11 g (0.26 to 0.39 oz). It is a small, slender, long-tailed furnariid with a short bill. The sexes have the same plumage. Adults of the nominate subspecies L. a. aegithaloides have a white supercilium on an otherwise dark brownish, whitish streaked, face. Their crown is dark brown with wide golden-tawny streaks, their hindneck dark brown with grayish-white streaks, and their back, rump, and uppertail coverts dull brownish. Their upperwing coverts are dull brownish with rufous edges and their flight feathers dull fuscous with dark rufous bases. Also, their tail feathers are dark fuscous brown with paler edges; the tail is graduated and appears forked due to the central feathers having reduced inner webs. Their throat is whitish with some dark feather edges that increase onto the upper breast. The rest of their breast is dull grayish brown and the rest of their underparts are slightly paler. Their iris is brown, their maxilla blackish to dark gray-brown, their mandible dark horn to greenish gray, and their legs and feet gray to blackish. Juveniles have indistinct crown and throat markings, a lightly spotted back, and rounded tail feathers.

Subspecies L. a. grisescens is overall paler than the nominate, with wider and paler stripes on the crown, a grayer back and buffier rump, paler edges on the wing coverts, and grayer underparts. L. a. berlepschi is larger and bulkier than the nominate. It has a paler cinnamon crown whose streaks greatly contrast, pale buff streaks on the neck, cinnamon rather than rufous on the wing coverts and flight feathers, pale buff outer tail feathers, and entirely buffy underparts. L. a. pallida has the longest tail of all subspecies. Its crown and neck are similar to those of berlepschi. Its upperparts are mostly pale gray with a pale buffy rump. It is pale cinnamon on the wing coverts and flight feathers, and its belly is pale gray with sometimes a buff wash on the belly and flanks.

== Distribution and habitat ==
The nominate subspecies of the plain-mantled tit-spinetail is found in central Chile between the Coquimbo and Aysén regions. Subspecies L. a. grisescens is the northernmost; it is found coastally from Peru's Department of Arequipa south into northern Chile as far as the Atacama Region. L. a. berlepschi is found in the Andes of southern Peru, northern Chile, western Bolivia, and northwestern Argentina. L. a. pallida is found from northern Argentina and southern Chile south onto Tierra del Fuego.

The subspecies of the plain-mantled tit-spinetail inhabit different landscapes. The nominate subspecies and L. a. grisescens occur in arid scrublands (both lowland and montane), open forests, and in the natural vegetation in human-modified areas like agricultural fields, parks, and oases. In elevation, it ranges from near sea level to 2,500 m (8,200 ft) in Chile and up to 2,000 m (6,600 ft) in Peru. Subspecies L. a. berlepschi inhabits puna grasslands and scrublands of the Altiplano. In elevation, it ranges from about 3,500 to 4,300 m (11,500 to 14,100 ft) in Peru and 2,000 to 4,200 m (6,600 to 13,800 ft) in Chile and Argentina. L. a. pallida inhabits scrublands and woodlands at the transition between the lower elevation forest and higher steppe; it also occurs on salt flats and in arid thorny woods. In elevation, it ranges from sea level to 700 m (2,300 ft).

== Behavior ==
=== Movement ===
The nominate subspecies of the plain-mantled tit-spinetail is partially migratory. The southernmost sub-population moves somewhat north and many of the more northerly ones move downslope after the breeding season. Subspecies L. a. grisescens moves among widely separate oases in desert areas. Subspecies L. a. berlepschi is thought to be a year-round resident throughout its range. The southern sub-population of L. a. pallida moves north as far as central and northern Argentina, but the details of its migration are not well understood.

=== Feeding ===
The plain-mantled tit-spinetail feeds on arthropods. It typically forages in pairs or in small groups that may be families; in the non-breeding season, it forages in flocks of up to about 40 individuals. It regularly joins mixed species feeding flocks. It feeds from the forest's understorey to its canopy, though in some areas it stays quite low and even on the ground. It usually forages by gleaning its prey from foliage, flower clusters, twigs, and branches. It sometimes hangs upside down to reach prey.

=== Breeding ===
The plain-mantled tit-spinetail breeds in the austral spring and summer. It is thought to be monogamous. It builds a cup nest of twigs, grasses, hair, and feathers in a cavity. It uses natural holes and holes made by woodpeckers in small trees and cacti, the abandoned nests of other birds, and crevices in rocks, cliffs, earthen banks, and even buildings. The nominate subspecies has also been documented nesting within the nest of larger species like the variable hawk (Geranoaetus polyosoma) and monk parakeet (Myiopsitta monachus). Their clutch size is two to four eggs. The incubation period, time to fledging, and details of parental care are not known.

=== Vocalization ===
The subspecies of the plain-mantled tit-spinetail have quite different voices. The nominate subspecies' song is "a high-pitched descending, broken trill lasting 2–5 seconds, with accentuated sharper notes, e.g. 'chikiti-chikiti-chikiti- chikiti-ti-ti-ti-pweew-ti-ti-ti-pweew-ti-ti-ti…' ". Its calls include a "shorter, lower-pitched nasal trill, 'prrr' " and "a double 'tzk-tzk' or 'pit-tzk-tzk' ". The song of L. a. grisescens is similar to the nominate's but "quicker and even higher-pitched". Its calls are "a short chatter, 'tchi-chi-chi-chi-chi' or 'tchee-tchee-tchee', and a dry 'tchit' ". L. a. berlepschi's song is "a buzzy chatter or descending tinkling trill...rendered 'zzzp- zzz- zzzp-zzzp-zzzp-zzzp-zzzp-…' or 'chip'pip'pip'pip'pip'pip'pip'zzzp-zzzp…' ". Its call is "a short, descending trill comprising 4–8 notes, e.g. 'TREeeeet' ". L. a. pallida's song is "a rollicking chatter, which is higher-pitched, quicker and more musical than [the nominate's]", and its call is "a high-pitched, buzzy, chattering 'pzzzizizizizzt' ".

== Status ==
The IUCN follows HBW taxonomy and so has separately assessed the "plain-mantled" sensu stricto, the "buffy", and the "pallid" tit-spinetails. All are treated as being of Least Concern, all have large ranges, and all have populations of unknown size that are believed to be stable. No immediate threats to any of them have been identified. All four subspecies are considered fairly common in much of their ranges, and all occur in at least one protected area. They seem "able to tolerate modest habitat degradation".
