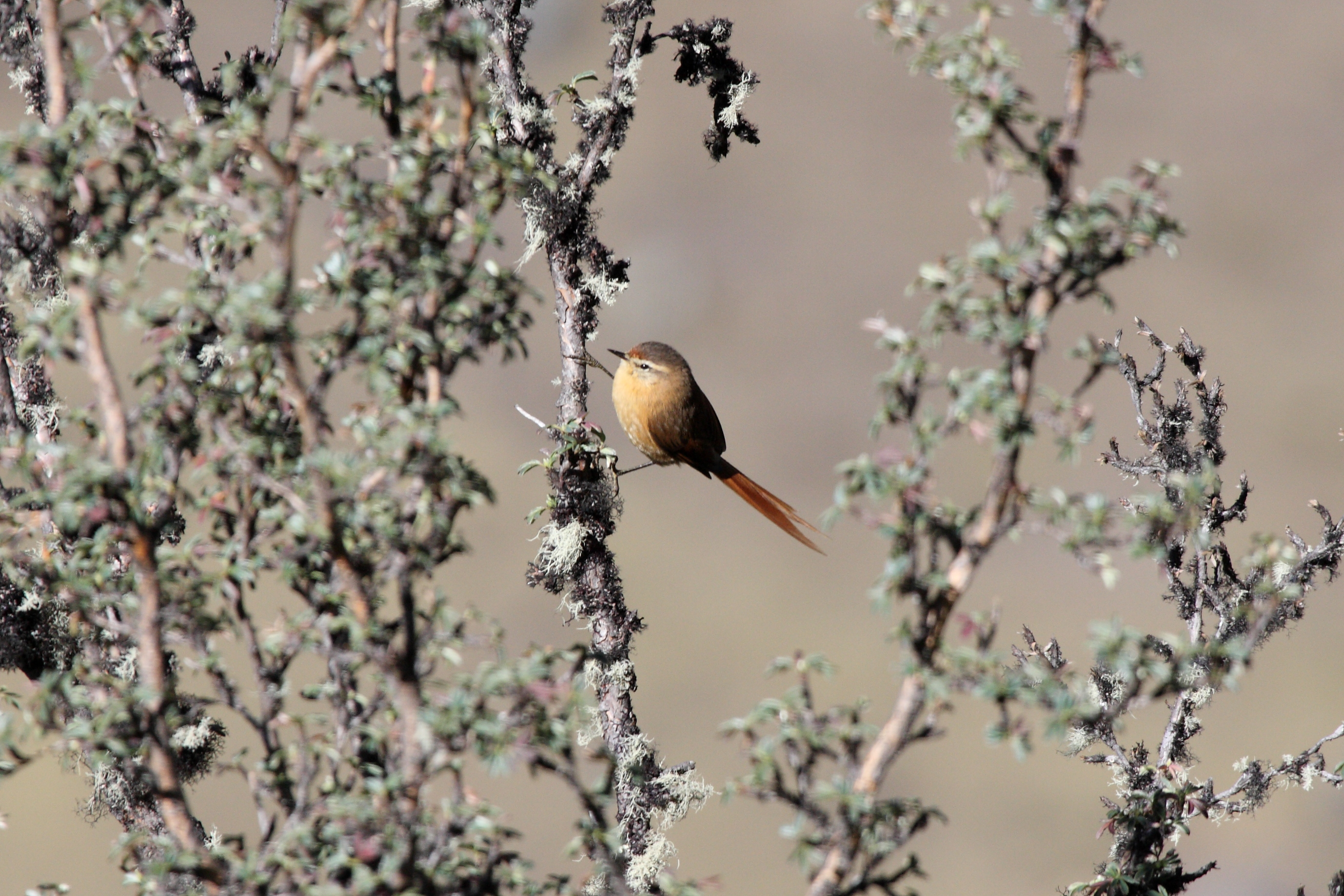
- Tawny tit-spinetail, Sylviorthorhynchus yanacensis

Scientific classification
- Kingdom: Animalia
- Phylum: Chordata
- Class: Aves
- Order: Passeriformes
- Family: Furnariidae
- Genus: Sylviorthorhynchus; Gay, 1845

Type species
- Sylviorthorhynchus desmurii Gay, 1845

Species
- 2, see text

= Sylviorthorhynchus =

Genus of birds

Sylviorthorhynchus is a genus of small passerine birds belonging to the ovenbird family Furnariidae. They are somewhat similar to birds of the tit family in their shape and feeding behaviour. They have short rounded wings, short pointed bills and are mainly brown in colour. Their nests are built in holes or in the old nests of other birds.

== Species list ==
- Des Murs's wiretail, Sylviorthorhynchus desmurii
- Tawny tit-spinetail, Sylviorthorhynchus yanacensis
