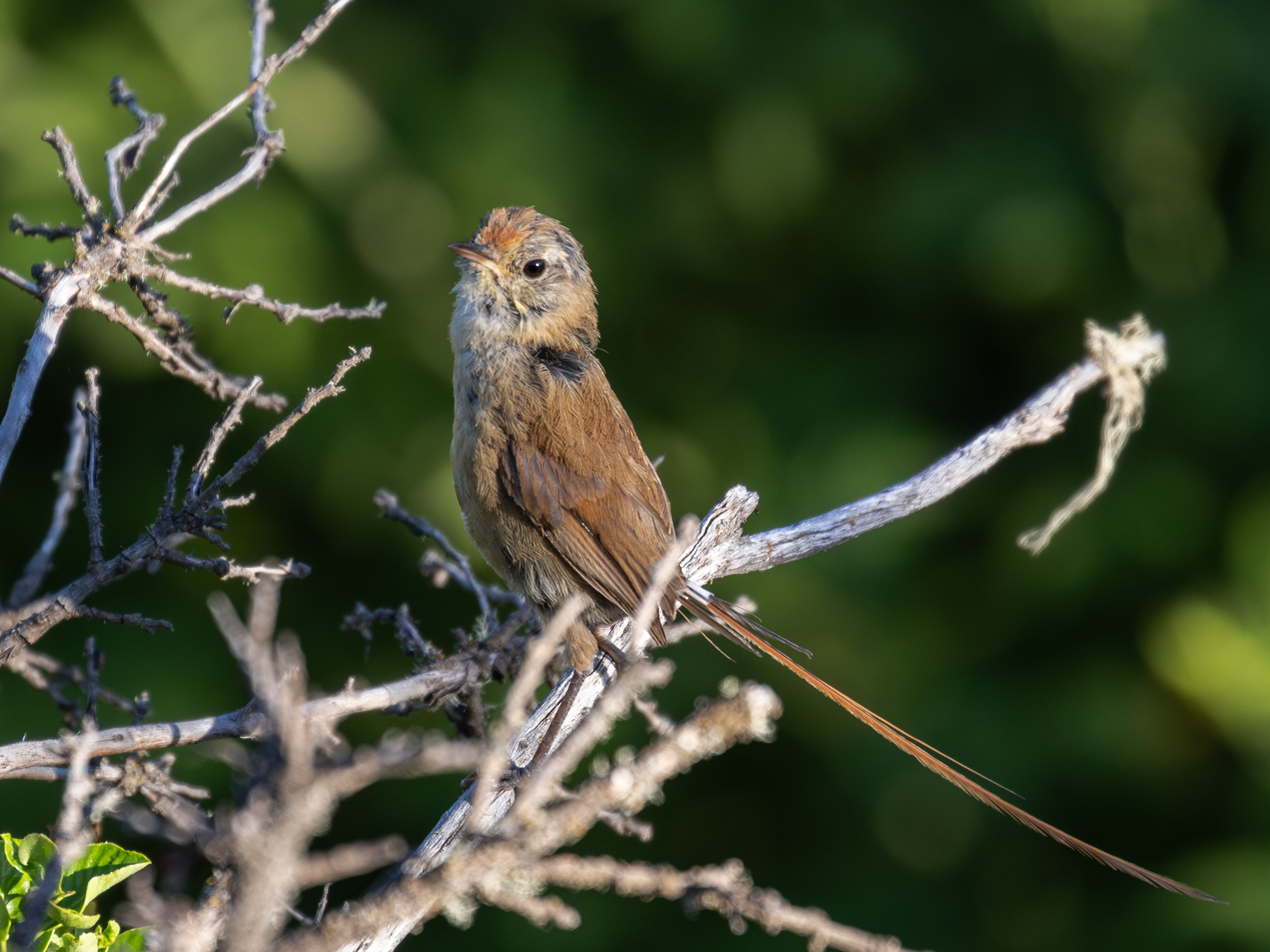
- Des Murs's wiretail, San Martín de los Andes, Neuquén, Argentina

Conservation status
- Least Concern (IUCN 3.1)

Scientific classification
- Kingdom: Animalia
- Phylum: Chordata
- Class: Aves
- Order: Passeriformes
- Family: Furnariidae
- Genus: Sylviorthorhynchus
- Species: S. desmurii

Binomial name
- Sylviorthorhynchus desmurii Gay, 1845

= Des Murs's wiretail =

Species of bird

Des Murs's wiretail (Sylviorthorhynchus desmurii) is a small passerine bird of southern South America which belongs to the ovenbird family Furnariidae. Molecular phylogenetics places it within the Synallaxinae and indicates that the genus diverged from the Leptasthenura about 14–15 million years ago.

== Taxonomy ==
Des Murs's wiretail was illustrated and given the binomial name Sylviorthorhynchus desmurii by the French naturalist Claude Gay in 1845. The specific epithet was chosen to honour the French ornithologist Marc Athanase Parfait Œillet des Murs. The species is monotypic: no subspecies are recognised.

== Description ==
It is 24 centimetres (9.4 in) long, with the very long tail accounting for about two-thirds of this, but weighs as little as 10 grams (0.35 oz). The tail consists of just six feathers which are very narrow and filament-like: so few rectrices are elsewhere seen only in the emu-wrens of Australia. The two central feathers are greatly elongated while the two outer feathers are very short. The plain plumage is reddish-brown above, paler on the underparts. There is a pale stripe above the eye. The bird is small and rounded with a very fine bill. The song is fast and high-pitched.

== Distribution and habitat ==
It is found in western Argentina from Santa Cruz Province north to San Juan and in southern and central Chile from northern Magallanes to Valparaíso Region. It inhabits dense thickets of Chusquea bamboo within cool temperate rainforests, occurring from sea-level up to 1,200 metres, but also can occur in early-successional shrublands of highly shade-tolerant Myrtaceae species, chiefly Amomyrtus. Des Murs's wiretail is also known to occur in dense weedy thickets of plants like gorse over the northern extremity of its range. Even in undisturbed rainforests, however, wiretails use only the low-level shrub and bamboo layer for foraging, never flying higher than 3 metres (10 ft) above the ground.

== Behaviour and ecology ==
It is very shy and difficult to see, being completely unable to enter areas without dense vegetative overstoreys, and cannot typically use corridors smaller than 25 m (80 ft) or fly further than 50 m (160 ft) between patches of suitable habitat.

When encountered Des Murs's wiretail can easily be mistaken for a mouse. It has the unique ability among birds to curl up its long tail into a ball when alarmed.

The ball-shaped nest is made of plant fibres and built amongst vegetation close to the ground. Both partners are highly territorial with a territory size of around 1 ha (2.5 acres) per pair; however, pairs in territories smaller than 20 ha (49 acres) are seldom successful at nesting. This territory and the nest site are defended vigorously against conspecifics with a distinctive territorial song, and it is possible that the long tail is used by both sexes as an means of choosing a mate, though no actual tests have been used to determine how wiretails find a mate.

As is typical for south temperate insectivorous birds, during the breeding season of October to February Des Murs's wiretail lays a clutch of two to four eggs, but for the bird's mass these are about the largest eggs of any passerine bird. At 20.5 mm (0.8 in) long and 15.8 mm (0.6 in) wide, they weigh twice as much as expected for a 10 gram passerine and a clutch of four weighs more than the adult female – a feat equalled only by much more fecund kinglets. Little is known about incubation, fledging periods, or postfledging parental care due to the very secretive nature of the species.
