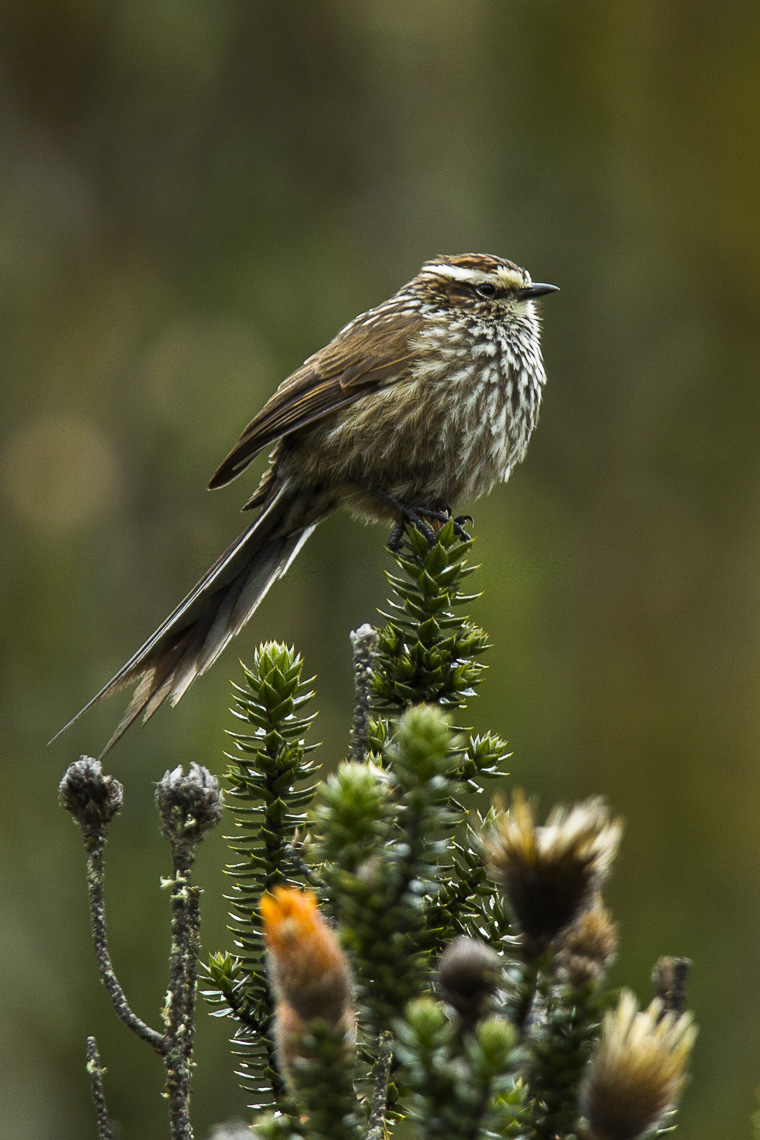

Conservation status
- Least Concern (IUCN 3.1)

Scientific classification
- Kingdom: Animalia
- Phylum: Chordata
- Class: Aves
- Order: Passeriformes
- Family: Furnariidae
- Genus: Leptasthenura
- Species: L. andicola

Binomial name
- Leptasthenura andicola Sclater, PL, 1870

Audio
- Song of Andean tit-spinetail

= Andean tit-spinetail =

Species of bird

The Andean tit-spinetail (Leptasthenura andicola) is a species of bird in the Furnariinae subfamily of the ovenbird family Furnariidae. It is found in Bolivia, Colombia, Ecuador, Peru, and Venezuela.

== Taxonomy and systematics ==
The Andean tit-spinetail has these five subspecies:

- Leptasthenura andicola certhia (Madarász, G, 1903)
- Leptasthenura andicola extima Todd, 1916
- Leptasthenura andicola exterior Todd, 1919
- Leptasthenura andicola andicola Sclater, PL, 1870
- Leptasthenura andicola peruviana Chapman, 1919

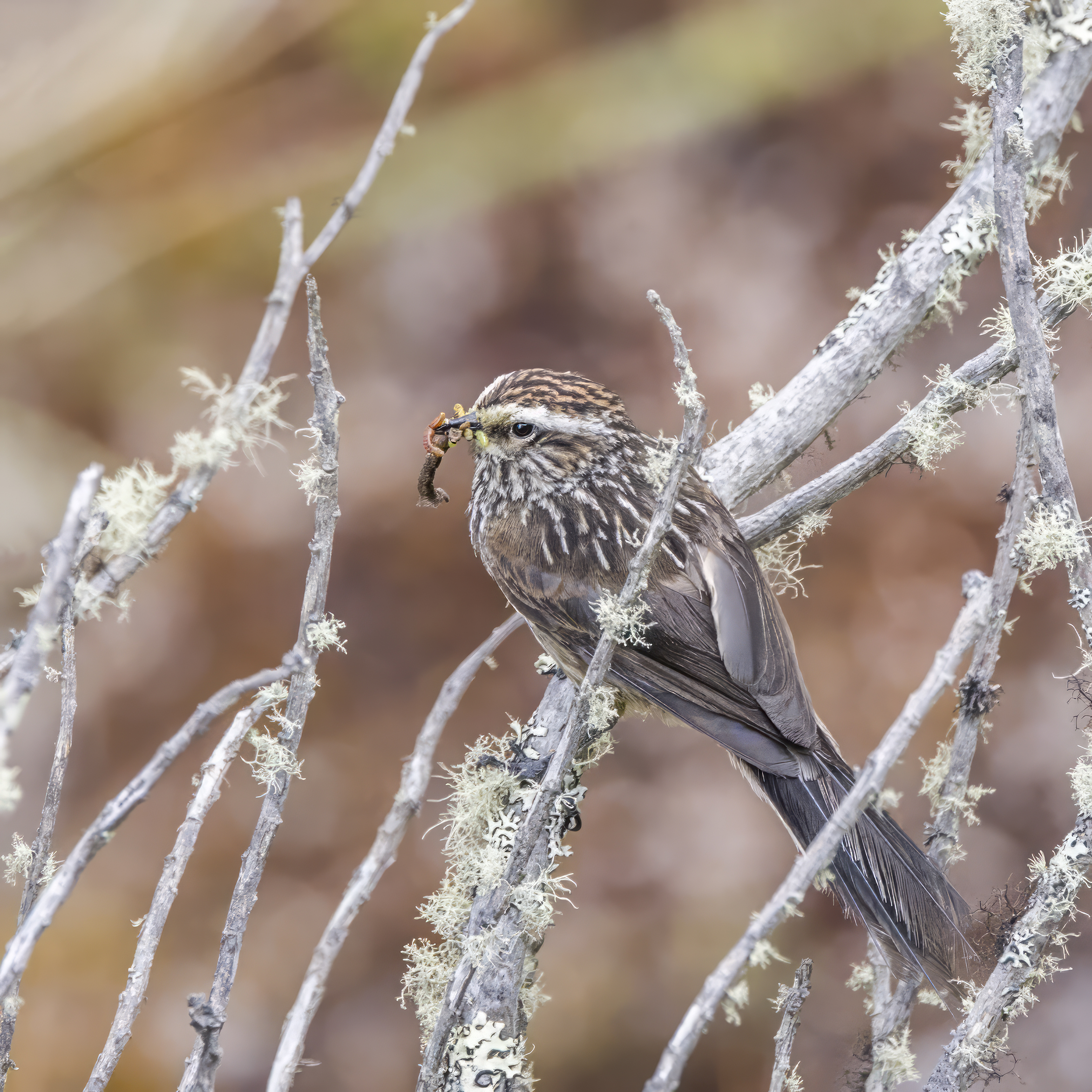
Feeding in Colombia

== Description ==
The Andean tit-spinetail is 15 to 17 cm (5.9 to 6.7 in) long and weighs about 15 to 16 g (0.53 to 0.56 oz). It is a small-bodied, long-tailed furnariid with a short bill. The sexes have the same plumage. Adults of the nominate subspecies L. a. andicola have a wide white supercilium on an otherwise dark streaky gray-brown face. Their crown is rich rufous chestnut with black streaks. Their upperparts are dark gray-brown with prominent white or whitish streaks. Their wings are dark brownish with faint rufescent edges on the coverts and flight feathers. Their tail's central pair of feathers are dusky brown to blackish ard are long and pointed, giving a forked appearance. The rest of the tail feathers are dusky brown to blackish with buffy outer webs. Their throat is white or whitish and their breast and belly are gray-brown with heavy white or whitish streaks that are more diffuse on the flanks and lower belly. Their iris is dark brown to reddish brown, their bill black with a slightly paler base to the mandible, and their legs and feet dark gray to black. Juveniles have little or no streaking on their crown, and their belly is mottled or scaly rather than streaked.

Subspecies L. a. extima is smaller than the nominate, with a narrower and buffier supercilium, paler crown streaks, bright cinnamon brown edges on the wing coverts, much cinnamon rufous on the flight feathers, and a buffier brown belly. L. a. certhia has a whiter supercilium than extima, with lighter crown streaks, smaller cinnamon edges on the wing coverts and flight feathers, a whiter throat and breast, and grayer underparts. L. a. exterior compared to extima has a brighter black-streaked rufous crown, wider white streaks on the back, a whiter throat, and a less brownish belly. L. a. peruviana compared to the nominate has a less streaky face, a paler crown with narrower black streaks, paler edges on the wing coverts, wider buff edges on the flight feathers, and a darker breast and belly.

== Distribution and habitat ==
The Andean tit-spinetail has a disjunct distribution from Venezuela to Bolivia. Its subspecies are found thus:

- Leptasthenura andicola certhia: Andes in western Venezuela's Mérida and Trujillo states
- Leptasthenura andicola extima: the isolated Sierra Nevada de Santa Marta in northern Colombia
- Leptasthenura andicola exterior: Colombia's Eastern Andes in Boyacá and Cundinamarca departments
- Leptasthenura andicola andicola: from Tolima Department in Colombia's Central Andes south in the Andes of Ecuador to Zamora-Chinchipe Province
- Leptasthenura andicola peruviana: Andes of western and southern Peru from Ancash to Arequipa and Puno departments, and into Bolivia as far as La Paz Department

The Andean tit-spinetail generally inhabits semi-arid to arid montane scrublands. In the north it also occurs in humid grasslands and páramo, and throughout its range it occurs in Polylepis woodlands. In elevation it is found between 3,400 and 4,400 m (11,200 and 14,400 ft) in Venezuela, 3,000 and 4,200 m (9,800 and 13,800 ft) in Colombia, 3,200 and 4,000 m (10,500 and 13,100 ft) in Ecuador, 3,500 and 4,200 m (11,500 and 13,800 ft) in Peru, and 3,500 and 4,450 m (11,500 and 14,600 ft) in Bolivia.

== Behavior ==
=== Migration ===
The Andean tit-spinetail is a year-round resident throughout its range.

=== Feeding ===
The Andean tit-spinetail feeds on arthropods but its diet is not known in detail. It typically forages in pairs or small groups, but only occasionally joins mixed-species feeding flocks. It is an active forager, gleaning from foliage, flowers, and twigs as it hops along branches. It often hangs upside down to capture prey.

=== Breeding ===
The Andean tit-spinetail's breeding season or seasons have not been fully defined. It varies geographically but overall appears to fall between May and December. It makes a cup nest of grass and moss lined with animal fur, seed fluff, and feathers. It places it on the ground, in a cavity overhung by vegetation, under the eave of a structure, and sometimes at the end of a burrow that a mammal or some other bird excavated. The clutch size is usually two eggs. The incubation period is at least 16 days, the time to fledging is not known, and both parents provision nestlings.

=== Vocalization ===
What is thought to be the Andean tit-spinetail's song has been described as "a descending series of notes starting and ending with a trill or a tinkling trill that descends a little" and as "a hesitating series of high-pitched short trills". Its calls include "a weak, tinkling téz-dit or téz-dit-dit" and "fine zik, ti, or tic notes". It also makes "a high, mammallike squeal".

== Conservation status ==
The IUCN has assessed the Andean tit-spinetail as being of Least Concern. It has a very large range, and though its population size is not known it is believed to be stable. No immediate threats have been identified. It is considered fairly common and "probably is little affected by human activity, other than the local effects of habitat loss".
