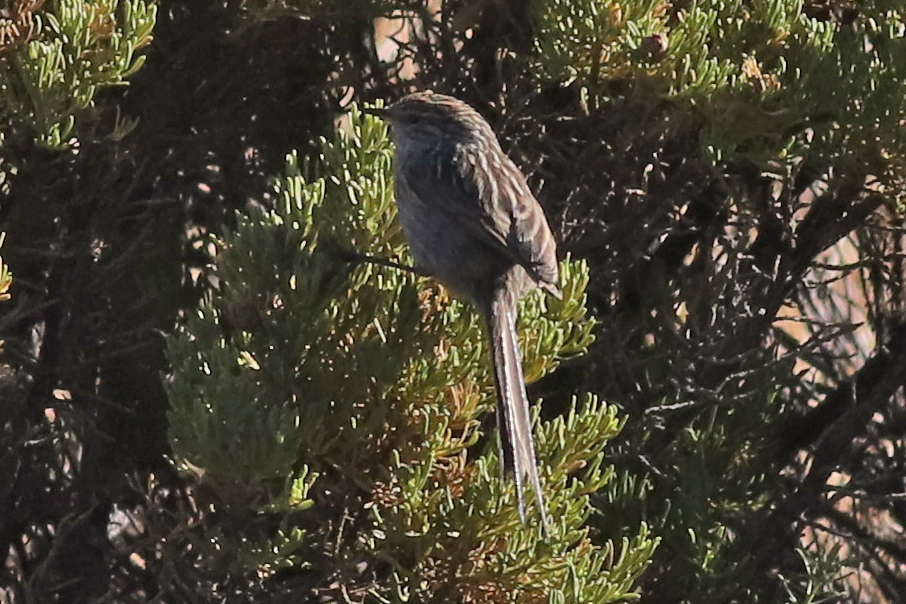

Conservation status
- Least Concern (IUCN 3.1)

Scientific classification
- Kingdom: Animalia
- Phylum: Chordata
- Class: Aves
- Order: Passeriformes
- Family: Furnariidae
- Genus: Leptasthenura
- Species: L. striata

Binomial name
- Leptasthenura striata (Philippi & Landbeck, 1863)

= Streak-backed tit-spinetail =

Species of bird

The streak-backed tit-spinetail, or streaked tit-spinetail, (Leptasthenura striata) is a species of bird in the Furnariinae subfamily of the ovenbird family Furnariidae. It is found in Chile and Peru.

== Taxonomy and systematics ==
The streak-backed tit-spinetail has three subspecies, the nominate L. s. striata (Philippi & Landbeck, 1863), L. s. superciliaris (Hellmayr, 1932), and L. s. albigularis (Morrison, ARG, 1938).

== Description ==
The streak-backed tit-spinetail is 14.5 to 16.5 cm (5.7 to 6.5 in) long and weighs about 8.5 to 10.5 g (0.30 to 0.37 oz). It is a small-bodied, long-tailed furnariid with a short bill. The sexes have the same plumage. Adults of the nominate subspecies have an indistinct dirty white supercilium on an otherwise blackish and whitish streaked face. Their crown is black and heavily striped with rufous. Their back is streaked with dusky brown and tawny buff that diminish to the mostly plain olive brown rump. Their wing coverts are blackish with wide cinnamon rufous edges. Their flight feathers are dusky brown with cinnamon rufous bases that show as a patch on the closed wing. Their tail's central pair of feathers are dusky brown with much pale gray-brown, the next two pairs mostly dusky brown, and the rest dusky brown with progressively more pale gray-brown at their ends to the outermost, which are almost entirely pale. The feathers have bare shafts on their tips giving a spiny appearance. Their throat is white with some dusky spots and their breast and belly are grayish white with obscure whitish streaks. Their iris is brown, their bill black with a yellow base to the mandible, and their legs and feet black. Juveniles have a nearly plain gray-brown crown, dark scallop marks on the breast, and more rufous on the wings than adults. Subspecies L. s. superciliaris has a cinnamon-rufous crown, nearly white streaks on the back and wing coverts, and paler and less gray underparts than the nominate. L. s. albigularis is similar to superciliaris but with an unspotted pure white throat.

== Distribution and habitat ==
The streak-backed tit-spinetail is found along the west slope of the Andes of Peru and Chile. Subspecies L. s. superciliaris is the northernmost; it occurs in the western Peruvian departments of Ancash and Lima. L. s. albigularis occurs in the Department of Huancavelica in southwestern Peru. The nominate subspecies occurs from the Department of Arequipa in far southwestern Peru south into Chile as far as the Tarapacá Region. The species primarily inhabits arid montane scrublands, some of which have cacti and bromeliads; it also occurs in Polylepis woodlands. In elevation it mostly ranges between 2,000 and 4,200 m (6,600 and 13,800 ft) in Peru (but locally down to 900 m (3,000 ft)), and between 3,000 and 4,000 m (9,800 and 13,100 ft) in Chile.

== Behavior ==
=== Movement ===
The streak-backed tit-spinetail is a year-round resident throughout its range.

=== Feeding ===
The streak-backed tit-spinetail feeds on arthropods but its diet is not known in detail. It forages in pairs or small family groups and often joins mixed-species foraging flocks. It gleans prey from foliage, flowers, and twigs in shrubs and trees, and occasionally forages on the ground.

=== Breeding ===
The streak-backed tit-spinetail's breeding season has not been defined but includes April and May. Nothing else is known about its breeding biology.

=== Vocalization ===
The streak-backed tit-spinetail's song is "a melancholy, but musical, descending series of high, ringing whistles: tchee-LEEa'LEEa'LEEa'LEEa'LEEa'LEEa'LEE". Its calls include "a slightly wheezy twet and a trit", "a harsh cht or tzip", "a sharper chattered series of less musical tcht and tsit notes", and "a lower, gruff tchut".

== Status ==
The IUCN has assessed the streak-backed tit-spinetail as being of Least Concern. It has a large range but its population size is not known and is believed to be decreasing. No immediate threats have been identified. It is considered fairly common and "probably is little affected by human activity, other than the local effects of habitat loss".
